= Masako Ebisu =

Japanese actress (born 1945)

- 恵比寿 まさ子
- Born: Masako Hoshino (星野 真沙子); August 3, 1945 (age 81); Tokyo, Japan
- Occupations: Actress; voice actress; narrator
- Years active: 1960–present
- Agent: Herringbone
- Notable credits: Doraemon as Shizuka Minamoto; Attack No. 1 as Ryōko Kakinouchi; Ashita no Joe as Yōko Shiraki; Sazae-san as Taiko Namino; The Kabocha Wine as Natsumi's mother; Tonari no Tamageta-kun as Herumeko

Masako Hoshino (星野 真沙子, Hoshino Masako; born August 3, 1945) known professionally as Masako Ebisu (恵比寿 まさ子, Ebisu Masako) is a Japanese actress and voice actress. She is also a freelancer affiliated with the talent agency Herringbone as a narrator.

She is best known for her roles as Shizuka Minamoto in Doraemon, Ryōko Kakinouchi in Attack No. 1, Yōko Shiraki in Ashita no Joe, Taiko Namino in Sazae-san, Natsumi's mother in The Kabocha Wine, and Herumeko in Tonari no Tamageta-kun.

== Biography ==
Born on August 3, 1945 in Tokyo, Japan, Ebisu was a former member of the Kokeshi-za Children's Theater Company and graduated from the Nihon University College of Art.

She had been previously affiliated with All Japan Music and Entertainment Production, N.N.A.C, the Tokyo Actor's Consumer's Cooperative Society, Enkyo-Pro, Mausu Promotion, Aoni Production, and Office Osawa Co.,Ltd.

Ebisu has appeared in hit shows such as Sazae-san and Ashita no Joe. In recent years, she's served as a narrator for Suntory's Jibun Bōe-dan commercials.

Following the deaths of Shun Yashiro in 2003, Kaneta Kimotsuki in 2016, Kōsei Tomita in 2020, and Yoshiko Ōta in 2021, she and Masako Nozawa (the voice of Doraemon from episodes 14 to 26) are currently the last surviving of the Nippon Doraemon series voice cast.

== Personal life ==
Her personal specialties include playing the shamisen and kouta.

== Filmography ==
=== Television animation ===
List of voice performances in television animation
Year	Title	Role(s)	Notes	Source
1967	Kaminari Bōya Pikkari-B	Additional voices		
1967	Sally the Witch	Yukari		
1968	The Monster Kid	Ako-chan		
1968	Star of the Giants	Additional voices		
1969	Attack No. 1	Yoshiko Kakinouchi		
1969	Kamui	Child		
1969	Judo Boy	Runya		
1970	Ashita no Joe	Yōko Shiraki	Second voice, Eps 34–44	
1971	Andersen Monogatari	Babette	Eps 38–40	
1971	Golgo 13	Additional voice		
1972	Akado Suzunosuke	Additional voices		
1972	Science Ninja Team Gatchaman	Girl		
1972	Pinocchio: The Series	Cannes, Girl		
1972	Kunimatsu-sama no Otoori dai	Hanae, Nana Sakakibara		
1972	The Gutsy Frog	Additional voices		
1973	Jungle Kurobe	Takane Fujino		
1973	Doraemon	Shizuka Minamoto	Main role	
1973	Karate Master	Yae Arima, Additional voices	Yae Arima in Ep. 5, Additional voices in Ep. 12	
1974	Aim for the Ace!	Additional voices		
1974	First Human Giatrus	Additional voices		
1974	Sazae-san	Taiko Namino	Second voice	
1974	Tonari no Tamageta-kun	Herumeko		
1974	New Honeybee Hutch	Dorothy		
1977	Yatterman	Guest		
1980	Galaxy Express 999	Ferasu, Keiko	Ferasu in Ep. 85, Keiko in Ep. 93	
1981	Galaxy Cyclone Braiger	Sue Lin-ho, Miguel	Sue Lin-ho in Ep. 12	
1981	Queen Millennia	Yuri Jūmonji	Episode 5	
1981	Tiger Mask II	Nancy		
1981	Hello! Sandybell	Additional voices		
1981	Dotakon	Sayuri Nijo, Akihiko Maehara's mother		
1982	Asari-chan	Flower Seller		
1982	Galactic Gale Baxingar	Stecken's mother		
1982	The Kabocha Wine	Natsumi's mother		
1982	Patalliro!	Garnecia	Ep. 9	
1982	I Am a Cat	Woman		
1983	I Am A Dog: Don Matsugorou's Life	Yōko	Television special	
1983	Manga Japanese History	Oichi		
1983	Mīmu Iro Iro Yume no Tabi	Mother		
1984	Sōya Monogatari	Haruko, Lady		
1986	Doteraman	Satoko Sato		
2000	Hiwou War Chronicles	Narrator		

=== Theatrical animation ===
List of voice performances in theatrical animation
Year	Title	Role	Notes	Source
1971	Attack No. 1: Immortal Bird	Miyuki Ōnuma		
1983	Genma Wars: Har-Magedon	Jō Azuma	young	

=== Commercials ===
List of voice performances in commercials
Title	Role	Notes	Source
Jibun Bōe-dan	Narrator	Suntory	
