= Keiko Yamamoto =

Japanese voice actress (1940–2024)

- 山本 圭子
- Born: August 7, 1940; Osaka Prefecture, Japan
- Died: April 18, 2024 (aged 83)
- Other name: Dodoko-san
- Occupations: Voice actress; narration
- Years active: 1960–2023
- Agent: Aoni Production
- Notable credit(s): Tensai Bakabon as Bakabon; Sazae-san as Hanako Hanazawa; GeGeGe no Kitaro as Sunakake Babaa; Chibi Maruko-chan as Shōta Yamada
- Website: Official profile

Keiko Yamamoto (山本 圭子, Yamamoto Keiko; August 7, 1940 – April 18, 2024) was a Japanese voice actress and narrator from Osaka Prefecture. Many of her voice acting roles were older women, young boys, or tomboyish young girls.

She is best known for her voice acting roles as the titular character in Tensai Bakabon, Hanako Hanazawa in Sazae-san, Sunakake Babaa in GeGeGe no Kitaro, Chikako in Himitsu no Akko-chan, the titular character in Ganbare!! Robocon, and Shōta Yamada in Chibi Maruko-chan.

== Biography ==
Yamamoto was born in Osaka Prefecture on August 7, 1940.

Ever since she was a child, she wanted to become a singer and graduated from the Department of Home Economics at the Soai Women's Junior College.

"Bitten by the acting bug" during her days as a student, Yamamoto moved to Tokyo after she graduated from college. She, relying on her older brother working as a manager at the Senuza theater troupe at the time, joined the theater troupe, where she learned the fundamentals of theater.

Originally Yamamoto wanted to be a live-action actress, but changed her mind and decided to become a voice actress instead, realizing, "as an actress, I would absolutely never get to play beautiful roles" and "with voice acting, your face doesn't matter, and I can even play handsome young boy roles."

She made her anime debut in 1963 as the voice of Wally in Wolf Boy Ken.

After working with the Tokyo Actor's Consumer's Cooperative Society, she participated in the founding of Aoni Production in 1969 and was affiliated with the company up until her death.

Starting in 1972, Yamamoto became the second voice actress of the character Hanako Hanazawa in Sazae-san.

In late 2020, it was announced that Yamamoto would take a hiatus from Sazae-san in order to receive treatment for a leg fracture, with Kazue Ikura serving as her substitute.

In October 2023, it was announced that Yamamoto stepped down from the role of Hanako Hanazawa on Sazae-san after over 50 years. Later that same year, she also stepped down from her role as Shōta Yamada on Chibi Maruko-chan.

=== Death ===
Yamamoto died from sepsis on April 18, 2024, at the age of 83. Per her family's wishes, her death was not officially announced until July 28 of that year.

== Successors ==
Following Yamamoto stepping down from her roles due to her advancing age and subsequent death, the following individuals have taken over some of her voice acting roles.

Successor	Character	Work	Debut
Eriko Kawasaki	Hanazawa's mother	Sazae-san	Broadcast on March 26, 2017
Eriko Kawasaki	Masuo's mother	Sazae-san	Broadcast on May 12, 2019
Eriko Kawasaki	Takeo's mother	Sazae-san	Broadcast on September 22, 2019
Rumi Ochiai	Anago's wife	Sazae-san	Broadcast on May 15, 2022
Kumiko Watanabe	Hanako Hanazawa	Sazae-san	Broadcast on November 5, 2023 (Note: Teiyū Ichiryūsai served as a substitute for the January 5, 2015 broadcast, while Kazue Ikura served as a substitute from the September 20 to October 11, 2020 broadcasts.)
Yuriko Yamamoto	Mrs. Ōishi	Chibi Maruko-chan	Broadcast on May 1, 2022
Emi Motoi	Shōta Yamada	Chibi Maruko-chan	Broadcast on Feb 4, 2024
Mami Matsui	Hamaji's mother	Chibi Maruko-chan	Broadcast on December 8, 2024
Kimiko Saitō	Whale Kutan	Let's Go! Anpanman	Broadcast on January 5, 2024

== Filmography ==
=== Television animation ===
List of voice performances in television animation
Year	Title	Role	Notes	Source
1963	Astro Boy	Marie		
1964	Wolf Boy Ken	Wally		
1964	Big X	Hans Engel		
1965	Tatakae! Osper	Osper	Lead role	
1966	Osomatsu-kun	Choromatsu, Karamatsu, Ichimatsu	Substitute voice for Ichimatsu, credited under "Emiko Suzuki" (鈴木恵美子) for first half	
1967	Sally the Witch	Nakano, Araki, Abe, Yamamoto, Busuo, Shinnyo		
1968	GeGeGe no Kitarō	Additional voices		
1968	Cyborg 009	Additional voices		
1969	Himitsu no Akko-chan	Chikako, Mori, Jiyunpei, Yōta, Take, Norikazu, Santarō, Kanta		
1969	Mōretsu Atarō	Atarō	Lead role	
1969	Tiger Mask	Goro, Tsuyoshi, Yoshimizu Saburo, Rota, Gaboten		
1969	Attack No. 1	Kaori Yagisawa		
1969	Pyunpyun Maru	Kemeko	Substitute voice	
1970	Inakappe Taishō	West II		
1971	Star of the Giants	Additional voices		
1971	Andersen Stories	Young Ib		
1971	Apatchi Yakyūgun	Daikon, Mari's mother		
1971	Kunimatsu-sama no Otoridai	Jirō Shiobara, Nobuotto, Akibo, Boo, Matsukichi, Additional voices		
1971	GeGeGe no Kitarō	Sunakake Babaa		
1971	Tensai Bakabon	Bakabon	Lead role	
1972	Sarutobi Ecchan	Additional voices		
1972	Lupin the 3rd Part I	Shukjo	Ep. 14	
1972	Mock of the Oak Tree	Franco		
1972	New Moomin	Holtdell		
1972	Sazae-san	Hanako Hanazawa, Hanazawa's mother, Mrs. Anago, Masuo's mother, Takeo's mother, Cassie, Additional voices	Second voice of Hanako Hanazawa and Mrs. Anago; First voice of Hanazawa's mother, Masuo's mother, and Takeo's mother	
1972	Triton of the Sea	Gem		
1972	Akadō Suzunosuke	Akadō Suzunosuke	Lead role	
1972	Devilman	Makimura Kensaku/Tare-chan		
1972	Mazinger Z	Additional voices		
1973	Babel II	Chii-bou	Main role	
1973	Jungle Kurobe	Additional voices		
1973	Doraemon	Sewashi		
1973	The Gutsy Frog	Shinpachi Gotō, Kanpei Yamashita, Tanaka	First voice of Shinpachi, Second voice of Kanpei	
1973	Little Wansa	Bumble	Main role	
1973	Microid S	Shinkichi		
1973	Miracle Girl Limit-chan	Nobuko Asami, Jun Kurimoto		
1974	Cutie Honey	Pochi		
1974	Heidi, Girl of the Alps	Village Child		
1974	Aim for the Ace!	Additional voices		
1974	Majokko Megu-chan	Rabi Kanzaki		
1974	Getter Robo	Koichi, Hiroshi		
1974	Calimero	Buta, Betty, Mrs. Pape	First voice	
1975	First Human Giatrus	Additional voices		
1975	Maya the Honey Bee	Imomushi, Kawagera, Yadoribae, Okera		
1975	Getter Robo G	Katsuya, Kamekichi		
1975	Ganso Tensai Bakabon	Bakabon	Lead role	
1976	Steel Jeeg	Saburo Yamanaka		
1976	Machine Hayabusa	Hiroshi Kamikaze		
1976	Chōdenji Robo Combattler V	Kotaro Tobita		
1976	Magne Robo Gakeen	Additional voices		
1976	Candy Candy	Young Tom		
1976	Little Lulu and Her Little Friends	Tubby		
1977	Glacier Warrior Gaislugger	Ii Taro		
1977	Jetter Mars	Kōsaku		
1977	Chōgattai Majutsu Robo Ginguiser	Taichi		
1977	Dino Mech Gaiking	Gorō		
1977	Ippatsu Kanta-kun	Santa		
1978	Majokko Tickle	Fuuko, Tadashi Yoshikawa, Kaoru Yamaya		
1978	Angie Girl	Arthur		
1978	Ikkyū-san	Additional voices		
1979	Galaxy Express 999	Boy, Newspaper Woman, Manabu Sunayama, Okamisan, Kikuo	Boy in Ep. 30	
1979	Gatchaman II	Boy A		
1979	Zenderman	Jimmy		
1979	Cyborg 009	Honko, Chiko		
1979	Story of the Knights of the Round Table: Blazing Arthur	Tom		
1979	Space Carrier Blue Noah	Dr. Sayoko Sakuramachi (Surgeon)		
1980	Burn, Arthur: The Prince of the White Horse	Pete		
1980	Fisherman Sanpei	Masaharu Kase	Main role	
1980	The Wonderful Adventures of Nils	Older Brother		
1980	Ganbare Gonbe	Gonbe	Lead role	
1980	Ganbare Genki	Sadakichi's mother, Otaki, Chindonya, Araki		
1980	Kaibutsu-kun	Black Mantle Hag, Funyara, Granny Grimm, Pengu, Puwapuwa, Additional voices	Second voice of Granny Grimm	
1980	Doraemon	Toraemon, Motoyama, Tsugeguchi	Toraemon in Ep. 433	
1981	Astro Boy	True, Dolphin	True in Ep. 22, Dolphin in Ep. 36	
1981	Hello! Sandybell	Mrs. Honor		
1981	Saikyo Robo Daioja 1	Tomkin	Debuted in Ep. 6	
1981	Dr. Slump & Arale-chan	Poop-Boy, Akiko-san, Boku-chin, Kanta		
1981	Yattodetaman	Toyotomi Hideyoshi	Debuted in Ep. 8	
1981	Bokura Mangaka: Tokiwa-sō Monogatari	Landlady, Doraemon	Television special	
1982	Asari-chan	Old woman, Aomori, Grandmother	Old woman in Ep. 3, Aomori in Ep. 7, Grandmother in Ep. 47	
1982	Ninja Hattori-kun	Grandmother		
1982	Boku Patalliro!	Patababa		
1982	The Call of the Wild	Additional voices		
1982	Two Down Full Base	Tatsuo Yamakawa	Television film	
1982	Roly-Poly Pollon – The Story of a Bratty Goddess	Eros, Additional voices		
1982	The Kabocha Wine	Masuo Masuda		
1983	Kinnikuman	Nachiguron, Kinkotsu-Obaba		
1983	Eagle Sam	Eagle Sam	Lead role	
1983	Galactic Whirlwind Sasuraiger	Carmen the 25th		
1983	Manga Aesop Monogatari	Ton		
1984	Kinnikuman: Showdown! The 7 Justice Supermen vs. The Space Samurais	Nachiguron	Television special	
1984	Gu Gu Ganmo	Sudare		
1985	Hai! Step Jun	Yutaro, Additional voices		
1985	Lupin the 3rd Part III	Queen Gretchen	Ep. 43	
1985	GeGeGe no Kitarō	Jakotsu-Baba, Zashiki-warashi, Akane's mother, Mannen, Old Woman, Sozu-ka-ba, Kasha, Shisa	Jakotsu-Baba debuts in Ep. 4	
1986	Little Ghost Q-Tarō	Yasubee		
1986	Onegai! Samia-don	Additional voices		
1986	Robotan	Additional voices		
1987	New Maple Town Stories: Palm Town Chapter	Flower Shop Owner, Maggie		
1987	Ninja Akakage	Genta		
1987	Bikkuriman	Tenshi Dan-Jack	Main role	
1988	Tatakae!! Ramenman	Bihun	Ep. 13	
1988	Himitsu no Akko-chan	Chikako, Moko's mother		
1989	Kiteretsu Daihyakka	Yone Karino, Yachiyo, Ume, Suzuko, Enchō	First voice of Yone Karino	
1989	Dragon Ball	Grandma Hakkake		
1990	Let's Go! Anpanman	Kuutan the Whale, Bakeru-kun	First voice of Kuutan the Whale, Second voice of Bakeru-kun	
1990	Shin Bikkuriman	God Emperor Jack		
1990	Chibi Maruko-chan	Shōta Yamada, Mrs. Hamazaki, Mrs. Ōishi		
1990	Chimpui	Kaiser	Ep. 18	
1991	Dragon Quest: Legend of the Hero Abel	Mokomoko's mother	Ep. 42	
1992	Ultraman Kids: 30 Million Light-Years in Search of Mother	Uranaishi Ura		
1992	Fantasy Adventure: The Adventures of Puss in Boots	Additional voices		
1992	Tsuyoshi Shikkari Shinasai	Oba-san		
1993	Dragon Ball Z	East Kaiō		
1994	Mahoujin Guru Guru	Magical Obaba		
1995	Chibi Maruko-chan	Shōta Yamada, Hamaji's mother, Mrs. Ōishi	First voice	
1995	World Fairy Tale Anime	First Pig, Cat	First Pig in Ep. 9, Cat in Ep. 23	
1996	GeGeGe no Kitarō	Sunakake Babaa		
1997	Shōnen H Ga Mita Sensō	Mother		
1998	The File of Young Kindaichi	Yurie Kimisawa	Debuts in Ep. 51	
1998	Fushigi Mahou Fan Fan Pharmacy	Liliel		
1998	Himitsu no Akko-chan	Chikako, Moko's mother		
1998	Dr. Slump	Ryōta, Akiko-san, Unchi-kun		
1998	Crayon Shin-chan	Ibirida		
1999	Shūkan Sutōrī Rando	Additional voices	Live action/anime variety show	
2000	Shinzo	Burtle	Debuted in Ep. 13	
2000	Pipo Papo Patrol-kun	Nōbo, Poppy, Kenta, Parabo, Pregnant Woman, Boy		
2000	Doki Doki Legend	Mahō Obaba		
2001	Nono-chan	Matsuko Yamada		
2002	Baby Grandma	Koume Jinguji, Ume Jinguji		
2002	Trotting Hamtaro	Devihamukun		
2002	Kirby of the Stars	Escargon's Mother		
2003	Kasumin	Donabe		
2003	One Piece	Amazon		
2004	Great Detective Conan	Tatsue Egami, Eri Senju	Tatsue Egami in Ep. 363, Eri Senju in Eps 394–396	
2005	Zatch Bell!	Riou		
2006	Nerima Daikon Brothers	Director		
2006	Majime ni Fumajime Kaiketsu Zorori	Oba-chan		
2006	Aria the Natural	Oba-san		
2006	Demashita! Powerpuff Girls Z	Lil' Arturo	Debuts in Ep. 14	
2007	GeGeGe no Kitarō	Sunakake Babaa, Yashi Otoshi, Shīsā		
2007	Bokurano	Black Koyemshi		
2007	Shugo Chara!	Nobuko Saeki		
2008	Negibōzu no Asatarō	Additional voices		
2011	Nichijou – My Ordinary Life	Yūko Aioi's mother	Debuts in Episode 9	
2015	Kurayami Santa	Kotaro, Uchūjin		

=== Theatrical films ===
List of performances in theatrical films
Year	Title	Role	Notes	Source
1965	Ore ni Tsuite Koi!	Yumiko Matsuki		
1973	Panda's Great Adventure	Pinch		
1976	Puss 'n Boots: Around the World in 80 Days	Small Mouse		
1983	Unico in the Island of Magic	Monster Child		
1984	Kinnikuman	Nachiguron		
1990	Pink: Water Bandit, Rain Bandit	Black		
1991	Dorami-chan: Wow, The Kid Gang of Bandits!	Arara	Short film	
1993	Dr. Slump & Arale-chan: N-cha! Clear Skies Over Penguin Village	Dodongadon		
1997	Crayon Shin-chan: Pursuit of the Balls of Darkness	Ball King Nakamur		
2000	Let's Go! Anpanman: The Tears of the Mermaid Princess	Sea Witch		
2001	Let's Go! Anpanman: Gomira's Star	Tartan		
2002	Crayon Shin-chan: Fierceness That Invites Storm! The Battle of the Warring States	Yoshino		
2004	Pokémon: Destiny Deoxys	Gonbe (Munchlax)		
2005	One Piece: Baron Omatsuri and the Secret Island	Keroko		
2006	The Girl Who Leapt Through Time	Grandmother		
2014	Let's Go! Anpanman: Apple Boy and the Wishes for Everyone	Kuutan the Whale		
2015	Chibi Maruko-chan: A Boy from Italy	Shōta Yamada	Final film role	

=== Video games ===
- Popful Mail (1994) (Gaw, PC Engine version)
- Kingdom Hearts II (2005) (Chicken Little)
- Dark Chronicle (????) (Future Rin)
- Super Dodge Ball (1996) (Misuzu)

=== Tokusatsu ===
- Chōriki Sentai Ohranger (1995) (voice of Bara Hungry)
- Chouriki Sentai Ohranger Movie (1995) (voice of Kabochumpkin)
- Ganbare!! Robocon (1999) (voice of Robocon)

=== Dubbing ===
- Chicken Little (Chicken Little)
- Watership Down (Pipkin)
