= List of Ashita no Joe characters =

This is a list of characters that appear in Tomorrow's Joe and its adaptations.

== Characters ==
=== Tange Gym ===
Joe Yabuki
Voiced by: Teruhiko Aoi, Kei Tomiyama (Pilot Film), Yoshito Yasuhara (Radio Drama)
Live-Action Film: Shōji Ishibashi (1970), Tomohisa Yamashita (2011)
Jō Yabuki (矢吹 丈, Yabuki Jō), nicknamed Joe (ジョー, Jō), is the protagonist of the story and an OPBF Champion and 4th in the World Ranking. He is known for his long bangs and for always wearing a worn-out beige coat and a red flat cap. Not long after birth he found himself in many orphanages and facilities. However, he quickly grew tired of the boring life and frequently escaped, eventually finding his way to the Doya Town the story takes place in.
Joe is rude and quick to fight, but he can also be very frivolous at times. Because of his rough upbringing he is a delinquent who likes his solitude, but he later grows to appreciate his new friends and rivals. He is not very good at understanding women, and essentially only treats them nice out of giri. As a result of Rikiishi's death, he temporarily suffers from yips and cannot hit people in the temple, but he later overcomes this. This allows him to move past the loss of Rikiishi.
He is a bantamweight and his specialties include the cross counter and the No Guard stance. He has extraordinary punching strength, fortitude, and fighting spirit, often standing up after taking killer blows and has been known to counter cross-counters (a double-cross), possessing a raw, natural talent for the sport. He has even countered double crosses with a triple-cross, implying he has high-level technical abilities. Following his fight with Rikiishi, he begins to better develop his guarding. During his fight with José, he even unconsciously uses José's own corkscrew punch against him. Near the end of the manga, more and more hints build up implying that he is becoming punch-drunk, a condition that is confirmed right before his fight with José. On several occasions it is hinted that he is aiming for the world championship not for his own sake, but for Rikiishi's, since he died fighting Joe and was considered a future world contender. His fate is uncertain, with some saying he died in the final panel of the comic, after José wins the match, but a pathologist, named Masahiko Ueno, said he had to have been alive in the final panel to be sitting upright.
Danpei Tange
Voiced by: Jūkei Fujioka, Takeshi Aono (Boxing Mania Video Game), Akira Nagoya (Pilot Film), Haruhiko Saitō (Radio Drama)
Live-Action Film: Ryūtarō Tatsumi (1970), Teruyuki Kagawa (2011)
Danpei Tange (丹下 段平, Tange Danpei) is Joe's boxing coach. He was formerly a boxer as well, but retired after losing his left eye. Afterwards he becomes a coach, but as shown in a flashback in episode 2, he was a harsh trainer who fell from grace after his last student threw a fight for money. He then becomes an unemployed drunkard who only changes his ways after meeting Joe. After seeing Joe's potential, he decides to bet everything on him, believing that Joe can become an extraordinary boxer. He teaches him in the form of individual tips called "For the Sake of Tomorrow" (明日のために ashita no tame ni). After Joe and Nishi are released from the juvenile detention center he takes them on as his only two trainees, he also allows them to live with him in his small shack under a bridge, which he converts into the Tange Boxing Club (丹下拳闘クラブ, Tange Kentō Kurabu). After Joe becomes a success, many other rookie boxers sign with Danpei, allowing him to start a proper gym, but keeps the old shack intact due to nostalgia.
Kanichi Nishi
Voiced by: Toku Nishio, Jirō Daruma (Tomorrow's Joe 2), Shiro Kishibe (Film), Daisuke Gōri (Boxing Mania Video Game)
Live-Action Film: Masaaki Yamamoto (1970), Katsuya (2011)
Kanichi Nishi (西寛一, Nishi Kan'ichi), referred to as Mammoth Nishi (マンモス西, Manmosu Nishi), is Joe's sparring partner. Joe initially meets him in the retention center where he is first introduced as the ruthless leader of his cell and commands the other inmates to pin down Joe, stuff a wet rag in his mouth and take turns jumping on him from the top of the bunkbeds. He and Joe meet again on the boat ride to the juvenile detention center, but this time Nishi is scared of what will happen to the two of them, and is shown to be terrified of the other inmates at first unlike Joe, who is not intimidated by them even as they are both attacked on their first night. Nishi's softer side is shown in the juvenile detention center as he and Joe become friends and he takes up boxing during the juvenile detention centre tournament, after he and Joe are released they both become training partners coached by Danpei and they live in his shack under a bridge, which is converted into a humble boxing club, they also both work together at the Hayashi family grocery store. Despite initially being portrayed as a thug, he is revealed to have a soft personality and is known for often crying at things, but overall he is friendly and polite to everyone. Unlike Joe, Nishi has only mediocre success as a boxer, not helped by him being a heavyweight, which there are few of on the Asian boxing circuit. While he briefly has more success as a Middleweight, he has trouble keeping his weight down, and is eventually forced to retire after a hand injury. He soon finds far more success co-coaching Joe, and also discovers that he has a talent for retail work helping with the Hayashi's store. This eventually leads to him marrying their daughter Noriko, and settling down as a conventional family man.

=== Shiraki Gym ===
Yōko Shiraki
Voiced by: Kazuko Nishizawa, Masako Ebisu (ep. 34~44), Emi Tanaka (Tomorrow's Joe 2), Fumi Dan (Film), Hiroko Ushida (Aoi Honō)
Live-Action Film: Yōko Takagi (1970), Karina (2011)
Yōko Shiraki (白木 葉子, Shiraki Yōko) is the head of the Shiraki Gym. Originally introduced as a wealthy girl from outside the slums, Joe first meets her when he and the slumtown kids scam her. She is eventually revealed to be the daughter of a wealthy former boxer and gym owner, and becomes heavily involved in the affairs of the Shiraki Gym. By the end of the series, she realizes she has fallen in love with Joe, and begs him not to risk his life fighting José Mendoza, to no avail. Just before his death, Joe gives her his boxing gloves as a keepsake.
Tōru Rikiishi
Voiced by: Shūsei Nakamura, Toshiyuki Hosokawa (Film), Hideyuki Hori (Boxing Mania Video Game), Kōji Shimizu (Radio Drama)
Live-Action Film: Seiichirō Kameishi (1970), Yūsuke Iseya (2011)
Tōru Rikiishi (力石 徹, Rikiishi Tōru) is Joe's most personal and significant boxing rival. The two first meet in the juvenile detention center, he was a boxer but was sentenced to the juvenile detention center because he punched an audience member half to death after they said that the match was rigged in Rikiishi's favor, enraging him. Joe challenges Rikiishi without knowing he was once a professional boxer and manages to punch him in the face once before Rikiishi knocks him out in one punch. He is quintessential in motivating Joe to start taking boxing seriously, even if his only reason is to beat Rikiishi in a rematch. Rikiishi is widely considered to be one of the most promising rookie boxers in the world, but his career is tragically cut short, as he dies immediately after his and Joe's rematch from his injuries and the toll his extreme weight loss training took on his body.
Mikinosuke Shiraki
Voiced by: Kei Wada, Tamio Ōki (Tomorrow's Joe 2)
Live-Action Film: Bontarō Miake (1970), Masahiko Tsugawa (2011)
Mikinosuke Shiraki (白木 幹之介, Shiraki Mikinosuke) is a former boxer who is now a wealthy businessman and founder of the Shiraki Gym. He immediately spots the pure talent of Rikiishi while observing him fighting in a boxing tournament in the juvenile detention center, and recruits him once Rikiishi is released, building the entire gym around Rikiishi's career. After Rikiishi's untimely death, he intends to shut the gym down but instead leaves it to his grand-daughter at her request.

=== Rivals ===
Wolf Kanagushi
Voiced by: Osamu Katō, Rokurō Naya (Tomorrow's Joe 2)
Live-Action Film: Speedy Hayase (1970), Mitsuki Koga (2011)
Wolf Kanagushi (ウルフ 金串, Urufu Kanagushi) was an up-and-coming bantamweight boxer. In order to get recognition quickly, Joe targeted the bantamweight rookie champion. Wolf was a confident and brash fighter who was easily provoked by Joe into a fist fight, ending in a double knockout. This news eventually led to the public demanding a match between them, which Wolf lost. He eventually became a thug who got defeated due to his weak jaw, and later borrowed money from Joe after rekindling their friendship. By the end of the series he finally pays it back and supports Joe for his last match, actively cheering.
Tiger Ozaki
Voiced by: Shōzō Iizuka, Hiroya Ishimaru (Tomorrow's Joe 2)
Tiger Ozaki (タイガー尾崎, Taigā Ozaki) was the bantamweight champion. Called a 'lidardlike' man by Joe, he rarely spoke, but was very cunning in diagnosing Joe's weakpoint after the fight against Rikiishi. Tiger made sure to fight Joe early in the latter's career after his traumatizing fight with Rikiishi so that he could take him on when he had the highest chance to win. Though he did using these tactics, he was eventually knocked out in seconds by Carlos.
Carlos Rivera
Voiced by: Taichirō Hirokawa, Ryūsei Nakao (Tomorrow's Joe 2), Joe Yamanaka (Film)
Carlos Rivera (カーロス・リベラ, Kārosu Ribera) is the former 6th Rank WBC Bantamweight fighter. He became known as the "beltless champion" due to having incredible skill at boxing but not actually holding a world title, it was believed that the world champion was too scared of losing their title to challenge him. He is shown to have great instinct when it comes to boxing, as he identifies Joe as an excellent boxer despite Joe not holding a title, his punches are so fast that he is able to hit his opponent in the face with his elbow without anyone seeing. He is very energetic and theatrical, often shamelessly hitting on women in the audience after the fight is due to start, which only endears him to the crowd as a womanizer. He was born in the slums of Venezuela and had a similar childhood to Joe, he is also shown dressing up as Santa Claus and giving presents to the children in the slums while he was in Japan, where he and Joe become friends. He and Joe fight to a draw in a match in which he was forced to use a technique where he tenses up all the muscles in his body at once in order to deliver punches faster than the eye can see, after this he returned to America where he finally had his chance to challenge the world champion, José Mendoza. He lost the fight due to the strain on his body from his fight with Joe, he was then hospitalized where it became clear that he had suffered serious motor neuron damage and brain damage and would not be able to fight again, Joe becomes consumed by even more guilt when he hears of this.
Kim Yong-bi
Voiced by: Norio Wakamoto (Tomorrow's Joe 2)
Kim Yong-bi (金 竜飛, Kin Ryūhi) is the Former OPBF champion. He is a South Korean boxer and a member of the military who fought in the Vietnam War in the merciless "Tiger Squad", his manager is also his superior in the army and mentor, Colonel Hyun. When he was 5 years old, the Korean War broke out and his father went off to fight, he and his mother soon became homeless and starving and one day she was killed by an incendiary bomb as Kim looked on in horror. Kim wandered alone for the next few days until he came upon an unconscious soldier lying in a pool of mud, he stole the soldier's rations but the soldier woke up and reached out to him, Kim picked up a large rock and killed the soldier in fear, before eating all of the rations. When he returned to his village a group of soldiers led by Hyun started to interrogate the villagers over who had killed the soldier, when Kim heard the soldier's name was Kim Chung-ryun he realised that the man he had killed was his father, and vomited up the rations he had stolen. Since then he has suffered from a permanent loss of appetite and also seems to suffer from PTSD as he is shown to have a habit of washing his hands for hours at a time to get "blood" off of them, in addition to this he becomes extremely distressed at the sight of blood and has a tendency to start attacking the bleeding person in front of him. He has a reputation as the "human computer" due to his cold demeanour and calculated methods of boxing, which includes his "Chom-Chom" (舞々(チョムチョム), Chomuchomu; written with the character for "dance") technique where he knocks down his opponent but stops them from falling to the ground by keeping them standing up with a flurry of punches, this technique is said to have killed two of his opponents in the past. During his fight with Joe he gets distressed from the way Joe keeps getting up no matter how many times he knocks him down even after using his Chom-Chom, calling Joe a "monster", in the 6th round he is knocked out of the ring by Joe and loses his title to him, after which he retires from boxing.
Harimau
Voiced by: Takashi Taguchi (Tomorrow's Joe 2)
Harimau (ハリマオ, Harimao) is a wild, illiterate Malaysian tribesman who was only interested in exciting fights and chocolate, and challenged Joe for his OPBF belt. The match was orchestrated by Yōko to rekindle Joe's wild spirit. Harimaru relies on a very unorthodox style that skirts close to being outright illegal, utilizing jumps and agility far more than traditional boxing. Most of his techniques only avoid disqualification because there are no specific rules against them.
José Mendoza
Voiced by: Yoshito Miyamura (Tomorrow's Joe 2), Masami Okada (film)
José Mendoza (ホセ・メンドーサ, Hose Mendōsa) is the perfect champion who had never lost, fought beautifully and was admired by all. He takes great care of his health and family, and is constantly calm and confident, giving an aura of being truly unbeatable. A recurring theme is his immense physical strength, to the point of leaving big bruises on Joe's body by gripping him, easily forcing him into a handshake, and even bending coins with his fingers. However, Joe eventually discovers that José has one weakness; despite his speed, strength and stamina, he can't take hits nearly as well, and relies on avoiding getting hit as much as possible. He begins to break down from this during the later stages of his fight with Joe, where he loses his cool and fears for his life against Joe's unrelenting spirit. Mendoza was knocked down for the first time in his career during the fight, and even fouled Joe violently in a moment of terror. He would win the decision, but the trauma his body suffers from the fight ages him prematurely.

=== Doya Town ===
==== Neighborhood Kids ====
Sachi
Voiced by: Fuyumi Shiraishi
Live-Action Film: Rina Hatakeyama (2011)
Sachi (サチ) is a young girl from Doya town who hangs out with the group of children who follow after Joe. Being the only girl in the group, she often tries to act feminine but is actually the most hotheaded member of the group, usually getting very angry with the others and hitting them with her trademark geta. She also has a crush on Joe.
Kinoko
Voiced by: Keiko Ushizaki, Junko Hori (Tomorrow's Joe 2)
Kinoko (キノコ) is a member of the group who wears a newsboy cap similar to Joe and often makes inappropriate jokes such as greeting Joe like a Yakuza member while in the middle of a police station.
Tarō
Voiced by: Hiroshi Masuoka, Kiyonobu Suzuki (Tomorrow's Joe 2)
Tarō (太郎) is the most mature member of the group, making him the leader by default. He wears an unbuttoned gakuran with a white shirt underneath. He and the rest of the gang picked a fight with Joe when Joe first arrived in the slum town, they lost but ended up becoming friends with Joe and frequently hanging out with him.
Chūkichi
Voiced by: Kaneta Kimotsuki, Noriko Tsukase (Tomorrow's Joe 2)
Chūkichi (チュー吉), renamed Hyoromatsu (ヒョロ松) in the first anime, is a member of the group who wears a button-down collared short-sleeved shirt, has thin strands of hair and pronounced buck teeth with a taller, thinner physique than the other members of the group.
Tonkichi
Voiced by: Jōji Yanami, Hiroko Maruyama (Tomorrow's Joe 2)
Tonkichi (トン吉) is by far the strangest looking member of the group, with a misshaped bald head, red puffed cheeks, swollen lips and a thousand-yard cross-eyed stare, he usually wears either a tank top or a long-sleeved shirt.
Chibi
Voiced by: Mitsuko Asō
Chibi (チビ) is the smallest member of the group, he has very small eyes and hair that sticks out, he sometimes wears a straw hat. He has very few lines and despite appearing all the way through the manga, he does not make an appearance in the second anime series.

==== Hayashi Family ====
Noriko Hayashi
Voiced by: Kaoru Ozawa, Kei Moriwaki (Tomorrow's Joe 2)
Noriko Hayashi (林 紀子, Hayashi Noriko) is the teenage daughter of the owners of the local grocery store. She has a schoolgirl crush on Joe, which develops into romantic feelings as she matures but Joe initially does not notice her feelings and is even implied to be ignoring them, she also disapproves of his boxing career, believing that Joe was on a suicidal path after bring consumed with guilt for inadvertently causing Rikiishi's death, in the end nothing ever happens between them. Instead, she becomes involved with, and eventually marries Nishi shortly before the end of the series, but is not shown to be especially happy with her choice.
Keishichi Hayashi
Voiced by: Setsuo Wakui, Minoru Yada (Tomorrow's Joe 2)
Keishichi Hayashi (林 敬七, Hayashi Keishichi) is the co-owner of the local grocery store that Joe and Nishi work at. He is significantly more even-tempered than his wife, he generously gives Joe and Nishi jobs at his shop after they're released from the juvenile detention center.
Tamako Hayashi
Voiced by: Teruko Abe, Shō Saitō (Tomorrow's Joe 2)
Tamako Hayashi (林 玉子, Hayashi Tamako) is Keishichi's wife and the co-owner of the grocery store, she scolds Joe often.

=== Other characters ===
Mamoru Aoyama
Voiced by: Kiyoshi Komiyama, Shigeru Chiba (Tomorrow's Joe 2)
Live-Action Film: Masao Komatsu (1970)
Mamoru Aoyama (青山 まもる, Aoyama Mamoru) was an inmate at the juvenile detention center. Often picked on by the other inmates due to his short stature and feeble nature, he received some training from Danpei, who teaches him dodging techniques that make him a hard opponent to fight against, even managing to score a win against one of the toughest inmates during the juvie boxing tournament. He is also seen having grown up and gotten a job towards the very end of the series, attending Joe's fight against José along with some of the other former inmates.
Goromaki Gondō
Voiced by: Chikao Ōtsuka, Takeshi Watabe (Tomorrow's Joe 2)
Goromaki Gondō (ゴロマキ 権藤) is a smartly-dressed bodyguard often hired by the Yakuza. Joe meets him while wandering around after his fight with Rikiishi, where he sees him getting into a fight with Wolf where he easily overpowers the former boxer. Joe breaks up the fight and later has a conversation with Gondo which encourages him to return to boxing. When Wolf asks him what "Goromaki" means he says it means "brawl" in the Yakuza underworld.
Harry Robert
Voiced by: Takeshi Kuwabara, Michihiro Ikemizu (Tomorrow's Joe 2)
Harry Robert (ハリー・ロバート, Harī Robāto) is Carlos Rivera's manager and longtime friend. The two travel around the world looking for worthy opponents for Carlos, he is given a proposition by Yōko for Carlos to fight Joe which he accepts, subsequently travelling to Japan with Carlos. He and Carlos often find themselves having to look for opponents in different countries due to the fact that wherever Carlos goes he quickly gains a reputation as being such a good fighter that nobody wants to challenge him, forcing them to go to a country where he is less known.
Jun Shioya
Voiced by: Keiko Yokozawa (Tomorrow's Joe 2)
Jun Shioya (塩谷 ジュン, Shioya Jun) is Wolf's ex-fiancée, her father runs a boxing gym which Wolf comes to live at after hitting rock bottom. It is unconfirmed whether or not they reunite by the end of the series, but they remain on friendly terms.
Jirō Shioya
Voiced by: Yoku Shioya (Tomorrow's Joe 2)
Jirō Shioya (塩谷 ジロー, Shioya Jirō) is Jun's little brother, part of a biker gang. However Joe tells him that he sees boxing potential in him, causing him to quit the gang and pursue a boxing career.
