= Andersen Monogatari (TV series) =

Japanese anime television series

- Zucko and Canty, two pixies that serve as the series' mascots.
- Also known as: Paramount Pictures Presents Hans Christian Andersen
- アンデルセン物語
- Genre: Fantasy
- Created by: Hans Christian Andersen
- Music by: Seiichirō Uno
- Country of origin: Japan
- Original language: Japanese
- No. of episodes: 52

Production
- Producer: Masami Iwasaki
- Production company: Mushi Production

Original release
- Network: FNS (Fuji TV)
- Release: January 3 – December 26, 1971

Andersen Stories (アンデルセン物語, Anderusen Monogatari), known outside Japan as Paramount Pictures Presents Hans Christian Andersen, is a Japanese anime anthology series based on the stories of Hans Christian Andersen which aired on Fuji TV from January 3 to December 26, 1971. It consists of 52 episodes and planned by Zuiyo Enterprise and produced by Mushi Production.

The show is a third entry in the Calpis Comic Theater, a precursor of the World Masterpiece Theater series. Zuiyo Enterprise would split in 1975 into Nippon Animation and Zuiyo Company, which retained the rights of the series along with Mushi Production. Nippon Animation employed some of the anime's production staff and continued with the World Masterpiece Theater franchise.

== Premise ==
The series has been broadcast three years after The World of Hans Christian Andersen (Anderusen Monogatari, 1968), an eponymous and thematically similar feature film produced by Toei Animation. The film and the series also have in common composer Seiichirō Uno, lyricist Hisashi Inoue, screenplay writer Morihisa Yamamoto and voice actress Eiko Masuyama.

In the TV series, some Andersen tales were each told in one episode, while others were told over several episodes, for a total of 31 storylines spanning 52 episodes.

Two pixies were used as a framing device, which was also done in Grimm's Fairy Tale Classics. Many different staff members were encouraged to vary their styles, often taking liberties. Several episodes were serious and dramatic, while others were light-hearted.

In English-speaking countries, the series was released in the 1970s by Paramount Television under the title Paramount Pictures Presents Hans Christian Andersen. ATLAB Australia was hired to dub the anime. The English adaptation by Noel Judd kept the original jazz-rock Japanese musical score, while often altering some character names and dialogues, sometimes in order to change overly sad endings (as in episode 5). Episodes from the English dub are currently difficult to find.

The English adaptation of the series also served as a basis for dubs that aired in other countries outside Japan during the 1980s, such as Italy (in syndication), Germany (Sat.1 and Kabel.1), Catalonia (TV3), Bulgaria (BT1), Mexico (XEQ-TV Canal 9), Greece (ERT and ET3), Turkey (TRT) and in the Middle East (Kuwait Television).

== Synopsis ==
In order to sign up to the University of the Fairy Land, it is necessary to collect 101 magic cards that appear out of nowhere when a good deed is performed. The pixies Bubbles and Bingo (Canty and Zucko in Japanese) have the opportunity to appear in the world of Andersen's fairy tales to try to modify the endings for the better: they will therefore try to intervene in the plots of fairy tales to change the course, but without much success. By the end of the series, she does not even get the full collection and could not care less.

== Cast and characters ==
- Eiko Masuyama as Canty (キャンティ, Kyanti), Bubbles in English dub, a clumsy but romantic female shapeshifting apprentice pixie, who dreams to become a princess. Similar in appearance to a pig, she has thick blonde hair, a tail of the same color and wears a burgundy bodysuit. Masuyama also voiced Anna, the little match girl in the last episode.
- Yasuo Yamada as Zucko (ズッコ, Zukko), Bingo in English dub, Bubbles' mischievous male pixie companion who constantly teases her. He has brown curly hair, a tail of the same color and he's completely naked.
- Minori Matsushima – Ugly Duckling (eps. 1–2), Rudy (eps. 38–40), Svane (ep. 48)
- Ranko Mizuki – Mother Duck (eps. 1–2)
- Michiko Hirai – Ida (ep. 3), Ming Ming (eps. 11–12), Betty Ball (ep. 20), Helga (eps. 22–23), Yvonne (eps. 25–26), Lara (ep. 30), Little Mermaid/Aqua (eps. 31–33), Laura (ep. 44), Marte (ep. 48), Snow Queen (eps. 50–51), Anna's Mother (ep. 52)
- Yoshiko Yamamoto – Tin Soldier (ep. 4), Mouse (ep. 6), Ketty/Karen (eps. 42–43)
- Reiko Mutō – Mother (ep. 5) Psyche/Cassandra (ep. 49)
- Kei Tomiyama – Tom (ep. 6), Swallow (eps. 9–10)
- Mahito Tsujimura – Sultan (ep. 6), Satyr (eps. 13–14), Hans/Larson (eps. 42–43)
- Kazuko Sawada – Princess (ep. 6), Mermaid Sister (eps. 31, 33), Sea Witch (ep. 32), Greta (ep. 34)
- Yoko Kuri – Thumbelina (eps. 7–10)
- Natsuko Kawaji – Johanna/Lisa, Thumbelina's Mother (eps. 7–10)
- Junko Hori – Witch (eps. 7–10)
- Ichirō Nagai – Kuppe (eps. 7–10)
- Terue Nunami – Lady Mouse (eps. 9–10)
- Junpei Takiguchi – Mole (eps. 9–10)
- Hiroko Maruyama – Flower Prince (ep. 10)
- Kōsei Tomita – Emperor of China (eps. 11–12), Emperor (ep. 37), King (ep. 44)
- Keiichi Noda – Fisherman/Wong (eps. 11–12)
- Yoshiko Ōta – Shepherdess Ellen (eps. 13–14), Young Ole (ep. 24)
- Sumiko Shirakawa – Chimney Sweep Chris (ep. 13–14), Peter/Johann (eps. 27–29), Carl (eps. 42–43)
- Kōji Yada – Chen, Ellen's Grandfather/Stepfather (eps. 13–14), Soldier (ep. 37)
- Masako Nozawa – Marco (ep. 15), Paul (ep. 30), Kay (eps. 50–51)
- Kimie Nakajima – Woman (ep. 15)
- Kinto Tamura – Painter Angelo (ep. 15), Father (ep. 18), Sea Lion (eps. 31, 33), Minister (ep. 37)
- Kiyoshi Komiyama – Hans (eps. 16–17), Swineherd Prince (ep. 34)
- Hiroko Suzuki – Princess (eps. 16–17), Princess (ep. 29), Christine (eps. 35–36)
- Taichirō Hirokawa – Capo Capo (ep. 19), Ib (eps. 35–36)
- Nobuyo Ōyama – Top (ep. 20)
- Ushio Shima – Marsh King (eps. 21–23)
- Haruko Kitahama – Cassandra/Selima (eps. 21–23)
- Kiyoshi Kobayashi – Viking King (eps. 21–23)
- Hiroko Mori – Viking's Wife Liya/Gerda (eps. 21–23)
- Makio Inoue – Prince Arsid (ep. 23), Travelling Companion (eps. 27–29)
- Michiko Nomura – Ilze (ep. 24), Gerda (eps. 50–51)
- Toshiya Ueda – Ole the Dream-god (ep. 24)
- Keiko Tomochika – Maru Maru (ep. 24), Mermaid Sister (eps. 31–32), Princess Milene/Frida (ep. 33), Milia (ep. 37)
- Mie Azuma – Jens (eps. 25–26)
- Osamu Saka – Jens' Father (eps. 25–26), King Neptune (eps. 31–32)
- Jōji Yanami – Bishop (eps. 25–26)
- Takuzō Kamiyama – Doctor Satan (eps. 25–26)
- Sachiko Chijimatsu – Mary/Lily (eps. 27–29), Garbo (ep. 34), Ellen (ep. 41)
- Masashi Amenomori – Circus Owner (eps. 27–28), Anna's Father (ep. 52)
- Ryusuke Shiomi – Cat (ep. 30), Babette's Father (eps. 38–40)
- Akio Nojima – Prince (eps. 31–33)
- Kineko Nakamura – Nanny/Grandmother (eps. 31–33)
- Hiroko Kikuchi – Mermaid Sister (eps. 31–33)
- Yoshiko Matsuo – Maria (ep. 34), Eliza (eps. 45–47)
- Keiko Yamamoto – Ib as a Child (eps. 35–36), Hans (ep. 37), Peter (ep. 44)
- Kinya Aikawa – Bilt (ep. 37), Little Claus (ep. 41)
- Shinsuke Chikaishi – Big Claus (ep. 41)
- Junji Chiba – Jeppe, Ib's Father (eps. 35–36), Storyteller (ep. 49)
- Noriko Ohara – Ferone the Ice Maiden (eps. 38–40)
- Miyoko Asō – Ferone's Nanny/Vertigo (eps. 38–40)
- Masako Ebisu – Babette (eps. 38–40)
- Kōichi Kitamura – Carl's Father (eps. 42–43)
- Toshiko Maeda – Carl's Mother (eps. 42–43)
- Gentarō Inoue – Johann/Andy (eps. 42–43), Neighbor Prince/King Frederick (eps. 46–47)
- Shin Kunisaka – God (ep. 44)
- Kōhei Miyauchi – Eliza's Father (eps. 45–47)
- Kazue Takahashi – Evil Queen Carla (eps. 45–47), Kirt/Kirk (ep. 49)
- Shingo Kanemoto – Bad Priest (ep. 47)
- Yonehiko Kitagawa – Zeus (ep. 49)
- Kazuko Sugiyama – Yurika (ep. 51)

=== Additional English voices ===
- Barbara Frawley
- Beryl Marshall
- Derani Scarr
- Jane Harders
- Jinx Lootens
- Noel Judd
- Phillip Hinton
- Robin Stewart
- Roy Hartley

== Episodes ==
No.	Title	Original release date
1	"The Ugly Duckling - Part 1" / "The Ugly Duckling (Come Play With Me)" -「みにくいあひるの子(ぼくとあそぼうよ)」- "Minikui ahirunoko (boku to asobou yo)"	3 January 1971
2	"The Ugly Duckling - Part 2" / "The Ugly Duckling (Goodbye Mother)" - みにくいあひるの子(さようならママ)」- "Minikui ahirunoko (sayōnara mama)"	10 January 1971
3	"Little Ida's Flowers" - 「イーダちゃんの花」- "Īda-chan no hana"	17 January 1971
4	"The Steadfast Tin Soldier" / "The Tin Soldier" -「鉛の兵隊」- "Namari no heitai"	24 January 1971
5	"The Story of a Mother" / "Don't Give Up Mother" -「がんばれママ」- "Ganbare mama"	31 January 1971
After Death himself takes her son away from her, a lonely mother tracks her son down to a garden after getting blinded, wounded, and losing her ride. There, Death tells her that even if she returns her son, he will suffer, but if he is allowed to be in heaven, he will be reborn in another life with a rich and happy outlook on life. Hearing that, the mother with a sombre heart accepts her son's death and looks upon a new day with a hopeful outlook.
6	"The Flying Bag" -「空とぶカバン」- "Sora tobu kaban"	7 February 1971
Unlike in the story, the kid does marry the princess after solving the firework debacle by himself.
7	"Thumbelina - Part 1" / "Thumb Princess (Gribbit Groom)" -「親指姫(ケロケロ花ムコさん)」- "Oyayubi hime (kerokero hana Muko-san)"	14 February 1971
8	"Thumbelina - Part 2" / "Thumb Princess (Buzzing Contest)" -「親指姫(ぶんぶんコンテスト)」- "Oyayubi hime (bunbun kontesuto)"	21 February 1971
9	"Thumbelina - Part 3" / "Thumb Princess (Mole Groom)" -「親指姫(モックラ花ムコさん)」- "Oyayubi hime (mokkura hana Muko-san)"	28 February 1971
10	"Thumbelina - Part 4" / "Thumb Princess (Lovely Flower Prince)" -「親指姫(スキスキ花の王子)」- "Oyayubi hime (suki suki hana no ōji)"	7 March 1971
Four part episode and longest story arc in the series, also screened as a feature-length film at the Toei Cartoon Festival that same year on July 18. Here, the witch who gave the lonely parents Thumbelina serves an antagonistic role, and the climax involves a full-on battle between the flower prince's forces and the mice legion.
11	"The Nightingale - Part 1" / "The Nightingale (The King's Favorite)" -「ナイチンゲール(王様のお気に入り)」- "Naichingēru (ōsama no okiniiri)"	14 March 1971
12	"The Nightingale - Part 2" / "The Nightingale (Smiling Through Tears)" -「ナイチンゲール(涙でニッコリ)」- "Naichingēru (namida de nikkori)"	21 March 1971
13	"The Shepherdess and the Chimney Sweep - Part 1" / "Wayward Ellen (Happiness Is in the Starry Sky)" -「じゃじゃ馬エレン(しあわせは青空に)」- "Jaja uma Eren (shiawase wa aozora ni)"	28 March 1971
14	"The Shepherdess and the Chimney Sweep - Part 2" / "Wayward Ellen (Lovely Chris)" -「じゃじゃ馬エレン(すてきなクリス)」- "Jaja uma Eren (sutekina Kurisu)"	4 April 1971
15	"The Bronze Boar" / "Square With Pictures" -「絵のある広場 - "E no aru hiroba"	11 April 1971
Based on "The Metal Pig", the main character Marco runs away with a like-minded artist guy to any place that would appreciate their talents, but before that they made sure to adorn the whole city square with graffiti and frescoes.
16	"The Tinderbox - Part 1" / "The Magic Tinder-box (A Monster Jumped Out)" -「魔法の火うち箱(とびだした怪獣)」- "Mahō no hi uchi hako (tobidashita kaijū)"	18 April 1971
17	"The Tinderbox - Part 2" / "The Magic Tinder-box (The Loveliest Treasure)" -「魔法の火うち箱(一番ステキな宝物)」- "Mahō no hi uchi hako (ichiban sutekina takaramono)"	25 April 1971
18	"What the Old Man Does is Always Right" / "My Dad's the Best in the World" -「ぼくの父さん世界」 - "Boku no tōsan sekaiichi"	2 May 1971
This is a loose adaptation of the original. A deceitful person gets his comeuppance for taking advantage of a kind and considerate family.
19	"The Shadow" / "Where Is My Shadow?" -「オレの影は どこにいる?」- "Ore no kage wa doko ni iru?"	9 May 1971
A loose adaptation set during modern times in an Italian-American neighborhood. In that neighborhood, a ruthless gang led by a notorious mafia don, named don Poco, led a reign of thievery and looting. No one could challenge him, except for his shadow, who was the one to take up measures against him. In the end, the don was forced to abandon his ways and make sure that no one would follow in his path.
20	"The Top and the Ball" / "Friendship Is Forever" - なかよしはいつまでも」- "Nakayoshi wa itsu made mo"	16 May 1971
After much perseverance, the Top gets the respect he deserves and gets adorned with celebratory paint, while the arrogant Ball gets left in the gutter deservedly so.
21	"The Marsh King's Daughter - Part 1" / "The Marsh King's Daughter (Cursed Father and Child)" -「沼の王の娘(呪われた親子)」- "Numa no ō no musume (norowareta oyako)"	23 May 1971
22	"The Marsh King's Daughter - Part 2" / "The Marsh King's Daughter (Helga's Secret)" -「沼の王の娘(ヘルガの秘密)」- "Numa no ō no musume (Heruga no himitsu)"	30 May 1971
23	"The Marsh King's Daughter - Part 3" / "The Marsh King's Daughter (The Glow of Love)" -「沼の王の娘(愛のかがやき)」- "Numa no ō no musume (ai no kagayaki)"	6 June 1971
A faithful three episodes adaptation, but removes religious themes and shortens the original ending.
24	"Ole Lukoie the Dustman" / "Ole the Dream-god"-「ねむりの精 オーレ」- "Nemuri no sei Ōre"	13 June 1971
Uncle Ole Luke, the dream god teaches Elsa not to be a difficult child but be an obedient one.
25	"Bishop of B'rglemn and His Families - Part 1" / "Jens' Adventure (Mysterious Boerglum Island)" -「イエンスの冒険(謎のベアグル島)」- "Iensu no bōken (nazo no Beaguru Shima)"	20 June 1971
26	"Bishop of B'rglemn and His Families - Part 2" / "Jens' Adventure (Setting Sail for Battle)" -「イエンスの冒険(たたかいの船出)」- "Iensu no bōken (tatakai no funade)"	27 June 1971
Episode in two parts is based on "The Bishop of Børglum and His Kinsmen". Unlike the actual story, the two part story has a drawn climactic battle between Jens Glob, who is a teen woodcutter against Bergleman, a villain, with aspirations to conquer the world.
27	"The Traveling Companions - Part 1" / "The Travelling Companion (Mysterious Boy)" -「旅の道づれ(ふしぎな少年)」- "Tabi no michidzure (fushigina shōnen)"	4 July 1971
28	"The Traveling Companions - Part 2" / "The Travelling Companion (The Doll That Moved)" -「旅の道づれ(動きだした人形)」- "Tabi no michidzure (ugoki dashita ningyō)"	11 July 1971
29	"The Traveling Companions - Part 3" / "The Travelling Companion (Farewell, Friend)" -「旅の道づれ(友よ！さらば)」- "Tabi no michidzure (tomoyo! Saraba)"	18 July 1971
Based on "The Travelling Companion", but taking some liberties. The main character does not marry the cursed princess but the newly added character of the circus girl.
30	"The Most Incredible Thing" / "An Unbelievable Story" -「とても信じられないこと」- "Totemo shinji rarenaikoto"	25 July 1971
The most incredible thing was not a self-repairing entertainment system but rather a boy who wanted to appreciate his first love for a girl and not want to let her go, refusing the offer to marry the princess in the process.
31	"The Little Mermaid - Part 1" / "Princess Mermaid (Beloved Prince)" -「人魚姫(あこがれの王子さま)」- "Ningyo hime (akogare no ōji-sama)"	1 August 1971
32	"The Little Mermaid - Part 2" / "Princess Mermaid (Promise to the Witch)" -「人魚姫(魔女とのちかい)」- "Ningyo hime (majo to no chikai)"	8 August 1971
33	"The Little Mermaid - Part 3" / "Princess Mermaid (Unhappy Parting)" -「人魚姫(かなしいお別れ)」- "Ningyo hime (kanashī o wakare)"	15 August 1971
34	"The Swineherd" / "The Prince Is the Swineherd" -「王子さまは ブタの番人」- "Ōji-sama wa buta no ban'nin"	22 August 1971
Loose mashup with the story of Cinderella.
35	"Ib and Little Christina - Part 1" / "The Three Acorns (A Tiny Promise)" -「三つのクルミ(ちっちゃな約束)」- "Mittsu no kurumi (chitchana yakusoku)"	29 August 1971
36	"Ib and Little Christina - Part 2" / "The Three Acorns (Reunion)" -「三つのクルミ(めぐりあい)」- "Mittsu no kurumi (meguriai)"	5 September 1971
37	"The Emperor's New Clothes" / "The Naked King" -「裸の王様」- "Hadaka no ōsama"	12 September 1971
38	"The Ice Maiden - Part 1" / "The Ice Maiden (Rudy Is Popular)" -「氷姫(ルーディは人気者)」- "Kōri hime (Rūdi wa ninki-sha)"	19 September 1971
39	"The Ice Maiden - Part 2" / "The Ice Maiden (Ferone's Worries)" -「氷姫(フェローネのなやみ)」- "Kōri hime (Ferōne no nayami)"	26 September 1971
40	"The Ice Maiden - Part 3" / "The Ice Maiden (Sad Babette)" -「氷姫(かなしみのバベッティ)」- "Kōri hime (kanashimi no Babettei)"	3 October 1971
41	"Great Claus and Little Claus" / "Little Claus and Big Claus -「小クラウス大クラウス」- "Ko Kurausu dai Kurausu"	10 October 1971
Unlike the original, this version ends with the two Claus burying the hatchet, settling their differences and sharing their responsibilities like proper adults.
42	"The Red Shoes - Part 1" / "The Red Shoes (Shabby Travelling Troup)" -「赤いくつ(旅のおんぼろ一座)」- "Akai kutsu (tabi no onboro ichiza)"	17 October 1971
43	"The Red Shoes - Part 2" / "The Red Shoes (Comic Hall of Flowers)" -「赤いくつ(花のコミックホール)」- "Akai kutsu (hana no komikku hōru)"	24 October 1971
A loose comedic two episodes retelling of the darker original story. Unlike the original, this one has a whole circus troupe family discovering the magical red shoes and dealing with the aftermath of it.
44	"The Bad Lord" / "The Angel and the Bee" -「天使とみつばち」- "Tenshi to mitsubachi"	31 October 1971
Free adaptation of "The Wicked Prince".
45	"The Wild Swans - Part 1" / "The Wild Swans (The Haunted Castle)" -「野の白鳥(呪われたお城)」- "No no hakuchō (norowareta o shiro)"	7 November 1971
46	"The Wild Swans - Part 2" / "The Wild Swans (The Nettle's Secret)" -「野の白鳥(イラクサのひみつ)」- "No no hakuchō (irakusa no himitsu)"	14 November 1971
47	"The Wild Swans - Part 3" / "The Wild Swans (Don't Give Up Eliza)" -「野の白鳥(がんばれエリサ)」- "No no hakuchō (ganbare Erisa)"	21 November 1971
Based on "The Wild Swans" and partly on "The Six Swans".
48	"The Old Street Lamp" / "Two People's Secret" -「二人の秘密」- "Futari no himitsu"	28 November 1971
Loosely inspired by "The Old Street Lamp", the story centers on two love birds, Swane and Malty, who were initially lying to each other about their background. One is a washerwoman, while another is a thieving street child. When they do become aware of that, they decide to become an official couple with a dog.
49	"Psyche" -「プシケ」- "Pushike"	5 December 1971
Loose retelling of Andersen's story directed by Osamu Dezaki, with setting shifted from Renaissance Rome to Ancient Greece. Here the protagonist, named Kilt, falls in love with Psyche, but as she looked nothing like the original Psyche and the Psyche statue was finished, Kilt could not care less about why Psyche originally left or why she came back in an adult form. Angered Psyche took the chisel and was about to destroy the statue with it but Kilt got in the way and he died.
50	"The Snow Queen - Part 1" / "The Snow Queen (Evil Mirror)" -「雪の女王 (あくまの鏡)」- "Yuki no joō (akuma no kagami)"	12 December 1971
Gerda's grandmother tells the story about the Evil Mirror and the evil Snow Queen to Gerda and Kai. A fragment of the mirror gets in Kai's heart and he is kidnapped by the Snow Queen. Gerda must find her friend Kai and embark on her dangerous adventure.
51	"The Snow Queen - Part 2" / "The Snow Queen (Battle in the Land of Death)" -「雪の女王 (死の国のたたかい)」- "Yuki no joō (shi no kuni no tatakai)"	19 December 1971
Gerda must sets off to the Land of Death to save her precious friend Kai from the evil Snow Queen. Gerda's power of love is a key to cure and free Kai's curse and defeat the evil Snow Queen.
52	"The Little Match Girl" -「マッチ売りの少女」- "Matchi uri no shōjo"	26 December 1971

== Music ==
All songs in the series are composed and arranged by Seiichirō Uno, and written together with Hisashi Inoue and Morihisa Yamamoto.

Opening theme

"Mr. Andersen" (ミスターアンデルセン) by Taeko Sakurai with Young Fresh

Ending theme

1) "Canty's song" (キャンティのうた, Kyanti no Uta) by Eiko Masuyama with Young Fresh (27 episodes)

2) "Zucko's song" (ズッコのうた, Zukko no Uta) by Yasuo Yamada with Young Fresh (25 episodes)

== Releases ==
Andersen Stories has been released both on VHS and DVD in Japan.

In 2005, Nippon Columbia released the entire series on DVD, celebrating Andersen's 200th birth anniversary. A selection of episodes (in no particular order) was first released in January, as 5 single DVDs: "The Ugly Duckling", "The Little Mermaid", "The Red Shoes", "The Wild Swans" and "The Little Match Girl" along with "The Snow Queen".

The DVD box was released in three volumes from March of the same year: BOX 1 as a 5-disc set on March 23; BOX 2 as a 4-disc set on June 29; and BOX 3 as a 5-disc set on September 28.

A "Complete Box", a set of all 14 volumes, was also released in December 2008. The episode's order of each volume does not always match the actual broadcasting order.

The original soundtrack album by Seiichirō Uno was re-issued as a 2-disc CD, containing songs not used in the series.

With the exception of a 5-episode DVD issued in Germany, the series has never been released on home video outside Japan.

== International titles ==
- Andersen Stories (Literal English)
- Hans Christian Andersen (English)
- Paramount Pictures Presents Hans Christian Andersen (alternative English)
- Le fiabe di Andersen (Italian)
- Pixi in Wolkenkuckucksheim (German)
- Las fábulas de Hans Christian Andersen (Spanish)
- Τα Παραμύθια του Άντερσεν (Greek)
- لمياء وتابعها شيكو (Arabic)
- アンデルセン物語 (Japanese)
- Andersen Masalları (Turkish)
- Truyện cổ tích Andersen (Vietnamese)
