= The Secret of Akko-chan =

Japanese manga series by Fujio Akatsuka and its adaptations

- Cover of the DVD box of the 1969 anime series

ひみつのアッコちゃん (Himitsu no Akko-chan)
- Genre: Comedy, Magical girl, Romance
- Manga
- Written by: Fujio Akatsuka
- Published by: Shueisha
- Magazine: Ribon
- Original run: July 1962 – September 1965
- Volumes: 3
- Anime television series
- Directed by: Hiroshi Ikeda
- Music by: Asei Kobayashi
- Studio: Toei Animation
- Original network: NET
- Original run: 6 January 1969 – 26 October 1970
- Episodes: 94
- Anime television series
- Directed by: Hiroki Shibata
- Produced by: Kenji Yokoyama; Hiromi Seki
- Music by: Yusuke Honma
- Studio: Toei Animation
- Original network: FNS (Fuji TV)
- Original run: January 9, 1988 – December 24, 1989
- Episodes: 61
- Anime film
- Directed by: Hiroki Shibata
- Written by: Junki Takegami
- Music by: Yusuke Honma
- Studio: Toei Animation
- Released: March 18, 1989
- Anime film

Himitsu no Akko-chan Umi da! Obake da!! Natsu Matsuri
- Directed by: Takashi Hisaoka
- Written by: Hiroyuki Hoshiyama
- Music by: Yusuke Honma
- Studio: Toei Animation
- Released: July 15, 1989
- Anime television series
- Directed by: Hiroki Shibata
- Music by: Masahiro Kawasaki
- Studio: Toei Animation
- Original network: FNS (Fuji TV)
- Original run: April 5, 1998 – February 28, 1999
- Episodes: 44
- Live-action film

Akko-chan: The Movie
- Directed by: Yasuhiro Kawamura
- Written by: Masatoshi Yamaguchi; Mika Omori; Masaharu Fukuma
- Music by: Koji Endo
- Studio: Nippon Television
- Released: September 1, 2012
- Runtime: 120 minutes

The Secret of Akko-chan (ひみつのアッコちゃん, Himitsu no Akko-chan) is a magical girl manga series written and illustrated by Fujio Akatsuka. The story centers around an elementary school girl who is gifted a magic mirror that allows her to transform into anything she chooses, and the misadventures that follow. It was published in Shueisha's monthly Ribon magazine from 1962 to 1965. While Akko-chan predates the Sally the Witch manga, the Sally anime adaptation predates Akko-chan's.

The first Himitsu no Akko-chan anime adaptation ran for 94 episodes from 1969 to 1970. It was animated by Toei Animation and broadcast by TV Asahi (formerly known as NET). It has been remade twice, in 1988 (61 episodes, featuring Mitsuko Horie in the role of Akko-chan and singing the opening and ending themes) and in 1998 (44 episodes).

The movies Himitsu no Akko-chan Movie and Umi da! Obake da!! Natsu Matsuri were both produced and released in 1989.

A live-action feature film adaptation titled in English as Akko-chan: The Movie was released by Shochiku on September 1, 2012. Directed by Yasuhiro Kawamura, it stars Haruka Ayase, Masaki Okada, Takeshi Kaga, and Teruyuki Kagawa.

An adaptation of the series ran as a web manga, ひみつのアッコちゃん μ (Himitsu no Akko-Chan μ, pronounced "myu"), written by Hiroshi Izawa, and drawn by Futago Kamikita.

== Plot ==
Atsuko Kagami is a childlike, arrogant elementary school girl who has an affinity for mirrors. One day, her favorite mirror which was given to Akko by her mother (or in some versions, by her father, as a present from India) is broken, and she prefers to bury it in her yard rather than throw it in the trash can.

In her dreams, she is contacted by a spirit (or in some cases the Queen of the Mirror Kingdom) who is touched that the girl would treat the mirror so respectfully and not simply throw it away. Akko-chan is then given the gift of a magical mirror and taught enchantments, "tekumaku mayakon, tekumaku mayakon" and "lamipus lamipus lu lu lu lu lu". that will allow her to transform into anything she wishes.

== Characters ==
- Atsuko Kagami (鏡厚子, 加賀美あつ子, 加賀見アツコ, 加賀美あつこ, アッコちゃん)

Voiced by Yoshiko Ōta (1969), Mitsuko Horie (1988), Wakana Yamazaki (1998), Aya Hirano (2012)
Haruka Ayase (movie)
The titular protagonist. Atsuko Kagami is often called Akko-chan for short. 鏡アツ子, from the name 加賀美あつ子 but with the family-name part 加賀美, "Kagami" ("mirror"), replaced by 鏡.

- Kyoko Kagami (加賀美恭子)

Voiced by Reiko Senō (1969), Yoshiko Ōta (1988), Miina Tominaga (1998)
Akko's mother.

- Kenichiro Kagami (加賀美健一郎)

Voiced by Ichirō Murakoshi (1969), Banjō Ginga (1988), Ken Yamaguchi (1998)
Akko's father.

- Moko (モコ)

Voiced by Sumiko Shirakawa (1969), Kazuko Sugiyama (1988), Kikumi Umeda (1998)
Akko's best friend.

- Kankichi (カン吉)

Voiced by Akiko Tsuboi (1969), Noriko Uemura (1988), Harumi Ikoma (1998)
Moko's younger brother.

- Ganmo (ガンモ)

Voiced by Junko Hori, Mariko Takigawa (1969), Noriko Tsukase, Yuko Mita (1988), Junko Takeuchi (1998)
Kankichi's friend.

- Chikako (チカ子)

Voiced by Hiroko Maruyama (1969), Keiko Yamamoto (1988 and 1998)
A young girl who likes to spy on Akko.

- Taisho (大将, 赤塚大作)

Voiced by Hiroshi Ōtake (1969), Yoku Shioya (1988), Takuma Suzuki (1998)
A hefty boy and rival to Akko. He has a secret crush on her.

- Shosho (少将)

Voiced by Sachiko Chijimatsu (1969), Michiko Hirai (1969, episodes 56 and 61), Katsue Miwa (1988), Satomi Korogi (1998)
Taisho's younger brother.

- Gyoro (ギョロ)

Voiced by Junko Hori (1969), Michitaka Kobayashi (1988), Yoshihiko Akida (1998)
Henchman of Taisho.

- Goma (ゴマ)

Voiced by Kōko Kagawa, Junko Hori, Mariko Takigawa (1969), Noriko Tsukase, Chie Sato (1988), Yasuhiro Takato (1998)
Henchman of Taisho.

- Shippona (シッポナ)

Voiced by Sachiko Chijimatsu, Kōko Kagawa (1969), Naoko Watanabe (1988), Ai Nagano (1998)
Akko's cat.

- Dora (ドラ)

Voiced by Ichiro Murakoshi, Hiroshi Otake (1969), Masaharu Sato (1988), Yasuhiro Takato (1998)
Taisho's cat.

- Kenji Sato (佐藤健二, 佐藤先生)

Voiced by Osamu Ichikawa (1969), Masaharu Sato (1988), Hiroki Takahashi (1998)
Homeroom teacher of Akko and Moko.

- Moriyama (森山先生)

Voiced by Naoko Takahashi, Kōko Kagawa (1969), Kyoko Irokawa (1988), Ai Nagano (1998)
English teacher.

- Queen of the Mirror Country (ドラ)

Voiced by Reiko Senoo, Kōko Kagawa (1969), Eiko Masuyama (1988), Mitsuko Horie (1998)
A queen from the distant "Magic Country". She provides Akko with her compact mirror.

=== Exclusive to the 1969 anime ===
- Dark King

Voiced by Junpei Takiguchi
Taisho's Father

- Narrator

Voiced by Shun Yashiro

- Gabo (ガア坊)

Voiced by Shun Yashiro
A talking parrot.

- Kenta

Voiced by Hiroshi Fujioka
Kenta is good at Boxing and Rivalry for Taisho. He is angry & fighting at him & His henchman. He saves Akko & Kankichi.

=== Exclusive to the 1988 anime ===
- Kio (キーオ)

Voiced by Shigeru Nakahara
Prince of Mirror Country

- Gentaro (源太郎)

Voiced by Kazumi Tanaka
Elderly servant of Kio

- The Strange Old Man (変なおじさん)

Voiced by Kazumi Tanaka
A strange man who shows up randomly.

- Koji Hiroshima

Voiced by Toru Furuya
He is Leader of Mirror country

=== Exclusive to the 1998 anime ===
- Eiji Haraguchi

Voiced by Hikaru Midorikawa
Akko's Boyfriend and Taisho's Rival. He was angry at Taisho and Rescue to Akko.

- Kotaro Suzuki

Voiced by Kappei Yamaguchi
Eiji's Friend and Moko's Boyfriend.

- Mr.Suzuki

Voiced by Norio Wakamoto
Kotaro's Father.

- Mrs.Suzuki

Voiced by Minami Takayama
Kotaro's Mother.

- Hiroshi Haraguchi

Voiced by Takeshi Kusao
Eiji's Older Brother.

- Masato Yuki

Voiced by Toshiko Fujita
Eiji's Friend.

- Mimi Sakura

Voice by Reiko Chiba
Akko and Moko's Friend and Masato's Girlfriend.

- Ippei (一平)

Voiced by Junko Takeuchi
A penguin who joins Akko and friends.

=== Exclusive to the 2012 movie ===
- Naoto Hayase (早瀬尚人)

Voiced by Masaki Okada
