= Dorami-chan: Hello, Dynosis Kids!! =

1993 film by Keiichi Hara

- Theatrical release poster
- Kanji: ドラミちゃん ハロー恐竜キッズ!!
- Revised Hepburn: Dorami-chan Harō Kyōryū Kizzu!!
- Directed by: Keiichi Hara
- Screenplay by: Takashi Nishimura
- Based on: Doraemon by Fujiko F. Fujio
- Produced by: Sōichi Besshi; Sojiro Masuko; Yoshiaki Koizumi
- Starring: Keiko Yokozawa; Yoshiko Ōta; Kappei Yamaguchi; Toshiharu Sakurai; Ikue Ōtani; Issei Futamata
- Edited by: Hajime Okayasu; Toshihiko Kojima; Yumiko Nakaba; Hideaki Murai; Akihiro Kawasaki; Yoshiki Miyake
- Music by: Kohei Tanaka
- Production company: Shin-Ei Animation
- Distributed by: Toho
- Release date: March 6, 1993 (Japan)
- Running time: 40 minutes
- Country: Japan
- Language: Japanese
- Box office: $25.7 million

Dorami-chan: Hello, Dynosis Kids!! (ドラミちゃん ハロー恐竜キッズ!!, Dorami-chan Harō Kyōryū Kizzu!!), also known as Dorami-chan the Movie: Hello, Dynosis Kids!! (映画ドラミちゃんハロー恐竜キッズ!!, Eiga Dorami-chan Harō Kyōryū Kizzu!!) is a 1993 Japanese animated science fiction comedy-drama short film.

It premiered in Japan on March 6, 1993 on a triple feature with the Doraemon feature film Doraemon: Nobita and the Tin Labyrinth and short film The Sun Is Our Friend: Hold Out, the Soraemon!. It is the third Dorami-chan short film.

The film's tagline is "A time slip to the age of dinosaurs: a Doramiiatic adventure full of friendship and courage" (恐竜時代へタイム・スリップ 友情と勇気あふれるドラミチック・アドベンチャー).

== Plot ==
In the 22nd century, Sewashi attempts to collect birds' eggs outside a building, watched by Miekichi and Anton. He is attacked by the parents and slips off the edge, prompting Dorami to fly out and save him with her Takecopter. Sewashi uses his Anti-grav Belt to levitate before falling, and Dorami scolds him. Back inside the building again, Sewashi, Dorami, Miekichi, and Anton watch birds warm their eggs. Sewashi reminds Miekichi of a promise, but Miekichi recalls the promise differently, telling him it was if he was to bring back an egg. Dorami questions Sewashi's earlier actions, but Miekichi interrupts to mention birds are descended from dinosaurs, surprising Sewashi. When Sewashi asks for Anton's input, he admits he wasn't listening. Miekichi suggests that Sewashi check for himself, prompting Sewashi to propose a trip back to the dinosaurs. Dorami expresses concern about preparing the time machine, leading Sewashi to decide that he, Miekichi, and Anton will go without her.

Dorami, Sewashi, Miekichi, and Anton travel through time in Dorami's machine, arriving in the Cretaceous Period. Miekichi notes the absence of dinosaurs, and Sewashi mocks his fear. They discover a pink shield hiding a robotic building, which Dorami and Sewashi expose by pressing a button. Inside, they find dinosaur fossils, weapons, and a map indicating a 22nd-century dinosaur hunter's lair. Suddenly, a robot named Juranosin confronts them, demanding to know their identity and purpose. Juranosin drives Dorami, Anton, Sewashi, and Miekichi in his red vehicle. Anton expresses surprise at never hearing of a dinosaur conservationist, annoying Juranosin, who dislikes ignorance. He warns them of their surroundings and offers to return them home, but first stops to pick up some leftover litter. A herd of Triceratops end up appearing nearby and one of them approaches the group, much to the amazement of Dorami and the boys. Dorami ends up screaming at the sight of an ancient cockroach found by Juranosin due to her fear of cockroaches. Startled, Miekichi jumps into the driver's seat, causing the vehicle to drive off and leaving Juranosin behind. Sewashi and Miekichi argue about whether to continue traveling or return home after losing their way. Dorami uses an Assistant Rice Cakes gadget to make them cooperate, but they refuse until forced. Miekichi eats his Rice Cake, while Sewashi walks off with his. Sewashi later encounters an Ultrasaurus that eats his discarded Rice Cake and steps on their vehicle, prompting Miekichi to shout at it as it walks away. Sewashi, Dorami, Miekichi, and Anton end up walking across a dry area due to Dorami's Takecopter batteries having died. Anton is intrigued by the Moon's history going as far back as the time they are in, baffling Miekichi with his lack of dinosaur knowledge. They find a forest to camp for the night, prompting Miekichi to complain about walking more, which annoys Sewashi. Miekichi runs ahead and gets lost. Anton eventually finds him asleep in a small crater, and they all decide to sleep there due to its comfort.

The next morning, Miekichi wakes from a nightmare about falling into a crater and being eaten by a dinosaur. He realizes it was just a dream and Sewashi hands him a dinosaur egg from the crater. They discover it is a nest among other dinosaur nests, where Maiasaura are present. A Maiasaura places Miekichi back inside the nest when he tries to flee. Miekichi explains that Maiasaura are nurturing dinosaurs, akin to modern birds. Anton questions why there is only one egg, leading them to conclude other carnivorous dinosaurs took the rest. The Maiasaura returns with berries, indicating she considers them her young, and they eat the berries eagerly. Juranosin watches over Dorami, Sewashi, Miekichi, and Anton with the Maiasaura, noting their potential for trouble before stepping away. Miekichi sees Anton covering the hadrosaur's egg, which Anton explains is to thank the Maiasaura for the berries earlier. Although Miekichi warns the egg may take long to hatch, Anton reminds him that birds descended from dinosaurs, suggesting the wait might be shorter. Anton and Dorami decide to care for the egg, but Miekichi later suggests they return home, and they watch the sunset together.

Night falls as everyone sleeps in the nest. Sewashi awakens to find Anton turning in his sleep, leaving the Maiasaura egg unprotected. He holds the egg close, which Dorami wakes up to and ponders its impending hatching. She reaches the Hello Baby Torch gadget from her pocket but decides against using it, realizing not all problems require gadgets, and instead gently encourages Sewashi. As the following morning arrives, the Maiasaura egg begins to hatch, awakening the group. Sewashi, Anton, and Dorami celebrate while Miekichi smiles. Dorami suggests naming the baby, but Sewashi insists on a tough name. However, Anton has already chosen "Maisuke." Despite efforts to call it by other names, the baby responds happily to Anton's choice. Night falls, and Miekichi notes the unusual quiet in the Cretaceous Period. Dorami suggests a lack of carnivores nearby, assuring Miekichi that it's safe to sleep. However, a Lambeosaurus is attacked by a Tyrannosaurus overnight.

The next morning, Anton cares for Maisuke while Dorami feels Maisuke only cares for him. Suddenly, a trio of Stenonychosaurus attack the Maiasaura nests, with one attempting to eat Maisuke until Dorami shrinks it with a gadget, turning it into a small toy for Maisuke.

As Maisuke grows, he learns to walk, and plays with Anton. When his mother pushes him from the nest, he fears and jumps into Anton's arms. Anton, with the group's support, reassures Maisuke, and together they successfully explore the outside world, with Anton carrying him on his back. The group travels through the forest, eating berries, and discovers a lake with an island. Maisuke successfully runs to the island, but Dorami and the boys sink while trying to follow. They eventually reach the island and lie down together. The Tyrannosaurus chases them into the water. The mother Maiasaura attacks but gets bitten. Sewashi urges Dorami to act, prompting her to use a Remote Hologram gadget to create a holographic Tyrannosaurus that distracts the real one while she, Sewashi, Maisuke, Miekichi, and Anton assist the injured Maiasaura. At night, Dorami uses the Treatment Lamp on the injured Maiasaura as Anton reassures Maisuke, with the Tyrannosaurus seeking revenge.

The next day, the mother Maiasaura is eating berries again, indicating recovery. Anton and Miekichi note Maisuke's growth and the need for migration due to increased food requirements and competition. Dorami realizes food will become scarce. Anton asks Maisuke about going solo, prompting Dorami to feel they may have spent too much time together. After rainfall, Dorami and the boys spot the Maiasaura group migrating and wish Maisuke well. Maisuke invites Anton to join him and his mother for migration but sadly parts ways. As they depart, the same Tyrannosaurus attacks, and Maisuke's mother trips. Maisuke tries to defend her but fails. Dorami distracts the Tyrannosaurus with a scent spray and uses special shoes to escape with the boys. They hide, allowing Maisuke and his mother to migrate. The Tyrannosaurus breaks through their hiding spot, injuring Dorami. The same Ultrasaurus from earlier intervenes, battling the Tyrannosaurus to save Miekichi until an earthquake causes the latter to fall. The boys cheer, but the Ultrasaurus then falls as well, leaving Sewashi feeling guilty. They notice darkening skies and rush back to save Maisuke.

A volcano erupts, prompting Anton to save Maisuke. Miekichi trips, and Sewashi helps him just as a meteorite approaches. Juranosin arrives in a futuristic ship, rescuing the group before they can be harmed. Anton cries for Maisuke before leaving the Cretaceous Period. As Juranosin drives through time, he bluntly tells them that the dinosaurs will inevitably die, with Anton wishing it weren't so. Juranosin reveals that Maisuke made a new home, showing them through the Time TV that the eggs Sewashi tried to grab that hatched are Maisuke's distant relatives. In the 22nd century, Dorami hopes the newly hatched birds grow up to be strong like Maisuke.

== Cast ==
Character	Japanese voice actor
Dorami	Keiko Yokozawa
Sewashi	Yoshiko Ōta
Miekichi	Kappei Yamaguchi
Anton	Toshiharu Sakurai
Maisuke	Ikue Ōtani
Juranosin	Issei Futamata

== Production ==
In 1993, the same year Dorami-chan: Hello Dynosis Kids!! was released, a huge dinosaur boom was happening in both Japan and the United States with many films featuring baby dinosaurs being released, the short film counted as one of them.

== Soundtrack ==
=== Theme song ===
"Hello! Dorami-chan" (ハロー!ドラミちゃん)
Lyrics: Yumi Yoshimoto / Composition and Arrangement: Shunsuke Kikuchi / Vocals: Satoko Yamano

== Release ==
The short film was released theatrically in Japan on a triple feature with Doraemon: Nobita and the Tin Labyrinth and The Sun Is Our Friend: Hold Out, the Soraemon! on March 6, 1993.

To commemorate the 45th anniversary of the Doraemon movie series and the release of Doraemon: Nobita's Art World Tales, the short was screened as a part of the "45th Anniversary of the Doraemon Movie: Doraemon Film Festival 2025" special screening event held at the Jinbōchō Theater from February 1 to March 6, 2025.

=== Television broadcasts ===
In 2011, to commemorate the theatrical release of Doraemon: Nobita and the New Steel Troops ~Winged Angels~, a 24 hour marathon of Doraemon short films and specials including Hello, Dynosis Kids!! and the original Doraemon: Nobita and the Steel Troops aired on TV Asahi's CS TV Asahi Channel starting February 26.

=== Home media ===
The short film released on DVD with the Chimpui short film Chinpui: Eri-sama Katsudō Daishashin.

=== Streaming ===
In 2024, for the occasion of the 90th anniversary of Fujiko F. Fujio, remastered versions of Dorami-chan: Hello Dynosis Kids!! alongside numerous animated short films of Doraemon, Perman, Esper Mami, and Chimpui were made available to stream on Prime Video in Japan as the "Fujiko F. Fujio's 90th Anniversary Film Masterpiece Selection".

== See also ==
- List of films featuring dinosaurs
- List of Doraemon films
