= Shingo Kanemoto =

Japanese actor and voice actor (1932–1991)

Shingo Kanemoto (兼本 新吾, Kanemoto Shingo; October 12, 1932 – February 24, 1991) was a Japanese actor and voice actor originally from Fukuoka Prefecture. On February 24, 1991, he died of intra-axial hematoma at the age of 58. After his death, his ongoing roles went to Takeshi Watabe.

== Filmography ==
- Space Battleship Yamato III (Gorō Raiden)
- Esper Mami (Aoyama-sensei)
- Kaibutsu-kun (Wolfman, Franken)
- Gatchaman (Ryu the Horned Owl)
- Kyojin no Hoshi (Hosaku Samon)
- GeGeGe no Kitaro 1971 (Merman, Kasa-obake)
- Fist of the North Star (Kemada)
- Zenderman (Saigo-san)
- Andersen Stories (Bad Priest)
- Tiger Mask (Giant Baba)
- Fang of the Sun Dougram (Dick Lertoff)
- Astro Boy (Inspector Tawashi)
- Dokaben (Takezo Inukai)
- Obake no Q-tarō (Kaminari, Papa's boss)
- Doraemon (Kaminari (First Voice))
- Norakuro (Deka)
- Maison Ikkoku (Yagami's Father)
- Lupin III 1st Series (Gordan)
- Police Academy: The Animated Series (Professor and Mauser)
- Mobile Suit Gundam Movie II (Kozun Graham)
- Robotto Keiji (Kaminariman, Taihoman)
- The☆Ultraman (Kei Marume)
