= Harumi Naitō =

Japanese singer (born 1955)

- 内藤 はるみ
- Born: Harumi Naitō; July 26, 1955 (age 71); Gifu City, Gifu Prefecture, Japan
- Other names: Ai Asatsuki (朝月 愛); Harumi Komiyama (小見山はるみ)
- Occupation: Singer
- Years active: 1960s–present
- Known for: Theme song vocals for Doraemon
- Label: Nippon Columbia

Harumi Naitō (内藤 はるみ, Naitō Harumi) (born July 26, 1955) also known professionally as Ai Asatsuki (朝月 愛, Asatsuki Ai) and Harumi Komiyama (小見山はるみ, Komiyama Harumi) is a Japanese singer from Gifu City, Gifu Prefecture, Japan. She graduated from Horikoshi High School.

She is best known for performing the opening theme song "Doraemon" and the ending theme song "Doraemon Rumba" for the Doraemon anime series.

== Biography ==
=== Early life ===
Naitō was born in Gifu City, Gifu Prefecture, Japan on July 26, 1955.

Starting when she was two years old, Naitō would often imitate Hibari Misora at events like neighborhood gatherings. According to Naitō herself, she had already been a die-hard music lover since around that time.

=== Career ===
In 1967, during her sixth grade school year, she competed in the Nissin Children's Amateur Singing Contest and won, causing Nippon Columbia to scout her.

After making her debut on the show, Naitō then performed as a child singer alongside Mitsuko Horie, Kumiko Kaori, and Yuri Shimazaki, providing backing vocals and releasing several singles as part of their "little ones" series of songs.

Once Naitō had graduated from middle school, she moved to Tokyo with her mother in order to start attending Horikoshi High School.

In 1973, Naitō sang both the opening theme and ending theme songs for the Doraemon anime series that aired on Nippon Television.

Once Naitō finished high school, she decided to pursue an adult-oriented singing career, so changed her name to Ai Asatsuki and performed "Woman of the Wind", the theme song for the 1975 television drama Shadow Doshin. In an interview from the time, she commented on recording the song, saying, "Since this isn't a children's song, I had a hard time setting the right mood. I also sang each line with my own personal emotion." Naitō mentioned in the same interview that, regarding future plans, since she felt the style of enka singing suited her, she would start focusing on performing it.

=== Current activity ===
In 2020, Naitō appeared as the owner of a café in an episode of the NHK General TV program Tsurube's Salute To Families that was broadcast on February 10. During her appearance on the show, she sang a portion of the Doraemon opening theme song, "Doraemon", on cappella.

In 2022, Naitō formed the duo "chum" with a childhood friend of hers and has resumed her career in singing.

In 2026, Naitō started going by the name Harumi Komiyama.

== Discography ==
=== Harumi Naitō ===
- "Doraemon" / "Doraemon Rumba" (Theme Song for the TV Anime "Doraemon")
- In a City Bathed in Light / Embraced by Sorrow (Theme Song for the CBC Daytime Drama Series "A Mother's Song")

"Little Clumsy Kids" series

- Little Alien
- Sunset Jizo

"Kids' Pop" series

- The Young Sun

"Junior Pops" series

- Pure Love All the Way / Blooming Maidens

=== Ai Asatsuki ===
- "Woman of the Wind" (Theme Song for the TV Drama "Shadow Doshin") / "A Woman's Uphill Struggle" (Insert Song for the TV Drama "Shadow Doshin") (May 1975, Nippon Columbia, AA-121)
- "Kyoto Namida-cho" / "I'm Leaving on Tonight's Train" (Nippon Columbia, AA-156)
