= Parasol Henbē =

Japanese media franchise

- First tankōbon volume cover

パラソルヘンべえ (Parasoru Henbē)
- Manga
- Written by: Fujiko Fujio A
- Published by: Kodansha
- Imprint: BomBom KC
- Magazine: Hero Magazine
- Original run: October 1989 – January 1991
- Volumes: 2
- Anime television series
- Directed by: Masakazu Higuchi
- Written by: Satoru Akahori
- Studio: Studio C&D
- Original network: NHK General TV
- Original run: October 2, 1989 – January 12, 1991
- Episodes: 200
- Video game
- Developer: Sakata SAS
- Publisher: Epoch Co.
- Genre: Action
- Platform: Game Boy
- Released: November 16, 1990
- Video game
- Developer: Sakata SAS
- Publisher: Epoch Co.
- Genre: Platform
- Platform: Family Computer
- Released: February 15, 1991

Parasol Henbē (Japanese: パラソルヘンべえ, Hepburn: Parasoru Henbē) is a Japanese multimedia franchise created by Fujiko Fujio A (the pen name for Motoo Abiko). A manga series was published in Kodansha's Hero Magazine from the October 1989 to the January 1991 issues, with its chapters collected in two tankōbon volumes. A 200-episode anime television series, produced by Studio C&D, was broadcast on NHK from October 2, 1989, to January 12, 1991.

== Synopsis ==
While playing in his world Henbē falls down a tunnel in a waterfall and wakes up in the human world inside the closet of a kid named Megeru. The tunnel closes, preventing him from returning to his home world. Henbē possesses a magical parasol and with it he can fly and do magic, he also can speak to animals and fulfill everyone's dreams.

Soon Henbē and Megeru become friends, and Henbē gets to help him out while staying at Megeru's house. Occasionally the tunnel back to his home world opens and animals and friends from his home world come through. Later when Henbē gets the chance to return to his home world, he hesitates due to his friendship with Maruko. Later in the series, Henbē and Megeru travel to his home world with Henbē's magical Parasol.

== Characters ==
Henbee
Voiced by: Meiko Nakamura
A mysterious small talking pink hippopotamus-like creature. He has a magical parasol and with it he can fly and do magic, he also can speak to animals and fulfill everyone's dreams.
Maruko
Voiced by: Junko Hori
Megeru
Voiced by: Noriko Hidaka
Abuko
Voiced by: Rei Sakuma
Izumi
Voiced by: Rei Sakuma
Memosuke
Voiced by: Ryusei Nakao
Gorita
Voiced by: Tesshō Genda
