= Hiwou War Chronicles =

Japanese anime television series

- Promotional art by Bones

機巧奇傳 ヒヲウ戦記 (Karakuri Kiden Hiwō Senki)
- Genre: Mecha, Adventure
- Created by: Bones; Shō Aikawa
- Manga
- Written by: Shō Aikawa
- Illustrated by: Ichi Jinguuji
- Published by: Kodansha
- Magazine: Magazine Z
- Original run: 1999 – 2001
- Volumes: 4
- Anime television series
- Directed by: Tetsurō Amino
- Produced by: Katsuhiko Gotō; Mitsuyuki Yokohama; Michiru Ōshima; Shirō Sasaki; Korefumi Seki; Masahiko Minami
- Written by: Akihiko Inari; Fuyunori Gobu; Naruhisa Arakawa; Shō Aikawa (screenwriter); Yutaka Nada
- Music by: Hiroshi Yamaguchi
- Studio: Bones
- Licensed by: Crunchyroll (streaming); NA: Bandai Entertainment
- Original network: NHK BS-2
- English network: SEA: Animax Asia
- Original run: October 24, 2000 – May 1, 2001
- Episodes: 26

Hiwou War Chronicles (Japanese: 機巧奇傳ヒヲウ戦記, Hepburn: Karakuri Kiden Hiwō Senki; lit. "Karakuri Amazing Legend Hiwou War Chronicles") is a Japanese anime television series, and the first to be produced by Bones. The series was first aired on NHK BS-2 and ran for twenty six episodes, from October 24, 2000, until May 1, 2001. Created by Shō Aikawa and directed by Tetsurō Amino, the series' character designer and chief animation director was the late Hiroshi Ōsaka.

The series was subsequently aired by the anime television network Animax, who also aired it across its English language networks in Southeast Asia and South Asia. For the 25th anniversary of the studio, it was made available worldwide (excluding Japan) on Crunchyroll on March 17, 2025.

== Story ==
The series is set within the Meiji period of Japan, following a small boy named Hiwou. The townspeople have lived simply, making "Clockwork Dolls" or "karakuri" for festivals. Hiwou's father left the family on a long trip, and their mother has since died. The children live with friends.

Their simple life vanishes when the "Wind Gang" appears, destroys the city with their own clockwork dolls, and captures its citizens. Hiwō and his siblings and friends, Shishi, Machi, Tetsu, Mayu, Sai, and baby Jyobu (who are exploring a cave at the time), escape unharmed and embark on a quest to save the town. They take with them Homura, a huge clockwork doll that functions like a giant robot.

Along the way, they are forced to use their clockwork dolls as weapons - something they were never supposed to do, according to Hiwō's father. Early in the series, they meet Arashi, a member of the Wind Gang, and Hana and Yuki, two samurai daughters who ended up traveling with the group.

Hiwō and his friends encounter a number of historical figures, before these people entered the history books during the Meiji Restoration.

== Production ==
=== Staff ===
- Director: Tetsuro Amino
- Music: Hiroshi Yamaguchi
- Original creator: Shō Aikawa
- Character Design: Hajime Jinguji, Hiroshi Osaka
- Art director: Nobuto Sakamoto
- Mecha design: Junya Ishigaki
- Director of Photography: Youichi Ōgami
- Color Coordination: Kenji Chiba
- Historical Verification: Tetsunori Iwashita
- Main Animation Director: Hiroshi Osaka
- Sound director: Yasuo Uragami
- Animation Production: BONES

=== Cast ===
- Houko Kuwashima as Hiwō
- Kaori Mizuhashi as Machi
- Rikako Aikawa as Shishi
- Akiko Yajima as Mayu
- Haruna Ikezawa as Hana
- Omi Minami as Yuki
- Kazuhiko Inoue as Ryōma Sakamoto
- Nobuo Tobita as Sai
- Shin-ichiro Miki as Arashi
- Yoko Teppouzuka as Tetsu
- Yūko Mizutani as Alexander
- Yūji Takada as Aka
- Masako Ebisu as the Narrator
- Chisato Nakajima as Child (Ep. 2)
- Yukimasa Kishino as Gennosuke (Ep. 6)

== Music ==
=== Opening theme ===
Hiwou no Theme(ヒヲウのテーマ) by Hiroshi Yamaguchi

=== Ending theme ===
CROSSROAD by Kumiko Endō
