= Junko Hori =

Japanese actress and voice actress (1935–2024)

- 堀 絢子
- Born: February 2, 1935; Mukden, Liaoning, Manchukuo (now Shenyang, China)
- Died: November 18, 2024 (aged 89)
- Education: Aoyama Gakuin University
- Occupations: Actress; voice actress
- Years active: 1960–2024
- Employer: Production Baobab

Junko Hori (堀 絢子, Hori Junko; February 2, 1935 – November 18, 2024) was a Japanese actress who specialized in voice acting. She was represented by Production Baobab.

Hori is best known as the voice of the main protagonists in three Fujiko Fujio works, Obake no Q-Tarō, Ninja Hattori-kun, and Chimpui. As a dubbing artist she is known for the roles of Jerry from 1969 to 1970 in Tom and Jerry and Bart Simpson in The Simpsons.

== Death ==
Hori died on November 18, 2024, at the age of 89. Her death was announced over a week later. Prior to her death, she was planning on continuing to perform her one-woman play with the 292nd performance, scheduled for November 22 that year in Ryōgoku, Sumida, Tokyo but died while rehearsing.

== Filmography ==
=== Television animation ===
List of voice performances in television animation
Year	Title	Role	Notes	Source
1965	Wolf Boy Ken	Additional voice		
1966	Osomatsu-kun	Additional voice		
1966	Astro Boy	Additional voice		
1967	The Golden Bat	Mutant		
1967	Perman	Mie Haru san		
1967	Speed Racer	Kurio Mifune (Spritle)		
1967	Princess Knight	Chibi		
1967	Rainbow Sentai Robin	Purēbo		
1968	The Monster Kid	Kizao, Bem, Poppo Watering Can, Little Snow Boy	First voice of Bem	
1968	Star of the Giants	Saburo Samon		
1968	Cyborg 009	Additional voice		
1968	Sabu to Ichi Torimono Hikae	Sensho	Ep. 3	
1968	Wanpaku Tanteidan	Chibi-chan		
1969	Plum Star Prince	Additional voice		
1969	Ninpu Kamui Gaiden	Bamboo		
1969	The Secret of Akko-chan	Ganmo Unohana, Goma	First voice of Ganmo Unohana, Second voice of Goma	
1969	Moomin	Little My		
1969	Mōretsu Atarō	Totoko, Kankichi		
1970	Otoko Doaho Koshien	Kyuzo Fujimura		
1971	Andersen Stories	Witch	Eps 7–10	
1971	Hyppo and Thomas	Thomas	Second voice	
1971	New Little Ghost Q-tarō	Q-tarō	Lead role	
1971	Chingou Muchabee	Additional voice		
1971	Tensai Bakabon	Additional voice		
1971	Marvelous Melmo	Naname	First voice; Ep. 5	
1972	Kunimatsu-sama no O-toori-dai	Matsukichi		
1972	New Moomin	Little My		
1972	Sarutobi Ecchan	Additional voice		
1973	Karate Master	Additional voice		
1973	Jungle Kurobe	Okara, Gack	First voice of Gack	
1973	The Gutsy Frog	Additional voice		
1973	Doraemon	Gachako	Main role	
1973	Little Wansa	Gonbe		
1974	New Honeybee Hutch	Tenten		
1975	Arabian Nights: Sinbad's Adventures	Tabasa		
1975	Gamba's Adventure	Ikasama		
1975	Maya the Honey Bee	Old-Woman Grasshopper, Harold		
1976	Paul's Miraculous Adventure	Baby Mynah Bird		
1976	Ghost Story: Cat Eyed Boy	Cat-Eyed Boy	Lead role	
1976	Little Lulu and Her Little Friends	Annie		
1977	Super Electromagnetic Machine Voltes V	Tacco		
1978	Her Majesty's Petite Angie	Chandra		
1978	Pink Lady Monogatari: Eikou no Tenshi-tachi	Keiko Masuda/Kei		
1978	Lupin the Third Part II	Kikugorō Bentenkozō	Eps 55–56	
1979	Anne of Green Gables	Josie Pye		
1980	Tomorrow's Joe 2	Kinoko		
1981	The Monster Kid	Old Crow the Maid		
1981	The Gutsy Frog 2	Gorō		
1981	Astro Boy	Pinoco	Ep. 27	
1981	Ninja Hattori-kun	Kanzō Hattori	Lead role	
1982	Hello! Spank	Additional voice		
1982	Game Center Arashi	Tongarashi Ishino		
1982	Mysterious Cities of Gold	Tao		
1982	Boku Patalliro!	a Random, Additional voice		
1983	A Time Slip of 10000 Years: Prime Rose	Bunretsu Tanbara	Television special	
1984	Little Memole	Michelle	episode 34	
1987	City Hunter	Senjuuin	Ep. 18	
1988	Ultra B	Kanzō Hattori		
1989	Oishinbo	Tamayo Kurita		
1989	Chimpui	Chimpui	Lead role	
1989	Parasol Henbē	Maruko		
1989	Biriken Nandemo Shōkai	Granny	Ep. 10	
1991	Let's Go! Anpanman	Pickled Plum Granny	first voice	
1992	Mama wa Shōgaku 4 Nensei	Ogin		
1995	Mobile Suit Gundam Wing	Long Shirin		
1996	Gambalist! Shun	Tadokoro's grandma		
1997	Doraemon	Suneo's great-grandmother		
1998	Crayon Shin-chan	Cherry Blossom Child		
1999	Gokudo the Adventurer	Fortune-Telling Granny		
1999	Shūkan Storyland	Mysterious Old Woman		
1999	Great Detective Conan	Souda Mitsue, Masayo Sudo, Misae Yamamura, Izumi Suda	Masayo Sudo in Ep. 393, Misae Yamamura in Eps 545–546, Izumi Suda in Eps 757–758	
2001	The Legend of Condor Hero	Granny Sun		
2002	Tokyo Mew Mew	Mint's nurse		
2003	Cinderella Boy	Dorothy Ozu		
2003	Rumic Theater	Hiroshi Kakei	Ep. 1	
2003	Mermaid Saga	Village Elder		
2006	Yakeato no, Okashi no Ki	Taichi's grandmother	Television special	
2007	Atashin'chi	Old Turtle Lady		
2007	Emily, The Wind Girl	Tom's aunt		
2007	Deltora Quest	Apple Park Old Lady	Ep. 21	
2007	Skull Man	Akira's mother	Ep. 5	
2012	Doraemon	Hikaru Koshida	Ep. 463	
2013	Chōsoku Henkei Gyrozetter	Old Woman at Sales Counter		
2014	HappinessCharge Pretty Cure!	Nobuko Mitsuya	Ep. 35	
2016	Gan Gan Ganko-chan	Piro		

=== Theatrical animation ===
List of voice performances in theatrical animation
Year	Title	Role	Notes	Source
1962	Otogi's Voyage Around the World	Additional voice		
1963	Doggie March	Rock (young), Lighthouse Girl	Lead role	
1965	Gulliver's Travels Beyond the Moon	Mack the Stray Dog		
1966	Jungle Emperor	Additional voice		
1968	Hols: Prince of the Sun	Potomu/Potom, Freppu/Flip		
1980	Makoto-chan	Monta		
1981	Tomorrow's Joe 2	Additional voice		
1981	The Fantastic Adventures of Unico	Akuma-kun/Mr. Demon/Beezle	Main role	
1982	New Gutsy Frog: The Gutsy Pillow	Gorō		
1982	Ninja Hattori-kun: Abracadabra Magic Picture Diary	Kanzō Hattori	Lead role; short film	
1983	Ninja Hattori-kun: Abracadabra Hometown Battle Diary	Kanzō Hattori	Lead role	
1984	Ninja Hattori-kun + Perman: Psychic Wars	Kanzō Hattori	Lead role	
1984	Boukenshatachi: Gamba to 7-biki no Naka Ma	Ikasama		
1985	Night on the Galactic Railroad	Zanelli		
1985	Ninja Hattori-kun + Perman: Ninja Beast Jippō vs. Miracle Egg	Kanzō Hattori	Lead role	
1986	Super Mario Bros.: The Great Mission to Rescue Princess Peach!	Miss Endless, Lakitu		
1987	I'll Give Them All Away	Mamiya Chiyo		
1990	Chimpui: Eri-sama's Active Great Photograph	Chimpui	Lead role	
1990	Hello Kitty's Thumbelina	Additional voice		
1991	The Adventure of Gamba and the Otters	Ikasama		
1993	Sanpei the Kappa	Gataro		

=== Video games ===
- Ganbare Goemon (xxxx) (Sasuke)
- GeGeGe no Kitaro (2003) (Sunakake Babaa)

=== Live action ===
- Kaiju Booska (xxxx) (Chamegon (voice))
- Ganbare!! Robocon (xxxx) (Robomero (voice))

=== Dubbing ===
==== Live-action ====
- Child's Play (Good Guy Doll (Edan Gross))
- Diff'rent Strokes (Arnold (Gary Coleman))
- Doubt (Sister Veronica (Alice Drummond))
- Everybody Loves Raymond (Marie Barone (Doris Roberts))
- Friday the 13th: A New Beginning (Reggie (Shavar Ross))
- Supercar (Jimmy Gibson)

==== Animation ====
- Codename: Kids Next Door (Leona)
- The Incredibles (Mrs. Hogenson)
- Jonny Quest (1965) (Jonny Quest)
- Little Lulu (Annie)
- The Simpsons (Bart Simpson)
- Tom and Jerry (Jerry)
- Woody Woodpecker (DVD editions) (Woody Woodpecker)

== Awards ==
Year	Award	Category	Result
2017	11th Seiyu Awards	Merit Award	Won
