= Big X =

Japanese manga series

- Cover of Big X volume 1 from the Osamu Tezuka Manga Complete Works edition

ビッグX (Biggu X)
- Genre: Action
- Manga
- Written by: Osamu Tezuka
- Published by: Shueisha
- Magazine: Shōnen Book
- Original run: November 1963 – February 1966
- Volumes: 4
- Anime television series
- Directed by: Mitsutero Okamoto; Osamu Dezaki
- Produced by: Saburō Gōda; Yutaka Fujioka
- Written by: Jirō Tsunoda; Moribi Murano; Tadashi Hirose
- Music by: Isao Tomita
- Studio: Tokyo Movie
- Original network: TBS
- Original run: 3 August 1964 – 27 September 1965
- Episodes: 59

Big X (ビッグX, Biggu Ekkusu) is a science fiction manga series and an anime series by Osamu Tezuka, about German Nazis trying to create secret weapons toward the end of World War II. The anime, which was Tokyo Movie's first work, is considered lost, with only episodes 1, 11–12, 14, and 40-59 known to survive.

== Plot ==
Invited to Nazi Germany during World War II, Dr. Asagumo is asked by Hitler to collaborate in researching the new weapon "Big X". Concerned about the possible effects of this weapon, Dr. Asagumo intentionally delays the progress of the research, conspiring with his co-researcher, the devious Dr. Engel. Immediately before Germany is defeated by the Allies, Dr. Asagumo is shot to death by the German army but not before implanting a card inscribed with the secret of Big X into his son, Shigeru. An organization claiming alliance with the Nazis appears, steals the card from Shigeru, who now lives in Tokyo, and completes the Big X project, which is revealed to be a drug that can expand the human body without limitation. Dr. Engel's grandson has joined the Nazi Alliance. Recovering Big X from the enemy, Shigeru's son Akira fearlessly challenges the Nazi Alliance and Hans Engel, who are plotting to conquer the world.

== Voice cast ==
- Akira Shimada as Big X
- Fuyumi Shiraishi as Nina
- Ichirô Nagai as Dr. Hanamaru
- Keiko Yamamoto as Hans Engel
- Yoshiko Ōta as Akira Asagumo

== Other appearances ==
- Big X makes a cameo appearance in the Astro Boy: Omega Factor game for the Nintendo Game Boy Advance released in 2004, along with many other characters also created by Osamu Tezuka.
- In the Oh My Goddess! manga, Urd watches a thinly veiled parody of the show.
- In the film Dragon Ball Super: Super Hero the characters Gamma 1 and Gamma 2 wear a suit similar to Big X.

== Availability in English ==
While there is no physical format of either the Big X manga or anime in English, TMS uploaded a subbed episode 1 to its YouTube channel, in honor of the studio's 60th anniversary.

== Reception ==
Manga artist Katsuhiro Otomo considered it to be among his favorite Tezuka manga.

== See also ==
- List of Osamu Tezuka anime
- List of Osamu Tezuka manga
- Nazi exploitation
- Osamu Tezuka's Star System
