= Doraemon (1973 TV series) =

1973 Japanese anime television series

- The opening title of the series
- Genre: Science fiction comedy
- Based on: Doraemon by Fujiko Fujio
- Written by: Haruya Yamazaki; Ryosuke Suzuki; Satoshi Inoue; Kozo Yoshihara; Mitsuru Mashima
- Directed by: Kazuyuki Okasako; Shigeo Koshi
- Voices of: Kōsei Tomita; Masako Nozawa; Yoshiko Ōta; Masako Ebisu; Shun Yashiro; Kaneta Kimotsuki
- Music by: Nobuyoshi Koshibe
- Opening theme: "Doraemon" by Harumi Naitō
- Ending theme: "Doraemon Rumba" by Harumi Naitō
- Country of origin: Japan
- Original language: Japanese
- No. of episodes: 26 (list of episodes)

Production
- Production company: Nippon TeleMovie Productions

Original release
- Network: NNS (NTV)
- Release: April 1 – September 30, 1973

Related
- 1979 anime; 2005 anime

Doraemon (ドラえもん, Doraemon) is a Japanese anime television series based on Fujiko F. Fujio's manga of the same name and is the first adaptation in the media franchise. The series, produced by Nippon TeleMovie Productions, originally aired in Japan on NNS from April 1 to September 30, 1973.

== Premise ==
Doraemon follows the title character, a cat-like robot, who travels from the future to take care of a young child named Nobita and guide him on the right path for his future.

== Cast and characters ==
Doraemon, Suneo, Nobita, Shizuka, and Gian (and Tamako) as seen in the 1973 series

The voice cast was chosen in cooperation with Aoni Production and Theater Echo.

- Kōsei Tomita (episodes 1–13), Masako Nozawa (episodes 14–26) as Doraemon
- Yoshiko Ōta as Nobita Nobi
- Masako Ebisu as Shizuka Minamoto
- Shun Yashiro as Suneo Honekawa
- Kaneta Kimotsuki as Takeshi "Gian" Gōda
- Noriko Ohara as Tamako Nobi
- Ichirō Murakoshi as Nobisuke Nobi
- Toshiya Ueda, Kazue Takahashi as Mrs. Honekawa
- Osamu Katō, Sanji Hase as Mr. Honekawa
- Masashi Amenomori, Osamu Katō, as Mr. Ganari (Teacher)
- Keiko Yamamoto as Sewashi
- Masako Nozawa, unknown as Botako
- Junko Hori as Gachako
- Noriko Tsukase as Debuko
- Rihoko Yoshida as Jamako

== Production and broadcast ==
=== Development ===
The origins of the first adaptation of Doraemon are thought to have been planned by Masami Niikura, then-president of Nippon Television. Hiroshi Igawa, the editor-in-chief of the manga Shogaku Ninensei, was approached by a producer from Nippon Television Network, who suggested manga such as Mother Star and Doraemon, the latter of which was subsequently picked.

=== Broadcast ===
The series was originally broadcast between April 1 to September 30, 1973, on Nippon Television. 26 episodes, divided into 52 individual segments, were produced. A pilot film was produced in 1972 and shown to test audiences in January 1973. The audience included Doraemon creators Fujiko Fujio. They initially approved of the show, but when they were shown the progress, were apparently angered by the fact that they changed Nobita and Doraemon's personalities.

Many episodes produced were either TV-exclusive episodes and were subsequently never remade, or manga chapters which haven't been readapted for the later anime series.

The show was frequently rebroadcast throughout the 1970s. The station, Toyama Television, was the last to air the show, airing from July 3 to July 24, 1981, and briefly again in August of that year. The station aired the show in individual segments. On August 3, the publisher of the Doraemon manga requested the station to cease airing the show, to make sure the reputation of the more famous and longer-running 1979 series wasn't harmed, as well as to not confuse children watching between both versions. The animation crew of the show, Nippon TeleMovie Productions, went bankrupt in 1981. Before they went defunct, they attempted to cover the debt by selling off the masters of the 1973 series, the Japanese post-production company IMAGICA, discovered episodes 18 and 20 through 26 in their archive, as well as segments 5A, 10B and 12B.

In 2003, the production chief of the show, Hiroshi Shimozaki, now going under the name Masami Jun or "mcsammy", came forward with several episodes and rush reels (raw footage). He later uploaded low-quality versions of the intro and credits to his site on a members-only and password-protected page, however, a few minutes after the upload, he was told that the intro and credits were uploaded to Japanese anonymous board site 2channel. He immediately removed the video files from his site, but it was already too late. Many images of his episodes were uploaded to GeoCities. In the late 1990s, a person came forward with a VHS recording of the episode "Crazy Stomach Clock", dated from 1978. Audio clips from the episode were uploaded, but the site they were hosted on was removed. In 2015, a YouTube user discovered a clip playing on a television set in a Japanese pornographic film from the 1970s.

No episodes are known to exist online or on home media, besides an audio recording of the final episode. The only footage currently available is Jun's uploads of the show's opening and ending, however the footage is of very low quality (240p 193 kbit/s video, 128 kbit/s audio). Other footage currently available from this series are the aforementioned clip from said pornographic film above as well as the preview for episode 3.

== Episodes ==
No.	Title	Original release date
1	"Doraemon Came Out!!"; Transliteration: "Deta!! Doraemon no Maki" (Japanese: 出た！！ドラえもんの巻)	April 1, 1973
1	"The Bow-Bow Grasshopper Riot"; Transliteration: "Pekopekobatta Ōsōdō no Maki" (Japanese: ペコペコバッタ大騒動の巻)	April 1, 1973
2	"Nice Girl on the Roof"; Transliteration: "Yane no Ue no Sutekina Ko no Maki" (Japanese: 屋根の上のすてきな子の巻)	April 8, 1973
2	"Nobita's Ancestors"; Transliteration: "Nobita no Gosenzo-san no Maki" (Japanese: のび太のご先祖さんの巻)	April 8, 1973
3	"Understand the Weakness"; Transliteration: "Yowami wo Nigire no Maki" (Japanese: 弱味をにぎれの巻)	April 15, 1973
3	"Operation Cupid Love-Love"; Transliteration: "Kyūpiddo de Suki-Suki Sakusen no Maki" (Japanese: キューピッドですきすき作戦の巻)	April 15, 1973
4	"There is a Cat Weak Against Mice"; Transliteration: "Nezumi ni Yowai Neko mo Aru no Maki" (Japanese: ねずみに弱い猫もあるの巻)	April 22, 1973
4	"Defeat the Bully"; Transliteration: "Gakitaishō wo Yattsukero no Maki" (Japanese: ガキ大将をやっつけろの巻)	April 22, 1973
5	"The Flattery Mirror"; Transliteration: "Oseji Kagami no Maki" (Japanese: おせじ鏡の巻)	April 29, 1973
5	"Dad and Mom's Wedding Anniversary"; Transliteration: "Papa to Mama no Kekkon Kinenbi no Maki" (Japanese: パパとママの結婚記念日の巻)	April 29, 1973
6	"Cursed Camera"; Transliteration: "Noroi Kamera no Maki" (Japanese: のろいカメラの巻)	May 6, 1973
6	"Lottery Jackpot Strategy"; Transliteration: "Takarakuji Ōatari Sakusen no Maki" (Japanese: 宝くじ大当り作戦の巻)	May 6, 1973
7	"Nobita and Gian Duel it Out!"; Transliteration: "Kettō! Nobita to Jaian no Maki" (Japanese: 決闘！のび太とジャイアンの巻)	May 13, 1973
7	"Who am I?"; Transliteration: "Watashi wa Daredeshō no Maki" (Japanese: わたしは誰でしょうの巻)	May 13, 1973
8	"Abekonbe Riot"; Transliteration: "Abekonbe Sōdō no Maki" (Japanese: アベコンベ騒動の巻)	May 20, 1973
8	"Mystery of the Haunted House"; Transliteration: "Obake Yashiki no Nazo no Maki" (Japanese: おばけ屋敷の謎の巻)	May 20, 1973
9	"The Great Quick-Slow Strategy"; Transliteration: "Kuikku Surō Dai Sakusen no Maki" (Japanese: クイック・スロー大作戦の巻)	May 27, 1973
9	"Nobita, the Rain Man"; Transliteration: "Nobita wa Ame Otoko no Maki" (Japanese: のび太は雨男の巻)	May 27, 1973
10	"Ultra Mixer"; Transliteration: "Urutora Mikisā no Maki" (Japanese: ウルトラミキサーの巻)	June 3, 1973
10	"Wishing Star, Shooting Star"; Transliteration: "Negai Boshi Nagare Boshi no Maki" (Japanese: ねがい星流れ星の巻)	June 3, 1973
11	"Mysterious Cloth"; Transliteration: "Fushigi na Furoshiki no Maki" (Japanese: ふしぎなふろしきの巻)	June 10, 1973
11	"Nobita's Grandma"; Transliteration: "Nobita no Obā-chan no Maki" (Japanese: のび太のおばあちゃんの巻)	June 10, 1973
12	"Red Bat of Major League"; Transliteration: "Dai Rīgu Aka Batto no Maki" (Japanese: 大リーグの赤バットの巻)	June 17, 1973
12	"To Compete with Man's Power"; Transliteration: "Otoko wa Chikara de Shōbu suru no Maki" (Japanese: 男は力で勝負するの巻)	June 17, 1973
13	"Gachako's Appearance"; Transliteration: "Gacha-ko Tōjō no Maki" (Japanese: ガチャ子登場の巻)	June 24, 1973
13	"The Talking Lipstick"; Transliteration: "Oshaberi Kuchi Be ni no Maki" (Japanese: おしゃべり口べにの巻)	June 24, 1973
14	"I Love this Camera"; Transliteration: "Sukisuki Kamera no Maki" (Japanese: すきすきカメラの巻)	July 1, 1973
14	"Date in the Milky Way"; Transliteration: "Ama no Gawa de Deito Shiyō no Maki" (Japanese: 天の川でデイトしようの巻)	July 1, 1973
15	"Weird Robot Car"; Transliteration: "Hen'na Robotto Kā no Maki" (Japanese: へんなロボットカーの巻)	July 8, 1973
15	"Smiling Soap"; Transliteration: "Nikoniko Sekken no Maki" (Japanese: ニコニコせっけんの巻)	July 8, 1973
16	"My Chief of the Inner Palace"; Transliteration: "Ore Shochō no Dai Ri no Maki" (Japanese: おれ署長のだいりの巻)	July 15, 1973
16	"Now is Summer! Let's Try to Ski"; Transliteration: "Sā Natsu da! Sukī wo Yarō no Maki" (Japanese: さあ夏だ！スキーをやろうの巻)	July 15, 1973
17	"I Hate Report Card"; Transliteration: "Seiseki Hyō wa Iya da nā no Maki" (Japanese: 成績表はいやだなあの巻)	July 29, 1973
17	"Catching My Shadow"; Transliteration: "Jibun no kage wo Tsukamaero no Maki" (Japanese: 自分のかげをつかまえろの巻)	July 29, 1973
18	"Going to Sea in a Submarine"; Transliteration: "Sensuikan de Umi Heikō no Maki" (Japanese: 潜水艦で海へ行こうの巻)	August 5, 1973
18	"Crazy Stomach Clock"; Transliteration: "Kurutta Hara Tokei no Maki" (Japanese: くるったハラ時計の巻)	August 5, 1973
19	"Camp Riot"; Transliteration: "Kyanpu Sōdō no Maki" (Japanese: キャンプ騒動の巻)	August 12, 1973
19	"Who is Going to Forget"; Transliteration: "Wasure na Gusa Te Nani Dake no Maki" (Japanese: 忘れな草って何だっけの巻)	August 12, 1973
20	"Cooler Parasol"; Transliteration: "Kūrā Parasoru no Maki" (Japanese: クーラーパラソルの巻)	August 19, 1973
20	"Always Diary"; Transliteration: "Itsudemo Nikki no Maki" (Japanese: いつでも日記の巻)	August 19, 1973
21	"The Homework Ghost Came Out"; Transliteration: "Shukudai Obake ga Deta no Maki" (Japanese: 宿題おばけが出たの巻)	August 26, 1973
21	"Weather Box"; Transliteration: "Otenki Bokkusu no Maki" (Japanese: お天気ボックスの巻)	August 26, 1973
22	"I Have One Vote of Betrayal"; Transliteration: "Boku ni Kiyoki Ichi Pyō wo no Maki" (Japanese: ぼくに清き一票をの巻)	September 2, 1973
22	"Manga Artist Training"; Transliteration: "Manga Ka Shugyō no Maki" (Japanese: まんが家修行の巻)	September 2, 1973
23	"Nice Girlfriend"; Transliteration: "Sutekina Gārufurendo no Maki" (Japanese: すてきなガールフレンドの巻)	September 9, 1973
23	"Flowery Riot"; Transliteration: "Gaippai Sōdō no Maki" (Japanese: 花いっぱい騒動の巻)	September 9, 1973
24	"Exact Crayon"; Transliteration: "Sokkuri Kureyon no Maki" (Japanese: そっくりクレヨンの巻)	September 16, 1973
24	"Shizuka's Birthday"; Transliteration: "Shizuka no Tanjōbi no Maki" (Japanese: しずかの誕生日の巻)	September 16, 1973
25	"I Wanna Be an Astronaut"; Transliteration: "Uchū Hikōshi ni Naritai no Maki" (Japanese: 宇宙飛行士になりたいの巻)	September 23, 1973
25	"Lost and Confused Riot"; Transliteration: "Maigo Magomago Ōsōdō no Maki" (Japanese: まいごマゴマゴ大騒動の巻)	September 23, 1973
26	"Nendoron Riot"; Transliteration: "Nendoron Ōsōdō no Maki" (Japanese: ネンドロン大騒動の巻)	September 30, 1973
26	"Goodbye, Doraemon"; Transliteration: "Sayōnara Doraemon no Maki" (Japanese: さようならドラえもんの巻)	September 30, 1973
