= Yoshiko Ōta =

Japanese actress and voice actress (1932–2021)

- 太田淑子
- Born: Yoshiko Saka (阪 淑子); April 25, 1932; Kyoto, Kyoto Prefecture, Empire of Japan
- Died: October 29, 2021 (aged 89); Kanagawa Prefecture, Japan
- Occupations: Voice actress; actress
- Years active: 1948–2021
- Agent: Theater Echo
- Spouse: Osamu Saka

Yoshiko Saka (阪 淑子, Saka Yoshiko; née Ōta, April 25, 1932 – October 29, 2021) known professionally as Yoshiko Ōta (太田淑子, Ōta Yoshiko) was a Japanese voice actress and actress from Kyoto Prefecture, affiliated with Theater Echo.

She is best known for voice roles such as Leo/Kimba in Kimba the White Lion, Tanpei in Time Bokan, Gan-chan/Yatterman No.1 in Yatterman, Sewashi in Doraemon, Nobita Nobi in Doraemon, Princess Sapphire in Princess Knight, Atsuko "Akko" Kagami in The Secret of Akko-chan, Kyoko Otowa in Aim for the Ace!, Chizuko Makieda in D.N.Angel, Panny/Baby Panda in Panda! Go Panda!, Peebo in Chodenshi Bioman, and Urasue in InuYasha.

== Biography ==
Ōta was born in Kyoto, Kyoto Prefecture, Empire of Japan on April 25, 1932.

She joined Takarazuka Revue in 1947, and remained with them until 1952. She joined Theater Echo in 1963.

In 2016, she received the Tokyo Anime Award Festival's Merit Award.

Ōta died from heart failure on October 29, 2021, at the age of 89. Her death was announced on November 9 by Theater Echo.

== Personal life ==
She married fellow voice actor Osamu Saka, whom she met while a member of the Takarazuka Revue. The couple moved to Tokyo in 1964.

Throughout the 1960s, Ōta voiced the heroes and heroines in animated adaptations of Osamu Tezuka's works. She even managed to appear as a voice actress in all three anime series of The Secret of Akko-chan. When she was cast to voice Princess Sapphire in Princess Knight, she was overjoyed, as it was a role she always wanted to play.

She was the voice of Nobita Nobi for the first Doraemon anime series in 1973. In the second Doraemon anime series that ran from 1979 to 2005, she voiced Nobita's great-great-grandson Sewashi.

Originally, Time Bokan and Yatterman were intended to focus on the main hero and heroine, voiced by her and Mari Okamoto. However, the villainous trios of both series were so entertaining with audiences and the staff that they became the main characters. Ōta expressed her personal frustration at this decision, remarking, "It's always the bad guys who get all the attention."

== Successors ==
The following individuals took over some of Ōta's acting roles after her death.

Successor	Character	Work	Debut
Maki Zenin	Hung Chu / Yellow Pearl (Kim Jeong-ran)	Snake & Crane Arts of Shaolin (TBS version)	Additional content in the J:COM BS version

== Filmography ==
=== Television animation ===
List of voice performances in television animation
Year	Title	Role	Notes	Source
1964	Big X	Akira Asagumo		
1964	Astro Boy	Rin/Phosphorus (Atom's mother)		
1965	Space Patrol Hopper	Ruby		
1965	Jungle Emperor Leo	Leo/Kimba	Lead role	
1967	The Golden Bat	Basco		
1967	Adventure on the Gaboten Island	Igao		
1967	Princess Knight	Princess Sapphire	Lead role	
1968	The Monster Kid	Haniwa-kun		
1968	Sasuke	Kasumi Tsubaki		
1968	Boy's Detective Team	Narrator		
1969	Marine Boy	Elm Boy	Ep. 25	
1969	The Secret of Akko-chan	Atsuko "Akko" Kagami	Lead role	
1970	Norakuro	Private Megane		
1970	The Adventures of Hutch the Honeybee	Additional voice		
1971	Little Ghost Q-Tarō	Shōta Ōhara	Main role	
1971	The Extravagant Muchabei	Additional voice		
1971	Marvelous Melmo	Nitako	Ep. 6	
1971	Genshi Shōnen Ryū	Don		
1971	Maco the Mermaid	Nobuko, Rika	Nobuko in Ep. 32, Rika in Ep. 41	
1972	The One Who Loves Justice: Moonlight Mask	Alan Boy		
1973	Aim for the Ace!	Kyoko Otowa		
1973	The Gutsy Frog	Additional voice		
1973	Doraemon	Nobita Nobi	Main role	
1974	Jim Button	Jim	Lead role	
1975	Laura, the Prairie Girl	John		
1975	Time Bokan	Tanpei, Mirror	Lead role; Mirror in Ep. 18	
1975	Kum-Kum	Aron		
1977	Ippatsu Kanta-kun	Kanta Tobase		
1977	Paul's Miraculous Adventure	Peter		
1977	Yatterman	Gan-chan/Yatterman No.1	Main role	
1977	Manga Japanese Picture Scroll	Additional voice		
1978	The Adventures of the Little Prince	Peter		
1979	Undersea Super Train: Marine Express	Princess Sapphire		
1979	The Ultraman	Ichiro Okawara		
1979	Wandering Girl Nell	Kit		
1979	Zenderman	Tsukiyoshimaru, Paknam, Santa, Kanta	Tsukiyoshimaru in Ep. 5, Paknam in Ep. 21, Santa in Ep. 26, Kanta in Ep. 34	
1979	Doraemon	Jaiko Gōda, Sewashi	First voice of Jaiko Gōda	
1979	The Rose of Versailles	Jeanne (Fake Antoinette)		
1980	Fisherman Sanpei	Jin		
1981	Ai no Gakko Cuore Monogatari	Galoffi		
1981	Toshishun	Toshishun	Lead role	
1981	Jarinko Chie	Antonio Jr.	Main role	
1981	Yattodetaman	Santa, Pack		
1982	Urusei Yatsura	Kōmori	Ep. 27	
1982	ni-shi manrui	Tokuzo's wife		
1982	Miss Machiko	Ms. Aoshima		
1983	The Yearling	Jody Baxter		
1984	Chikkun Takkun	Miyo's grandmother		
1986	Hikari no Densetsu	Hitomi Kamijou		
1988	Osomatsu-kun	Jinbeider	Eps 14, 85	
1988	The Secret of Akko-chan	Kyōko Kagami (Atsuko "Akko" Kagami's mother)		
1989	Blue Blink	Maha Maha	Ep. 31	
1989	Jungle Emperor Leo	Palna		
1989	Miracle Giants Dome-kun	Torao Tsutenkaku		
1989	Ranma ½	Chou, Ono Kin		
1990	Magical Hat	Midori		
1991	Anime Himitsu no Hanazono	Sarah Ann Medlock	Main role	
1991	Jarinko Chie 2	Antonio Jr.	Main role	
1991	Marude Dameo	Sayuri's mother		
1994	Tsuyoshi, Hold Tight	Nozomi's mother		
1998	Sentimental Graffiti	Ayasaki Misao		
1998	The Secret of Akko-chan	Old Lady		
2001	Inuyasha	Urasue	Debuts in Ep. 14	
2003	D.N.Angel	Chizuko Fujieda		
2006	A Spirit of the Sun	Tami		
2016	Witchy Pretty Cure!	Legend Queen	Final television anime role	

=== Theatrical animation ===
List of voice performances in theatrical animation
Year	Title	Role	Notes	Source
1966	Kimba the White Lion	Leo/Kimba	Lead role	
1969	The Monster Kid	Haniwa-kun		
1969	The Secret of Akko-chan	Atsuko "Akko" Kagami	Lead role	
1970	The Secret of Akko-chan: Tears of the Rolling Receive	Atsuko "Akko" Kagami	Lead role	
1970	The Secret of Akko-chan: Hooray for Pet-kun	Atsuko "Akko" Kagami	Lead role	
1972	Panda! Go Panda!	Pan-chan/Panny/Baby Panda		
1973	Panda! Go Panda!: The Rainy-Day Circus	Tora-chan/Tiny/Baby Tiger		
1973	Panda's Adventures	Ronron		
1975	The Little Humpbacked Horse	Ivan		
1977	Tenguri, Boy of the Plains	Additional voice		
1977	Yatterman	Gan-chan/Yatterman No.1		
1981	Jarinko Chie	Masaru's mother, Chie's classmate		
1989	The Secret of Akko-chan	Kyōko Kagami (Atsuko "Akko" Kagami's mother)		
1991	Dorami-chan: Wow, The Kid Gang of Bandits!	Sewashi	Short film	
1993	Dorami-chan: Hello, Dynosis Kids!!	Sewashi	Short film	
1995	2112: The Birth of Doraemon	Sewashi	Short film	
1997	Chikyū ga Ugoita Hi	Kinue Tachibana		

=== Original video animation (OVA) ===
List of voice performances in original video animation
Year	Title	Role	Notes	Source
1984	Cream Lemon: SF Super Dimensional Legend Rall	Perle		
1988	Mobile Police Patlabor	Shikake no ine		
1988	Video Picture Book: Sun Wukong	Narrator		
1989	Hisaichi Ishii's Nandakanda Theater 1: The Rumored Underground People / It's All the Fault of the Top Brass!!	Additional voice		
1994	Time Bokan: Royal Revival	Gan-chan/Yatterman No.1		

=== Video games ===
- Time Bokan Series: Bokan to Ippatsu! Doronbo (1997): Tanpei, Gan-chan/Yatterman No.1
- Bokan Desu yo (1998): Tanpei, Gan-chan/Yatterman No.1
- The Secret of Akko-chan: Little Witching Mischiefs (1999): Atsuko Kagami
- Kids Station: Doraemon: Himitsu no Yojigen Pocket (2001): Sewashi Nobi
- Inuyasha (2001): Urasue
- Bokan GoGoGo (2001): Tanpei, Gan-chan/Yatterman No.1
- Slotter Up Core 3: Yuda! Doronjo ni Omakase (2004): Tanpei, Gan-chan/Yatterman No.1

=== Dubbing ===
==== Animation ====
- Dumbo (1941): Elephant Giddy (Dorothy Scott) (1983 re-release version)
- Bambi (1942): Mrs. Rabbit (Margaret Lee) (digital version)
- Fun and Fancy Free (1947): Mickey Mouse (TBS version)
- Peanuts (1950): Linus van Pelt (Theatrical version)
- Peter Pan (1953): Mary Darling (1984 version and current version)
- The Snow Queen (1957): Kai (TV Tokyo version)
- Frankenstein Jr. and The Impossibles (1966): Buzz Conroy (Dick Beals)
- The Tom and Jerry Comedy Show (1980): Jerry
- The Silly, Silly Tom and Jerry Parade (1980): Jerry
- The Fox and the Hound (1981): Vixey (Sandy Duncan)
- The Black Cauldron (1985): Orwen (Adele Malis-Morey)
- The Great Mouse Detective (1986): additional voice
- Bambi II (2006): Mrs. Rabbit (Kath Soucie)

== Awards ==
Year	Award	Category	Result	Ref.
2016	Tokyo Anime Award	Merit Award	Honored	
