= Jungle Kurobe =

Japanese anime television series

- Cover of the manga series as seen as part of Fujiko Fujio Land

ジャングル黒べえ (Janguru Kurobē)
- Genre: Comedy
- Manga
- Written by: Fujiko Fujio
- Published by: Shogakukan
- Original run: February 1973 – November 1973
- Volumes: 1
- Anime television series
- Directed by: Osamu Dezaki
- Music by: Goro Misawa
- Studio: Tokyo Movie (Note: Production assistance for all episodes provided by A-Production.)
- Original network: ANN (MBS, NET)
- Original run: 2 March 1973 – 28 September 1973
- Episodes: 31

Jungle Kurobe (ジャングル黒べえ, Janguru Kurobē) is a manga series written and illustrated by Fujiko F. Fujio (credited as Fujiko Fujio), which was serialized between February and November 1973.

It tells the adventures of a Tarzanesque child and his friends in modern Tokyo. It consists of 31 episodes and was originally broadcast on TV Asahi. The show is most famous for having initial character designs by famous anime director Hayao Miyazaki of Spirited Away and My Neighbor Totoro, though due to Fujiko F Fujio's involvement, the final designs were done by Yoshio Kabashima, known for his work on Gamba no Bouken and Lupin the 3rd: The Mystery of Mamo.

In 1989, its manga and anime were pulled from circulation after a chapter from Obake no Q-Tarō was deemed "racially offensive for its portrayal of Africans" and essentially became banned in Japan. However, the series was reprinted as part of the Complete Works of Fujiko F. Fujio collection in 2010 and TMS released the show in 2015 on DVD alongside Umeboshi Denka, with a reprint being issued in 2024.

== Media ==
=== Manga ===
The titular main character of the series as depicted in the anime

The manga was serialized in Shogakukan's educational magazines from February (March issue) to November (December issue) in 1973 to coincide roughly with the anime version, as well as in the Osaka evening edition of the Mainichi Shimbun.

After this, a few chapters were included in other works by the author, including Bakeru-kun and Big Korotan's Fujiko Manga Heroes All Together.

The series was then collected into the Fujiko Fujio Land collection in 1988, though excluded some chapters and other material.

The following year it was abruptly pulled from circulation entirely in response to the pulling of a chapter from Obake no Q-Tarō circulation, resulting it becoming a "sealed work".

The series only was republished as part of the Complete Works of Fujiko F. Fujio collection starting in 2010, containing disclaimers for any content possibly deemed discriminatory and includes all chapters and some extra material in its volume.

=== Anime ===
The anime was originally broadcast from 2 March 1973 to 28 September 1973, with episodes being broadcast every week and having 2 segments each. (Note: Episode 25 was the only episode not divided into separate segments) The series was later rebroadcast between the mid-1970s until 1989 when the anime was likewise also "sealed" following the controversy relating to Obake no Q-Tarō.

Until it was made available on DVD by TMS in 2015, the series was only viewable through low quality videotapes posted online.

== Cast ==
- Kaneta Kimotsuki as Kurobe
- Kazuko Sugiyama as Shishio Sarari
- Eiko Masuyama as Toriko Sarari
- Hiroshi Ohtake as Sensei
- Junko Hori as Okara
- Keisuke Yamashita as Tiger
- Kouji Yada as Mitsuru Sarari
- Masako Ebisu as Takane Fujino
- Reiko Katsura as Aka-bee
- Tetsuo Mizutori as Pao Pao
- Yoshiko Yamamoto as Gakku
