= Shun Yashiro =

Japanese actor (1933–2003)

- 八代 駿
- Born: Motohiro Suzuki (鈴木 基弘); February 19, 1933; Tsuyama, Okayama, Japan
- Died: June 25, 2003 (aged 70); Sumida Ward, Tokyo, Japan
- Other names: Shun (シュン) (nickname); Tetsuya Yashiro (矢代 哲也); Kazuo Yashiro (矢代 和雄); Shun Yashiro (矢代 駿)
- Occupations: Actor, voice actor
- Years active: 1960–2003
- Agent: Theater Echo
- Spouse: Michiko Hirai (until 1964)

Shun Yashiro (八代 駿, Yashiro Shun; born Motohiro Suzuki (鈴木 基弘, Suzuki Motohiro) (February 19, 1933 – June 25, 2003) was a Japanese actor and voice actor from Tsuyama, Okayama.

At the time of his death, he was affiliated with Theater Echo. Throughout his career, he was also known by the names of Tetsuya Yashiro (矢代 哲也, Yashiro Tetsuya), Kazuo Yashiro (矢代 和雄, Yashiro Kazuo), and Shun Yashiro (矢代 駿, Yashiro Shun).

Yashiro was best known for the providing the dubbing voices of Tom Cat in the TBS version of Tom and Jerry and Winnie-the-Pooh in various Disney productions.

Notable anime voice acting roles of his are Suneo Honekawa in Doraemon and Nishihajime in Inakappe Taishō.

== Biography ==
Yashiro graduated from Meiji University's School of Political Science and Economics. Afterwards he became a member of the voice actor management company Theater Echo, performing in numerous radio dramas.

=== Death ===
Yashiro died of a stroke on June 25, 2003, at the age of 70.

== Filmography ==
=== Television animation ===
- Demetan Croaker, The Boy Frog (Kyaru)
- Dokaben (Ryō Inugami)
- Doraemon (Suneo Honekawa)
- Kaibutsu-kun (TV 2) (Bem)
- Inakappe Taishō (Nishihajime)
- Star of the Giants (Kawazoe)
- Vicky the Viking (Golem)

=== Theatrical animation ===
- Night on the Galactic Railroad
- Metropolis (Notarlin)
- Royal Space Force: The Wings of Honneamise (Speaker voice)

=== Tokusatsu ===
- Kamen Rider (Amazonia (Ep 22), Kinokomorgue (Ep 24-25), Ghoster (Ep 41), Fly Man (Ep 42), Unicornos (Ep 51), Earthworm Man (Ep 59), Rebirth Harinezuras (Ep 66), Girizames (Ep 67), Gillerkourogi (Ep 69), Abugomens (Ep 71), Mosquiras (Ep 72), Sasoritokages (Ep 81), Sabotenbat (Ep 96))
- Henshin Ninja Arashi (Kamakirigalan (Ep 9), Nomidokuro (Ep 16), Kawauso (Ep 20), Sphinx (Ep 26), Rebirth Franken (Ep 34), Backbeard (Ep 42), Ghostfather (Ep 44))
- Kamen Rider V3 (Squid Fire (Ep 3-4), Pickel Shark (Ep 11-12), Burner Bat (Ep 15), Speargun Sealion (Ep 22), Propeller Rhinoceros beetle (Ep 23), Quoits Stag beetle (Ep 27-28), Camera Mosquito (Ep 29), Will-o'-the-Wisp Walrus (Ep 32), Thorned Starfish (Ep 48), Rebirth Will-o'-the-Wisp Walrus (Ep 51))
- Kamen Rider V3 Movie (Cannon Buffalo Rebirth Pickel Shark)
- Kamen Rider X (Cyclops (Ep 5), Mach Achilles (Ep 9-10), Alseides (Ep 17), Scorpion Geronimo (Ep 22-24), Chameleon Phantoma (Ep 29), Tiger Nero (Ep 34))
- Five Riders Vs. Kingdark (Rebirth Mach Achilles, Rebirth Cyclops, Rebirth Alseides, Rebirth Hydra)
- Kamen Rider Amazon (Crocodilia Beastman (Ep 8))
- Kamen Rider Stronger (Kikkaijin Grongame (Ep 4), Mantis Kikkaijin (Ep 9), Kikkaijin Elekiika (Ep 13), Kikkaijin Arijigoku (Ep 20))
- Kamen Rider (Skyrider) (Sasoranjin (Ep 4), Shibirayjin (Ep 18), Dokuganba (Ep 26), Hirubiran (Ep 27), Hikarabeeno (Ep 29), Okappa Priest (Ep 39-40), Zombieda (Ep 42), Abunger (Ep 45-47), Zenyoju (Ep 49))
- Skyrider Movie (Jaguar Van)
- Kamen Rider Super-1 (Elekibas (Ep 3), Ganigannii (Ep 9), JawsWani (Ep 11), Tsutadenma (Ep 20), GlasunKid (Ep 27), FrankeLighter (Ep 39), Goldar (Ep 43))
- Kamen Rider Super-1 Movie (Rebirth Fire Kong, Rebirth Golden Jaguar,)
- Pettonton (Jamolar (Eps 2-21, 23-28, 30-33, 35-37, 41, 46))
- Choudenshi Bioman (1984, 31 episodes) - Messerjuu
- Kyodai Ken Byclosser (Geronimo (Ep 2), Tankbombe (Ep 10), Focusman (Ep 20), Hyakumegun (Ep 26), Karasu (Ep ？), Fudebakon (Ep 31))
- Gekisou Sentai Carranger (WW Waritcho (Ep 20))
- Seijuu Sentai Gingaman (Geltgelt (Ep 26))

=== Video games ===
- Sonic Adventure (Big the Cat)

=== Dubbing roles ===
==== Live-action ====
- The Empire Strikes Back (1980 Movie theater edition) (Captain Lennox)
- Singin' in the Rain (Cosmo Brown)

==== Animation ====
- The Jungle Book (Kaa)
- Secret Squirrel (Morocco Mole)
- Thunderbird 6 (TV edition) (Brains)
- The Tigger Movie (Winnie-the-Pooh)
- Tom and Jerry (original series) (Tom)
- Snow White and the Seven Dwarfs (Huntsman)
- Toy Story (Lenny)

=== Other ===
- Pooh's Hunny Hunt (Winnie-the-Pooh)
- Tokyo Disneyland Electrical Parade DreamLights (Winnie-the-Pooh)
