= The Monster Kid =

Shōnen manga and anime series

- Kaibutsu-kun
- Volume 1 of the 'Kaibutsu-kun' manga

怪物(かいぶつ)くん
- Genre: Horror, comedy, fantasy, adventure
- Manga

Kaibutsu-kun (1965–1969)
- Written by: Fujiko Fujio
- Published by: Shōnen Gahosha
- Magazine: Shōnen Gahō; Shōnen King
- Original run: January 1965 – April 1969
- Volumes: 13 (1965–1969)
- Manga

Kaibutsu-kun (1980–1982)
- Written by: Fujiko Fujio
- Published by: Shogakukan
- Magazine: CoroCoro Comic etc.
- Original run: March 1980 – November 1982
- Volumes: 21 (1965–1982)
- Manga

Kaibutsu-kun (2021)
- Written by: Fujiko Fujio A
- Published by: Shogakukan
- Volumes: 8 pages
- Anime television series
- Directed by: Masaaki Osumi; Shinichi Suzuki (animation)
- Studio: Tokyo Movie; Studio Zero
- Original network: JNN (TBS)
- Original run: April 21, 1968 – March 23, 1969
- Episodes: 50
- Anime television series
- Directed by: Hiroshi Fukutomi
- Music by: Hiroshi Tsutsui
- Studio: Shin-Ei Animation
- Original network: ANN (TV Asahi)
- Original run: September 2, 1980 – September 28, 1982
- Episodes: 94
- Anime film

Kaibutsu-kun: Invitation to Monster Land
- Directed by: Hiroshi Fukutomi
- Produced by: Sōichi Besshi; Tetsuo Kanno; Yoshifusa Sanada
- Written by: Fujiko Fujio; Seiji Matsuoka
- Music by: Asei Kobayashi
- Studio: Shin-Ei Animation
- Released: March 14, 1981
- Runtime: 75 minutes
- Anime film

Kaibutsu-kun: The Demon Sword
- Directed by: Hiroshi Fukutomi
- Produced by: Sōichi Besshi; Tetsuo Kanno; Yoshifusa Sanada
- Written by: Seiji Matsuoka
- Music by: Hiroshi Tsutsui
- Studio: Shin-Ei Animation
- Released: March 13, 1982
- Runtime: 52 minutes
- Television drama
- Studio: Nippon Television
- Original network: NNS (NTV)
- Original run: April 17, 2010 – June 12, 2010
- Episodes: 9
- Live-action film

Kaibutsu-kun: The Movie
- Directed by: Yoshihiro Nakamura
- Released: November 26, 2011

Kaibutsu-kun/The Monster Kid (怪物くん, Kaibutsu-kun) is a shōnen manga and anime series by Fujiko Fujio A. The first series was broadcast on TBS from April 21, 1968, to March 23, 1969. The second series was broadcast on TV Asahi from September 2, 1980, to September 28, 1982. A live-action series was broadcast on Nippon Television and Yomiuri Television from April 17 to June 12, 2010. The 94-episode 1982 iteration was aired around the world, marketed as The Monster Kid, which was the official English title.

== Plot ==
Kaibutsu-kun (Monster Kid) and his companions, Dracula, Wolfman, and Franken, travel from Monster Land to the Human Realm, where they encounter and battle several monsters, mainly assassins from the demon group Demonish.

== Cast ==
- Tarou Kaibutsu (怪物太郎,, Kaibutsu Tarō) - A little boy who can metamorph.
  - Voiced by: Fuyumi Shiraishi ('68), Masako Nozawa ('80)
- Hiroshi Ichikawa (市川ヒロシ,, Ichikawa Hiroshi) - Taro's friend, who lives with his sister Utako.
  - Voiced by: Minori Matsushima ('68), Katsue Miwa ('80)
- Utako Ichikawa (市川歌子,, Ichikawa Utako) - Hiroshi's older sister. Both are orphans who live in Arama-sō, a two-story Japanese apartment. She takes care of her litte brother.
  - Voiced by: Mariko Mukai ('68), Chiyoko Kawashima ('80)
- Count Dracula (ドラキュラ, Dorakyura) - A vampire who drinks tomato juice instead of human blood, and tends to put "damasu" at the end of every sentence. In the TV drama series, he often puts English phrases in every sentence.
  - Voiced by: Hiroshi Ohtake ('68), Kaneta Kimotsuki ('80)
- Wolfman (オオカミ男,, Ookami-Otoko) - The housekeeper and cook. He tends to put "gansu" at the end of every sentence.
  - Voiced by: Shingo Kanemoto ('68), Takuzou Kamiyama ('80)
- Franken (フランケン, Furanken) - He is big, and not especially smart.
  - Voiced by: Masao Imanishi ('68), Taro Sagami / Shingo Kanemoto ('80)
- Kaibutsu Daiō (怪物大王,, King Monster) Taro's father and King of Monsterland.
  - Voiced by: Dai Kanai ('80)
- Kaiko-chan (怪子ちゃん) - Taro's girlfriend.
  - Voiced by: Eiko Masuyama ('68, '80)
- Doctor Noh (ドクター・ノオ, Dokutā Noo)
  - Voiced by: Reizō Nomoto ('80)
- Fishman (半魚人)
  - Voiced by: Shigeru Chiba ('80)
- Nonbirasu (ノンビラス)
  - Voiced by: Ken'ichi Ogata ('80)
- Bem (ベム)
  - Voiced by: Hiroshi Ohtake / Shun Yashiro ('80)
- Demokin (プリンス・デモキン) - Prince of the demons.
  - Voiced by: Eiko Yamada ('80)
- Ako (アコ) - Hiroshi's classmate.
  - Voiced by: Keiko Han ('80)
- Kizao (キザオ) - Hiroshi's classmate.
  - Voiced by: Sanji Hase ('80)
- Banno (番野) - Hiroshi's classmate.
  - Voiced by: Kiyonobu Suzuki ('80)

== Media ==
=== Television drama ===
A TV drama adaptation was aired on Nippon TV in 2010 with nine episodes. Two drama specials were aired after the initial airing of the drama series in June 2010, where the author of Kaibutsu-kun appears as a guest, and October 2011.

There are some differences between the anime and the live action series, especially for the setting and the characters. Neither Hiroshi's classmates in the anime appear in the TV drama series. The new characters are Wolfman's daughter, the landlady of Arama-sō and a policeman. The theme song for the TV drama series is Monster by Japanese boy band Arashi.

==== Plot ====
Kaibutsu-kun is a rambunctious prince of Kaibutsu Land. On the day of succession to the throne, he is ordered to go to the world of humans by the King of Kaibutsu Land for ascetic training. Kaibutsu-kun and his attendants, Dracula, Wolfman, and Franken, travel to the world of humans and encounter several monsters or humans belonging to the demon group led by Demorina who tries to set the prince of demon back on track and take over the world.

==== Main casts ====
- Satoshi Ohno as Kaibutsu-kun
- Norito Yashima as Dracula
- Ryuhei Ueshima as Wolfman
- Choi Hong-man as Franken
- Umika Kawashima as Ichikawa Utako

=== Live-action film ===
A 3D movie titled Kaibutsu-kun: the Movie (映画 怪物くん, Eiga Kaibutsu-kun) was released on November 26, 2011, directed by Yoshihiro Nakamura. It went on to be a commercial success in Japan and earned ¥3.14 billion ($39,766,344).
