= Mitsuki Nakamura =

Japanese art director and mecha designer (1944–2011)

- Born: April 7, 1944; Tokyo, Japan
- Died: May 16, 2011 (aged 67)
- Occupations: Art director; designer; illustrator
- Years active: 1965–2011
- Employers: Toei Doga (1960–1963); Tatsunoko Production (1964–1976); Design Office Mecaman (1976–2011)

Mitsuki Nakamura (中村 光毅, Nakamura Mitsuki) (April 7, 1944 – May 16, 2011) was an art director and mecha designer in the Japanese anime industry.

After working for Toei Doga, he joined Tatsunoko Productions, where he drew background art and designed mecha, supporting the first Tatsunoko golden age. After leaving Tatsunoko, he founded Design Office Mecaman and served as its representative director.

== Style ==
Nakamura worked as art director on a number of anime works and has likewise worked as a mechanical designer.

He is one of the pioneering mecha designers in the Japanese anime industry and was the first to have his name included in the end credits. (Note: Prior to this, there were still no designers specialising in mecha in the anime industry, and the character designers or art directors doubled as designers for the mecha that appeared in animation. Robot-like objects were often assigned to character designers, while building facilities and vehicles were often assigned to art directors.) His best-known works as a mecha designer include Mach Five from Speed Racer, God Phoenix from Science Ninja Team Gatchaman and Time Mechabuton from Time Bokan. Mach Five, in particular, is regarded as a masterpiece of the first Tatsunoko golden age for its outstanding design sense, and its design was so perfect that it was used almost unchanged in the 2008 live-action film Speed Racer by The Wachowskis, 40 years later.

However, his speciality was not mecha design, but anime background art. Background art plays a very important role in Japanese-style animation expression techniques. This has become increasingly the case in recent years, and Nakamura's art was one of the factors to move in this direction. His representative works as an art director include Science Ninja Team Gatchaman, Mobile Suit Gundam, and Nausicaä of the Valley of the Wind.

== Career ==
After graduating from junior high school, Nakamura joined Toei Doga through the help of his school teacher. He gained experience in various jobs as an assistant and then as a member of the colouring staff, where he developed his knowledge of paints and colours.

Nakamura, who wanted to paint background art, moved to the newly established Tatsunoko Productions in 1964 through an introduction from Toei. After working on the studio's first TV series Space Ace, his love of cars led him to design cars for the studio's second work, the car racing anime series Speed Racer.

He became head of the art section, where he instructs Yoshitaka Amano and Kunio Okawara. At that time, Tatsunoko's art section was not only responsible for art, but also for the design of backgrounds, props, robots and cars, all of which were entrusted to Nakamura, who was trusted by the president, Tatsuo Yoshida. The staff included many aspiring painters who had left art college, some working for a living and some with personalities of their own, and he had to lead them as section head. With the number of animations even increasing, it was impossible for him to do everything on his own. He therefore decided to entrust some of the mechanical design work to Okawara, who had just joined Tatsunoko. Nakamura and Okawara were credited as mechanical designers for the first time in Japanese animation history in Science Ninja Team Gatchaman, which began airing in 1972.

At the end of 1976, he left Tatsunoko Productions and founded Design Office Mecaman with Kunio Okawara. Initially, Mecaman was planned to be a mecha design company, as Okawara was also a member of the company. However, he soon became independent and the company specialised in background art.

Nakamura died of oral cancer on May 16, 2011, at the age of 67.

== Works ==
Year	Title	Credits	Notes
TV anime series
1965-1966	Space Ace	Background art	
1967-1968	Speed Racer	Art director	Although only credited as art director, he actually did more than that, working on mecha design and OP key frames. (Note: He himself redrew the key frames for the OP as the animators of the time could not grasp the three-dimensional shape of the car and could not draw Mach Five.) He designed Mach Five.
1967-1968	Oraa Guzura Dado	Art director	
1968-1969	Dokachin the Primitive Boy	Art director	
1969	Judo Boy	Background art	
1969-1970	The Genie Family	Art director	
1970-1971	The Adventures of Hutch the Honeybee	Art director	
1970-1972	Inakappe Taishō	Art director	
1971	Animentary: Decision	Art settings	
1971-1972	Hyppo and Thomas	Art director	
1972	Pinocchio: The Series	Background art	
1972-1973	Tamagon the Counselor	Art	
1972-1974	Science Ninja Team Gatchaman	Art director, mecha design	He designed the mecha for the main characters, including God Phoenix. The enemy mecha & guest mecha were designed by Kunio Okawara.
1973	Demetan Croaker, The Boy Frog	Art director	
1973-1974	Casshan	Art director	He worked not only on art but also on mechanical design. One staff member was selected as an assistant, and Kunio Okawara helped him a little.
1974-1975	Hurricane Polymar	Art director, mecha design	He designed the main character mecha and Kunio Okawara designed the enemy mecha.
1975	Tekkaman: The Space Knight	Art director	He designed the Blue Earth, Yoshitaka Amano designed Tekkaman and Pegas, and Kunio Okawara designed the enemy mecha.
1975-1976	Time Bokan	Art director, mecha design	He designed the main mecha and almost all the sub-mecha and guest mecha.
1976-1977	Paul's Miraculous Adventure	Art director, mecha design	
1976-1977	Robokko Beeton	Art director	
1977-1978	Supercar Gattiger	Art director, mecha design	
1977-1979	Yatterman	Mecha design	Time Bokan series 2nd. He only designed two main mechas, Yatter One and Yatter Pelican. The other main mecha, which appeared mid-season, and sub mecha were designed by Kunio Okawara. (Note: After this work, Okawara took over the mecha design of the Time Bokan series.)
1977-1978	Invincible Super Man Zambot 3	Art director	
1978-1979	Uchū Majin Daikengo	Art director	
1978-1979	Gatchaman II	Art design	
1978-1979	Invincible Steel Man Daitarn 3	Art	Credited as Mecaman. (Note: Actually he was the art director.)
1979	Yamato: The New Voyage	Mecha settings	
1979	Kaitō Lupine 813 no Nazo	Art director	
1979-1980	Gatchaman Fighter	Art design	
1979-1980	Mobile Suit Gundam	Art director	
1979-1980	The Ultraman	Art	
1980	The Wonderful Adventures of Nils	Art director	
1980-1981	Space Runaway Ideon	Art director	Under the pseudonym Tetsuya Shijō (四条 徹也, Shijō Tetsuya). (Note: This was because he had previously signed a contract to work on The Wonderful Adventures of Nils.)
1981-1984	Urusei Yatsura	Art director	
1981-1982	Golden Warrior Gold Lightan	Art PIC	
1981-1983	Fang of the Sun Dougram	Art director	
1981	Bremen 4: Angels in Hell	Art director	
1981-1983	Miss Machiko	Art director	
1982	Shiroi Kiba: White Fang Story	Stage settings	
1982-1983	The Mysterious Cities of Gold	Art director	
1983-1984	Mrs. Pepper Pot	Art director	
1984-1987	Fist of the North Star	Art design	
1984-1985	Persia, the Magic Fairy	Art director	
1985	Dirty Pair	Art director	
1987-1989	The Three Musketeers	Art	
1987-1989	Metal Armor Dragonar	Art	
1988-1989	Grimm's Fairy Tale Classics	Art director	
1988	The Burning Wild Man	Art director	
1989	Lupin III TV special: Bye-Bye Liberty Crisis	Art director	
1993-1994	Tanoshii Willows Town	Art settings	
1994-1995	Ginga Sengoku Gun'yūden Rai	Art director	
1996-1997	Gambalist! Shun	Art director	
1996	The Life and Adventures of Santa Claus	Art director	
1996-1997	You're Under Arrest	Art director	
1997	Speed Racer X	Art director	
1998	Maico 2010	Art director	
1998	Zazca	Art director	
1998	Shadow Skill	Art director	
2000-2001	The Legend of the Gambler: Tetsuya	Art design	
2000	Time Bokan 2000: Kaitou Kiramekiman	Art director	
2000-2001	Mighty Cat Masked Niyander	Art director	
2001	Kinnikuman: Ultimate Muscle	Art director	
2002	Jing: King of Bandits	Art director	
2002-2003	Tsuribaka Nisshi	Art director	
2003-2005	Bobobo-bo Bo-bobo	Art design	
2004	Wind: A Breath of Heart	Art director	
2004-2005	Beet the Vandel Buster	Art design	
2005-2006	Beet the Vandel Buster: Excellion	Art design	
2005	Akahori Gedou Hour Rabuge	Art director	
2005-2006	Gaiking: Legend of Daiku-Maryu	Art director	
2007	Les Misérables: Shōjo Cosette	Art director	
2008-2009	Yatterman (remake)	Art director	
2009	Fresh Pretty Cure!	Art	Episodes 11 and 18 only.
Anime films
1978	Science Ninja Team Gatchaman: The Movie	Art director	
1981-1982	Mobile Suit Gundam I, II, III	Art director	
1982	Techno Police 21C	Art settings	
1982	The Ideon: A Contact & The Ideon: Be Invoked	Art director	Unlike the TV version, he is credited under his real name.
1983	Crusher Joe	Art director	
1983	Dougram: Documentary of the Fang of the Sun	Art	
1984	Nausicaä of the Valley of the Wind	Art director	
1984	Chikyuu Monogatari Telepath 2500	Art director	
1987	Aitsu to Lullaby: Suiyōbi no Cinderella	Art director	
1987	Bats & Terry	Art director	
1989	Hengen Taima Yakō Karura Mau! Nara Onryō Emaki	Art director	
1991	Musha, Khisi, Command: SD Gundam Kinkyū Shutsugeki	Art	
1993	Rokudenashi Blues 1993	Art	
1994	Raiyantsūrī no uta	Art	
1996	PiPi Tobenai Hotaru	Art director	
1997	Eikō eno Spur -Igaya Chiharu Monogatari-	Art director	
2002	Ecchan no Sensō	Art director	
2008	Pattenrai!! ~ Minami no Shima no Mizu Monogatari	Art director	
2009	Movie Fresh Pretty Cure! The Kingdom of Toys has Lots of Secrets!?	Art director	
OVA
1983-1985	Dallos	Art director	
1985-1986	Area 88	Art director	
1985	Kochira Katsushika-ku Kameari Kōen mae Hashutsujo	Art director	
1985	Megazone 23	Art director	
1986	Twinkle heart: Ginga-kei made Todokanai	Art director, art settings, boards	
1988	Space Family Carlvinson	Art director	
1988	Tokyo Vice	Art settings	
1989-1992	Crying Freeman	Art director	
1989-1990	High-Speed Jecy	Art director	
1990-1991	Hengen Taima Yakō Karura Mau! Sendai Kokeshi Enka	Art director	
1990	Hana no Asuka-gumi!: Lonely Cats Battle Royale	Art director	
1991	Vampire Wars	Art director	
1991	Slow Step	Art director	
1992	Apfelland Monogatari	Art director	
1992-1993	Kishin Corps	Art director	
Video games
1997	Itoi Shigesato no Bass Tsuri No. 1	Art settings	
TV drama series
1978	Haguregumo	Title picture	
