= Ippei Kuri =

Japanese manga artist and businessman (1940–2023)

- 九里一平
- Born: Toyoharu Yoshida; January 1, 1940; Kyoto, Japan
- Died: July 1, 2023 (aged 83)
- Notable work: Science Ninja Team Gatchaman
- Relatives: Tatsuo Yoshida (brother); Kenji Yoshida (brother)
- Website: ippei2012.blog.fc2.com blog.livedoor.jp/fg356b79ab/

Toyoharu Yoshida (Japanese: 吉田豊治, Hepburn: Yoshida Toyoharu; January 1, 1940 – July 1, 2023), better known as Ippei Kuri (九里一平, Kuri Ippei), was a Japanese manga artist and the third president of animation production company Tatsunoko Production.

== History ==
Ippei Kuri was born Toyoharu Yoshida on January 1, 1940, in Kyoto. As a child, he read comics such as Superman that were discarded by American troops stationed in Japan during the Allied occupation following World War II. Kuri stated he wanted to make a manga like that when he grew up. This had an influence on his manga and anime character design style. He attended Kyoto Municipal Rakuyō High School (now Kyoto Municipal Rakuyō Technical High School), but left in 1958 before graduating to join his older brother Kenji in Tokyo to work as a manga artist.

Kuri worked as an assistant for his older brother Tatsuo, who was already a successful illustrator and manga artist. Kuri made his manga debut in 1959 with Abare Tengu (あばれ天狗; lit. Raging Crow Goblin), published as an akahon and in the Japanese magazine Z-Boy from Shueisha. From 1960 to 1961, Kuri worked on Mach Sanshirō (マッハ三四郎, Mahha Sanshirō) with creator Minoru Kume. In 1962, Kuri co-founded the animation production company Tatsunoko Production with his brothers, Kenji and Tatsuo. Thereafter, he worked in many roles, including as an animation producer, in planning and design, and as a director.

Kuri was appointed the managing director of Tatsunoko Production subsidiary Anime Friend in 1977. In 1987, due to his brother Kenji's retirement, Kuri became the president of Tatsunoko Production. Anime Friend was dissolved in 1990. When Tatsunoko Production became a subsidiary of the major toy manufacturer Takara on July 1, 2005, Kuri stepped down as president. The Yoshida brothers' involvement in the company then became very limited.

At the 10th Animation Kobe event in October 2005, Kuri was awarded the special award for lifetime contributions to anime as a general producer at Tatsunoko Production. Kuri served as a guest professor at the Kyoto University of Arts and Crafts.

Ippei Kuri died on July 1, 2023, at the age of 83. His family held a private funeral on July 10.

== Works ==
Listed in chronological order.

=== Manga ===
- Mach Sanshirō (マッハ三四郎, Mahha Sanshirō) with Minoru Kume (1960–1961)
- Heaven's Oath (大空のちかい, Ōzora no Chikai) (1962–1964, Weekly Shōnen Sunday, Shueisha)
- Judo Boy (ジュードー・ボーイ) (co-writer, 1961–1962, Shōnen Book, Shueisha)
- Bullet Boy (弾丸児, Danganji) (1967–1968, Weekly Shonen Sunday, Shueisha)
- Judo Boy (紅三四郎) (illustrator, 1968–1969, Weekly Shōnen Sunday and Weekly Shōnen Jump, Shueisha)
- Fighter Ken (ファイター健, Faitā Ken)
- Oath of Allah (アラーの誓い, Arā no Chikai)
- Submariner 8823 (海底人8823, Kaiteijin Hayabusa)
- Underwater Boys' Team (海洋少年隊, Kaiyō Shōnentai)
- Messenger of Allah (Bōken-Ō, Akita Shoten)
- Concentrated Darkness: Tsubanari Kenshirō, Ghost Killer (暗闇同心 鍔鳴剣屍郎 怨霊斬り, Kurayami Dōshin Tsubanari Kenshirō Onryōkiri)

=== Anime ===
- Space Ace (1965–1966, planning, script, executive producer, character designer, animation director)
- Speed Racer (1967–1968, executive producer)
- Judo Boy (1969, creator, series director, executive producer)
- The Adventures of Hutch the Honeybee (1970–1971, executive producer, series director)
- Animentary: Determination (アニメンタリー 決断, Animentarī Ketsudan) (1971, series director, executive producer, animation director, key animator)
- Pinocchio: The Series (1972–1973, executive producer)
- Science Ninja Team Gatchaman (1972–1974, producer)
- Demetan Croaker, The Boy Frog (1973, producer)
- Casshan (1973–1974, producer)
- New Honeybee Hutch (1974, producer)
- Tekkaman: The Space Knight (1975, producer, executive producer)
- Time Bokan (1975–1976, planning, producer)
- Gowappa 5 Gōdam (1976, executive producer)
- Paul's Miraculous Adventure (1976–1977, producer)
- Temple the Balloonist (1977–1978, executive producer)
- Yatterman (1977–1979, planning, producer)
- Gatchaman II (1978–1979, producer, character designer)
- Gatchaman Fighter (1979–1980, planning, producer)
- Zenderman (1979–1980, planning, producer)
- Gordian Warrior (1979–1981, planning, character designer)
- Muteking, The Dashing Warrior (1980–1981, planning, producer, character designer)
- Rescueman (1980-1981, planning, producer)
- Dash Kappei (1981–1982, planning)
- Golden Warrior Gold Lightan (1981-1982, planning, character design)
- Yattodetaman (1981–1982, planning, producer)
- Gyakuten! Ippatsuman (1982–1983, planning, producer)
- Itadakiman (1983, planning, producer)
- Mirai Keisatsu Urashiman (1983, planning)
- Showa Idiot's Notebook: Style Is #1! (昭和アホ草紙あかぬけ一番!, Shōwa Ahozōshi Akanuke Ichiban!) (1985–1986, planning)
- Doteraman (1986–1987, development)
- Zillion (1987, producer)
- Oraa Guzura Dado (1987–1988, planning)
- The Adventures of Hutch the Honeybee (1989–1990, producer, character design)
- Legend of Heavenly Sphere Shurato (1989–1990, producer)
- Kyatto Ninden Teyandee (1990–1991, general production manager)
- Robin Hood (1990–1992, animation producer)
- Tekkaman Blade (1992–1993, producer)
- Casshan: Robot Hunter (1993, executive producer)
- Time Bokan: Royal Revival (1993–1994, planning, producer)
- The Story of Cinderella (1996, producer)
- Speed Racer X (1997, character development, art director, theme song lyrics, etc.)
- Yobarete Tobedete! Akubi-chan (2001–2002, planning, producer)

=== Books ===
- Kyoto Nights, Yesterday's Memories: The Me from Those Days Is Beckoning (京の夢、明日の思い出—あの頃のぼくに招かれて, Kyo no Yoru, Ashita no Omoide - Anokoro no Boku ni Manekarete) (November 2004, Kodansha, ISBN 4062126508)

Preceded by Kenji Yoshida	President of Tatsunoko Production; 1987–2005	Succeeded by Hiroki Narishima
