= Judo Boy =

Japanese anime television series

- 紅三四郎(くれないさんしろう)
- Genre: Martial arts
- Created by: Tatsuo Yoshida; Ippei Kuri
- Directed by: Ippei Kuri (chief)
- Music by: Nobuyoshi Koshibe
- Opening theme: "Kurenai Sanshirō"; by Katsuhiko Miki (#1–13); and Mitsuko Horie (#14–26)
- Ending theme: "Otoko no Kōya"; by Katsuhiko Miki (#1–13); "Yūhi no Otoko"; by Yuri Shimazaki (#14–26)
- Country of origin: Japan
- Original language: Japanese
- No. of episodes: 26

Production
- Producer: Kenji Yoshida
- Production company: Tatsunoko Production

Original release
- Network: Fuji TV
- Release: April 2 – September 24, 1969

Related
Further information
Manga
Written by	Ippei Kuri; Yutaka Arai
Illustrated by	Tatsuo Yoshida
Published by	Shueisha
Magazine	Shōnen Book
Original run	January 1961 – March 1962
Volumes	1
Manga
Kurenai Sanshirō
Written by	Masato Tenma (Note: Uncredited. Ippei Kuri receives both script and illustration credits for this work.)
Illustrated by	Ippei Kuri
Published by	Shogakukan; Shueisha (reissue)
Magazine	Weekly Shōnen Sunday
Original run	July 28, 1968 – November 17, 1968
Volumes	1 (Note: This volume was reprinted in 2007 by Shueisha in a special edition along with the four chapters written by Tatsuo Yoshida that were published in Weekly Shōnen Jump in 1969 and had never been compiled into a tankōbon volume before.)
Manga
Kurenai Sanshirō
Written by	Tatsuo Yoshida
Illustrated by	Mamoru Uchiyama (Note: Uncredited. Tatsuo Yoshida receives both script and illustration credits for this work.)
Published by	Shueisha
Magazine	Weekly Shōnen Jump
Original run	May 22, 1969 – July 10, 1969

Kurenai Sanshirō (Japanese: 紅三四郎; lit. "Scarlet Sanshiro"), known outside Japan as Judo Boy, is a Japanese anime television series created by Tatsuo Yoshida and his brother Ippei Kuri loosely based on the manga Judo Boy (Japanese: ジュードー・ボーイ, Hepburn: Jūdō Bōi) written by Yutaka Arai and Kuri and illustrated by Yoshida. The series aired on Fuji TV from April 2, 1969, to September 24, 1969, totaling 26 episodes. The series was also followed by two manga adaptations, the first written by Masato Tenma and illustrated by Kuri published in Shogakukan's Weekly Shōnen Sunday from July 28 to November 17, 1968, and a four-chapters series written by Yoshida and illustrated by Mamoru Uchiyama in Shueisha's Weekly Shōnen Jump from May 22 to July 10, 1969.

The series stars a teenage martial artist named Sanshiro (voiced by Ikuo Nishikawa), trained in the Kurenai School of jiu-jitsu and centers around his search for his father's killer. Accompanying Sanshiro is an orphaned boy named Kenbo (voiced by Kenbo Kaminarimon) and his pet dog Boke (voiced by Hiroshi Otake). Sanshiro's only clue to his father's murderer is a glass eye left on the scene of the crime, suggesting that his father's murderer was one-eyed. Thus many of the villains Sanshiro fought during the course of the series were one-eyed or had one eye concealed with an eye-patch.

The second opening theme was performed by Mitsuko Horie (her first) when she was just 12 years old.

== Cast ==
- Ikuo Nishikawa as Sanshiro
- Hiroshi Ōtake as Boke
- Kenbo Kaminarimon as Kenbo
- Kenji Utsumi as the Narrator
- Recurrent voice cast: Fuyumi Shiraishi, Haruko Kitahama, Junpei Takiguchi, Kaneta Kimotsuki, Masako Ikeda, Masashi Amenomori, Rokurō Naya, Seizō Katō, Takeshi Aono
