= Tatsunoko Production =

Japanese animation studio

Tatsunoko Production Co., Ltd.
- Logo used since 2014

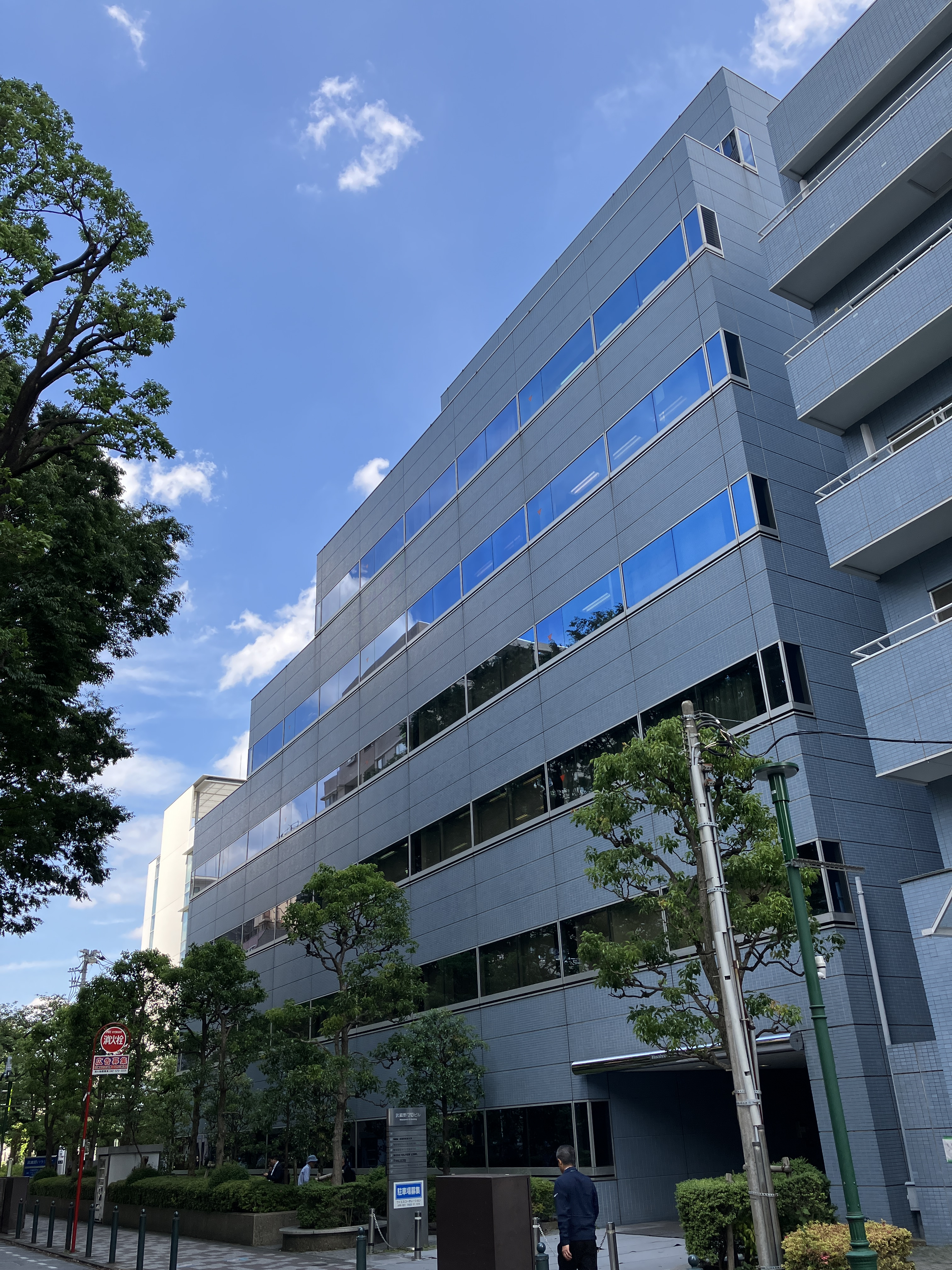
- Headquarters in Musashino, Tokyo
- Native name: 株式会社タツノコプロ (Note: Previously spelled as 株式会社竜の子プロダクション (Kabushiki-gaisha Tatsunoko Purodakushon) from 1962–2013.)
- Romanized name: Kabushiki-gaisha Tatsunoko Puro
- Type: Private KK
- Industry: Animation studio; Character licensing
- Founded: October 19, 1962; 64 years ago
- Founder: Tatsuo Yoshida; Kenji Yoshida; Ippei Kuri
- Headquarters: Nakacho, Musashino, Tokyo, Japan
- Key people: Jun Tokawa (president and CEO)
- Owner: Nippon Television Holdings (55.2%); Takara Tomy (20.0%); Horipro (13.5%); Production I.G (11.2%)
- Number of employees: 113 (2025)
- Divisions: Bakken Record (Note: Bakken Record (stylized in all caps) is the company's internal production label for several of the studio's works.)
- Website: tatsunoko.co.jp

Bakken Record
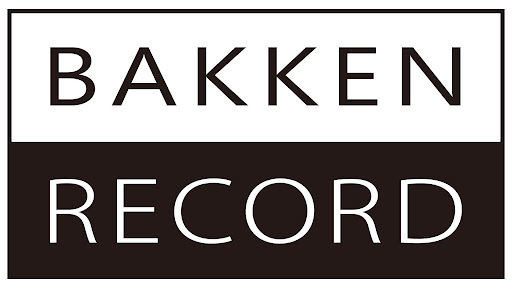
- Product type: Animation production label
- Current owner: Tatsunoko Production
- Country: Japan
- Introduced: 2019; 7 years ago
- Website: bakken-record.jp

Tatsunoko Production Co., Ltd. (Japanese: 株式会社タツノコプロ, Hepburn: Kabushiki-gaisha Tatsunoko Puro; often shortened to Tatsunoko Pro (タツノコプロ, Tatsunoko Puro) and also shortened as TP) is a Japanese animation studio headquartered at the Musaino YS Building in Nakacho, Musashino, Tokyo, Japan. Originally founded on October 19, 1962, by manga author Tatsuo Yoshida and his brothers Kenji Yoshida and Ippei Kuri as a manga studio, three years later the studio entered animation production as it produced its first television series, an original work titled Space Ace. Since then, the studio has produced numerous anime series, such as Speed Racer, Gatchaman, The Genie Family, the Time Bokan series, Samurai Pizza Cats, Pinocchio: The Series, The Adventures of Hutch the Honeybee, and The Littl' Bits, among others. It holds numerous original rights and character copyrights for its original works in Japan and abroad.

The studio is responsible for the planning and production of anime films and television series, as well as character licensing.

The company is one of Japan's leading anime studios in terms of the breadth and richness of its content, ranging from hard action heroes to comedies, science fiction, anthropomorphic animals, and domestic dramas.

Although the company later began producing works set in Japan, since its inception it has essentially aimed to produce works that can be used anywhere in the world in a stateless manner.

In the genealogy of animation studios in the history of Japanese animation, Tatsunoko is known as the studio that created many derivative studios along with Toei Animation, Mushi Production, and Tokyo Movie (currently TMS Entertainment).

In the past, Tatsunoko had a production system in which almost all processes, from planning to scriptwriting, drawing, cinematography, and editing, were completed in-house. The company continued to use this system for a long time after Toei Animation and Mushi Production, which had a similar production system, became unsustainable due to streamlining and bankruptcy. (Note: Mamoru Oshii said that this system was useful for his training as a director.)

Initially, founder Tatsuo Yoshida tried to establish his studio's own style with realistic drawings that accurately depicted muscles and skeletons. At that time, it was common knowledge that animation was to be abbreviated or deformed, and that pictures were to be simplified as much as possible to show movement. Even Mushi Production and Disney used to draw the car so that when it starts, it first contracts like rubber and then jumps out like a bullet due to the recoil, and when it stops, it contracts once due to braking and then extends and returns to its original state. However, Tatsuo Yoshida insisted on realistic animation and produced Mach GoGoGo. For the scene where the car spins, he rented a driving school and had the driver actually demonstrate the spin with the car, and had the animators draw the scene without deforming it by referring to the demonstration. It was so well received that it became the studio's origin and led to subsequent realistic, hard-action works. However, Yoshida's drawings, with their many lines, precision, and sharpness, were unsuitable for animation, which required many drawings of the same picture, and were difficult for other animators to imitate. Most animators refused to participate in the production, and the company's schedule was on the verge of collapse. However, the company was able to get through the busy season when a comedy with a simple design happened to enter the production rotation. This allowed the company to learn how to run a studio that alternated between serious action animation with detailed drawings and comedy animation with simple drawings using deformation, resulting in a wide range of styles.

After 43 years running as an independent studio, an 88% stake of the studio was purchased by Takara on June 30, 2005, a year prior to its merger with Tomy to form Takara Tomy. Nippon Television Holdings, the parent company of Japanese television broadcaster Nippon Television, purchased the studio in a share swap with Tomy in 2014.

The studio's name has a double meaning in Japanese: "Tatsu's child" (Tatsu is a nickname for Tatsuo) and "seahorse", the latter inspiring its logo.

== History ==
The studio was founded in October 1962 by mangaka and anime pioneer Tatsuo Yoshida and his two younger brothers: Kenji, who managed Tatsuo, and manga artist Toyoharu, better known by his pen name "Ippei Kuri", at Tatsuo's house. It initially began as a production company specializing in manga to manage the copyrights of Tatsuo Yoshida's manga and his assistants. However, at the time, the manga artist community was abuzz following the beginning of the broadcast of Astro Boy, Japan's first domestically produced anime television series produced by Osamu Tezuka's Mushi Production. Tatsuo Yoshida became interested in anime production after hearing from Hiroshi Sasagawa, a manga artist who had worked as Tezuka's assistant, (Note: He was Tezuka's first exclusive assistant for his manga, and also had a little experience helping Mushi Production, which was short on staff for animation, by drawing storyboards.) and Tatsunoko set out to produce anime. Tatsuo saw that more people were buying televisions in the early 1960s and predicted that they would demand higher quality anime program in the future, so decided to provide it to them. Around that time, Toei Animation, having heard of Tatsuo's hopes, invited Tatsunoko to produce an anime TV series. It was a good deal for Tatsunoko, which was entrusted with the original story, script, and direction, while Toei worked on the subsequent inbetweening, finishing, cinematography, etc. Toei trained animators over a three-month period, with Tatsunoko staff, including Tatsuo and Sasagawa, also able to participate in training. However, the negotiations broke down due to copyright issues, so Tatsunoko decided to produce an original work on its own. They bought a plot of land in Kokubunji, cleared out a wooded area, and built a prefab house, which became an improvised animation studio. (Note: Toei Animation later produced and broadcast the TV series, now titled Space Kid Jun.) As for animators, Tatsunoko had three manga artists, Tatsuo, Kuri, and Sasagawa, and about 10 assistants to Tatsuo, so they were confident that they could manage. However, most of them refused, saying that they wanted to be manga artists rather than making animation. With no other choice, Tatsunoko placed an advertisement in the newspaper looking for animators and trained 50 amateurs from across the country based on their training experience at Toei. In addition, art director Mitsuki Nakamura from Toei Animation and screenwriter Jinzō Toriumi from Nikkatsu transferred to the company to provide immediate assistance. (Note: Nakamura, in particular, not only drew background art for his main job, but also handled building interiors, designs for automobilis and robots, and everything else that corresponds to live-action stage set or props.) Tatsunoko did not have any experience yet, so they produced a 15-minute pilot and pitched it to TV stations.

In 1965, Tatsunoko's first TV anime series, Space Ace, began broadcasting. The series became popular and successful, and Tatsuo was so pleased with its success that he immediately began work on the next series.

In 1967, Tatsunoko's second TV animation series, Mach GoGoGo, began broadcasting. Not only was it repeatedly reran in Japan, but it was also exported overseas. In the United States, it was dubbed into English and broadcast under the title Speed Racer and became very popular, paving the way for syndication around the world. It was Tatsunoko's first full-color production. At the time, color TVs were not widely available in Japan and most households watched TV programs in black and white. However, Tatsunoko dared to produce the series in full color, assuming from the start that it would be broadcast in the United States. This was due to Tatsuo's desire to move pictures like American comic books and create American-style animation, as well as for financial reasons. The funds from commercial TV stations and sponsors were not enough to cover the production costs, so Tatsunoko decided that the only way to complete the series was to sell it in the United States. They chose car racing as their theme because their target, the U.S., was a car society. However, due to sloppy work by the Japanese intermediaries, Tatsunoko profited little from its worldwide success and received no tribute beyond a mention in the credits of a later live-action film.

In 1972, Science Ninja Team Gatchaman began broadcasting. Tatsuo demanded thorough realism in the works he led. Although the results were excellent, the animators were reluctant to take on the next series because of the increased number of animation cells and the time and effort required to draw them. Tatsunoko therefore recruited and trained new animators and introduced them to this series. The series was a huge hit and related merchandise sold well. Thanks to the copyright income, Tatsunoko was finally on track to recoup its production costs and make a profit. Therefore, from then on, Tatsunoko began to actively introduce mecha in its works for toy manufacturers. Outside of Japan, independent TV program packager Sandy Frank acquired the rights to syndicate Gatchaman worldwide except in Asia. He altered the series by cutting action scenes to meet U.S. broadcast codes, changing the dialogue to take advantage of the popularity of Star Wars and changing the setting of the work to outer space, changing the title to Battle of the Planets. The series was broadcast in the U.S. and around the world, and he profited considerably from its merchandising. However, Tatsunoko did not profit from the series because they gave him the overseas copyrights.

In 1975, Time Bokan, the first entry in the Time Bokan series, began broadcasting. The series, which added an element of comedy to the action that had already become Tatsunoko's signature, lasted for eight years and became a new Tatsunoko masterpiece.

At the time, Hiroshi Sasagawa, who excelled at comedies, and Hisayuki Toriumi, who had a hard, serious style, supported Tatsunoko's heyday in the 1970s as the two signatures. Also during this period, Tatsunoko was trying to bring up university-educated directors in-house, following the example of Toei Doga, instead of hiring directors from outside the company. These people were Mizuho Nishikubo, Kōichi Mashimo, Hidehito Ueda, and Mamoru Oshii.

On September 5, 1977, Tatsuo Yoshida died of liver cancer. Kenji Yoshida was appointed as the second president and would stay on for the studio's later years.

Around the time, Tatsunoko's production site was on the verge of collapse due to busyness and lack of funds, and there was a steady flow of personnel out of the company, particularly members from the pioneering period. (Note: According to Mamoru Oshii, while Tatsunoko, which produced programs for commercial TV stations, limited the number of cels used to less than 3,000 per episode to save budget, the studio established by people who left Tatsunoko produced the program for NHK, Japan's public broadcaster that gave them time to prepare carefully and was properly funded, going on location scouting trips to Northern Europe and using 18,000 cels per episode, even for the same 30-minute program. Hearing this story, the work site was tense. Oshii eventually quit Tatsunoko and joined that studio.)

In 1978, Tatsunoko Anime Technology Research Institute, an animator training institution, was established.

In 1982, Tatsunoko produced Super Dimension Fortress Macross, the first in the Super Dimension series. Macross was a project by Studio Nue that was adopted by Bigwest, an advertising agency, which secured broadcast slots for sponsors and commercial broadcasters. However, Nue was not capable of producing animation, so Artland, which was headed by director Noboru Ishiguro, was assigned to produce the series. However, Artland, a subcontractor, was deemed insufficiently capable, and Tatsunoko took over as the prime contractor, placing orders with Artland and its own subsidiary, Anime Friend. Later, however, Bigwest produced a sequel, Super Dimensional Fortress Macross II: Lovers Again, without Tatsunoko or Studio Nue. In response, Tatsunoko signed a contract with Harmony Gold USA without the consent of Bigwest and Nue, resulting in a dispute over intellectual property rights. In Japan, Tatsunoko sued Bigwest and Studio Nue over copyright and won, but conversely lost a lawsuit filed by them over character and mecha design. As a result of the trial, it was decided that Tatsunoko Productions would retain ownership of the film of the work, but that the designs would be shared by Bigwest and Studio Nue. Meanwhile, overseas, Harmony Gold USA, which had obtained the license, adapted and broadcast several Tatsunoko works as a single epic Robotech series depicting different eras and generations in the same world. Bigwest and Harmony Gold had different claims over the rights to the Macross and Robotech series for many years, and Macross was not developed for business worldwide and Robotech in Japan. However, in 2021, the two companies announced an agreement regarding worldwide rights to the Macross and Robotech series from that point forward. This would allow the Macross series to be developed globally and confirmed that Bigwest did not object to the release of a live-action Robotech movie in Japan. In addition, an exclusive worldwide license outside of Japan to use Macross characters and mecha in the Robotech series approved by Tatsunoko for Harmony Gold through 2021 was ratified. (Note: The international trademark rights for Robotech owned by Harmony Gold were returned to Tatsunoko Production in 2021, and the related products have been discontinued outside Japan.)

In 1987, Kenji Yoshida retired from Tatsunoko Production, and Ippei Kuri became the third president. Kenji established a new production company, Yū Entertainment.

In December of the same year, Mitsuhisa Ishikawa, together with the Tatsunoko Production Branch Office, which consisted mainly of staff who had participated in Zillion, became independent and established IG Tatsunoko Ltd. (now Production I.G). (Note: This capital relationship was temporarily dissolved in 1993, but was revived in 2010 when Production I.G. acquired an 11.2% stake in Tatsunoko Production.)

In 1990, Tatsunoko Anime Technology Research Institute led by Koji Sugii became independent and participated in the establishment of Animation 21.

In 1995, Kenji Yoshida returned to Tatsunoko Production and became its first chairman.

Since the 1990s, Tatsunoko has brought back former key staff members, including Hiroshi Sasagawa, who had left the company, and has been producing mainly remakes of older works.

On June 3, 2005, major toy manufacturer Takara acquired a 88% stake in the studio from the Yoshida family, making the company a consolidated subsidiary of Takara. Following this, Kenji Yoshida and Ippei Kuri resigned from their posts, and the entire Yoshida family, including executives, left the studio.

In the same year, Tatsuo Yoshida was posthumously awarded the Special Achievement Award as one of the 20 People Who Made Japanese Animation at the Tokyo Anime Award held at the Tokyo International Anime Fair.

In 2010, Production I.G. acquired 11.2% of Tatsunoko's outstanding shares. Additionally, Mitsuhisa Ishikawa, president of Production I.G and IG Port, became non-executive director of Tatsunoko Production.

In 2013, Horipro acquired 13.5% of the shares, making it the second largest shareholder at the time after Takara Tomy. In the same year, the company changed its name from Tatsunoko Purodakushon (竜の子プロダクション) (written in kanji) to Tatsunoko Puro (タツノコプロ) (written in katakana). At the same time, the head office was relocated from Kokubunji City, Tokyo to Musashino City, and the dispersed corporate functions were consolidated.

At Anime Expo 2013, Sentai Filmworks announced a deal to license and release some of Tatsunoko's titles, including the Gatchaman series and Casshan in North America.

In 2014, Nippon Television Holdings acquired 54.3% of the outstanding shares held by Takara Tomy and made Tatsunoko Production a subsidiary, structured as a sales swap. Takara Tomy continued to hold a 20% stake in the company and maintained the partnership.

In 2019, Tatsunoko founded a new label, Bakken Record. In the same year, four people associated with Tatsunoko received the Achievement Award at the Tokyo Anime Award: Kunio Okawara, Akiyoshi Sakai, Hisayuki Toriumi, and Tsuneo Ninomiya.

== Main productions ==
Original works that are produced in-house are in bold.

=== Anime television series ===
Year	Title	Series director(s)	Broadcast network(s)	Broadcast Date(s)	Notes	Refs.
1965	**Space Ace**	Hiroshi Sasagawa	Fuji TV	May 8, 1965 – April 28, 1966	Tatsunoko's first ever animated TV serial; adapted from the original manga by Tatsuo Yoshida that was serialized in Shueisha's Shonen Book magazine	
1967	**Speed Racer (Mach GoGoGo)**	Hiroshi Sasagawa	Fuji TV	April 2, 1967 – March 31, 1968	Tatsunoko's first animated TV serial to be produced in color; adapted from the original manga by Tatsuo Yoshida that was serialized in Shueisha's Shonen Book magazine	
1967	**Oraa Guzura Dado**	Hiroshi Sasagawa	Fuji TV	October 7, 1967 – September 25, 1968		
1968	**Dokachin the Primitive Boy**	Seitarō Hara, Hiroshi Sasagawa	Fuji TV	October 2, 1968 – March 26, 1969		
1969	**Judo Boy**	Ippei Kuri	Fuji TV	April 2 – September 24, 1969	Adapted from two manga serials by Tatsuo Yoshida that were serialized in Shueisha's Shonen Book from 1961 to 1962, and Shogakukan's Weekly Shonen Sunday and Shueisha's Weekly Shonen Jump from 1968 to 1969	
1969	**The Genie Family**	Hiroshi Sasagawa	Fuji TV	October 5, 1969 – September 27, 1970	Adapted into Bob in a Bottle by Saban Entertainment in 1992	
1970	**The Adventures of Hutch the Honeybee**	Ippei Kuri	Fuji TV	April 7, 1970 – September 8, 1971		
1970	Inakappe Taishō	Hiroshi Sasagawa	Fuji TV	October 4, 1970 – September 24, 1972	Adapted from the manga by Noboru Kawasaki, which was serialized in Shogakukan's Gakkushu Zasshi educational magazines for Japanese schoolchildren	
1971	**Kabatotto (Hippo and Thomas)**	Hiroshi Sasagawa	Fuji TV	January 1, 1971 – September 30, 1972		
1971	**Animentary: Ketsudan**	Ippei Kuri	Nippon TV	April 3 – September 25, 1971	Dramatic adaptation of the Japanese Empire's role in the Second World War	
1972	**Mokku of the Oak Tree (The Adventures of Pinocchio)**	Seitaro Hara	Fuji TV	January 4, 1972 – January 1, 1973	Adaptation of Italian novelist Carlo Collodi's 1881 novel, The Adventures of Pinocchio	
1972	**Science Ninja Team Gatchaman**	Hisayuki Toriumi	Fuji TV	October 1, 1972 – September 29, 1974	Adapted for western audiences by Sandy Frank Entertainment into Battle of the Planets in 1978, by Sandy Frank and Turner Entertainment into G-Force: Guardians of Space in 1986, and by Saban Entertainment into Eagle Riders in 1996	
1972	**Tamagon the Counselor**	Hiroshi Sasagawa	Fuji TV	October 5, 1972 – September 28, 1973		
1973	**Kerokko Demetan**	Hiroshi Sasagawa	Fuji TV	January 2 – September 25, 1973	Adapted for western audiences by Harmony Gold USA as an animated film The Brave Frog in 1985	
1973	**Neo Human Casshan**	Hiroshi Sasagawa	Fuji TV	October 2, 1973 – June 25, 1974	A notable source of inspiration for Keiji Inafune, who went on to be the artistic director for the Mega Man franchise for Capcom	
1974	**The New Adventures of Hutch the Honeybee**	Seitaro Hara	NET	April 4 – September 27, 1974	Sequel to 1970's Honeybee Hutch	
1974	Urikupen Kyūjotai	Hiroshi Sasagawa, Seitaro Hara	Fuji TV	September 30, 1974 – March 29, 1975	Co-produced with Unimax & MK	
1974	**Hurricane Polymar**	Hisayuki Toriumi	NET	October 4, 1974 – March 28, 1975		
1974	The Song of Tentomushi	Hiroshi Sasagawa	Fuji TV	October 6, 1974 – September 26, 1976	Adapted from Noboru Kawasaki's manga of the same name that was serialized in Shogakukan's Gakkushu Zasshi educational magazines from 1973 to 1975	
1975	**Space Knight Tekkaman**	Hiroshi Sasagawa, Hisayuki Toriumi	NET	July 2 – December 24, 1975		
1975	**Time Bokan**	Hiroshi Sasagawa	Fuji TV	October 4, 1975 – December 25, 1976	First entry in Tatsunoko's Time Bokan Series	
1976	**Gowappa 5 Gōdam**	Hisayuki Toriumi	ABC	April 4 – December 29, 1976		
1976	**Paul's Miraculous Adventure**	Hiroshi Sasagawa	Fuji TV	October 3, 1976 – September 11, 1977		
1977	**The Time Bokan Series: Yatterman**	Hiroshi Sasagawa	Fuji TV	January 1, 1977 – January 27, 1979	Second installment of the Time Bokan Series	
1977	**Ippatsu Kanta-kun**	Hiroshi Sasagawa	Fuji TV	September 18, 1977 – September 24, 1978	First of Tatsuo Yoshida's original works to be produced posthumously; he died of liver cancer on September 5, 1977, 13 days before the first episode aired	
1977	**Temple the Balloonist**	Seitaro Hara	Fuji TV	October 1, 1977 – March 25, 1978	Second and last of Tatsuo Yoshida's original works to be produced posthumously	
1977	Tobidase! Machine Hiryuu	Seitaro Hara	Tokyo Channel 12	October 5, 1977 – March 29, 1978	Co-production with Toei Company, another rare instance where Toei used another studio for its production, rather than its own Toei Animation studio. The only time they would work together with Tatsunoko.	
1978	**Science Ninja Team Gatchaman II**	Hiroshi Sasagawa	Fuji TV	October 1, 1978 – September 23, 1979	Sequel to 1972's Science Ninja Team Gatchaman; adapted into Eagle Riders by Saban Entertainment in 1996; First of Tatsunoko's works to be produced by Kenji Yoshida	
1979	**The Time Bokan Series: Zenderman**	Hiroshi Sasagawa	Fuji TV	February 3, 1979 – January 26, 1980	Third installment of the Time Bokan Series	
1979	**Gordian the Warrior**	Masamune Ochiai, Kunihiko Okazaki	Tokyo Channel 12	October 7, 1979 – February 27, 1981		
1979	**Science Ninja Team Gatchaman Fighter**	Seitaro Hara	Fuji TV	October 7, 1979 – August 31, 1980	Direct sequel to 1978's Science Ninja Team Gatchaman II; final installment in the Gatchaman franchise until 1994 OVA	
1980	**Cheerful Dwarves of the Forest: Belfy and Lillibit**	Masayuki Hayashi	Tokyo Channel 12	January 7 – July 7, 1980	Adapted by Saban Entertainment into The Littl' Bits, which ran on the Nick Jr. Channel from 1991 to 1995	
1980	**The Time Bokan Series: Time Patrol Team Otasukeman**	Hiroshi Sasagawa	Fuji TV	February 2, 1980 – January 31, 1981	Fourth installment of the Time Bokan Series	
1980	**Dashing Warrior Muteking**	Seitaro Hara	Fuji TV	September 7, 1980 – September 27, 1981		
1981	**The Time Bokan Series: Yattodetaman**	Hiroshi Sasagawa	Fuji TV	February 7, 1981 – February 6, 1982	Fifth installment of the Time Bokan Series	
1981	**Golden Warrior Gold Lightan**	Kōichi Mashimo	Tokyo Channel 12	March 1, 1981 – February 18, 1982		
1981	Dash Kappei	Masayuki Hayashi, Seitaro Hara	Fuji TV	October 4, 1981 – December 26, 1982	Adapted from the manga by Noboru Rokuda, which was serialized in Shogakukan's Weekly Shonen Sunday manga magazine from November 1979 to November 1982	
1981	**Superbook**	Masakazu Higuchi	TV Tokyo	October 9, 1981 – March 25, 1982	Produced in conjunction with the Christian Broadcasting Network	
1982	**The Time Bokan Series: Gyakuten! Ippatsuman**	Hiroshi Sasagawa	Fuji TV	February 13, 1982 – March 26, 1983	Sixth installment of the Time Bokan Series	
1982	**The Flying House**	Masakazu Higuchi	TV Tokyo	April 5, 1982 – March 25, 1983	Produced in conjunction with the Christian Broadcasting Network	
1982	Super Dimension Fortress Macross	Noboru Ishiguro	MBS, TBS	October 3, 1982 – June 26, 1983	Adapted by Harmony Gold USA as Robotech: The Macross Saga in 1985. Produced by Studio Nue and Artland	
1983	**Mirai Keisatsu Urashiman**	Kōichi Mashimo	Fuji TV	January 9 – December 24, 1983		
1983	**Superbook II: In Search for Ruffles and Return to the 20th Century**	Masakazu Higuchi	TV Tokyo	April 4 – September 26, 1983	Produced in conjunction with the Christian Broadcasting Network, sequel to Superbook	
1983	**The Time Bokan Series: Itadakiman**	Hiroshi Sasagawa	Fuji TV	April 9 – September 24, 1983	Seventh and final installment of the Time Bokan Series; returned briefly in 1993 as an OVA titled Royal Revival; resumed in 2000 with Kaito Kiramekiman	
1983	**Genesis Climber MOSPEADA**	Katsuhisa Yamada	Fuji TV	October 2, 1983 – March 23, 1984	Adapted by Harmony Gold USA as Robotech: The New Generation in 1985, co-production with Artmic	
1984	**Okawari-Boy StarzanS**	Hidehito Ueda	Fuji TV	January 7 – August 25, 1984	Adapted from an original concept by Hiroshi Sasagawa	
1984	Super Dimension Cavalry Southern Cross	Yasuo Hasegawa	MBS	April 15 – September 30, 1984	Adapted by Harmony Gold USA into Robotech: The Masters in 1985	
1984	Yoroshiku Mechadoc	Hidehito Ueda	Fuji TV	September 1, 1984 – March 30, 1985	Adapted from the manga of the same name by Ryuji Tsugihara, which was serialized in Shueisha's Weekly Shonen Jump manga magazine from November 1982 to March 1985	
1985	Fire of Alpen Rose: Judy and Randy	Hidehito Ueda	Fuji TV	April 6 – October 5, 1985	Adapted from the manga, Alpen Rose, by Michiyo Akaishi, which was serialized in Shogakukan's Ciao manga magazine for female readers from April 1983 to May 1986	
1985	Showa Era Idiot Story Book: Most Refined	Hidehito Ueda	TV Asahi	October 7, 1985 – March 24, 1986	Adapted from the manga of the same name by Yuu Azuki, which was serialized in Shueisha's Margaret manga magazine for female readers from 1985 to 1987	
1986	The Legend of Hikari	Tomomi Mochizuki	ABC	May 3 – September 20, 1986	Adapted from the manga of the same name by Izumi Aso, which was serialized in Shueisha's Ribon manga magazine for female readers from 1985 to December 1988	
1986	**Doteraman**	Shinya Sadamitsu	Nippon TV	October 14, 1986 – February 24, 1987	Tatsunoko's first TV anime to be broadcast on NTV in 15 years since Animentary Ketsudan	
1987	**Red Photon Zillion**	Mizuho Nishikubo	Nippon TV	April 12 – December 13, 1987	After the production of the anime, Tatsunoko Production and Mitsuhisa Ishikawa, the producer of Zillion, established IG Tatsunoko (which later became Production I.G) to obstruct the dispersing of the excellent staffs of Tatsunoko branch which had done actual production. Therefore, Zillion is considered to be Production I.G's first work.	
1987	**Oraa Guzura Dado (1987)**	Hiroshi Sasagawa	TV Tokyo	October 12, 1987 – September 20, 1988	Color remake of the 1967 series	
1989	Legend of Heavenly Sphere Shurato	Mizuho Nishikubo	TV Tokyo	April 6, 1989 – January 18, 1990	Adapted from the manga of the same name by Hiroshi Kawamoto, which was serialized in Shonen Gahosha's Shonen King manga magazine from February to September 1988	
1989	**The Adventures of Hutch the Honeybee (1989)**	Iku Suzuki	Nippon TV	July 21, 1989 – August 31, 1990	Remake of the 1970 anime The Adventures of Hutch the Honeybee	
1990	**Kyatto Ninden Teyandee**	Kunitoshi Okajima	TV Tokyo	February 1, 1990 – February 12, 1991	Adapted into English by Saban Entertainment as Samurai Pizza Cats in 1991; a sequel series known as Kyatto Keisatsu Beranmee (or Crime Stoppin' Cats) was planned, but was mysteriously cancelled for unknown reasons	
1990	**The Great Adventure of Robin Hood**	Kōichi Mashimo	NHK BS2	July 29, 1990 – June 30, 1991	Adapted from the English folktale Robin Hood; also Tatsunoko's first anime to be broadcast on the government-owned NHK network. Co-produced with Mondo TV	
1992	**Space Knight Tekkaman Blade**	Hiroshi Negishi	TV Tokyo	February 18, 1992 – February 2, 1993	1992 reboot of 1975's Space Knight Tekkaman, adapted by Saban Entertainment and Media Blasters into English as Teknoman	
1993	The Irresponsible Captain Tylor	Kōichi Mashimo	TV Tokyo	January 25 – July 19, 1993	Adapted from the light novel series of the same name by Hitoshi Yoshioka, which was serialized in Fujimi Shobo's Fujimi Fantasia Bunko magazines from January 1989 to January 1996	
1994	**The Legend of Snow White**	Tsuneo Ninomiya	NHK BS2	April 6, 1994 – March 29, 1995	Adaptation of the German fairy tale by the Brothers Grimm Co-produced with Mondo TV	
1995	Neon Genesis Evangelion	Hideaki Anno	TV Tokyo	October 4, 1995 – March 27, 1996	Produced by Gainax	
1995	**Dokkan! Robotendon**	Hiroshi Sasagawa	TV Tokyo	October 5, 1995 – March 28, 1996		
1996	**The Story of Cinderella**	Hiroshi Sasagawa	NHK	April 4 – October 3, 1996	Adapted from the fairy tale by Charles Perrault and The Brothers Grimm	
1997	**Mach GoGoGo (1997)**	Hiroshi Sasagawa	TV Tokyo	January 9 – September 25, 1997	1997 reboot of 1967's Mach GoGoGo; adapted into English by DiC Entertainment as Speed Racer X in 2002	
1998	**Generator Gawl**	Seiji Mizushima	TV Tokyo	October 6 – December 22, 1998		
2000	**Time Bokan 2000: Kaitou Kiramekiman**	Hidehito Ueda	TV Tokyo	April 5, 2000 – September 27, 2000		
2001	**The SoulTaker**	Akiyuki Shinbo	WOWOW	April 4, 2001 – July 4, 2001		
2001	**Yobarete Tobidete Akubi-chan**	Hiroshi Sagasawa	TV Tokyo	December 11, 2001 – March 26, 2002	Spin-off of The Genie Family	
2006	**Akubi Girl**	Hiroshi Sagasawa	TV Tokyo	April 2, 2006 – September 30, 2006	Spin-off of The Genie Family Animation production by Studio Ron	
2008	**Yatterman**	Akira Shigino (eps. 1-17); Masakazu Higasa (eps. 18-60)	Yomiuri TV, Nippon TV	January 14, 2008 – September 27, 2009	Reboot of the 1977 television series	
2008	**Mach Girl**	N/A	Kids Station	September 13, 2008 – September 14, 2008	Spin-off of Speed Racer(Mach GoGoGo) Animation production by Studio Ron	
2008	**Casshern Sins**	Shigeyasu Yamauchi	MBS	October 1, 2008 – March 15, 2009	Re-imaging of the 1973 series; Animation production by Madhouse	
2009	Beyblade: Metal Fusion	Kunihisa Sugishima	TV Tokyo	April 5, 2009 – March 28, 2010	Produced by Shogakukan-Shueisha Productions and SynergySP	
2010	**Tachimals Theater**	OKN	Yomiuri TV, Tokyo MX	October 4, 2010 – March 28, 2011		
2011	Sket Dance	Keiichiro Kawaguchi	TV Tokyo	April 7, 2011 – September 27, 2012		
2011	Pretty Rhythm: Aurora Dream	Masakazu Hishida	TV Tokyo	April 9, 2011 – March 31, 2012		
2011	**[C]: The Money of Soul and Possibility Control**	Kenji Nakamura	Fuji TV	April 15, 2011 – June 24, 2011		
2012	Pretty Rhythm: Dear My Future	Masakazu Hishida	TV Tokyo	April 7, 2012 – March 30, 2013	Co-production with DongWoo A&E	
2013	Pretty Rhythm: Rainbow Live	Masakazu Hishida	TV Tokyo	April 6, 2013 – March 29, 2014	Co-production with DongWoo A&E	
2013	Muromi-san	Tatsuya Yoshihara	MBS	April 7, 2013 – June 30, 2013		
2013	**Gatchaman Crowds**	Kenji Nakamura	NTV	July 12, 2013 – September 28, 2013		
2013	Yozakura Quartet: Hana no Uta	Ryochimo Sawa	Tokyo MX	October 6, 2013 – January 1, 2014		
2014	Wake Up, Girls!	Yutaka Yamamoto	TV Tokyo	January 11, 2014 – March 29, 2014	Co-production with Ordet	
2014	Pretty Rhythm: All Star Selection	Masakazu Hishida	TV Tokyo	April 5, 2014 – June 14, 2014		
2014	Ping Pong: The Animation	Masaaki Yuasa	Fuji TV	April 11, 2014 – June 20, 2014		
2014	PriPara	Makoto Moriwaki	TV Tokyo	July 5, 2014 – March 28, 2017	Co-production with DongWoo A&E	
2014	Psycho-Pass 2	Naoyoshi ShiotaniKiyotaka Suzuki	Fuji TV	October 10, 2014 – December 19, 2014		
2015	**Yatterman Night**	Tatsuya Yoshihara	Yomiuri TV, Nippon TV	January 13, 2015 – March 31, 2015		
2015	**Gatchaman Crowds insight**	Kenji Nakamura	Nippon TV	July 5, 2015 – September 26, 2015		
2015	**Peeping Life TV: Season 1??**	Ryoichi Mori	Nippon TV	October 4, 2015 – December 20, 2015	Co-production with FOREST Hunting One, CoMix Wave Films and Tezuka Productions	
2016	**Nurse Witch Komugi R**	Keiichiro Kawaguchi	Nippon TV	January 10, 2016 – March 27, 2016	Spin-off of The SoulTaker	
2016	**Time Bokan 24**	Takayuki Inagaki	Nippon TV	October 1, 2016 – March 18, 2017	Re-imagining of the original Time Bokan anime Produced in collaboration with Level-5	
2017	Idol Time PriPara	Makoto Moriwaki	TV Tokyo	April 4, 2017 – March 27, 2018	Co-production with DongWoo A&E	
2017	Makeruna!! Aku no Gundan!	Takahiko Kyogoku	Tokyo MX	April 5, 2017 – June 21, 2017		
2017	**Infini-T Force**	Kiyotaka Suzuki	Nippon TV	October 3, 2017 – December 26, 2017	Co-production with Digital Frontier	
2017	**Time Bokan: The Villains' Strike Back**	Takayuki Inagaki	Yomiuri TV, Nippon TV	October 7, 2017 – March 24, 2018	Second season of Time Bokan 24 Produced in collaboration with Level-5	
2018	Kiratto Pri Chan	Hiroshi Ikehata	TV Tokyo	April 8, 2018 – May 30, 2021	Co-production with DongWoo A&E	
2019	**The Price of Smiles**	Toshimasa Suzuki	Wowow	January 4, 2019 – March 22, 2019	Tatsunoko's 55th anniversary work	
2019	King of Prism: Shiny Seven Stars	Masakazu Hishida	TV Tokyo	April 16, 2019 – July 2, 2019		
2020	**Genie Family 2020**	Atsushi Nigorikawa	YTV	April 11, 2020 – September 26, 2020	Co-production with Nippon Animation	
2021	**Joran: The Princess of Snow and Blood**	Susumu Kudou	Nippon TV	April 7, 2021 – June 23, 2021	Produced under the Bakken Record label	
2021	Pretty All Friends Selection	Masakazu Hishida	TV Tokyo	June 6, 2021 – September 19, 2021	Co-production with DongWoo A&E	
2021	**Muteking the Dancing Hero**	Ryōsuke Takahashi, Yūzō Satō	TV Osaka	October 3, 2021 – December 19, 2021	Co-production with Tezuka Productions	
2021	Waccha PriMagi!	Junichi Sato, Kosuke Kobayashi	TXN (TV Tokyo)	October 3, 2021 – October 9, 2022	Co-production with DongWoo A&E	
2023	The Legend of Heroes: Trails of Cold Steel – Northern War	Hidekazu Sato	Tokyo MX	January 6, 2023 – March 24, 2023		
2023	Ippon Again!	Ken Ogiwara	TV Tokyo	January 9, 2023 – April 3, 2023	Produced under the Bakken Record label	
2025	**Turkey! Time to Strike**	Susumu Kudo	Nippon TV	July 9, 2025 – September 24, 2025	Produced under the Bakken Record label Co-production with Pony Canyon	
2025	A Gatherer's Adventure in Isekai	Yoshinori Odaka	Tokyo MX	October 7, 2025 – December 22, 2025	co-production with SynergySP	
2026	Pardon the Intrusion, I'm Home!	Itsuki Imazaki	Nippon TV	April 8, 2026 – present		
2026	Red River	Kōsuke Kobayashi	Nippon TV	July 8, 2026 – present		
2027	Welcome to Demon School! Iruma-kun: IruMafia Edition	Keiichiro Kawaguchi	NHK General TV	January 4, 2027 – scheduled		
2027	Giant Ojō-sama	Hiroshi Ikehata	TBA	January 2027 – scheduled		

=== Anime television specials ===
Year	Title	Director	Network	Broadcast Date	Notes	ref
1979	Lupin the Thief: Enigma of the 813	Hiroshi Sasagawa	Fuji TV	May 5, 1979	Loosely adapted from Maurice Leblanc's 813	
1979	Ashinaga Ojisan	Yūichi Higuchi	Fuji TV	October 10, 1979	TV special; adapted from Jean Webster's 1912 novel, Daddy-Long-Legs	
1981	**The Great Navy War: 20,000 Miles of Love**	Ippei Kuri	Nippon TV	January 3, 1981	Loosely adapted from Jules Verne's Twenty Thousand Leagues Under the Seas, adapted into English by Harmony Gold as simply Undersea Encounter	
1999	**Seikimatsu Densetsu: Wonderful Tatsunoko Land**	Hiroshi Sasagawa	TBS	December 31, 1999	TV special	

- Ninja Box (2019–2020; co-production with C2C)
- Idol Land PriPara (2021)
- Exception (Netflix) (2022, co-production with 5 Inc.)
- The Legend of Heroes: Trails of Cold Steel – Northern War (2023)
- Pole Princess!! (2023)
- King of Prism: Dramatic Prism.1 (2024)
- King of Prism: Your Endless Call – Minna Kirameki! Prism☆Tours (2025)

=== Anime films ===
Year	Title	DIrector(s)	Release Date(s)	Notes
1984	Macross: Do You Remember Love?	Noboru Ishiguro, Shōji Kawamori	July 21, 1984	Produced by Studio Nue and Artland
1984	Chikyū Monogatari: Telepath 2500 (Tale of the Earth)	Shigeyuki Yamane	August 4, 1985	Adapted from the novel by Mariko Ohara, Ryou Mizumi and Koh Hiura.
1985	Shonen Jump Special: Kochira Katsushika-ku Kameari Kōen-mae Hashutsujo	Hiroshi Sasagawa	November 23, 1985	Adapted from the manga of the same name by Osamu Akimoto, which was serialized in Shueisha's Weekly Shonen Jump manga magazine from October 1976 to September 2016; presented as a double feature with Shonen Jump Special: Kimagure Orange Road, which was animated by Studio Pierrot
1997	Neon Genesis Evangelion: Death & Rebirth			Co-production with Gainax. "Death"
	**Hutch the Honeybee: Melody of Courage**	Tetsurō Amino	July 31, 2010	Anime film remake of the television series The Adventures of Hutch the Honeybee. Co-production with Group TAC.
	PriPara Mi~nna no Akogare Let's Go PriPari			

=== Original video animations (OVAs) ===
Title	Director(s)	Release Date(s)	Notes
Shurato: Dark Genesis	Yoshihisa Matsumoto	August 1991 – March 1992	Sequel to Legend of Heavenly Sphere Shurato
Casshan: Robot Hunter	Hiroyuki Fukushima, Masashi Abe, Takashi Watanabe	August 21, 1993 – February 21, 1994	1993 remake of 1973's Neo-Human Casshan; co-produced by Artmic and Gainax
Time Bokan: Royal Revival	Hiroshi Sasagawa, Akiyuki Shinbo	November 26, 1993 – January 1, 1994	Direct-to-video installment of Time Bokan Series
Tekkaman Blade II	Hideki Tonokatsu	July 21, 1994 – April 21, 1995	Sequel to 1992's Tekkaman Blade
Gatchaman	Akihiko Nishiyama	October 1, 1994 – April 1, 1995	1994 reboot of 1972's Science Ninja Team Gatchaman; co-produced by Artmic
Hurricane Polymar: Holy Blood	Akiyuki Shinbo	September 21, 1996 – February 21, 1997	1996 reboot of 1974's Hurricane Polymar; co-produced by J.C. Staff
Nurse Witch Komugi	Yasuhiro Takemoto & Yoshitomo Yonetani	August 8, 2002 – April 2, 2004	Co-production with Kyoto Animation; spin-off of The SoulTaker
Karas	Keiichi Sato	March 25, 2005 – August 3, 2007	Tatsunoko's 40th anniversary work; combined into a two-part film in the west by Manga Entertainment
Yozakura Quartet: Hoshi no Umi	Ryochimo Sawa	October 8, 2010 – November 9, 2011	
Princess Resurrection	Keiichiro Kawaguchi	December 9, 2010 – October 7, 2011	
Ippatsu-Hicchuu! Devander	Hiroshi Sasagawa	October 19, 2012	Tatsunoko Productions' 50th anniversary work
Yozakura Quartet: Tsuki ni Naku	Ryochimo Sawa	October 9, 2013 – November 7, 2014	

=== Original net animations (ONAs) ===
Title	Director	Network	Release Date(s)	Notes
Exception	Hirotaka Adachi	Netflix	October 13, 2022	Co-production with Bakken Record and 5 Inc.

=== Video games ===
Title	Genre	Platform(s)	Year	Notes
Simple 1500 Series Vol. 24: The Gun Shooting	On-rails shooter	PlayStation	1999	Animated cutscenes
Tatsunoko Fight	Fighting	PSX	2000	Video game featuring an exclusive character, Denkou Senka Volter.
Fate/stay night	Visual novel	PC	2004	Opening animations
Fate/stay night Réalta Nua	Visual novel	PS2	2007	Opening animations
Tatsunoko vs. Capcom: Cross Generation of Heroes	Fighting	Wii	2008	Opening animation and animated cutscenes.
Tatsunoko vs. Capcom: Ultimate All-Stars	Fighting	Wii	2010	

=== Other productions ===
Title	Year(s)	Type	Notes
Once Upon a Time... Man	1978-79	TV Series	Animation Production Produced by Procidis
Megazone 23	1985	OVA	Additional footage Produced by AIC and Artland
Robotech	1985	TV Series	Co-production with Harmony Gold USA and Big West
Robotech: The Movie	1986	Movie	Co-production with Harmony Gold USA, The Idol Company, Artland and Artmic
Robotech II: The Sentinels	1988	Movie	Co-production with Harmony Gold USA)
Neon Genesis Evangelion	1995-96	TV Series	Co-production with Gainax)
Robotech: The Shadow Chronicles	2007	Movie	Co-production with Harmony Gold USA
Robotech: Love Live Alive	2013	OVA	Robotech version of the MOSPEADA OVA: Love Live Alive
Transformers: Combiner Wars	2016	Web Series	Co-production with Hasbro Studios and Machinima Inc.
Transformers: Titans Return	2017–18	Web Series	Co-production with Hasbro Studios and Machinima Inc.
Transformers: Power of the Primes	2018	Web Series	Co-production with Hasbro Studios and Machinima Inc.

== Co-productions ==
- Genesis Climber MOSPEADA: Love Live Alive (1985; co-production with Artmic)
- Lady Lovely Locks and the Pixietails (1987)
- Super Dimension Fortress Macross: Flash Back 2012 (1987; co-production with Studio Nue and Artland)

== Anime studios founded by former members ==
- Ashi Productions/Production Reed (since 1975)
- Artmic (1978–1997) (defunct)
- Pierrot (since 1979)
- J.C.Staff (since 1986)
- Production I.G (since 1987)
- Animation 21 (since the 1990s) (defunct)
- Xebec (1995–2019) (defunct)
- Radix Ace Entertainment (1995–2006) (defunct)
- Bee Train Production (1997–2012) (dormant)
- Actas (since 1998)
- TNK (since 1999)
- A-Line (since 2000)
- P.A. Works (since 2000)
- Yanchester (since 2024)

== Sources ==
- Sasagawa, Hiroshi (September 1, 2000). Buta mo Odaterya Ki ni Noboru: Watashi no Manga-dō to Anime-dō ぶたもおだてりゃ木にのぼる: 私のマンガ道とアニメ道 [Even pigs will climb trees if you flatter them: My Manga Way and Anime Way]. Wani Books. ISBN 4-8470-1358-1.
