= Tamagon the Counselor =

Japanese anime television series

- かいけつタマゴン
- Created by: Tatsuo Yoshida
- Screenplay by: Jinzō Toriumi; Takao Koyama
- Directed by: Hiroshi Sasagawa
- Music by: Koba Hayashi
- Opening theme: "Kaiketsu Tamagon" by Moon Drops
- Country of origin: Japan
- Original language: Japanese
- No. of episodes: 194

Production
- Production company: Tatsunoko Production

Original release
- Network: FNS (Fuji TV)
- Release: 5 October 1972 – 28 September 1973

Tamagon the Counselor (かいけつタマゴン, Kaiketsu Tamagon), also known as Eggzavier the Eggasaurus, is a Japanese anime television series created by Tatsunoko Production. The series was paired with Hippo and Thomas as part of Tic Tac Toons.

== Synopsis ==
Tatsunoko's description of the series reads as follows: "Tamagon is a cute monster who is fond of eggs. He acts as a counselor to those in trouble, asking only eggs in payment. He goes to work as soon as he has eaten his fee. However, despite his schemes, his service usually ends in failure and he winds up being chased by his irate clients. Short as it is, this program is full of lively laughs and humor."

== Japanese cast ==
- Narrated by Hiroshi Ohtake
- Tōru Ōhira as Tamagon
