= List of Speed Racer chapters =

This is a list of chapters from the manga series Speed Racer, which is called in Japan: Mach GoGoGo. The chapters from Mach GoGoGo were originally published in Shueisha's Shōnen Book. Selected parts of the series were first published in short pamphlet-sized issues by NOW Comics. The first volume of the series was later published by Wildstorm Productions under the title Speed Racer: The Original Manga (ISBN 978-1-56389-686-6). This ceased production just after volume one, which was reprinted by IDW Publishing. The whole series was published by Digital Manga Publishing under the DMP Platinum imprint under the title Speed Racer: Mach Go Go Go.

No.	Original release date	Original ISBN	English release date	English ISBN
1	July 2000	978-4-594-02918-0	2000; February 2008	978-1-56389-686-6
Chapter 1: "The Great Plan" (飛ばせ！マッハ号, "Toba Se! Mahha Gō"); "Speed Racer Arrives!!" "The Fight for the Engine Plans" "Speed Racer's Decision" "Mach-5 Under Attack!" "Speed Racer's Secret Plan": Chapter 2: "Challenge Of the Masked Racer" (謎の覆面レーサー, "Nazo no Fukumen Rēsā"); "The Diabolical Number-9" "The Two-Man Race" "The Alpine Race" "The Double-Up Duo": Chapter 3: "Race for Revenge" (マレンゴの復讐, "Marengo no Fukushū"); Chapter 4: "The Fire Race" (インカ地底レース, "Inka Chitei Rēsu"); "Invitation from Kapetepek" "The Night in Kapetepek" "Into the Core Of the Earth" "Protector Of the Treasure" "Guardian Beast of Kapetepek" "Who is the True Champion?!"
Speed Racer wants to become a professional race-car driver and a man suggests he join their team and race in competitions. Pops Racer was working on a plan for the new engine for the Mach-5 which he has been working on for 25 years. Pops is shown the blueprint to his company, but his other fellow workers don't agree that they should use the engine and Pops quits. Speed Racer rides home with Pops, who is depressed about the disagreement. At home, the Racer family eats dinner wondering what Pops should do for his job. The family thinks that they should renovate and open a repair shop, but they start wondering where they can get the money. Speed goes out to ride in the Mach-5 after dark, passing by Sparky, who he tells Speed about the Sword-Mountain race which has a prize of ¥5,000,000. Speed enters the race to earn money for the renovation.
2	October 2000	—	February 2008	978-1-56389-686-6
Chapter 1: "The True Spirit Of a Racer"; Chapter 2: "The Desperate Desert Race" (死の砂漠レース, "Shino Sabaku Rēsu"); Chapter 3: "The Secret Of The Golden Arrow"; "The Stolen New Element" "The Challenge Of Death!": Chapter 4: "Race to Fire Island"
