= Hutch the Honeybee: Melody of Courage =

- Kanji: 昆虫物語 みつばちハッチ〜勇気のメロディ〜
- Directed by: Tetsurō Amino
- Written by: Bochibochi Uchida; Juri Takeda; Kundō Koyama
- Based on: The Adventures of Hutch the Honeybee by Tatsunoko Production
- Starring: Ayaka Saitō; Ayaka Wilson; Naoki Tanaka; Jun Komori; Eiji Bandō
- Music by: Kōichi Tsutaya
- Production companies: Tatsunoko Production; Group TAC
- Distributed by: Shochiku
- Release date: July 31, 2010
- Running time: 101 minutes
- Country: Japan
- Language: Japanese

Hutch the Honeybee: Melody of Courage (昆虫物語 みつばちハッチ〜勇気のメロディ〜, Konchū Monogatari: Mitsubachi Hatchi: Yūki no Merodī; lit. A Bug's Tale: Hutch the Honeybee: Melody of Courage) is a 2010 Japanese animated film, and a remake of the television series The Adventures of Hutch the Honeybee. The film debuted at number six at the Japanese box office. The film was Group TAC's final production before it closed in August 2010.

== Plot ==
Hutch is a male bee who, along with his friends, begins to find his mother, a queen bee, after bees have been attacked by a group of wasps. Hutch makes friends with several other insects and with Ami, a human girl who can talk to them.

== Voice cast ==
- Ayaka Saitō as Hutch
- Ayaka Wilson as Ami
- Naoki Tanaka as Kunekune
- Jun Komori as Poncho
- Eiji Bandō as Koganenash
