= Dokkan! Robotendon =

Japanese anime television series

ドッカン! ロボ天どん
- Genre: Comedy
- Created by: Tatsunoko Production
- Anime television series
- Directed by: Hiroshi Sasagawa
- Studio: Tatsunoko Production
- Original network: TV Tokyo
- Original run: October 5, 1995 – March 28, 1996
- Episodes: 26

Dokkan! Robotendon (ドッカン! ロボ天どん, Dokkan! Robotendon) is an anime created by Tatsunoko Productions.

== Plot summary ==
Robotendon is a strange robot boy who decides to go to a Japanese restaurant in Tokyo called "Gurugurume", where he proposes to work to pay for every meal he plans on having. Very strong and cute, Robotendon moves at the speed of lightning. His power source is rice. Robotendon plays the central role in this series, along with the Kamada family, the owners of the restaurant, their son, Gratin, and his girlfriend, Salad Nabu.

== Cast ==
- Megumi Hayashibara as Robotendon
- Ikue Ōtani as Tabachuko
- Jin Yamanoi as Ugarlic
- Minami Takayama as Gratin Kamada
- Tomoko Kawakami as Salad Nabu
