= The Adventures of Hutch the Honeybee =

Japanese anime television series

- Key art
- 昆虫物語 みなしごハッチ
- Genre: Adventure
- Created by: Tatsuo Yoshida
- Directed by: Seitaro Hara; Ippei Kuri
- Music by: Nobuyoshi Nishibe
- Opening theme: "Minashi no hatchi" by Yuri Shimazaki
- Ending theme: "Mama o tazunete" by Yuri Shimazaki
- Country of origin: Japan
- Original language: Japanese
- No. of episodes: 91

Production
- Producers: Kenji Yoshida; Tatsuo Yoshida
- Production company: Tatsunoko Production

Original release
- Network: FNS (Fuji TV)
- Release: April 7, 1970 – September 8, 1971

The Adventures of Hutch the Honeybee (昆虫物語 みなしごハッチ, Konchū Monogatari: Minashigo Hatchi; lit. A Bug's Tale: Hutch the Orphan) is an anime series produced by Tatsunoko Production. The series features the adventures of a young bee named Hutch. Son of a Queen bee, Hutch is separated from his mother when his native beehive is destroyed by an attack of wasps. The series follows Hutch as he searches for his missing mother, in the midst of a frequently hostile nature.

A sequel, The New Adventures of Hutch the Honeybee, and numbering 26 episodes, was produced in 1974. The original series was remade in 1989 under the same Japanese title, Minashigo Hutch.

The original show (1971) is notable for its frequently sad and cruel scripts. In many episodes, Hutch would befriend another insect, only to see his new friend die a violent and painful death. In one, he befriended a female honey bee who lost her brothers and sisters to a hornet army. The 1989 remake, however, featured completely new episodes and a much more light-hearted story. On July 31, 2010, a movie which was a remake of show was released in Japan titled Hutch the Honeybee.

After being broadcast in several international countries, the show was re-edited and translated into English in 1994 by Saban Entertainment as Honeybee Hutch, with 65 out of 91 episodes being dubbed. Saban's edits cut out some of the show's violent material.

== Plot ==
The story begins with the queen bee hive being attacked and destroyed by an army of wasps, which kill almost all the bees inside and devour their eggs. The queen bee is forced to flee, but an egg is saved from the terrible slaughter, ending up hidden under a leaf. This egg is then found by a female bumblebee, the queen's handmaid, and taken by her as if it were one of her own. The little Hutch (in the Japanese version Hutch or Hacchi, as the protagonist is originally male, a bee drone) is thus raised by his adoptive mother Bumblebee with love but is despised and isolated by his half-brothers. Upon discovering that he is adopted and feeling like he was never fully accepted, Hutch decides to set out on a journey in search of his mother. Hutch subsequently experiences a great deal of adventures, meeting and befriending various animals such as butterflies, amphibians, mice, other bees, and caterpillars, though many meet tragic ends. Hutch also faces many enemies, such as spiders, toads, ants, wasps, hornets, snakes, moles, predatory birds, reptiles, praying mantises and even humans. During his journey Hutch meets another bee called Aya, who joins him on his search. Eventually Hutch finds his mother and saves her from certain death. He also discovers that Aya is actually his sister, who managed to survive the wasps' attack at the beginning of the story. Hutch and his family rebuild the bee kingdom, vowing to make it peaceful and kind.

== Voice cast ==
- Chieko Honda as Teru
- Haruko Kitahama as Mama
- Junji Chiba as Piccolo
- Masako Nozawa as Bunkichi
- Minoru Midorikawa as Water Scorpion
- Takeshi Watabe as Kamakiri
- Toshiko Sawada as Narrator
- Yoshiko Matsuo as Flower
- Yoshiko Sakakibara as Queen
- Yoshiko Yamamoto as Aya
- Youko Kuri as Hutch
- Yuuko Maruyama as Apachi

== English dub cast ==
- Joshua Seth as Hutch
- Mari Devon as the Narrator
- Edie Mirman as Honey Queen Bee
- Heidi Lenhart as Haley
- Frank Catalano as Hutch's Evil Twin Brother
- Dorothy Elias-Fahn as various voices
- R. Martin Klein as Dan Dan
- Melodee Spevack as Hutch's Mother

== Other foreign versions ==
The original series was broadcast in France, by TF1, and Quebec (Canada) starting in 1979, under the titles Le Petit Prince Orphelin (The little Orphan Prince) and Hutchy le Petit Prince Orphelin. The re-edited Saban version was broadcast in 1997, under the title Micky l'abeille (Micky the bee), with a new French dubbing.

In Italy, the show was broadcast by various local TV channels from 1979 as Le avventure dell'Ape Magà (The Adventures of Magà the Bee), with a dub derived from the original Japanese version. In the Italian dubbing, the male character of Hutch was turned into a female bee, which created some awkward moments in the translations, such as in the episode which depicts Hutch falling in love with a female butterfly. The Italian dialogue sometimes left the character's gender unclear, generating some confusion. In 1997 a new dub, derived from the American version, aired on Italia 1 under the title Un alveare d'avventure per l'Ape Magà (A Hive of Adventures for Magà the Bee). In the second dub the gender of the main character is male, despite the name still being Magà.

The show was also broadcast in Spain by the television network Telecinco.

The show was fully dubbed to Arabic in 1984 by G.C.C Joint Program Production Institution, which based in Kuwait.

In Latin America, the show was broadcast as Josemiel in the 1980s, for Mexico, the original edition was sent in 1984 to be transmitted by Televisa and Canal 6, got a lot of appreciation by their fans due to the dramatic script and the not-translated Japanese intro and ending. Some years later, the remake named Las Aventuras de Hutch were transmitted also by Televisa, but as being adapted from the American version of the animation it got less popularity than the original series. In Brazil, it was broadcast by Rede Globo.

In Israel, it was broadcast in 1997 on Arutz HaYeladim as רון הדבורון (Ron HaDvoron; Ron the Little Bee).

In Philippines, it was featured as a TV Series with title "Hutch, Ang Batang Bubuyog", "Hutch, The Kiddie Bee".

In Germany, the series was named Flitz das Bienenkind (Flitz the bee child). The German dub was produced by Saban in 1994 and was based on the US dub. The original 91 episodes were cut together for a total of 65 episodes. The series premiered on ARD on 29 December 1996.

== International Broadcast ==
- Central and Eastern Europe
  - Fox Kids CEE (1999-2003)
  - Fox Kids Poland (1998-2001)
- Japan
  - Fuji TV
  - Cartoon Network
- Australia
  - Network Ten
  - Nickelodeon
- United Kingdom
  - Fox Kids UK
- United States
  - girlzChannel
  - Syndication
  - Boomerang
- Iran
  - IRIB
- Indonesia
  - SCTV (1997-2001)
  - TV7 (2002-2004)
  - Spacetoon (2005-2011; 2020)
  - Rajawali Televisi (2018; 2021)
- Philippines
  - TV5 - Dubbed in Tagalog with the title, Hutch ang Batang Bubuyog (Hutch the Young Bee)
- Bahrain
  - Bahrain TV
- Italy
  - Syndication
- South Korea
  - KBS1
  - Nickelodeon
- Thailand
  - CH.7 BW (CH.5 COLOR)
- Germany
  - Das Erste
  - KiKa

== Episodes ==
This is a list of episodes from the television show Honeybee Hutch in order by production number.

No.	Title	Original release date
1	"Make runa hacchi" (負けるなハッチ)	April 7, 1970
2	"Ike ike hacchi" (行け行けハッチ)	April 14, 1970
3	"Kanashi ki taiketsu" (悲しき対決)	April 21, 1970
4	"Samuraiari no shūgeki" (サムライアリの襲撃)	April 28, 1970
5	"Tobe yominikuki tenshi" (飛べよみにくき天使)	May 5, 1970
6	"Naku na hacchi" (泣くなハッチ)	May 12, 1970
7	"Mama to yobi taino" (ママと呼びたいの)	May 19, 1970
8	"Kizu darakeno barerina" (傷だらけのバレリーナ)	May 26, 1970
9	"Tatakae yowamushi yarō (mae)" (闘え弱虫野郎（前）)	June 2, 1970
10	"闘え弱虫野郎（後）" (Tatakae yowamushi yarō (nochi))	June 9, 1970
11	"坊や泣かないで" (Bōya naka naide)	June 14, 1970
12	"Yasashiki mayu musume" (やさしき繭娘)	June 23, 1970
13	"Tōka yoitsumademo" (灯火よいつまでも)	June 30, 1970
14	"Namida koraete" (涙こらえて)	July 7, 1970
15	"Hana no mitsubachi musume" (花のミツバチ娘)	July 14, 1970
16	"Hanazono no abarenbō" (花園の暴れん坊)	July 21, 1970
17	"Yūyake ni naru kane" (夕焼けに鳴る鐘)	July 28, 1970
18	"Meguriaino komoriuta" (めぐりあいの子守唄)	August 4, 1970
19	"Warumono janainda" (悪者じゃないんだ)	August 11, 1970
20	"Dai bora taishō no bōken" (大ぼら大将の冒険)	August 18, 1970
21	"Hani no tsurugi" (ハニーの剣)	August 25, 1970
22	"Nikushimi yosayōnara" (憎しみよさようなら)	September 1, 1970
23	"Garasu no nakano mama" (ガラスの中のママ)	September 8, 1970
24	"Umi wo mita kagerō" (海を見たカゲロウ)	September 15, 1970
25	"Rō hei suzumebachi" (老兵スズメバチ)	September 22, 1970
26	"Suzu mushi hamō naka nai" (スズ虫はもう鳴かない)	September 29, 1970
27	"Nusuma reta ōji" (盗まれた王子)	October 6, 1970
28	"Naku na arin" (鳴くなアーリン)	October 13, 1970
29	"Kono sora nodokokani" (この空のどこかに)	October 20, 1970
30	"Taiyō no mama" (太陽のママ)	October 27, 1970
31	"Hiroi sekai ga yon deiru" (広い世界が呼んでいる)	November 3, 1970
32	"Hitoribocchino kuma ō" (ひとりぼっちの熊王)	November 10, 1970
33	"Honoo no nakano inochi" (炎の中のいのち)	November 17, 1970
34	"Eikō no ari tsuka (mae)" (栄光のアリ塚（前）)	November 24, 1970
35	"Eikō no ari tsuka (nochi)" (栄光のアリ塚（後）)	December 1, 1970
36	"Ai no konsato" (愛のコンサート)	December 8, 1970
37	"Sayonara kodomotachi" (さよなら子供達)	December 15, 1970
38	"Yuzuri ha no uta" (ゆずり葉の歌)	December 22, 1970
39	"Papa to mama no shinjitsu" (パパとママの真実)	December 29, 1970
40	"Yūki womotte tachiaga re" (勇気をもって立ち上がれ)	January 5, 1971
41	"Jūnihiki no kodomotachi" (十二匹の子供達)	January 12, 1971
42	"Soredemo tobu nda" (それでも飛ぶんだ)	January 19, 1971
43	"Kanashimi ha mama dake" (悲しみはママだけ)	January 26, 1971
44	"Ame noo tama ga ike" (雨のお玉が池)	February 2, 1971
45	"Arashi no nakano yūjō" (嵐の中の友情)	February 9, 1971
46	"Tobe yo hacchi" (飛べよハッチ)	February 14, 1971
47	"Bokujō no shiro" (牧場の城)	February 23, 1971
48	"Yami ni hikaru namida" (闇に光る涙)	March 2, 1971
49	"Yuki yama nokanatani" (雪山のかなたに)	March 9, 1971
50	"Mori no ninja mushi (mae)" (森の忍者虫（前）)	March 16, 1971
51	"Mori no ninja mushi (nochi)" (森の忍者虫（後）)	March 23, 1971
52	"Yō in no mushi yarō" (陽陰の虫野郎)	March 30, 1971
53	"Ma no mushikui kusa" (魔の虫食い草)	April 6, 1971
54	"Mama ha umi no kanata ni" (ママは海の彼方に)	April 13, 1971
55	"Hitoribocchino sanbiki" (ひとりぼっちの三匹)	April 20, 1971
56	"Yuki yama no taiyō" (雪山の太陽)	April 27, 1971
57	"Minami no kuni no komoriuta" (南の国の子守唄)	May 4, 1971
58	"Chichi no hoshi. haha no hoshi" (父の星・母の星)	May 11, 1971
59	"Kanashi i yūjō" (悲しい友情)	May 18, 1971
60	"Taikai no ichiyō" (大海の一葉)	May 25, 1971
61	"Utsukushi ki seimei" (美しき生命)	June 1, 1971
62	"Shiawase ha mama no negai" (幸せはママの願い)	June 8, 1971
63	"Sokonuke sanbiki no mushi yarō" (底抜け三匹の虫野郎)	June 15, 1971
64	"Mō hitori no mama" (もう一人のママ)	June 22, 1971
65	"Moe ro asayake" (燃えろ朝焼け)	June 29, 1971
66	"Kanashi ki boshi kusa" (悲しき母子草)	July 6, 1971
67	"Itsuwarino hanazono" (いつわりの花園)	July 13, 1971
68	"Maboroshino kyūketsuki" (まぼろしの吸血鬼)	July 20, 1971
69	"Ai no uragiri mono" (愛の裏切り者)	July 27, 1971
70	"Utsukushi kiikenie" (美しきいけにえ)	August 3, 1971
71	"Ai no taiketsu" (愛の対決)	August 10, 1971
72	"Hacchi kokyō ni kaeru" (ハッチ故郷に帰る)	August 17, 1971
73	"Yūyake no kyōdai" (夕焼けの兄妹)	August 24, 1971
74	"Wasure na kusa ni negai wokomete" (忘れな草に願いをこめて)	August 31, 1971
75	"Ai ha tatakai no hate ni" (愛は戦いの果てに)	September 7, 1971
76	"Mori ha yon deiru" (森は呼んでいる)	September 14, 1971
77	"Habatake oyako chō" (はばたけ親子蝶)	September 21, 1971
78	"Shino ike karano dasshutsu" (死の池からの脱出)	September 28, 1971
79	"Kagayake ru seimei" (輝ける生命)	October 5, 1971
80	"Papa hahitoribocchi" (パパはひとりぼっち)	October 12, 1971
81	"炎の中のママ" (Papa hahitoribocchi)	October 19, 1971
82	"Namida no naka dearigatō" (涙の中でありがとう)	October 26, 1971
83	"Tobe! mama wo shinji te" (飛べ!ママを信じて)	November 2, 1971
84	"Gohiki no suzumebachi yarō" (五匹のスズメバチ野郎)	November 9, 1971
85	"Ikari no ya" (怒りの矢)	November 16, 1971
86	"Hacchi nitsuduke" (ハッチにつづけ)	November 23, 1971
87	"Takumashiki haha no ai" (たくましき母の愛)	November 30, 1971
88	"Mama ha namida nokanatani (mae)" (ママは涙のかなたに（前）)	December 7, 1971
89	"Mama ha namida nokanatani (nochi)" (ママは涙のかなたに（後）)	December 14, 1971
90	"Mama ni daka rete (mae)" (ママに抱かれて（前）)	December 21, 1971
91	"Mama ni daka rete (nochi)" (ママに抱かれて（後）)	December 28, 1971
