= Temple the Balloonist =

Japanese anime television series

- Cover art from the first volume of the DVD release
- 風船少女テンプルちゃん
- Genre: Family, Drama, Adventure
- Created by: Tatsunoko Production Planning Office
- Directed by: Seitarō Hara
- Music by: Nobuyoshi Koshibe
- Country of origin: Japan
- Original language: Japanese
- No. of episodes: 26

Production
- Executive producers: Tatsuo Yoshida; Kenji Yoshida
- Producer: Matsatugu Nagai
- Editors: Reiko Toda; Sachiko Miki
- Production companies: Fuji Television; Tatsunoko Production

Original release
- Network: FNS (Fuji TV)
- Release: 1 October 1977 – 25 March 1978

Temple the Balloonist (風船少女テンプルちゃん, Fūsen Shōjo Tenpuru-chan; lit. Balloon Girl Temple) is an anime created by Tatsunoko Production.

== Plot ==
Temple is a lovely little girl who is more fond of music than anything else. She happens to board a balloon one day, and is excited by her journey until she is caught in a sudden storm and is blown away from her parents and home. She is in tears until she meets a drummer boy named Tam-Tam accompanied by animal friends who also play musical instruments. Joined by these new friends who play music to keep up her spirits, Temple sets out to find her way home and she finds love with the drummer boy.

One of the final works credited to Tatsunoko Production co-founder Tatsuo Yoshida, who died in September 1977 shortly before the TV series premiered, it is widely believed that the curly-haired heroine of this series was named after Shirley Temple (indeed, Temple was renamed to Shirley in the French dub). The series was a success throughout Europe and Latin America in the 1980s under several differing titles, including Temple e Tam Tam (Italian), Shirley la petite fille en ballon (French), and Sabrina y sus amigos (Spanish). Harmony Gold attempted to produce an English dub to sell to the American market under at least two different titles - Sabrina's Journey and Tiffany's Traveling Band - but Temple the Balloonist has never been released in English.

== Characters ==
- Temple Farmer (Sabrina in Latin Spanish)(voiced by Kumiko Takizawa) is an adorable little girl who loves music and dance, wears a red majorette's outfit and loves to twirl her baton. While taking a balloon ride with Fuwatto, she is whisked far away from home by a sudden storm and tries to find her way home, accompanied by her traveling band. She comes from a wealthy family and is somewhat spoiled and indulged by her parents, but matures as her journey continues.
- Tomtom (Tamborin in Latin Spanish) (voiced by Noriko Tsukase) is a drummer boy who was working for an abusive boss in a traveling musical troupe, but manages to escape with Temple's help. He becomes Temple's companion on her journey and, by the end of the story, something of a love interest.
- Dora (voiced by Kenichi Ogata) is a "doraneko" ("stray cat") who plays his whiskers like a string instrument.
- Gappe (voiced by Kaneta Kimotsuki) is a duck who plays his beak like a trumpet.
- Chuppi (voiced by Yoko Yano) is a mouse and the flautist of Temple's traveling musical troupe.
- Fuwatto (Nimbo) (voiced by Yuko Hisamatsu) is a cloud boy who can modify his body into shapes resembling various musical instruments, including horns and cymbals.
- Jimmy Farmer (voiced by Ryuji Nakagi) is Temple's father.
- Marie Farmer (voiced by Keiko Tomochika) is Temple's mother.
- Boss (voiced by Masao Imanishi) is Tomtom's abusive boss, from whom he escapes in episode one. He re-appears in episode nine, but Tam-Tam manages to escape from him again. He has two unnamed henchmen (voiced by Ryuji Nakagi and Masanobu Okubo).
- The Narrator is Ikuko Tani.

== Episodes ==
No.	Title	Original release date
1	"Lost Child Balloon" "Mayoigo Fūsen" (まよいご風船)	1 October 1977
Temple and her parents go to town and Temple is allowed to pick out something to buy, she chooses a Majorette outfit that comes with a baton which she wears when they play music together after returning home. Their music attracts the attention of a young cloud named Fuwatto who explores the house and offers to take Temple for a ride in a hot air balloon, however during their ride the balloon becomes caught in a storm which blows Temple far away from home. The next day they've landed safely in a field where a boy named Tam-Tam and his three animal friends: Chuppi the Mouse, Doora the Cat, & Gappe the Duck are fleeing from their abusive masters. They manage to escape in the balloon but Temple begins to cry as they're likely drifting further away from home, the others begin to play music to cheer her up and she begins singing along with them.
2	"Friendship in the Rain" "Ame no Naka no Yūjō" (雨の中の友情)	8 October 1977
After landing near a town Tam-Tam & his animal friends part ways with Temple & Fuwatto as they have to go work to earn money for food, Temple doesn't know what working is but asks Fuwatto to let her take a closer look when she sees her friends playing music for tips. However a couple of men try to trick Tam-Tam & company out of their earnings, though the four realise right away the men are not to be trusted Temple is much more sheltered and is grabbed by one of the men who tries using her as a hostage in exchange for the money. Though they manage to get away they lose the money and have to stay in an abandoned cabin & eat some of their rations; at first Temple refuses to eat the apple she's offered but eventually eats it after the others explain that they can't do any better. Later on Temple & Fuwatto prepare to leave again Tam-Tam insists that he and his friends can't join her because they live in such different worlds, however the four of them rush to find her after a storm starts, which also damages the balloon. They manage to take shelture in a hollow tree, however Temple has a high fever and is frightened by the storm, Tam-Tam begins to play music for her and the others follow suit, which allows her to wake up for a moment and tell them that she won't give up as long as they're with her. The group continues playing music until the storm ends and they can search for help.
3	"The Song of Saffron" "Safuron no Uta" (サフランの詩(うた))	15 October 1977
Tam-Tam and the others carry Temple, who has a high fever from the rain in the previous episode, to an occupied cottage Fuwatto found; however the owner refuses to let them in and claiming her hates children, though he quickly changes his mind when he hears a little girl is in danger. He puts Temple in a bed and yells at the others for letting her get so sick & sends them to get some ice from a nearby mountain for a coolant, though this and playing music for her helps she's still gravely sick and the old man continues to be short tempered and eventually admits he wasn't always this way; his Granddaughter used to live with him and the two were very happy together, however when her Mother was able to care for her again she took her back with her and left him completely alone. When Temple's condition worsens the Old Man tells the others that the only possible cure is the Saffron flowers that grow in the mountains but it's too cold for them to go searching for them, Tam-Tam & the others head out in search of them with Fuwatto being able to bring them strait to the flowers in the balloon. However while they're picking the flowers a giant hawk appears and chases them, meanwhile Temple briefly wakes up but her condition is still worsening and the old man resolves to do his best to save the girl as well. When the hawk damages the balloon the old man shows up just in time and shoots it which causes an avalanche, everyone manages to dig him out, return him home in the basket, and cure Temple but now the old man is gravely ill. Though he doesn't care if he survives Temple & the others begin playing music for him and he quickly recovers and happily sees them off, having been changed by meeting them.
4	"Gondola Shanty" "Gondora no Funauta" (ゴンドラの舟唄)	22 October 1977
While traveling everyone falls asleep causing the balloon to crash and become separated from the basket, they spot a gondola and climb aboard. The man on board thinks they're thieves, but his wife instantly welcomes them, prepares a meal for them and allows Temple to wear some of their daughter's old clothes; though Temple enjoys her hospitality Tam-Tam has trouble accepting it and feels they are imposing on the couple. Meanwhile Fuwatto has been searching for the balloon but cannot find it, later the wife finds the balloon but hides it in the hold so the children will stay resulting in a moment of panic later when Tam-Tam and his animal friends offer to clean the hold to repay her kindness. Over the next few days they travel together and ask about the balloon everywhere they go, the husband begins to warm up to the children, Tam-Tam enjoys having something like the family life Temple has enjoyed, Temple is the happiest she's been since the journey began, and their friends are enjoying life on the Gondola. However, while the animals are cleaning the hold they find the balloon and show it to the children who are shocked to find it there, the wife then tearfully admits that she had been hiding it because having them there allowed her to recapture part of what she lost when her own daughter fell in the river many years ago. Although this kept her away from her parents, Temple understands the woman's feelings and the two embrace as they cry for the family they miss. The next day the couple sees the group off as they play music accompanied by the shanty the man taught Tam-Tam earlier.
5	"Wolf Forest" "Ōkami no Mori" (オオカミの森)	29 October 1977
6	"Green Grass Village of my Dreams" "Yume no Wakakusa-mura" (夢の若草村)	5 November 1977
7	"Baton, Join Our Hearts" "Takuto yo Kokoro o Tsunage" (タクトよ心をつなげ)	November 12, 1977
8	"Violinist Girl" "Baiorin no Shōjo" (バイオリンの少女)	November 19, 1977
9	"The Rhythm That Binds Our Dreams" "Yume o Musubu Rizumu" (夢を結ぶリズム)	November 26, 1977
10	"The Hungry Music Troupe" "Harapeko Ongaku-tai" (はらぺこ音楽隊)	December 3, 1977
11	"Doora's Heart" "Dōra no Koi" (ドーラの恋)	December 10, 1977
12	"Temple Becomes a Hostage" "Hitojichi ni Natta Tenperu" (人質になったテンプル)	December 17, 1977
13	"Piyo Piyo March" "Piyo Piyo Kōshinkyoku" (ピヨピヨ行進曲)	December 24, 1977
14	"Sammy's Balloon" "Samī no Fūsen" (サミーの風船)	December 31, 1977
15	"Temple Becomes A Mama" "Mama ni Natta Tenperu" (ママになったテンプル)	January 7, 1978
16	"Rosanna The Crybaby" "Nakimushi Rosanna" (泣きむしロザンナ)	January 14, 1978
17	"Gypsy's Fortune Telling" "Jipushī no Uranai" (ジプシーのうらない)	January 21, 1978
18	"Pink Tellina Girl" "Sakura-gai no Shōjo" (さくら貝の少女)	January 28, 1978
19	"The Migratory Bird of the Angel Statue" "Tenshi-zō no Wataridori" (天使像の渡り鳥)	February 4, 1978
20	"The Flying Person" "Soratobu Ningen" (空飛ぶ人間)	February 11, 1978
21	"The Parent & Child of the Snowy Mountain" "Yukiyama no Oyako" (雪山の親子)	February 18, 1978
22	"The Baby Dolphin's Sea" "Chibikko Iruka no Umi" (チビッコイルカの海)	February 25, 1978
23	"Temple Rides The Train" "Kisha ni Notta Tenperu" (汽車に乗ったテンプル)	March 4, 1978
24	"Temple's Fireworks" "Tenperu no Hanabi" (テンプルの花火)	March 11, 1978
25	"A Guidepost For Two" "Futari no Michishirube" (ふたりの道しるべ)	March 18, 1978
26	"Papa & Mama of Green Grass Village" "Wakakusa-mura no Papa to Mama" (若草村のパパとママ)	March 25, 1978
