= Paul's Miraculous Adventure =

Japanese anime television series

- ポールのミラクル大作戦
- Genre: Fantasy, Isekai
- Created by: Tatsunoko Production Planning Office
- Directed by: Hiroshi Sasagawa
- Music by: Shunsuke Kikuchi
- Opening theme: "Paul no boken" by Kumiko Ōsugi and Columbia Yurikago Kai
- Ending theme: "Okaruto hanmā no uta" by Kumiko Ōsugi and Columbia Yurikago Kai
- Country of origin: Japan
- Original language: Japanese
- No. of episodes: 50

Production
- Executive producer: Tatsuo Yoshida
- Producers: Ippei Kuri; Masaru Shibata; Masatsugu Nagai
- Production companies: Tatsunoko Production; Fuji Television

Original release
- Network: FNS (Fuji TV)
- Release: October 3, 1976 – September 11, 1977

Paul's Miraculous Adventure (ポールのミラクル大作戦, Pōru no Mirakuru Daisakusen; also known as "Paul's Miracle Strategy Plan") is an action-adventure anime television series created by Tatsunoko Production. The series was broadcast on Fuji TV and other FNS stations across Japan from October 3, 1976, to September 11, 1977, and lasted 50 half-hour episodes. The series director was Hiroshi Sasagawa, of Speed Racer and Tokimeki Tonight fame.

== Story ==
On his birthday, Paul receives a stuffed animal as a gift from his parents. While Pakkun appears to be a fairly ordinary stuffed toy, he in reality is the keeper of the portal between Earth and an alternate dimension known as the Land of Wonders. Paul and his best friend Nina explore the alternate universe until Nina is kidnapped by the demonic ruler of this dimension, Belt Satan. After making an unsuccessful attempt to save Nina, Paul and Pakkun are forced to return home to Earth, where Paul is confronted by Nina's parents, who blame him for her disappearance and accuse him of murdering her. Paul returns to the Land of Wonders with Pakkun and Nina's St. Bernard dog Doppe in tow, fighting monsters with his powerful yo-yo in order to defeat Belt Satan and save Nina.

== Distribution ==
The series has been dubbed into several other languages including Italian (as Il fantastico mondo di Paul, 1980), Spanish (as Las aventuras de Paul), Korean, Polish (as Fantastyczny świat Paula), Bulgarian (as Вълшебният Свят на Пол) and in English in the Philippines (as Paul in Fantasy Land).

In the late 1980s, Saban Entertainment planned to produce an English dub of the series titled Pauly's Mad Mad World. The dub was never released. The series began streaming in Japanese with English subtitles on Hidive in the United States and Canada on June 30, 2026.

== Staff ==
- Director: Hiroshi Sasagawa
- Episode Direction: Mizuho Nishikubo, Hidehito Ueda
- Screenwriters: Jinzo Toriumi, Yu Yamamoto
- Planning: Jinzo Toriumi, Shigeru Yanagawa
- Created by: Tatsuo Yoshida
- Character Designs: Akiko Shimamoto, Mitsuki Nakamura
- Art Director: Mitsuki Nakamura
- Animation Director: Hayao Nobe
- Music: Shunsuke Kikuchi
- Animation Production: Tatsunoko Production, Topcraft
- Production: Tatsunoko Production Co., Ltd. / Fuji TV

== Cast ==
- Paul: Sumiko Shirakawa
- Nina: Keiko Yokozawa
- Pakkun: Yoko Asagami
- Belt Satan: Toru Ohira
- Doppe: Isamu Tanonaka

Filipino Characterization (in English)

- Paul - Paul
- Nina - Nina
- Pakkun - Moses
- Belt Satan - The Black Giant
- Doppe - Diggity
