= Hippo and Thomas =

Anime television series

- Thomas (left) with Hyppo (right)
- カバトット
- Created by: Tatsuo Yoshida
- Directed by: Hiroshi Sasagawa
- Music by: Koba Hayashi
- Country of origin: Japan
- Original language: Japanese
- No. of episodes: 75 (300 segments)

Production
- Production company: Tatsunoko Production

Original release
- Network: FNS (Fuji TV)
- Release: 2 January 1971 – 30 September 1972

Hippo and Thomas (カバトット, Kaba Totto) is an anime created by Tatsunoko Production. Thomas is a cunning bird who sponges on Kaba, the good-natured hippopotamus. Although Thomas is a dependent, living in Hippo's big mouth, he always acts lordly and tries to outsmart his simpleminded host. However, their basic friendship and cooperation endures despite their frequent quarrels. In the 1990s, it was dubbed into English as The Wacky World of Tic & Tac from Saban Entertainment. It was also part of Tic Tac Toons, a package series in where the anime was paired with Tamagon the Counselor (dubbed as Eggzavier the Eggasaurus).

== Characters ==
Thomas (トット, Totto)
Voiced by: Machiko Soga (1st), Junko Hori (2nd)
Hippo (カバ, Kaba)
Voiced by: Tōru Ōhira
