= Ikuo Nishikawa =

Japanese voice actor

- Born: Ehime, Japan
- Occupation: Voice actor
- Years active: 1965–present

Ikuo Nishikawa (西川 幾雄, Nishikawa Ikuo) is a Japanese voice actor who works for Production Baobab.

== Filmography ==
=== Television animation ===
- Star of the Giants (1968) (Mishima)
- Judo Boy (1969) (Sanshiro)
- Wandering Sun (1971) (Yumemaro)
- Casshan (1973) (Casshern)
- Brave Raideen (1975) (Tarou Sarumaru)
- The Adventures of Tom Sawyer (1980) (Jim)
- New Tetsujin-28 (1980) (Robby)
- The Irresponsible Captain Tylor (1993) (Robert J. Hanner)
- Nintama Rantarō (1993) (Rantaro's Father)
- Mahōjin Guru Guru (1994) (President of Darkness)
- Rurouni Kenshin (1996) (Saizuchi)
- Berserk (1997) (Godo)
- Rozen Maiden (2004) (Motoharu Shibasaki)
- Samurai 7 (2004) (Gisaku)
- Naruto (2005) (Sukeza)
- Negima! Magister Negi Magi (2005) (Principal of Magic Academy)
- Romeo × Juliet (2007) (Balthasar)
- Naruto: Shippuden (2009) (Fukasaku)
- Fate/Zero (2012) (Glen Mackenzie)

=== OVA ===
- Legend of the Galactic Heroes (1996)
- Blue Submarine No. 6 (1998) (Hugh W. Conwell)
- Mobile Suit Gundam Unicorn (2010) (Doillon)

=== Theatrical animation ===
- Appleseed (1988) (Elder Hestia)
- Lupin III: Dead or Alive (1996)
- Naruto the Movie: Ninja Clash in the Land of Snow (2004) (Sandayū Asama)

=== Video games ===
- Jak and Daxter: The Precursor Legacy (2001) (Explorer)
- Mega Man Zero 4 (2005) (Popla Cocapetri)
- Odin Sphere (2007) (Matthew and Skulldy)
- Ratchet & Clank Future: A Crack in Time (2009) (Orvus)

=== Tokusatsu ===
- Ultraman Taro (1973) (Voice of Alien Mefilas II, (Ep 27) Alien Katan, (Ep 35) Alien Medusa (Ep 37) )
- Jumborg Ace (1973) (Voice of OnestoKing, (Ep 41) Alien Gross (Last Episode) )
- Choujinki Metalder (1987) (Voice of Light Fighter Hedogross)

=== Dubbing ===
==== Live-action ====
- Blue Velvet (Ben (Dean Stockwell))
- Cube (Rennes (Wayne Robson))
- Don't Be Afraid of the Dark (Emerson Blackwood (Garry McDonald))
- Elizabeth (Palace Chamberlain (Peter Stockbridge))
- L.A. Law (Leland McKenzie (Richard Dysart))
- A Life Less Ordinary (Naville (Ian Holm))
- Larger than Life (Wee St. Francis (Tracey Walter))
- North Sea Hijack (1988 TV Asahi edition (Herring (David Wood)))
- Picket Fences (Judge Henry Bone (Ray Walston))
- Prison Break (Charles Westmoreland (Muse Watson))
- The Storyteller (Dog (Brian Henson))
- Sky Captain and the World of Tomorrow (Dr. Walter Jennings (Trevor Baxter))

==== Animated ====
- Batman: The Animated Series (Temple Fugate / The Clock King)
- Corpse Bride (Elder Gutknecht)
- Spider-Man (elderly Adrian Toomes/Vulture)
- Star Wars: Ewoks (Logray)
- Teenage Mutant Ninja Turtles (Baxter Stockman)
