= Tatsuo Yoshida =

Japanese manga artist and animator

- 吉田 竜夫
- Born: 吉田 龍夫 (Note: The pronunciation is the same.); March 6, 1932; Kyoto, Kyoto Prefecture, Japan
- Died: September 5, 1977 (aged 45); Chiyoda, Tokyo, Japan
- Occupations: Manga artist; animator; anime author; anime executive producer; studio executive
- Years active: 1954–1977
- Known for: Founder of Tatsunoko Production
- Notable work: Speed Racer, Casshern and Gatchaman series
- Title: President of Tatsunoko Production
- Relatives: Kenji Yoshida (brother); Ippei Kuri (brother)

Tatsuo Yoshida (吉田 竜夫, Yoshida Tatsuo; March 6, 1932 – September 5, 1977) was a Japanese manga artist and illustrator, as well as an anime pioneer who founded the animation studio Tatsunoko Production as a businessman and the original author of many anime works.

As the first president of Tatsunoko Production, Yoshida supported the dawn of Japanese animation by producing numerous hits, such as Speed Racer, Hakushon Daimaō, The Adventures of Hutch the Honeybee, and Science Ninja Team Gatchaman. He took on challenges that other animation studios did not, such as insisting on producing his own original animation that was not based on manga or novels, or creating American-style animation. Character designs were also drawn in Yoshida's style, with a solid skeleton and intricate lines drawn with precision, influenced by American comic books, rather than the simplified, less-linear style that was mainstream in Japanese animation at the time, and this became the origin of Tatsunoko's designs. (Note: However, it was difficult for other animators to follow his drawings, creating problems with the studio's schedule. Therefore, it was decided to include comedy animations designed with simple lines in the production rotation, and as a result, the range of Tatsunoko's style was broadened.)

== Biography ==
Born in Kyoto in 1932 as the eldest son of the Yoshida family, Tatsuo grew up in the hardship of war-torn Japan. His parents died shortly after the war, and he became a self-taught artist at an early age, supporting his family by drawing illustrations for newspapers and magazines, and sketches for Kamishibai (paper plays). After working for a local newspaper in Kyoto, he moved to Tokyo and began his career as a novel illustrator and E-monogatari (Note: Novel-like book with a high percentage of illustrations.) artist. He made his debut in 1954, and, after teaming up with Ikki Kajiwara in 1955, he continued to work mainly with him.

Around 1960, Yoshida changed his career to manga artist. His Champion Futoshi with Kajiwara and Shōnen Ninja-butai Gekkō, which he drew alone, were hits, and both were adapted into TV dramas. In particular, Ninja-butai Gekkō was broadcast for two years and a movie was produced, playing a role in Japan's ninja boom.

In October 1962, Yoshida founded Tatsunoko Production (Note: The studio's name has a double Japanese meaning of "Tatsu's child" and "sea dragon", which was the inspiration for its seahorse logo.) with his two younger brothers, Kenji Yoshida, who managed his manga, and Toyoharu Yoshida (a.k.a. Ippei Kuri), who was working as a manga artist, and became its first president. Initially, Tatsunoko was established as a production company specializing in manga, managing manga copyrights and assistants, but as Yoshida became interested in anime, the company began producing anime.

In 1965, Tatsunoko Production's first anime, Space Ace, was aired. The second anime, Mach GoGoGo, an animated racing series, was aired in Japan and then shortly after in the U.S. under the title Speed Racer, where it achieved resounding success. (Note: At the time, Japan was still broadcasting in black and white, but Tatsunoko produced Mach GoGoGo in color from the beginning for broadcast in the United States.)

He continued to produce anime works that have left their mark on Japanese animation history, including Gatchaman (also known as Battle of the Planets and G-Force: Guardians of Space), Casshan (also known as Neo-Human Casshern), Hurricane Polymar and Tekkaman: The Space Knight.

In 1972, he won the 17th Shogakukan Manga Award for his manga The Adventures of Hutch the Honeybee.

On September 5, 1977, he died of liver cancer. After his death, the presidency was taken over by his younger brother Kenji (from 1977 to 1987; chairman since 1995), followed by Ippei Kuri (since 1987), but they both left the company in 2005 when Tatsunoko became a subsidiary of major toy manufacturer Takara.

At the Tokyo Anime Awards held at the Tokyo International Anime Fair in 2005, he was awarded the Special Achievement Award as one of the 20 people who created Japanese animation.

== Main works ==
=== Manga and illustrations ===
Author	Title	Journal	Publication period	Remarks
Novels and E-monogatari
Tatsuo Yoshida	Jungle King	Shōnen Gahō (Shōnen Gahōsha)	November 1954 issue – April 1955 issue	
Ikki Kajiwara (story) / Tatsuo Yoshida (illustration)	Kōya no Kaidanji	Shōnen Gahō (Shōnen Gahōsha)	January 1955 issue	First collaboration work with Ikki Kajiwara.
Ikki Kajiwara (story) / Tatsuo Yoshida (illustration)	Shōnen Proresu Ō Tetsuwan Rikiya	"Bōken Ō" (Akita Shoten)	March 1955 issue – December 1957 issue	
Ikki Kajiwara (story) / Tatsuo Yoshida (illustration)	Shōnen Proresu Ō	Omoshiro Book (Shueisha)	November–December 1955 issue	
Ikki Kajiwara (story) / Tatsuo Yoshida (illustration)	Lou Thesz Monogatari	Omoshiro Book (Shueisha)	November 1955 issue	
Ikki Kajiwara (story) / Tatsuo Yoshida (illustration)	Proresu Gorō	Omoshiro Book (Shueisha)	January 1956 issue – July 1957 issue	
Takehiko Takeda (idea) / Tatsuo Yoshida (illustration)	Sekai Shōnentai	Omoshiro Book (Shueisha)	August 1957 issue -	
Ikki Kajiwara (story) / Tatsuo Yoshida (illustration)	Tatsumaki Sanshirō	Shōnen (Kobunsha)	January 1957 – June 1957 issue	
Ikki Kajiwara (story) / Tatsuo Yoshida (illustration)	Ōzora Kōshinkyoku	Shōnen extra edition (Kobunsha)	January 1957 New Year Special Issue	
Ikki Kajiwara (story) / Tatsuo Yoshida (illustration)	Byakko Daisuke	Bokura (Kodansha)	January – December 1958 issue	
Manga
Ichiro Miyagawa (original story) / Tatsuo Yoshida (manga)	Super Giant	Bokura (Kodansha)	August 1959 issue – June 1961 issue	Manga version of Japan's first Tokusatsu superhero live-action movie Super Giant. After being adapted into a comic by Jiro Kuwata, Daiji Kazumine, and Masamichi Yokoyama, he wrote an original story for the manga.
DC Comics (original) / Tatsuo Yoshida (manga)	Superman	Shōnen Gahō (Shōnen Gahōsha)	May 1960 issue – October 1960 issue	Japanese version of the American comic book Superman franchise.
Ikki Kajiwara (story) / Tatsuo Yoshida (art)	Champion Futoshi	Weekly Shōnen Magazine (Kodansha)	1962 No. 1 – 1963 No. 52	Ikki Kajiwara's debut work as a manga author.
Asao Takamori (Note: Ikki Kajiwara's pen name.) (Story) / Tatsuo Yoshida (Art)	0-sen champion	Bokura (Kodansha)	August 1962-September 1963	Boxing manga.
Tatsuo Yoshida	Shōnen Ninja-butai Gekkō	Weekly Shōnen King (Shōnen Gahōsha)	1963 No. 1 – 1965 No. 10	Original of the Tokusatsu TV series Phantom Agents (a.k.a. Ninja Squad Moonlight).
Asao Takamori (story) / Tatsuo Yoshida (art)	Ōzora Sanshirō	Bokura (Kodansha)	October 1963 – August 1964	
Ikki Kajiwara (story) / Tatsuo Yoshida (art)	Harris Mudan	Weekly Shōnen Magazine (Kodansha)	1963 No. 51 – 1965 No. 15	
Tatsuo Yoshida	Space Ace	Shōnen Book (Shueisha)	July 1964 issue – May 1966 issue	Comic adaptation of Tatsunoko Production's first TV animation series Space Ace.
Tatsuo Yoshida. (Note: Yoshida's own brother, Kenji Yoshida, was credited as the original author from 1961 under the pen name Kenji Maruyama)	Pilot A (Ace)	Shōnen Gahō (Shōnen Gahōsha)	November 1960 issue – April 1964 issue	A car racing manga, which, along with Mach Sanshirō, was the basis for Tatsunoko Productions' anime Mach GoGoGo.
Minoru Kume (story) / Ippei Kuri (art) / Tatsuo Yoshida (composition)	Mach Sanshirō	Weekly Shōnen Magazine (Kodansha)	1960 No. 8 – 1961 No. 52	A motorcycle racing manga, which, along with Pilot A, was the basis for Tatsunoko Productions' anime Mach GoGoGo. The radio drama adaptation was produced under the sponsorship of Kodansha and Tohatsu, the leading Japanese motorcycle manufacturer at the time.
Tatsuo Yoshida & Tatsunoko Production	Mach GoGoGo	Shōnen Book (Shueisha)	June 1966 issue – May 1968 issue	Comic adaptation of Tatsunoko Productions' anime work of the same title.
Tatsuo Yoshida & Tatsunoko Production	Kurenai Sanshirō	Weekly Shōnen Jump (Shueisha)	1969 No. 10-13	While Ippei Kuri's manga of the same title is the original work of the Tatsunoko Productions' anime Judo Boy (a.k.a. Kurenai Sanshirō), this is a comic adaptation of the same anime.
Tatsuo Yoshida & Tatsunoko Production	The Adventures of Hutch the Honeybee			Comic adaptation of Tatsunoko Productions' anime work of the same title.

=== Anime ===
- Space Ace (1964-1966) – Original story, episode director
- Mach GoGoGo (1967-1968, also known as Speed Racer) – Original story, producer, production, lyrics (Note: Theme song Mach Go Go Go Go.)
- Oraa Guzura Dado (1967) – Producer
- Dokachin the Primitive Boy (1968) – Original story, planning, producer, production
- Judo Boy (1969) – Original story, production
- Hakushon Daimaō (1969-1970, also known as Bob in the Bottle or The Genie Family) – Original story, production
- The Adventures of Hutch the Honeybee (1970-1971) – Original story, production
- New Honeybee Hutch (1974) – Original Story
- The Adventures of Hutch the Honeybee (1989-1990, remake) – Original Story
- Inakappe Taishō (1970-1972) – Production
- Hyppo and Thomas (1971-1972) – Production
- Animmentary Ketsudan (1971) – Character design, (Note: Credited jointly with Takashi Yomitsu and Akira Ugaki.) animation director, (Note: Credited jointly with Sadao Miyamoto and Ippei Kuri.) production
- Pinocchio: The Series (1972) – Planning, production, character design (Note: Credited jointly with Ippei Kuri and Yoshitaka Amano.)
- Science Ninja Team Gatchaman (1972-1974, dubbed and re-edited as Battle of the Planets and G-Force: Guardians of Space in North America) – Original story, character design, production
- Gatchaman II (1978-1979, dubbed and re-edited as part of Saban's "Eagle Riders" in North America) – Original story, production (Note: He died during the broadcast, so the credit changed to Kenji Yoshida, who took over the role midway through.)
- Gatchaman Fighter (1979-1980 dubbed and re-edited as part of "Saban's Eagle Riders" in North America) – Original story
- Gatchaman (1994) – original story
- Tamagon the Counselor (1972-1973) – Production
- Demetan Croaker, The Boy Frog (1973) – Planning, character design, (Note: Credited jointly with Yoshitaka Amano) production
- Casshan (1973) – Original story, character design, production
- Hurricane Polymar (1974-1975) – Original story, character design
- The Song of Tentomushi (1974-1976) – Production (Note: His name is not credited.)
- Tekkaman: The Space Knight (1975) – Production
- Time Bokan (1975-1976) – Production
- Paul's Miraculous Adventure (1976-1977) – Production
- Yatterman (1977-1979) – Production (Note: Episodes 1-36. He died during the broadcast, so Kenji Yoshida took over the role, but his name remained in the credits.)
- Ippatsu Kanta-kun (1977-1978) – Production (Note: He died just before the broadcast began, but his credits remained the same.)
- Temple the Balloonist (1977-1978) – Production

== Notes and references ==
=== References ===
Preceded by Position Founded	President of Tatsunoko Production; 1962–1977	Succeeded by Kenji Yoshida
