= Space Ace (TV series) =

Japanese manga series

- 宇宙エース
- Genre: Science fiction
- Created by: Tatsuo Yoshida
- Directed by: Hiroshi Sasagawa
- Music by: Akihiko Komori
- Country of origin: Japan
- Original language: Japanese
- No. of episodes: 52

Production
- Producer: Kenji Yoshida
- Production company: Tatsunoko Production

Original release
- Network: Fuji TV
- Release: 8 May 1965 – 28 April 1966

Related
- Manga
- Written by: Tatsuo Yoshida
- Published by: Shueisha
- Magazine: Shōnen Book
- Original run: June 1964 – May 1966

Space Ace (Japanese: 宇宙エース, Hepburn: Uchū Ēsu), also known as Uchuu Ace, is a Japanese science fiction anime television series produced by Tatsunoko Production that aired on Fuji TV from May 8, 1965, to April 28, 1966. Anime Sols attempted to crowdfund the series in 2014. A manga adaptation written and illustrated by Tatsuo Yoshida was serialized in Shueisha's Shōnen Book magazine from June 1964 to May 1966.

== Overview ==
Space Ace is the story of an alien young boy named Space Ace (or Ace for short), given to homesick stargazing with the faces of his loved ones ghosted across the heavens. His tool of preference is the galaxy ring, a flat white hoop he can produce from his fingers to be thrown or ride on. The supporting cast includes Dr. Tatsunoko, who is almost a father figure to Ace, and his daughter Asari, Ace's love interest. Providing the show's comedy relief was crusading investigative reporter Yadokari, who usually burst on the scene riding his jet skycycle at the worst possible moment, screaming for Ace to give him interviews and so on. One of the show's most important characters is "Ebo", Ace's imagined projection into the night sky depicted as a humanoid robot.

== Cast ==
- Sumiko Shirakawa as Ace
- Iemasa Kayumi as Dr. Tatsunoko
- Kenji Utsumi as Ibo
- Kinya Aikawa as Yadokari
- Mariko Mukai as Asari
- Yutaka Ohyama as Dr. Montgomery

== Episodes ==
1. "Birth of Ace"
2. "Revenge Robot"
3. "Earth Exile"
4. "Atomic Robot"
5. "Secret Society"
6. "Space Jellyfish"
7. "The Return of Genghis Khan"
8. "Space Cocoons"
9. "Cave Men"
10. "The Space Pirates"
11. "Space Flower"
12. "Space Clown"
13. "Invisible Monster Star"
14. "Song of the Mermaid"
15. "Ace Imposter"
16. "The Spaceman Who Likes Fighting"
17. "The Space Blob"
18. "Lost World"
19. "Fish People"
20. "The Time Capsule"
21. "Human Bomb"
22. "Forbidden Treasure"
23. "Stolen Face"
24. "Moon Rocket"
25. "Ion Drive Ring"
26. "Orion Raiders"
27. "Galaxy Conference"
28. "The Robot"
29. "The X Bomb"
30. "Cyborg from Orion"
31. "Ultra Men (Part 1)"
32. "Ultra Men (Part 2)"
33. "Youth Machine"
34. "Miracle Planet"
35. "Magic Land"
36. "Space Race (Part 1)"
37. "Space Race (Part 2)"
38. "The Dictator"
39. "Haunted Space Ship"
40. "Mars S.O.S."
41. "Time Machine"
42. "Robot Revolt"
43. "Orion Invasion"
44. "Space Microbes"
45. "Space Radio"
46. "Exile to Orion"
47. "Space Prison"
48. "The Space Killer"
49. "Telepaths"
50. "Space Fortress" - April 14, 1966
51. "Brain Missiles" - April 21, 1966
52. "Space War" - April 28, 1966
