= Hiroshi Sasagawa =

Japanese animator (born 1936)

- 笹川 ひろし
- Born: July 9, 1936 (age 90); Aizuwakamatsu, Japan
- Years active: 1958–present
- Known for: Character design, illustration
- Notable work: Time Bokan, Speed Racer

Hiroshi Sasagawa (笹川 ひろし, Sasagawa Hiroshi; born July 9, 1936) is a Japanese animator and cartoonist known for directing several anime series including Time Bokan, Speed Racer, The Genie Family, Ninja Hattori-Kun, and Tekkaman: The Space Knight.

== Early life ==
Sasagawa made his debut as a manga artist in 1958 with the serialization of Detective School in the magazine Shōnen Gahōsha. After working as an assistant to Osamu Tezuka, he became a director from the founding of Tatsunoko Production. He was one of the key figures in Tatsunoko's golden age from the 1970s to the 1980s. His representative works include the Time Bokan series. He handled many gag works and excelled at directing gags that utilized repetition. He was known as the "Emperor of Gag Anime" and "Kin-chan of the Anime World" (referring to Kin'ichi Hagimoto, a famous comedian). However, he himself reportedly preferred serious stories like Neo-Human Casshern. From the 1980s to the early 1990s, after leaving Tatsunoko Production, he worked on many Fujiko Fujio works, including Ninja Hattori-kun, Perman, Obake no Q-Taro, and Pokonyan!.

At Tatsunoko Production, as a director and head of the directing department, he recruited trainees in 1975 and hired Koichi Mashimo, Hidehito Ueda, Mizuho Nishikubo, and Mamoru Oshii as directors (they would later be known as the "Tatsunoko Four Heavenly Kings"). At his personal office, Hiroshi Sasagawa Office, he fostered numerous talents, including Osada Not, Futago Kamikita (Minna Kamikita, Kisa Kamikita), Yasuhiro Imagawa, and Tomosato Motegi.

"Doctor Sasayabu" and "Sasayaki Reporter" who appear in the Time Bokan series are modeled after Sasagawa. Additionally, the intellectual members of the villainous trio in the same series, excluding Julie Kokematsu (Grocky, Boyacky, Tobokke, Sekobicchi, Kosuinen, Dasainen, Hiel, Tsubuyacky, etc.), are also said to be partially modeled after Sasagawa.

== Career ==
Born in Aizuwakamatsu, Fukushima Prefecture, Japan, he is well known as one of creators of Time Bokan series (with Ippei Kuri, Mitsuki Nakamura and Yoshitaka Amano), he has directed several animation works in the fantasy and science fiction genre, many (though not all) of them with Tatsunoko Production.

== List of works ==
- Space Ace (1965-1966)
- Speed Racer (1967-1968)
- Oraa Guzura Dado (1967-1968)
- Dokachin the Primitive Boy (1968-1969)
- The Genie Family (Hakushon Daimao) (1969-1970)
- The Funny Judo Champion (Inakappe Taishou; original manga by Noboru Kawasaki) (1970-1972)
- Hyppo and Thomas (1971-1972)
- Science Ninja Team Gatchaman (1972-1974)
- Demetan Croaker, The Boy Frog (1973)
- The Song of Tentomushi (Tentomushi no Uta; original manga by Noboru Kawasaki) (1974-1976)
- Tekkaman: The Space Knight (1975)
- Time Bokan (1975-1976)
- Paul's Miracle Strategy Plan (1976-1977)
- Yatterman (1977-1979)
- Ippatsu Kanta-kun (1977-1978)
- Zenderman (1979-1980)
- Rescueman (1980-1981)
- Space Battleship Yamato III (1980-1981)
- Maeterlinck's Blue Bird: Tyltyl and Mytyl's Adventurous Journey (1980, with Leiji Matsumoto)
- Yattodetaman (1981-1982)
- Beast King Go-Lion (Lion Force Voltron) (1981-1982, series by Toei Animation)
- Bremen 4: Angels in Hell (1981, with Osamu Tezuka)
- Gyakuten! Ippatsuman (1982-1983)
- Tokimeki Tonight (1982, original manga by Koi Ikeno; series by Group TAC)
- Itadakiman (1983)
- Starzan S (1984; script writer)
- Ox Tales (1987)
- Wowser (1988)
- Honō no Tōkyūji: Dodge Danpei (1991-1992)
- Dokkan! Robotendon (1995-1996)
- Cinderella Monogatari (1996)
- Speed Racer X (1997)

== See also ==
- Tatsunoko Production
- Bessatsu Shōnen Sunday
- List of Time Bokan series
