= Dokachin the Primitive Boy =

Japanese anime television series

- ドカチン
- Genre: Comedy, science fiction
- Created by: Tatsuo Yoshida
- Directed by: Hiroshi Sasagawa (Chief Director)
- Music by: Seiichiro Uno
- Country of origin: Japan
- Original language: Japanese
- No. of episodes: 26

Production
- Producer: Tatsuo Yoshida
- Production company: Tatsunoko Production

Original release
- Network: Fuji TV
- Release: 2 October 1968 – 26 March 1969

Dokachin the Primitive Boy (ドカチン, Dokachin) is an anime created by Tatsunoko Production. A prehistoric boy, his family and a chunk of land from the past, were accidentally brought to the present time by a scientist's time-travel experiments.
