= Guzura =

Japanese anime television series

おらぁグズラだど (Oraa Guzura Dado)
- Genre: Comedy
- Created by: Hiroshi Sasagawa
- Manga
- Written by: Hiroshi Sasagawa
- Published by: Shogakukan
- Magazine: Weekly Shōnen Sunday
- Original run: 1967 – 1968
- Volumes: 2
- Anime television series
- Directed by: Hiroshi Sasagawa (chief)
- Produced by: Tatsuo Yoshida
- Music by: Kousuke Onozaki
- Studio: Tatsunoko Production
- Original network: Fuji TV
- English network: Nine Network
- Original run: October 7, 1967 – September 25, 1968
- Episodes: 52
- Anime television series
- Produced by: Kiyoshi Ishikawa (Yomiko); Tomomasa Yoneda (Anime Friend)
- Music by: Kousuke Onozaki
- Studio: Tatsunoko Production
- Original network: MegaTON (TV Tokyo)
- Original run: October 12, 1987 – September 20, 1988
- Episodes: 44

Guzura (おらぁグズラだど, Ora Guzura Dado; lit."Hey, I'm Guzura!"), also known as Guzula the Amicable Monster, Gudzulla or So It's Gudzulla, is a anime comedy television series created by Hiroshi Sasagawa and produced by Tatsunoko Production that aired on Fuji Television and its affiliates from October 7, 1967 to September 25, 1968 for 52 episodes. The series was based on Sasagawa's one-shot manga "Onboro Kaijū Guzura" published the previous year as the clumsy and straightforward character of Guzura was very popular at the time.

A manga adaptation by Sasagawa was serialized in Weekly Shōnen Sunday from 1967 to 1968 during production of the anime.

The anime was remade into a 44-episode series that aired on TV Tokyo between October 12, 1987, and September 30, 1988.

== Plot ==
One day Mt. Bikkura erupts and blows up an egg, which hatches a little monster named Guzura. Astray in the human world, he is surprised and puzzled as everything he hears and sees is so strange, and he is involved in odd affairs one after another. Besides, people around him are often drawn into humorous troubles. He has a magic ability to eat metal and produce a variety of mechanical devices. Also, he can blow flames out of his mouth and jump high using his powerful tail. Yet he is so innocent and friendly that he becomes popular wherever he goes.

== Localization ==
The original black-and-white series was aired on Australia in 1971 under the title Guzula the Amicable Monster. Guzura and Bonta were renamed "Guzula" and "Oshio" respectively. The anime series was aired in Australia's Nine Network. The 1987 remake series was aired internationally, such as in France, Spain and Quebec where it was shown under the name "Gozura" and in Italy where it was shown under the name "Il mio amico Guz" and in Spain under the name "Cornelio".

== Cast ==
- Toru Ohira as Guzura
- Mie Azuma as Bonta
- Yoshiko Matsuo as Susuko
- Kei Tomiyama as Papa
- Mitsuko Asou as Mama
