= Tōru Ōhira =

Japanese voice actor (1929–2016)

- 大平 透
- Born: September 24, 1929; Tokyo, Japan
- Died: April 12, 2016 (aged 86)
- Occupations: Narrator; voice actor
- Years active: 1952–2015

Tōru Ōhira (大平 透, Ōhira Tōru; September 24, 1929 – April 12, 2016) was a Japanese narrator and voice actor from the Tokyo Metropolitan Area. He was the founder of Ōhira Production and was also attached to 81 Produce.

One of his best-known roles was the dub voice of Darth Vader in Star Wars, on the series' home video releases and playing the title character Moguro Fukuzō in the original The Laughing Salesman. He was also known for his many narration roles, most notably in the Super Sentai series.

== Overview ==
Ōhira was a very influential figure in the dubbing industry during the Shōwa period.

After graduating from Tokyo Metropolitan University Jōnan Senior High School (in which he was also the supervisor of the school's volleyball team), he went on to graduate from the Meiji University Department of Political Science and Economics. In 1954, he joined the Nippon Broadcasting System, in which he became an announcer and producer. In 1955, with the opening of the Tokyo Broadcasting System, he enlisted in its theatrical company. He left the company in 1958 to become a voice artist.

His breakthrough performance was the dubbing voice of Darth Vader in the Star Wars series. He reprised this role for Star Wars: Episode III – Revenge of the Sith and a crossover appearance in Soulcalibur IV- notable because the game was originally in Japanese, meaning that Ōhira was Vader's "original" voice in the game, unlike with the films. In addition, he was usually cast in either astringent villain roles or gag characters, such as Pete in Disney cartoons.

He was also a close friend of Kyosen Ōhashi, and the mentor of Shirō Yasutomi.

On April 12, 2016, Ōhira died from pneumonia at the age of 86. As his last will, he requested Tesshō Genda to replace him as the voice of Moguro Fukuzō.

== Filmography ==
=== Television animation ===
- Oraa Guzura Dado (1967) (Guzura)
- The Genie Family (1969) (Hakushon Daimaō)
- Science Ninja Team Gatchaman (1972) (Doctor Kozaburo Nambu)
- Dash Kappei (1981) (Seiichiro)
- Mirai Keisatsu Urashiman (1983) (Gondo)
- Osomatsu-kun (1988) (Dekapan)
- The Laughing Salesman (1989) (Fukuzō Moguro)
- Steal Napoleon's Dictionary! (1991) (Hēkā)
- One Piece (2000) (Gaimon)
- A Little Snow Fairy Sugar (2001) (Luchino)
- PaRappa the Rapper (2001) (Milk Man episode 20)
- Basilisk (2005) (Tokugawa Ieyasu)
- Save Me! Lollipop (2006) (Grandfather)
- Ojarumaru (2009) (Denbo Shijiyourou)

=== Theatrical animation ===
- The Littlest Warrior (1961) – Mok
- Lupin III: The Mystery of Mamo (1978) – Stuckey
- Be Forever Yamato (1980) – Führer Skulldard
- Cyborg 009: Legend of the Super Galaxy (1980) – Zoa
- Doraemon: Nobita and the Winged Braves (2001) – Cyclid
- Doraemon: Nobita in the Wan-Nyan Spacetime Odyssey (2004) – President

=== Video games ===
Year	Title	Role	Console	Source
2001	Sakura Taisen 3 ~Pari wa Moeteiru ka?~	Duke Calmar		
2001	Stupid Invaders	Gorgious Klatoo	Dreamcast, Microsoft Windows	
2002	Space Channel 5: Part 2	President Peace	Dreamcast, PlayStation 2, Xbox Live Arcade, PlayStation Network, Steam, Microsoft Windows	
2002	Kingdom Hearts	Mayor of Halloween Town	PlayStation 2	
2005	Kingdom Hearts II	Pete, Mayor of Halloween Town	PlayStation 2	
2008	Soulcalibur IV	Darth Vader	PlayStation 3, Xbox 360	
2008	Tatsunoko vs. Capcom: Cross Generation of Heroes	Hakushon Daimaō		
2009	Kingdom Hearts Coded	Pete	NTT docomo	
2010	Kingdom Hearts Birth by Sleep	Pete	PlayStation Portable	
2010	Kingdom Hearts Re:coded	Pete	Nintendo DS	
2012	Kingdom Hearts 3D: Dream Drop Distance	Pete, Julius	Nintendo 3DS	
2014	Kingdom Hearts HD 2.5 ReMIX	Pete	PlayStation 3	

- Castlevania: Curse of Darkness (Saint Germain)
- White Knight Chronicles (Gamarone)

=== Tokusatsu ===
- Ninja Buttai Gekko (1964) as Narrator
- Spectreman (1971) as Chief Kurata
- Ambassador Magma (Goa) (body and voice)
- Spider-Man (1978-1979) as Narrator
- Super Sentai Series
  - Himitsu Sentai Gorenger (1975-1977) (Narrator)
  - JAKQ Dengekitai (1977) (Narrator)
  - Battle Fever J (Narrator)
  - Denshi Sentai Denziman (Narrator)
  - Taiyo Sentai Sun Vulcan (Narrator)
  - Dai Sentai Goggle Five (Narrator)
  - Kagaku Sentai Dynaman (Narrator)
  - Kyōryū Sentai Zyuranger (Narrator)
  - Chōriki Sentai Ohranger (Emperor Bacchus Wrath (eps. 1 - 16, 18 - 23, 26, 27, 29 - 31, 33, 34, 39 & 40))
- Metal Hero Series
  - Uchuu Keiji Shaider (Narrator)
  - 3 Space Sheriff Special Crossover (Narrator)
  - Kyojuu Tokusou Juspion (Narrator)
  - Jikuu Senshi Spielban (Narrator)
  - Sekai Ninja Sen Jiraiya (Narrator)
  - Kidou Keiji Jiban (Narrator)

=== Dubbing roles ===
==== Live-action ====
- Telly Savalas (TV Asahi)
  - Battle of the Bulge
  - Kelly's Heroes
  - Capricorn One
- A.I. Artificial Intelligence (Teddy)
- Adventures in Dinosaur City (Big)
- Adventures of Superman (Superman)
- Batman (1992 TBS Dub) (The Joker (Jack Nicholson))
- Cats & Dogs (Presiding Judge Dog)
- Coogan's Bluff (Lieutenant McElroy (Lee J. Cobb))
- Django (1980 TV Tokyo edition) (Major Jackson (Eduardo Fajardo))
- Fantasia 2000 (Quincy Jones)
- The French Connection (Alain Charnier)
- French Connection II (Alain Charnier)
- Master of the Flying Guillotine (Fung Sheng Wu Chi)
- Mission: Impossible (1999 Fuji TV edition) (The Voice on Tape)
- The NeverEnding Story (1987 TV Asahi edition) (Rockbiter (Alan Oppenheimer))
- Patton (George S. Patton (George C. Scott))
- Project A (Governor-general)
- Some Like It Hot (Agent Mulligan (Pat O'Brien))
- Superman (Jor-El (Marlon Brando))
- Star Wars series (Darth Vader (James Earl Jones); home video versions), Boss Nass (Brian Blessed))
  - Star Wars: Episode III – Revenge of the Sith

==== Animation ====
- The Flintstones (Fred Flintstone)
- Monsters, Inc. (2002) (Henry J. Waternoose)
- The Nightmare Before Christmas (Mayor)
- Secret Squirrel (Yellow Pinkie)
- Space Goofs (Gorgious Klatoo) (Danny Mann)
- The Simpsons (Homer Simpson (Dan Castellaneta))
- Productions for the Walt Disney Company (Pete)
  - A Goofy Movie
  - An Extremely Goofy Movie
  - House of Mouse
