= Kenji Yoshida =

Japanese film producer and artist (born 1935)

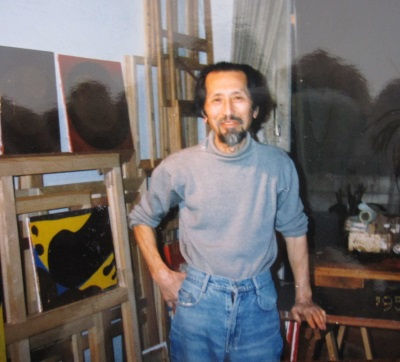
- Born: January 1, 1935 (age 91); Kyoto, Japan
- Occupations: Producer, manga artist, illustrator
- Years active: 1962–2005
- Relatives: Tatsuo Yoshida (brother); Ippei Kuri (brother)

Kenji Yoshida (吉田 健二, Yoshida Kenji; born January 1, 1935) is a Japanese anime producer, manga artist and illustrator best known as the co-founder of Tatsunoko Production. Yoshida is the younger brother of Tatsuo Yoshida and the older brother of Ippei Kuri. After Tatsuo's death in 1977, Yoshida replaced him as president and ran the company until Kuri succeeded him in 1987. On July 1, 2005, he and Kuri resigned from Tatsunoko Production when Takara merged with Tomy. With Kuri's death on July 1, 2023, he became the last surviving Yoshida brother.

== Notes ==
Preceded by Tatsuo Yoshida	President of Tatsunoko Production; 1977–1987	Succeeded by Ippei Kuri
