= Shōnen Book =

Japanese manga magazine by Shueisha

- First issue of Shōnen Book, the cover features man standing next to an airplane, this was done for a feature film at the time. It also mentions Omoshiro Book.
- Editor: Saburō Shibata
- Categories: Shōnen manga
- Frequency: Monthly
- First issue: March 1958
- Final issue Number: April 1969; 4
- Company: Shueisha
- Country: Japan
- Based in: Tokyo
- Language: Japanese

Shōnen Book (Japanese: 少年ブック, Hepburn: Shōnen Bukku; lit. 'Boys' Book') was a manga magazine by Shueisha, which debuted March 1958 and ended in April 1969. Shōnen Book was originally a spin-off of Shueisha's Omoshiro Book (おもしろブック, Omoshiro Bukku; 'Funny Book'). Shōnen Book is famously known in Japan for being the predecessor to the company's famous Weekly Shōnen Jump magazine. The Shōnen Book tankōbon manga volumes are published under the Shōnen Speed Ō (少年スピード王) manga imprint. Shōnen Book was a part of Shueisha's former leading magazine line, Book, now Jump. Shōnen Book was created in 1958 as a male version of the short lived Shōjo Book. Omoshiro Book became an offshoot of the magazine, and eventually faded away in the middle of the Shōnen Book timeline. Shōnen Book also served as a root to many other magazines published by Shueisha.

== History ==
Shueisha was just getting into the business of making manga magazines, creating the magazine Omoshiro Book in 1949 and the shōjo magazine Shōjo Book in 1951. The success of Shōjo Book, led to the publication of their widely successful, Ribon. Shueisha was planning to make a shōnen version of their Shōjo Book magazine, and they created Shōnen Book. Shōnen Book was created as a sister anthology to their already successful Omoshiro Book, on the front cover of the first Shōnen Book it announced that Omoshiro Book would continue as a special issue of Shōnen Book. Omoshiro Book had an Osamu Tezuka manga called Lion Books. Shōnen Book, historically had some of the most famous manga artists of all time, such as Tatsuo Yoshida whose Mach GoGoGo (Speed Racer) appeared in the magazine, and which ultimately was rereleased by Fusosha as two deluxe volumes. The magazine also serialized many of Osamu Tezuka's manga series. In the middle of Shōnen Book's publication, Shōnen Jump was created, making Shōnen Book a special issue. Shōnen Jump at the time was a semiweekly magazine. When it became a weekly magazine, the title of Shōnen Jump was changed to Weekly Shōnen Jump, and Shōnen Book was discontinued. The magazine of Shōnen Book was replaced with a special called Bessatsu Shōnen Jump, which was later changed to the title Monthly Shōnen Jump (branched off into its own magazine, discontinued, and was replaced with the current; Jump Square), and then finally Akamaru Jump (the latter of which is now a "Zōkan" (special) issue).

== Features ==
Shōnen Book much like many other manga magazines had many different features such as manga series, articles, etc. Shōnen Book also had special editions like Sanchōme no Yūhi Tokubetsuhen: Bōken Shōnen Book (三丁目の夕日特別編冒険少年ブック, Sanchōme no Yūhi Tokubetsuhen Bōken Shōnen Bukku; 'The Evening Sun, Special Compilation of Three Chomes: Adventure Boy Book'), which was a children's version of the main anthology, aimed at young children. Or Tsūkai Book (痛快ブック, Tsūkai Bukku; 'Pungent Book'), which features all color artwork.

An essential feature of Shōnen Book is that it had many famous manga artists in it. The magazine published series from the God of Manga, Osamu Tezuka, and also published Tatsuo Yoshida's Mach GoGoGo, which has become a successful title in the late ages of anime in the United States. Also in Shōnen Book, a manga adaptation of the sequel to the Mighty Jack TV drama: Tatakae! Mighty Jack. The famous Harenchi Gakuen also started in Shōnen Book, and later moved to the major Weekly Shōnen Jump.

In addition to the manga series of Shōnen Book, it also featured many light novel series. The light novels are based on the running series in the magazine.

=== Manga in the last issue of Shōnen Book ===
This list contains all of the manga in the last issue of Shōnen Book. Three of the series were transferred to the Shōnen Jump magazine, also put under their new imprint—Jump Comics.

==== Manga series ====
Manga	Began	Ended	Creator
Grand Prix Yarō (グランプリ野郎)	April 1968	April 1969	Kōki Yokoyama
Ryūsei Kyūdan (流星球団)	January 1968	April 1969	Sachio Umemoto × Kazuya Fukumoto
Vampire (Dai 2 Bu) (バンパイヤ(第2部))	January 1968	April 1969	Osamu Tezuka
Manga Daigaku (マンガ大学)	January 1969	April 1969	Fujio Akatsuka
Kōsoku ESP (光速エスパー)	June 1968	April 1969	Reiji Matsumoto
Chichi no Tamashii (父の魂)	April 1969	April 1969 (continued in Shōnen Jump)	Hiroshi Kaiduka
Harenchi Gakuen (ハレンチ学園)	April 1969	April 1969 (continued in Shōnen Jump)	Gō Nagai
Otoko no Jōken (男の条件)	April 1969	April 1969 (continued in Shōnen Jump)	Noboru Kawasaki × Ikki Kajiwara

==== One-shots ====
Manga	Published	Creator
Dorobō Gakuen (ドロボウ学園)	April 1969	Rentarō Itai
Otoire Daisakusen (オトイレ大作戦)	April 1969	Takumi Takahashi
Koibito-kun (コイビトくん)	April 1969	Gō Nagai
Aku Sanbiki (悪三匹)	April 1969	Sachio Umemoto

== Shōnen Book media in the English language ==
Only the series Mach GoGoGo has been released in English. More importantly, the anime was one of the first brought to the United States of America, as well as the manga. The manga was first published by NOW Comics, selecting chapters from the series under the title of the English anime. Mach GoGoGo was later released in complete volumes by DC Comics's Wildstorm Productions under the title Speed Racer: the Original Manga, the cover art was done by Robert DeJesus. Currently the series is published by Digital Manga Publishing under the title Speed Racer: Mach Go Go Go.

Although "Speed Racer" has found success in the States, some other series have also appeared in the United States under other media besides manga or anime. An example of this would be Obake no Q-Tarō by Fujiko Fujio, the Shōnen Book series was never published in English, although a video game based on the series was published in the United States. This game was called Obake no Q-tarō: WanWan Panic retitled Chubby Cherub, and was heavily altered. The game was originally made for fans of the series, which Americans would have no knowledge of. Q-tarō, the Ghost was replaced with a cherub. The series has been in many other magazines besides Shōnen Book, such as CoroCoro Comic, Weekly Shōnen Sunday, and Bessatsu Shōnen Sunday, making the game media of all four of the anthologies.

Even currently Shōnen Book appeared in United States. In the Astro Boy Game Boy Advance video game Astro Boy: Omega Factor, the main character of the Big X series made a cameo. Astro Boy: Omega Factor was released in States on August 17, 2004.

As for the manga based on television series, not the manga, but the Mighty Jack TV series had episodes one through six merged into a dubbed feature-length film (much like Giant Robo). This was a common act of filmmaking at the time. The series gained more exposure after its appearance on Mystery Science Theater 3000, which in the 1980s aired on Comedy Central. Also the manga Captain Scarlet was an adaptation of the United Kingdom TV show: Captain Scarlet and the Mysterons, which was in English to begin with.
