= List of science fiction television programs, T =

This is an inclusive list of science fiction television programs whose names begin with the letter T.

== T ==
Live-action

- Taken (2002, miniseries)
- Tales from the Darkside (1983–1988, anthology)
- Tales from the Loop
- Tales of the Unexpected (1979–1988, UK, anthology)
- Tales of Tomorrow (1951–1953, anthology)
- Target Luna (franchise):
  - Target Luna (1960, UK) IMDb
  - Pathfinders in Space (1960, UK, Target Luna sequel) IMDb
  - Pathfinders to Mars (1960–1961, UK, Pathfinders in Space sequel) IMDb
  - Pathfinders to Venus (1961, UK, Pathfinders to Mars sequel) IMDb
- Tattooed Teenage Alien Fighters from Beverly Hills (1994)
- Teen Titans (franchise):
- Teenage Caveman (2002, film)
- Ninja Turtles: The Next Mutation a.k.a. NT:TNM (1997–1998)
- TekWar (franchise):
  - Tekwar a.k.a. Tekwar: The Movie (1994, Canada/US, first film)
  - TekWar: TekLords a.k.a. TekLords (1994, Canada/US, second film)
  - TekLab (1994, Canada/US, third film)
  - TekJustice a.k.a. Tekjustice: The Final Showdown (1994, Canada/US, fourth film)
  - TekWar (1995–1996, Canada/US)
- Tenchi Muyo! (franchise) (elements of science fiction):
- Terminator: The Sarah Connor Chronicles (2008–2009)
- Terra Nova (2011)
- Terrahawks (1983–1986, UK, puppetry)
- Tetsujin 28-go (1960, Japan)
- That Was Then (2002)
- They Came from Outer Space (1990–1991)
- Third Eye, The (1981–1983, anthology)
- This Is Not My Life (2010, New Zealand)
- Three-Body Problem, The (franchise):
  - Three-Body (2023, China)
  - Three-Body Problem, The (2023)
- Three Moons Over Milford (2006)
- Threshold (2005–2006)
- Thunderbirds (1965–1966, UK, puppetry)
- Thunderstone (1999–2000, Australia)
- Tick, The (2001–2002) (elements of science fiction)
- Time After Time (2017)
- Time Express (1979) (elements of science fiction)
- Time Riders (1991, UK) IMDb
- Time Trax (1993–1994)
- Time Tunnel, The (franchise):
  - Time Tunnel, The (1966–1967)
  - Time Travelers (1976, remake, pilot, film)
  - Time Tunnel, The (2002, pilot)
- Timecop (1997–1998)
- Timelapse (1980, Australia) IMDb
- Timeless (2016–2018)
- Timeslip (1970, UK)
- Timestalkers (1987, film)
- Tin Man (2007, miniseries)
- Titans (2018-2023)
- Tom Corbett, Space Cadet (1950–1955)
- Tom Smothers' Organic Prime Time Space Ride (1971) IMDb
- Tommyknockers, The (1993, miniseries)
- Tomorrow People, The (franchise):
  - Tomorrow People, The (1973–1979, UK)
  - Tomorrow People, The (1992–1995, Canada)
  - Tomorrow People, The (2013–2014)
- Total Recall 2070 (1999, Canada)
- Tracker (2001–2002, Canada)
- Tremors (franchise):
  - Tremors (2003)
  - Tremors 4: The Legend Begins (2004, prequel, film)
- Triangle, The (2005, miniseries)
- Tribe, The (franchise):
  - New Tomorrow, The (2006, New Zealand, Tribe, The sequel)
  - Tribe, The (1999–2003, New Zealand)
- Tripods, The (1984–1985, UK/Australia)
- Tru Calling (2003–2005) (elements of science fiction)
- Travelers (2016–2018, Canada)
- Turnabout (1979) IMDb
- Twice in a Lifetime (1999–2001, Canada)
- Twilight Zone, The (anthology) (franchise):
  - Twilight Zone, The (1959–1964, anthology)
  - Twilight Zone, The (1985–1989, anthology)
  - Twilight Zone, The (2002-2003, anthology)
  - Twilight Zone, The (2019-2020, anthology)
- Twisted Tales (1996)

Animated

- Tales from the Cryptkeeper (1993–1997, anthology, animated)
- Team Galaxy a.k.a. Le Collège de l'Espace (France) a.k.a. Galaxie Académie (Canada) (2006–2007, France/Italy/Canada, animated)
- Teen Titans (franchise):
  - Teen Titans (2003–2006, animated)
  - New Teen Titans (2012, animated)
  - Teen Titans Go! (2013–present, animated)
- Teenage Mutant Ninja Turtles a.k.a. TMNT (franchise):
  - Teenage Mutant Ninja Turtles (1987–1996, US/Japan, animated)
  - Teenage Mutant Ninja Turtles (2003–2009, animated):
  - Teenage Mutant Ninja Turtles: Turtles Forever a.k.a. TMNT: Turtles Forever (2009, animated film)
  - Teenage Mutant Ninja Turtles (2012–2017, animated)
  - Rise of the Teenage Mutant Ninja Turtles (2018-2020, animated)
- Tekkaman (franchise):
  - Tekkaman: The Space Knight (1975, Japan, animated)
  - Tekkaman Blade a.k.a. Teknoman (1992–1993, Japan, animated)
  - Tenchi Universe (1995, Japan, animated)
  - Tenchi in Tokyo (1997, Japan, animated)
  - Tenchi Muyo! GXP (2002, Japan, animated)
- Terra Formars (2014, Japan, animated)
- Tetsujin-28 (franchise):
  - Tetsujin 28-go (1963–1966, Japan, animated)
  - Gigantor (1963–1966, US, adaptation, animated)
  - Shin Tetsujin 28-go (1980–1981, Japan, animated) a.k.a. New Adventures of Gigantor, The (US)
  - Tetsujin 28 FX (1992–1993, Japan, animated)
  - Tetsujin-28 (2004, Japan, animated)
- Tetsuwan Birdy: Decode (2008–2009, Japan, animated)
- Texhnolyze (2003, Japan, animated)
- Thundarr the Barbarian (1980–1982, animated)
- ThunderCats (franchise):
  - ThunderCats (1985–1990, animated)
  - ThunderCats (2011–2012, US/Japan, animated)
- Tick, The a.k.a. Tick: The Animated Series, The (1994–1996, animated) (elements of science fiction in some episodes)
- Tide-Line Blue (2005, Japan, animated)
- Time Bokan (franchise):
  - Time Bokan (1975–1976, Japan, animated)
  - Yatterman (1975–1979, Japan, animated, spin-off)
  - Zenderman (1979–1980, Japan, animated)
  - Rescueman (1980–1981, Japan, animated)
  - Yattodetaman (1981–1982, Japan, animated)
  - Gyakuten! Ippatsuman (1982–1983, Japan, animated)
  - Itadakiman (1982–1983, Japan, animated)
  - Time Bokan 2000: Kaitou Kiramekiman (2000, Japan, animated)
  - Yatterman (2008–2009, Japan, animated, remake)
- Time Jam: Valerian & Laureline (2007–2008, France/Japan, animated)
- Time Squad (2001–2003, animated)
- Time Warp Trio (2005–2006, animated)
- Titan Maximum (2009, stop-motion animation)
- TO (2009, Japan, television OVA, animated)
- Toaru Majutsu no Index (franchise):
  - Toaru Majutsu no Index (2008–2011, Japan, animated)
  - A Certain Scientific Railgun (2009–2010, Japan, animated)
- Tokyo Underground (2002, Japan, animated)
- Toonami: Total Immersion Events a.k.a. TIEs (franchise) (animated):
  - Intruder, The (2000, interactive, special, micro-series, animated)
  - Lockdown (2001, interactive, special, micro-series, animated)
  - Trapped in Hyperspace (2002, interactive, special, micro-series, animated)
  - Immortal Grand Prix a.k.a. IGPX (2003, Japan/US, interactive, special, micro-series, animated)
  - Immortal Grand Prix a.k.a. IGPX (2005–2006, Japan/US, animated)
- Tōshō Daimos (1978–1979, Japan, animated)
- Toward the Terra (2007, Japan, animated)
- Toxic Crusaders (1991, animated)
- Transformers (franchise):
  - Transformers, The a.k.a. Transformers: Generation 1 a.k.a. Transformers: G1 (1984–1987, animated)
  - Transformers: Generation 2 a.k.a. Transformers: G2 (1993–1995, modified Transformers: G1 rebroadcast, animated)
  - Transformers: The Headmasters (1987–1988, Japan, animated)
  - Transformers: Super-God Masterforce (1988–1989, Japan, animated)
  - Transformers: Victory (1989, Japan, animated)
  - Beast Wars: Transformers (1996–1999, animated)
  - Beast Wars II: Chō Seimeitai Transformers a.k.a. Beast Wars II: Super Life-form Transformers (1998, Japan, animated)
  - Beast Wars Neo (1998–1999, Japan, animated)
  - Beast Machines (1998–2000, Canada/US, animated)
  - Transformers: Robots in Disguise (2000–2001, Japan/US, animated) a.k.a. Transformers: Car Robot (Japan)
  - Transformers: Armada a.k.a. Super Robot Lifeform Transformers: Micron Legend (2001–2003, Japan, animated)
  - Transformers: Energon a.k.a. Transformers: Superlink (2004–2005, Japan, animated)
  - Transformers: Cybertron a.k.a. Transformers: Galaxy Force (2005–2006, Japan, animated)
  - Transformers Animated (2007–2009, US/Japan, animated)
  - Transformers: Prime a.k.a. Transformers: Prime – The Animated Series (2010–2012, US/Japan, animated)
  - Transformers: Rescue Bots (2012–2016, US/Japan, animated)
  - Transformers: Robots in Disguise (2015–2017, animated)
  - Transformers: Cyberverse (2018-2020, animated)
- Trider G7 (1980–1981, Japan, animated)
- Trigun (1998, Japan, animated)
- Tripping the Rift (2004–2007, Canada, animated)
- Tron: Uprising (2012–2013, animated)
- T.U.F.F. Puppy (2010-2015, animated) (elements of science fiction)
- Tytania (2008–2009, Japan, animated)
