= Shunsuke Shima =

Japanese actor

- 嶋 俊介
- Born: January 21, 1932; Tokyo City, Tokyo Prefecture, Japan
- Died: November 11, 2003 (aged 71)
- Occupations: Actor; voice actor
- Years active: 1952–2003
- Agent: Aoni Production

Shunsuke Shima (嶋 俊介, Shima Shunsuke; born January 21, 1932 – November 11, 2003) was a Japanese actor.

== Filmography ==
=== Television animation ===
1960s

- Tetsujin 28-go (1963) – Inspector Bera
- Perman (1967) – Mr. Koike
- Osomatsu-kun (1967)
- Kaibutsu-kun (1968)
- Kamui the Ninja (1969) – Miwata

1970s

- Ashita no Joe (1970) – Hyoromatsu
- Ganba no Bōken (1975) – Tsuburi
- Blocker Gundan 4 Machine Blaster (1976) – Professor Mino
- Invincible Steel Man Daitarn 3 (1978) – Edwin
- Zenderman (1979) – A governor‐general

1980s

- Doraemon (1980) – Shizuka's uncle
- Rescueman (1980) – Chiba Shusaku Narimasa
- Gatchaman Fighter (1980) – Kentarō Washio
- Dash Kappei (1981) – Akane's father
- Yattodetaman (1981) – Major Horikawa
- Six God Combination Godmars (1981) – Kir
- Gyakuten! Ippatsuman (1982) – Zeninashi
- The Mysterious Cities of Gold (1982) – Andreth
- Magical Princess Minky Momo (1982) – Kent
- Armored Trooper Votoms (1983) – Shimkas Futtor
- Bagi, the Monster of Mighty Nature (1984) – Ryo's father
- Metal Armor Dragonar (1987) – Jim Austin
- Oishinbo (1988) – Hideo Tanimura
- The Three-Eyed One (1989) – Dr. Kenmochi

1990s

- Nintama Rantarō (1993) – Shinkuro Hashimoto
- Saint Tail (1995) – Asakura

2000s

- Argento Soma (2000) – Makarov
- Detective Conan (2003) – Nagumo

=== OVA ===
- Legend of the Galactic Heroes (1989) – Legrange
- Genesis Survivor Gaiarth (1992) – Landis
- Armitage III (1995) – Dr. Asakura

=== Theatrical animation ===
- The Mystery of Mamo (1978) – Personnel (Dietman)
- Golgo 13: The Professional (1983) - Pago
- Mobile Suit Gundam: Char's Counterattack (1988) – Adenauer Paraya
- Slam Dunk: Shohoku's Greatest Challenge! (1995) – Ofuna-sensei

=== Video games ===
- Mitsumete Knight (1998) – Gustav Benindandy

=== Dubbing ===
==== Live-action ====
- Amadeus – Count Von Strack (Roderick Cook)
- A Better Tomorrow II – Lung Sei (Dean Shek)
- Blue Steel – Frank Turner (Philip Bosco)
- Brainstorm – Hal Abramson (Joe Dorsey)
- Captain America – President Tom Kimball (Ronny Cox)
- Combat! – Pvt. "Doc" Walton (Conlan Carter)
- Die Hard – Dwayne T. Robinson (Paul Gleason)
- ER – Mr. Thurnhurst (Franklin Cover)
- Fist of Fury – Fan Junxia (Tien Feng)
- For Love or Money – Mr. Harry Wegman (Michael Tucker)
- Gunfight at the O.K. Corral (1977 NTV edition) – Virgil Earp (John Hudson)
- Halloween II (1988 NTV edition) – Graham (Jeffrey Kramer)
- The Hitcher (1987 TV Tokyo edition) – Sergeant Starr (John M. Jackson)
- I Dream of Jeannie – Captain/Major Roger Healey (Bill Daily) (2nd voice)
- Jennifer 8 – Chief Citrine (Kevin Conway)
- Joe Kidd (1975 NTV edition) – Mitchell (Gregory Walcott)
- Seven Golden Men (1982 TV Tokyo edition) – Bank Manager (José Suárez)
- Tower of Death – Lewis (Roy Horan)
- Wall Street (1991 Fuji TV edition) – Harold Salt (Saul Rubinek)

==== Animation ====
- Batman: The Animated Series – Mayor Hamilton Hill
- Darkwing Duck — Bushroot
