= Time Bokan: Royal Revival =

Japanese original video animation

タイムボカン王道復古 (Taimubokan Ōdōfukko)
- Genre: Adventure, science fiction
- Created by: Tatsunoko Production Planning Office
- Original video animation
- Directed by: Akira Shigino
- Produced by: Ippei Kuri
- Written by: Satoru Akahori; Mayori Sekijima
- Music by: Masaaki Jinbo; Masayuki Yamamoto
- Studio: Tatsunoko Production
- Licensed by: NA: Sentai Filmworks
- Released: November 26, 1993 – January 1, 1994
- Runtime: 30 minutes
- Episodes: 2

Time Bokan: Royal Revival (タイムボカン王道復古, Taimubokan Ōdōfukko) is a 1993 original video animation of the popular 1970s anime Time Bokan.

This was the last installment of the series to feature Kei Tomiyama as the narrator. He was replaced in Time Bokan 2000: Kaitou Kiramekiman by Junpei Takiguchi and Kōichi Yamadera in the 2008 remake of Yatterman. The OVAs were initially licensed by Central Park Media and was released on DVD in 2005. Sentai Filmworks has now licensed the OVA series.

== Episodes ==
There were only two volumes released as listed below.

No.	Title	Original release date
1	"Time Bokan Royal Revival I - Chikichiki Ugougo Bogeboge Machine Wild Race" "Chikichiki ugougo hogehogemashīn mō rēsu" (チキチキ・ウゴウゴ・ホゲホゲマシーン猛レース)	November 26, 1993
2	"Time Bokan Royal Revival II - Alumni Reunion in the Tatsunokon Kingdom" "Yattāman tatsunokkon ōkoku de dōsōkaida koron" (ヤッターマン タツノッコン王国で同窓会だコロン)	January 1, 1994

== Cast ==
- Majo, Doronjo, Mujo, Atasha, Milenjo, Munmun, Yanyan: - Noriko Ohara
- Glocky, Boyakki, Tobokkee, Sekobicchi, Jurii Kokematsu, Kosuinen, Dasainen - Jōji Yanami
- Walther, Tonzura, Donjuro, Twarusky, Alan Sukadon, Kyokantin, Tonmentan - Kazuya Tatekabe
- Dokurobe, Dogurobe - Junpei Takiguchi
- Gekigasky, Baron Donfanfan, 2-3 - Masayuki Yamamoto
- Daiko-kami - Hiroaki Tanabe
- Ohana-chan - Kumiko Takizawa
- Fortune Teller, Female High Schooler, Orokabu, Oshii Person - Yōko Yano
- Salaryman, Monzaemon, Bikkuri Mondo, Ikemasuitachi - Katsumi Suzuki
- Koyama Cameraman - Takao Koyama
- Narration, Sasayaki Reporter, Tommy Yama, Turnabout King, Buta, Yatterwan FZ - Kei Tomiyama
- Ohayashi People - Hiroto Kōmoto, Kahiro Okuya
- Gan-chan (Yatterman-1) - Yoshiko Ōta
- Ai-chan (Yatterman-2) - Mari Okamoto
- Omochama - Reiko Katsura
- Ken the Eagle, Tekkaman - Katsuji Mori
- Jun the Swan, Tenburu - Kazuko Sugiyama
- Polymar - Kazuyuki Sogabe
- Casshern - Ikuo Nishikawa
- Loliconda, Sailor Munmun, Obanbar - Naoko Matsui
