= Noriko Tsukase =

Japanese voice actress and singer (1945–1989)

- つかせ のりこ
- Born: Noriko Hara (原 紀子) (née Tsukase (塚瀬)); December 23, 1945; Kanagawa Prefecture, Japan
- Died: May 15, 1989 (aged 43); Tachikawa, Tokyo, Japan
- Other name: Noko (ノコ)
- Occupations: Voice actress; singer
- Years active: 1969–1989
- Agent: Aoni Production

Noriko Tsukase (つかせのりこ, Tsukase Noriko; December 23, 1945 – May 15, 1989) was a Japanese voice actress and chanson singer active throughout the 1970s and 1980s.

Her most popular roles included Spank in Ohayō! Spank, Miss Alphonne in the original Cutie Honey television series and Non (as well as Furu-Furu the cat) in Majokko Megu-chan.

Other notable voice acting roles of hers are Danko-sensei in Kosoku Denjin Albegas, Kintaro Isu in The Song of Tentomushi, Tamu-Tamu in Temple the Balloonist, Hajime in Doteraman, Harubo in Ippatsuman, Shota in Plawres Sanshiro, Jacky in Jacky the Bear Cub, Marusu (aka the Sphinx's daughter) in Unico in the Island of Magic, Teko in Mahou Shōjo Lalabel, Tera in Future Boy Conan, and Panny (Pamie) in Adventures of the Little Koala.

In addition, she had a number of minor or guest roles in series such as Devilman, Dragon Ball, Tokimeki Tonight, Gatchaman, Saber Rider and the Star Sheriffs, Heidi, Girl of the Alps, Dororon Enma-kun and Himitsu no Akko-chan.

== Biography ==
Tsukase was born in Kanagawa Prefecture, Japan on December 23, 1945.

As a sophomore in high school, she came in second place in a prefectural broadcasting contest. After being told she had an "interesting voice", she thought, "let me try doing what I love", and after graduating from high school, entered the Tokyo Talent Center.

=== Career ===
She performed in tent theaters and worked in entertainment career activities once she graduated from Tokyo Talent Center.

Afterwards she worked as a disc jockey for Radio Kanto. In 1970, working as the narrator on Dekirukana led her to begin her career as a voice actress, making her debut as an anime voice actress with Mon Chéri CoCo.

She started being affiliated with Aoni Production after having worked with Osaka TV Talent Bureau.

=== Final years ===
In later years, she had a career as a chanson singer, particularly being known for her version of "Rokudenashi".

In late January 1989, she retired from all of her regular and ongoing acting roles due to a hospitalization.

=== Death ===
Tsukase died from rectal cancer on May 15, 1989, at the age of 43.

== Filmography ==
=== Television animation ===
List of voice performances in television animation
Year	Title	Role	Notes	Source
1972	Mon Chéri CoCo	Natalie		
1972	Devilman	Gande		
1973	Science Ninja Team Gatchaman	Boy, Child		
1973	Cutie Honey	Alphonne Louis Steinbeck III		
1973	Demetan Croaker, The Boy Frog	Player, Nyorokichi, Morita, Elekichi, Bamboo		
1973	Doraemon	Debuko		
1973	Babel II	Additional voices		
1973	Microid S	Additional voices		
1974	Heidi, Girl of the Alps	Tinette		
1974	Calimero	Calimero's mother, ChuuChuu	First voice	
1974	Great Mazinger	Shinichi Namura	Ep. 7	
1974	Getter Robo	Miyuki Saotome, Princess Gora	Ep. 22	
1974	The Song of Tentomushi	Kintaro Isshu		
1974	Dororon Enma-kun	Akira-kun	Ep. 20	
1974	Majokko Megu-chan	Non Gō, Furu Furu		
1975	Getter Robo G	Snake King Demon	Childhood	
1975	Steel Jeeg	Akira		
1975	Shogun in His Boyhood	Tokuchiyo Abe		
1975	Maya the Honey Bee	Ladybugs, Helga, Female Praying Mantis, Cricket, Female Grass Spider, Additional voices		
1976	Dino Mech Gaiking	Hachiro, Rosa	Rosa in Ep. 3	
1976	Chōdenji Robo Combattler V	Empress Janera, Chie Ichinoki		
1976	3000 Leagues in Search of Mother	Additional voices		
1976	Blocker Gundan 4 Machine Blaster	Jinta Hayami		
1976	Paul's Miraculous Adventure	Tom		
1976	Magne Robo Gakeen	Kaoru Bizen		
1976	Machine Hayabusa	Additional voices		
1976	Ikkyū-san	Additional voices		
1977	Nobody's Boy: Remi	Benjamin Akande		
1977	Ippatsu Kanta-kun	Tomoe, Chīko's mother, Kotarō		
1977	Monarch: The Big Bear of Tallac	Jacky		
1977	Jetter Mars	Additional voices		
1977	Balatack	Franco, Pakapaka	Pakapaka in Ep. 16	
1977	Temple the Balloonist	Tomtom		
1977	Yatterman	Queen, Kawatarō		
1977	Wakusei Robo Danguard Ace	Tsutomu Tsukishima	Ep. 18	
1978	Space Pirate Captain Harlock	Masu Tsunajima, Mezon, Miyu, Nurem, Sujiko Nemin, Twin Sister	Sujiko in Episodes 2 and 7, Nurem in Episodes 5-6, Miyu in Ep. 28, Twin Sister in Ep. 34	
1978	Starzinger	Mira, Ponpo	Mira in Ep. 12, Ponpo in Ep. 24	
1978	Galaxy Express 999	Tsuru	Ep. 11	
1978	New Star of the Giants	Additional voices		
1978	The Story of Perrine	Additional voices		
1978	The Adventures of the Little Prince	Cerca		
1978	Majokko Tickle	Takeshi		
1978	Future Boy Conan	Tera	Main role	
1979	Bannertail: The Story of Gray Squirrel	Banner	Lead role	
1979	New Star of the Giants II	Additional voices		
1979	Zenderman	Puss in Boots	Ep. 12	
1979	The Age of Dinosaurs	Chobi	Television film	
1979	Maegami-Tarō	Child of an Ushi-oni/Gyūki	Television special	
1979	Invincible Steel Man Daitarn 3	Commander Z		
1980	Tomorrow's Joe 2	Chūkichi		
1980	Ganbare Gonbe	Santarō		
1980	Lalabel, the Magical Girl	Teko		
1980	The White Whale of Mū	Gaku Shirakawa (Garakusha)		
1980	King Arthur: Prince on White Horse	Hans		
1981	Hello! Spank	Spank	Lead role	
1981	The Monster Kid	Rodan		
1981	The Hippo Director's Zoo Diary	Female Zookeeper	Television special	
1981	Honey Honey no Suteki na Bouken	Additional voices		
1981	Miss Machiko	Kame		
1981	Dogtanian and the Three Muskehounds	Francois		
1982	Asari-chan	Ibara Yabunokouji, Takayuki	First voice of Ibara Yabunokouji	
1982	Gyakuten! Ippatsuman	Harubo		
1982	Tokimeki Tonight	Emiko Takamiyama	Ep. 21	
1982	Dr. Slump & Arale-chan	Namaneko	Ep. 57	
1982	Tonde Mon Pe	Nandaro		
1982	Magical Princess Minky Momo	Lucas	Ep. 19	
1982	Anime Shout of the Wilderness	Additional voices		
1983	Lightspeed Electroid Albegas	Prof. Danko Kibi		
1983	Stop!! Hibari-kun!	Kaji's mother		
1983	Space Cobra	Koro	Ep. 26	
1983	Doctor Mambo & Kaitou Jibako: With Love from Space	Martha	Television special	
1983	Serendipity the Pink Dragon	Akanatssu		
1983	Nanako SOS	Koenji	Ep. 30	
1983	Perman	Female Pickpocket, Old Lady, Satoru, Harumi		
1983	Boku Patalliro!	Additional voices		
1983	Plawres Sanshiro	Shōta Yamaguchi		
1983	Manga Japanese History	Additional voices		
1983	Mīmu Iro Iro Yume no Tabi	Tamasaburō, Konpei		
1983	Manga Aesop Monogatari	Tan		
1984	Gu Gu Ganmo	Granny Oyone	Ep. 34	
1984	Adventures of the Little Koala	Pamie Penguin	Main role	
1984	Fist of the North Star	Jirō	Episodes 9-10	
1984	Star Musketeer Bismark	Koruna, Bella, Dreamy	Koruna in Ep. 15, Bella in Ep. 20, Dreamy in Ep. 34	
1984	Sōya Monogatari	Kenji		
1984	Little Memole	Jimmy	Episodes 24-25	
1984	Sherlock Hound	Parrot	Ep. 23	
1985	GeGeGe no Kitarō	Akaname, Hideo, Okada, Toshio, Kenji, Akio, Hacha	First voice of Akaname	
1985	Hai Step Jun	Kichinosuke		
1985	Button Nose	Soir		
1986	Ultraman Kids Proverb Stories	Ruuki		
1986	Ganbare, Kickers!	Kenta Ishii		
1986	Doteraman	Doteraman	Lead role	
1986	Pro Golfer Saru	Little Flying Monkey		
1987	New Maple Town Stories: Palm Town Chapter	Gouta, Bat Tagu	Bat Tagu in Ep. 35	
1987	Dragon Ball	Konkichi	Ep. 83	
1988	Kiteretsu Daihyakka	Thomas Edison		
1988	Sakigake!! Otokojuku	Hidemaro Gokukōji		
1988	City Hunter 2	Lucifer Rei	Ep. 12	
1988	Tatakae!! Ramenman	Annin (Hangnyin)	Ep. 26	
1988	Tsurupika Hagemaru	Hagemaru Hageda	First voice	
1988	The Secret of Akko-chan	Ganmo Unohana, Goma	Ganmo Unohana in Episodes 1-15, Goma in Episodes 1-18	

=== Theatrical animation ===
List of voice performances in theatrical animation
Year	Title	Role	Notes	Source
1974	The Great Adventures of Kikansha Yaemon D51	Hanuata		
1974	Majokko Megu-chan	Non Gō		
1975	Majokko Megu-chan: Messenger from the Moon	Non Gō		
1977	The Wild Swans	Prince		
1978	Space Pirate Captain Harlock: Mystery of the Arcadia	Masu Tsunajima		
1980	Magical Girl Lalabel: The Sea Calls for a Summer Vacation	Teruko Takemura/Teko		
1981	Ashita no Joe 2	Additional voices		
1982	Hello! Spank	Spank	Lead role	
1982	Haguregumo	Ango		
1983	Aesop's Fable	Hare		
1983	Unico in the Island of Magic	Marusu/Sphinx's daughter		
1985	Little Memole	Jimmy		
1986	Opening the Door	Sumega		
1987	New Maple Town Stories: Palm Town Chapter	Gouta		
1988	Sakigake!! Otokojuku	Hidemaro Gokukōji		

=== Original video animation (OVA) ===
- Birth (1984) – Village Girl/Child

== Successors ==
- Kazuko Sugiyama – Tsurupika Hagemaru: Hagemaru
- Yūko Mita – Himitsu no Akko-chan: Gammo
- Chie Satō – Himitsu no Akko-chan: Goma
- Akari Hibino – Super Robot Wars: Chōdenji Robo Combattler V: Chie Ichinoki
- Yuki Matsuoka – Super Robot Wars: Chōdenji Robo Combattler V: Empress Janera
- Yuri Amano – Super Robot Wars: Getter Robo: Miyuki Saotome
- Minami Takayama – Heidi, Girl of the Alps: Tinette
- Hiroko Emori – Sakigake!! Otokojuku: Hidemaro Gokukouji
