= Takao Koyama =

Japanese screenwriter

- 小山 高生
- Born: April 21, 1948 (age 78); Akishima, Tokyo, Japan
- Occupation: Screenwriter
- Years active: 1972-present

Takao Koyama (Japanese: 小山 高生, Hepburn: Koyama Takao; born April 21, 1948, in Akishima, Tokyo) is a Japanese screenwriter and novelist focusing on anime productions. His name was written as 小山 高男 until 1987.

== Career ==
He graduated from Waseda University in 1972 and joined to Tatsunoko Production as a story creator and a screenwriter. He left from Tatsunoko in 1975, but he was related to the Time Bokan series, one of the most successful anime series of Tatsunoko, from Time Bokan in 1975 to the last series, Itadakiman in 1983. After leaving from Tatsunoko, he wrote several screenplays such as Captain Tsubasa, Dragon Ball and Saint Seiya of Toei Animation.

In parallel with works as screenwriter, he is endeavoring to bring up young talents. In 1986, he found "Anime Scenario House" to train the young anime scenario writers. By 1987, young screenwriters such as Satoru Akahori, Hiroyuki Kawasaki, Katsuyuki Sumisawa, Keiko Nobumoto and Aya Matsui graduated from Koyama's school. The school became Brother Noppo, company to support screenwriters, in 1988.

Koyama authored a remake of Akira Toriyama's Soldier of Savings Cashman manga, that was illustrated by Katsuyoshi Nakatsuru and serialized in V Jump from June 1997 to December 1998.

== Works ==
=== As chief writer ===
Year	Title	Studio	Note
1981–1982	Yattodetaman	Tatsunoko	Part of Time Bokan franchise.
1981–1982	Urusei Yatsura	Studio Pierrot	Episode 1 to 21. Replaced by Kazunori Ito.
1982–1983	Ippatsuman	Tatsunoko	Part of Time Bokan franchise.
1982	Don Dracula	Tezuka Productions	—
1984	Starzan S	Tatsunoko	—
1985–1986	Showa Aho Zōshi: Kanuke Ichiban!	Tatsunoko	—
1986–1988	Saint Seiya	Toei Animation	Episode 1 to 73. Replaced by Yoshiyuki Suga.
1986–1987	Doteraman	Tatsunoko	—
1987	Red Photon Zillion	Tatsunoko	—
1987–1989	Dragon Ball	Toei Animation	Episode 83 to 153. Replacing Toshiki Inoue.
1987	Project A-Ko 2	A.P.P.P.	Sequel to Project A-Ko.
1989–1990	Kojiro of the Fuma Clan	J.C. Staff; Animate Film	—
1989–1990	Legendary Idol Eriko	Ashi Productions	—
1989–1996	Dragon Ball Z	Toei Animation	Sequel to Dragon Ball.
1990–1991	Mashin Hero Wataru 2	Sunrise	Sequel to Mashin Hero Wataru.
1990–1991	Figures of Happiness	Production I.G	—
1991	I Am Chokkaku!!	Studio Pierrot	—
1992–1993	Floral Magician Mary Bell	Ashi Productions	With Hideki Mitsui.
1993–1994	The Brave Express Might Gaine	Sunrise	Part of Yūsha franchise.
1993–1994	Willow Town	E&G Films	—
1995	Slayers	J.C. Staff; E&G Films	First season only.
1996	The Life and Adventures of Santa Claus	Studio Deen	—
1998	Legend of Basara	Yumeta Company	—
2001–2002	Offside	Ashi Productions	—
2009–2015	Dragon Ball Z Kai	Toei Animation	
