= Noriko Ohara =

Japanese actress (1935–2024)

- 小原 乃梨子
- Born: Noriko Tobe (戸部 法子) (née Noriko Ohara (小原 乃梨子)); October 2, 1935; Tokyo Prefecture, Japan
- Died: July 12, 2024 (aged 88)
- Other name: Nokko (ノッコ)
- Occupations: Actress; voice actress; narrator
- Years active: 1955–2024
- Agent: 81 Produce (final affiliation)
- Notable credit(s): Doraemon as Nobita Nobi; Time Bokan as Majo; Yatterman and its 2008 remake as Doronjo; Zenderman as Muujo; Rescueman as Atasha; Yattodetaman as Mirengo-hime; Gyakuten! Ippatsuman as Mun-Mun; Itadakiman as Yan-Yan; Time Bokan 2000: Kaitou Kiramekiman as Ruuju; Future Boy Conan as Conan; Heidi, Girl of the Alps as Peter; Wacky Races as Penelope Pitstop; Urusei Yatsura as Oyuki; Super Dimension Fortress Macross as Claudia LaSalle
- Spouse: Shinichi Tobe (戸部信一) (died 2023)
- Children: Atsuo Tobe (son)
- Family: Eiji Ohara (father)
- Website: www.oharanoriko.com

Noriko Tobe (戸部 法子, Tobe Noriko; October 2, 1935 – July 12, 2024), née Ohara, better known by her stage name Noriko Ohara (小原 乃梨子, Ohara Noriko), was a Japanese actress and narrator.

She is best known for the roles of Nobita Nobi (Doraemon), all of the female lead villains in the Time Bokan series (including Doronjo in both the original Yatterman and its remake), Conan (Future Boy Conan), Peter (Heidi, Girl of the Alps), Penelope Pitstop (Wacky Races), Oyuki (Urusei Yatsura), and Claudia LaSalle (Super Dimension Fortress Macross).

== Career ==
She was previously affiliated with Aoni Production and Production Baobab, but later went freelance.

In 2007, she won the Achievement Award at the 1st Seiyu Awards and in 2013, won the Synergy Award for maximizing the appeal of voice-acting in a work as a whole at the 7th Seiyu Awards.

== Death ==
Ohara died following an unsuccessful illness treatment on July 12, 2024, at the age of 88.

Earlier that same year in March, she attended an event for acquaintances, and the next month, she had met up with Eiko Yamada, Sachiko Chijimatsu, and Mari Shimizu. In June, she met up again with Yamada. But according to close friend and Doraemon co-star Michiko Nomura, Ohara had been secretly battling an illness for the past few years and started living at a care facility.

The news of her death was officially announced by her agency 81 Produce on July 23.

=== Tributes ===
Several tributes and messages of condolence from fans, voice actors, colleagues, and entertainment industry figures were shared in the days following the announcement of her death.

At the end of the broadcast of Doraemon on July 27, 2024, a video with a eulogy message for Ohara was played featuring scenes with her voice as Nobita.

In October 2024, the "Noriko Ohara Farewell Ceremony", was held. Her son Atsuo Tobe was the representative organizer. Those in attendance included Nomura, Wasabi Mizuta, Yumi Kakazu, Michio Hazama, and Yū Mizushima. At the start of the service, footage from the anime she appeared in as a voice actress, including Doraemon, alongside the theme songs from each, were played, with flowers laid all around.

In March 2025, she and Doraemon co-star Nobuyo Ōyama posthumously received the "Special Award from the Chairman" in the 48th Japan Academy Film Prize for "outstanding contributions and outstanding results in the film industry over many years".

== Personal life ==
Her son is Sunrise animator Atsuo Tobe.

== Filmography ==
=== Television animation ===
List of voice performances in television animation
Year	Title	Role	Notes	Source
1963	Astro Boy	Additional voice		
1964	Wolf Boy Ken	Additional voice		
1965	Dolphin Prince	Dolphin Prince	Lead role	
1965	W3	Additional voice		
1966	Harris no Kaze	Megane		
1966	Hang On! Marine Kid	Marine Kid	Lead role	
1967	Gokū no Daibōken	Mimi		
1967	Sally the Witch	Ken Kanagawa	Ep. 12	
1967	Donkikko	Ayame		
1968	GeGeGe no Kitarō	Additional voice		
1969	Undersea Boy Marine	Marine Boy, Carmen (Fake Marine)	Lead role	
1969	Ninpū Kamui Gaiden	Santa		
1969	The Genie Family	Rumiko Tachibana		
1970	Sazae-san	Kōichi Ishida		
1970	Moomin	Additional voice		
1970	Attack No. 1	Cathy		
1971	Andersen Stories	Ferone the Ice Maiden	Eps. 38–40	
1971	Genius Bakabon	Additional voice		
1971	Kunimatsu-sama no Otōridai	Megane		
1971	Marvelous Melmo	Lady General, Maruko	Lady General in Ep. 3, Maruko in Ep. 14	
1971	GeGeGe no Kitarō	Additional voice		
1972	Hazedon	Tabou		
1972	The Gutsy Frog	Mrs. Kaizuka		
1973	Doraemon	Tamako Nobi		
1973	Wansa-kun	Wansa	Lead role	
1973	Babel II	Additional voice	Ep. 37	
1973	Zero Tester	Hiroshi		
1973	Bōken Korobokkuru	Love Love		
1974	Alps no Shōjo Heidi	Peter		
1974	Mazinger Z	Erika/Espionage R1	Ep. 67	
1975	La Seine no Hoshi	Catherine		
1975	Maya the Honey Bee	Ifui, Merry		
1975	Arabian Nights: Sinbad's Adventures	Sinbad		
1975–76	Time Bokan	Majo, Sinbad		
1976	3000 Leagues in Search of Mother	Concetta		
1976	Machine Hayabusa	Mary Wells	Second voice	
1976	Dino Mech Gaiking	Erica	Ep. 21	
1976	Little Lulu and Her Little Friends	Wilbur, Martha		
1977–79	Yatterman	Doronjo		
1977	UFO Robot Grendizer	Rubina		
1977–78	Voltes V	Hiyoshi Goh, Ri Katherine		
1977	Nobody's Boy: Remi	Mattia		
1977	Ippatsu Kanta-kun	Shōgo, Bob Kent		
1977	Temple the Balloonist	Sammy	Ep. 14	
1978	Space Pirate Captain Harlock	Miime, President		
1978	Future Boy Conan	Conan	Lead role	
1978	Invincible Steel Man Daitarn 3	Commander Jeera	Ep. 8	
1978	Sci-Fi West Saga Starzinger	Balaran, Beramis		
1978–79	Lupin the 3rd Part II	Emanuelle Poirot, Bolonco	Emanuelle Poirot in Ep. 52, Bolonco in Ep. 72	
1978	Space Battleship Yamato II	Savellah (Invidia), Jiro Shima		
1979	Galaxy Express 999	Lyuse, Maetal of Mud	Maetal of Mud in Ep. 18	
1979	Zenderman	Muujo		
1979–2005	Doraemon	Nobita Nobi, Young Nobisuke Nobi, Nobisuke Nobi Jr.	Main role	
1979	The Adventures of Marco Polo	Boy, Raja's son		
1979	The Ultraman	Takashi	Ep. 3	
1979	Daikyōryū Jidai	Additional voice	Television film	
1980	Rescueman	Atasha		
1980	Space Emperor God Sigma	Shota Kasuga, Supreme Commander Teral		
1980	Astro Boy	President Rag	Ep. 11	
1981	Yattodetaman	Mirenjo-hime, Do-Re-Mi Otama A, Doronjo		
1981	Belle and Sebastian	Sebastian	Lead role	
1981–86	Urusei Yatsura	Oyuki		
1982–83	Gyakuten! Ippatsuman	Mun-Mun		
1982	Don Dracula	Advisor	Ep. 2	
1982	Songoku Flies Over Silk Road!!	Female Rakshasa	Television special	
1982	Dash Kappei	Marilyn		
1982	Esteban: Child of the Sun	Roca	Ep. 13	
1982–83	The Super Dimension Fortress Macross	Claudia LaSalle, Narrator		
1982	Tokimeki Tonight	Sheila Eto		
1983	Itadakiman	Yan-Yan, Dark Angel		
1983	Genesis Climber Mospeada	Refless		
1984	Cat's Eye 2	Yuuki Tamao		
1985	Choriki Robo Galatt	Kounetsu		
1987	Doteraman	Misao Suzuki		
1989	The Laughing Salesman	Kanako/Landlady	Ep. 99	
1990	The Adventures of Hutch the Honeybee	Nococo		
1991–2019	Let's Go! Anpanman	Ice Queen, Black Rose Queen	Second voice of Ice Queen, First voice of Black Rose Queen	
1993	Salad Juu Yuushi Tomatoman	Queen Butterfly		
1998	Bomberman B-Daman Bakugaiden	Dark Baaya		
1999	The Legend of the End of the Era: Wonderful Tatsunoko Land -The Flying Saucer Alien UBO-	Doronjo, Muujo		
2000	Time Bokan 2000: Kaitou Kiramekiman	Ruuju, Doronjo, Majo		
2003	KochiKame: Tokyo Beat Cops	Sakura		
2006	The Snow Queen	Wind User		
2008	Yatterman	Doronjo		
2011	Nichijou – My Ordinary Life	Apartment building, Narration	Ep. 4	
2015	Yatterman Night	Doronjo	Ep. 12	

=== Theatrical animation ===
List of voice performances in theatrical animation
Year	Title	Role	Notes	Source
1968	The Great Adventure of Horus, Prince of the Sun	Chiro the Squirrel		
1971	Do It! Yasuji's Pornorama	Additional voice		
1974	Alps no Shōjo Heidi	Peter		
1978	Thumbelina	Prince		
1978	Space Pirate Captain Harlock: The Mystery of the Arcadia	Additional voice		
1979	Alps no Shōjo Heidi	Peter		
1979	Starzinger	Beramis		
1979	Galaxy Express 999	Crown, Miime		
1979	Future Boy Conan	Conan		
1980	Doraemon: Nobita's Dinosaur	Nobita Nobi		
1980	Zenderman	Additional voice		
1980	Nobody's Boy: Remi	Mattia		
1980	3000 Leagues in Search of Mother	Concetta		
1980	Makoto-chan	Mama		
1980	Cyborg 009: Legend of the Super Galaxy	Saba		
1981	Doraemon: The Records of Nobita, Spaceblazer	Nobita Nobi		
1981	Rescueman: Atasha's Wedding Ceremony	Majo, Doronjo, Muujo, Atasha	Short film	
1981	Doraemon: What Am I for Momotarō?	Nobita Nobi	Short film	
1981	Adieu Galaxy Express 999	Miime		
1982	Doraemon: Nobita and the Haunts of Evil	Nobita Nobi		
1983	Urusei Yatsura: Only You	Oyuki		
1983	Doraemon: Nobita and the Castle of the Undersea Devil	Nobita Nobi		
1983	Crusher Joe	Ricky		
1984	Future Boy Conan: The Big Giant Robot's Resurrection	Conan		
1984	Doraemon: Nobita's Great Adventure into the Underworld	Nobita Nobi		
1984	Macross: Do You Remember Love?	Claudia LaSalle		
1985	Urusei Yatsura 3: Remember My Love	Oyuki		
1985	Doraemon: Nobita's Little Star Wars	Nobita Nobi		
1986	Doraemon: Nobita and the Steel Troops	Nobita Nobi		
1987	Doraemon: Nobita and the Knights on Dinosaurs	Nobita Nobi		
1988	Doraemon: The Record of Nobita's Parallel Visit to the West	Nobita Nobi		
1988	Urusei Yatsura: The Final Chapter	Oyuki		
1989	Doraemon: Nobita and the Birth of Japan	Nobita Nobi		
1989	Dorami-chan: Mini-Dora SOS!!!	Nobisuke Nobi Jr.	Short film	
1990	Doraemon: Nobita and the Animal Planet	Nobita Nobi		
1991	Doraemon: Nobita's Dorabian Nights	Nobita Nobi		
1991	Dorami-chan: Wow, The Kid Gang of Bandits!	Nobihei	Short film	
1991	Urusei Yatsura: Always My Darling	Oyuki		
1992	Doraemon: Nobita and the Kingdom of Clouds	Nobita Nobi		
1993	Doraemon: Nobita and the Tin Labyrinth	Nobita Nobi		
1994	Doraemon: Nobita's Three Visionary Swordsmen	Nobita Nobi / Nobitanian		
1995	Doraemon: Nobita's Diary of the Creation of the World	Nobita Nobi		
1996	Doraemon: Nobita and the Galaxy Super-express	Nobita Nobi		
1997	Doraemon: Nobita and the Spiral City	Nobita Nobi		
1998	Doraemon: Nobita's Great Adventure in the South Seas	Nobita Nobi		
1998	Doraemon Comes Back	Nobita Nobi	Short film	
1999	Doraemon: Nobita Drifts in the Universe	Nobita Nobi		
1999	Nobita's the Night Before a Wedding	Nobita Nobi, Future Nobita Nobi	Short film	
2000	Doraemon: Nobita and the Legend of the Sun King	Nobita Nobi		
2000	A Grandmother's Recollections	Nobita Nobi	Short film	
2001	Doraemon: Nobita and the Winged Braves	Nobita Nobi		
2001	Good Luck! Gian!!	Nobita Nobi	Short film	
2002	Doraemon: Nobita in the Robot Kingdom	Nobita Nobi		
2002	The Day When I Was Born	Nobita Nobi	Short film	
2003	Doraemon: Nobita and the Windmasters	Nobita Nobi		
2004	Doraemon: Nobita in the Wan-Nyan Spacetime Odyssey	Nobita Nobi		
2008	Let's Go! Anpanman: Rinrin the Fairy's Secret	Ice Queen		
2009	Gekijō-ban Yattāman Shin Yattāmeka dai Shūgō! Omocha no kuni de Daisakusenda Koron!	Doronjo		

=== Original video animation (OVA) ===
List of voice performances in original video animation
Year	Title	Role	Notes	Source
1978	Doraemon: The Fishing Pond in My Study Room	Nobita Nobi	Debut role as Nobita Nobi	
1986	Superdimensional Romanesque Samy: Missing 99	Witch from the Fairy Tale World		
1987	The Super Dimension Fortress Macross: Flash Back 2012	Claudia LaSalle		
1987	Urusei Yatsura: Inaba the Dreammaker	Oyuki		
1987	Kaze to Ki no Uta: Sanctus	Serge Battour		
1987	The Polar Bear	Mother		
1988	Urusei Yatsura: Raging Sherbet	Oyuki		
1989	Crusher Joe: The Ice Prison	Ricky		
1989	Crusher Joe: The Ultimate Weapon: Ash	Ricky		
1989	The Enemy's the Pirates!	Kali Durga	Eps 1 and 4	
1990	Sengoku Bushō Retsuden Bakufu Dōji Hissatsuman	Bijo	3 episodes	
1993	Heidi, Girl of the Alps: Alm Mountain Chapter	Peter		
1993	Heidi, Girl of the Alps: Heidi and Clara Chapter	Peter		
1993	Time Bokan: Royal Revival I: Chikichiki Ugougo Bogeboge Machine Wild Race	Majo, Doronjo, and others		
1994	Time Bokan Royal Revival II: Alumni Reunion in the Tatsunokon Kingdom	Doronjo		
1994	Doraemon: Nobita and the Future Notes	Nobita Nobi	Public education video, later released as an OVA	
2008	Urusei Yatsura: The Obstacle Course Swim Meet	Oyuki		

=== Television dramas ===
List of appearances in television dramas
Year	Title	Role	Notes	Source
2015	Doraemon, Becoming a Mother ~The Story of Nobuyo Ōyama~	Narration, herself	Portrayed in drama segments by Tsubaki Nekoze	

=== Video games ===
List of voice performances in video games
Year	Series	Role	Notes	Source
1994	Gunbird	Rouge	Arcade	
1998	Gunbird 2	Shark	Arcade	
2008	Tatsunoko vs. Capcom	Doronjo	Arcade, Wii	

=== Dubbing ===
==== Live-action ====
List of dub performances in live-action productions
Title	Role	Notes	Source
Seven Golden Men	Giorgia (Rossana Podestà)	1982 TV Tokyo edition	
Frankenstein Created Woman	Christina Kleve (Susan Denberg)	1970 TV Asahi edition	
Queen Kong	Luce Habit (Rula Lenska)	2001 Japanese edition	
Frankenstein's Army	Sacha (Luke Newberry)		

==== Animation ====
List of dub performances in animation productions
Title	Role	Notes	Source
Dumbo	Elephant Giddy (Dorothy Scott)	1978 TBS Television version	
Wacky Races	Penelope Pitstop (Janet Waldo)		
The Perils of Penelope Pitstop	Penelope Pitstop (Janet Waldo)		
Josie and the Pussycats	Valerie Brown (Barbara Pariot)		
The Rescuers	Miss Bianca (Eva Gabor)	2000 Japanese version	
Barbapapa	Barbamama, Other female characters, Narration (Ricet Barrier)	1977 TV Tokyo version	
The Rescuers Down Under	Miss Bianca (Eva Gabor)	1996 Japanese version	
A Close Shave	Wendolene Ramsbottom (Anne Reid)	1998 NHK version	

== Awards ==
Year	Award	Category	Result	Ref.
2007	1st Seiyu Awards	Achievement Award	Honored	
2013	7th Seiyu Awards	Synergy Award	Honored	
2025	48th Japan Academy Film Prize	Special Award from the Chairman	Honored	
