= Okawari-Boy StarzanS =

Japanese anime television series

- Cover art of the first Okawari-Boy StarzanS Blu-ray Volume featuring Hoshio Yumeno/StarzanS (Right) and Jun Yagami (Left).
- Also known as: StarzanS
- オカワリボーイ スターザンS
- Created by: Hiroshi Sasagawa
- Developed by: Takao Koyama
- Directed by: Hidehito Ueda
- Music by: Katsunori Ishida
- Opening theme: SHOW ME YOUR SPACE ~Kimi no Uchuu o Misete~ by Poplar
- Ending theme: Suru kimochi wa dōnatsu no naka by Ai Takano
- Country of origin: Japan
- Original language: Japanese
- No. of episodes: 34

Production
- Executive producer: Kenji Yoshida
- Producers: Kazuya Maeda (Fuji TV); Minoru Ono (Yomiko); Tsuneo Tamura (Tatsunoko)
- Production companies: Fuji Television; Tatsunoko Production

Original release
- Network: FNS (Fuji TV)
- Release: January 7 – August 25, 1984

Okawari-Boy StarzanS (オカワリボーイ スターザンS, Okawari Bōi Sutāzansu), or simply StarzanS, is an anime created by Tatsunoko Production from an idea by veteran studio director Hiroshi Sasagawa.

The series is a "mixture of Star Wars and Tarzan".

Canceled after 34 episodes due to low ratings, the series remained one of Tatsunoko Production's more obscure works until its 2017 Blu-ray release by TC Entertainment. Okawari-Boy StarzanS was Tatsunoko Production's last original anime series to air on Fuji TV until C premiered 27 years later in 2011.

"Okawari" is a Japanese expression used when the user is requesting a second helping of food or drink.

== Plot ==
There is a planet in the galactic system named Kirakira which is rich in natural greens, and there live two main tribes on the planet namely Senobi and Robot. The former live in the wooded region while the latter inhabit the desert area, who are anxious to move to and settle on the woodland for better lives. This desire causes incessant strife around the border zones. The Senobi tribe love nature and want to live in peace without being harassed by the others. On the other hand, the formerly high-tech Robot tribe have become militant as they want to expand their sphere of influence from the desert to the wooded region. A young hero of the Senobi tribe together with his supporters makes efforts to stop the feud between the two tribes and to help them live in peace.

== Cast ==
- Kazuhiko Inoue as Hoshio Yumeno / StarzanS
- Yumi Takada as Jun Yagami
- Kuniko Kashii – Maneko
- Tesshō Genda – Eveelz
- Kazue Komiya – Leeds, Mewtan
- Shin Aomori – Hachiro
- Tōru Ōhira – Darth Bellow
- Daisuke Gōri – Iron Man Ultra Z
- Kumiko Takizawa – Matka
- Ryūji Saikachi – Obiwan Senobi
- Sanae Shinohara – Odin Bow
- Takashi Taguchi – Ebiten Senobi
- Keiko Tomochika – Kakasan Senobi
- Nobuo Tanaka – Narrator

== Episodes ==
No.	Title	Directed by	Written by	Animation directed by	Original release date
1	"The Best Okawari Boy in the Universe" "uchuu ichi no okawari BOUI" (宇宙一のおかわりボーイ)	Hidehito Ueda	Takao Koyama	Masayuki Hayashi	January 7, 1984
2	"A God Fell from the Sky!?" "ten kara kami ga futte kita !?" (天から神がふってきた!?)	Directed by : Hiroyuki Tanaka; Storyboarded by : Hiroshi Sasagawa	Takao Koyama	Juuji Mizumura	January 14, 1984
3	"A Lie? The Truth? Paratopia" "USO ? HONTO ? PARATOPIA" (ウソ?ホント?パラトピア)	Directed by : Masakazu Higuchi & Takaaki Ishiyama; Storyboarded by : Masakazu Higuchi	Takao Koyama	Akira Kasahara	January 21, 1984
4	"It's Daikin Planet! Everyone Gather" "DAIKIN boshi da yo ! zenin shuugou" (ダイキン星だよ!全員集合)	Shinya Sadamitsu	Takao Koyama	U-Yeong Jeong	January 28, 1984
5	"It's Cold! A Little Furry" "chappui ! kegawa pocchii" (ちゃっぷい!毛皮ぽっちい)	Koji Sawai	Keiji Terui	Akira Kasahara	February 4, 1984
6	"Two Jun-chans!?" "JUN-chan ga futari !?" (ジュンちゃんがふたり!?)	Directed by : Takao Motohashi; Storyboarded by : Hiroshi Sasagawa	Yoshiyuki Suga	Masayuki Hayashi	February 11, 1984
7	"Drawn to the Sky, Penpen Village" "sora ni hikarete PENPEN mura" (空にひかれてペンペン村)	Directed by : Hiroyuki Tanaka; Storyboarded by : Masakazu Higuchi	Miho Maruo	Juuji Mizumura	February 18, 1984
8	"Heart-pounding! Did you see it Jun-chan?" "DOKI ! mita ne JUN-chan" (ドキ!見たねジュンちゃん)	Yoriyasu Kogawa	Michiru Shimada	U-Yeong Jeong	February 25, 1984
9	"I'll Grow Taller and Reach the Sky" "ten made nobi-ru se ga nobiru" (天までのび～る背がのびる)	Directed by : Takaaki Ishiyama; Storyboarded by : Hiroshi Sasagawa	Toshiki Inoue	Akira Kasahara	March 3, 1984
10	"Infiltration!! Mystery Zone" "sennyuu !! MISUTERIIZOUN" (潜入!!ミステリーゾーン)	Shinya Sadamitsu	Yoshiyuki Suga	Shigeru Katō	March 10, 1984
11	"Twinkling Stars and Pink Snow" "KIRAKIRA hoshi ni PINKU no yuki" (キラキラ星にピンクの雪)	Koji Sawai	Miho Maruo	U-Yeong Jeong	March 17, 1984
12	"Aim for Eveelz's Adopted Star" "mezase EBIRUSU ! youshi no hoshi" (めざせ!エビルス養子の星)	Takaaki Ishiyama	Takao Koyama	Masayuki Hayashi	March 24, 1984
13	"Here come the Space Detectives" "sanjou ! uchuu no hissatsu sagashi ya jin" (参上!宇宙必殺捜し屋人)	Directed by : Hiroyuki Tanaka; Storyboarded by : Yoshikata Nitta	Keiji Terui	Juuji Mizumura	March 31, 1984
14	"Maneko Buddha's Angry Counterattack!" "MANEKO daibutsu ikari no dai gyakushuu !" (マネコ大仏怒りの大逆襲!)	Yoriyasu Kogawa	Yoshiyuki Suga	Chuichi Iguchi	April 7, 1984
15	"Gulp! Laughing on a Deserted Island" "GOKU!! mujintou de MUFUFU" (ゴクッ!無人島でムフフ)	Shinya Sadamitsu	Keiji Terui	Akira Kasahara	April 14, 1984
16	"Maneko-chan's Strange Story" "MANEKO-chan no aijou monogatari" (マネコちゃんのア異常物語)	Directed by : Takao Motohashi; Storyboarded by : Hiroshi Sasagawa	Miho Maruo	U-Yeong Jeong	April 21, 1984
17	"Burning Fighting Spirit! Hachiro's Tears" "moeru toukon ! namida no HACHIROU" (燃える闘魂!涙のハチロー)	Directed by : Masayuki Kojima; Storyboarded by : Hidehito Ueda	Toshiki Inoue	Kinuko Izumi	April 28, 1984
18	"I'm About to Lose! The Handsome Young Man Appears" "make so ! bi seinen sensei deta zo" (負けそ!美青年先生出たぞ)	Directed by : Takaaki Ishiyama; Storyboarded by : Azumi Kubo	Takao Koyama	Shigeru Katō	May 5, 1984
19	"Thank you for your Hard Work at Gokuro Mountain" "GOKUROU-san de gokurousan" (ゴクロウ山でごくろうさん)	Directed by : Hiroyuki Tanaka; Storyboarded by : Azumi Kubo	Michiru Shimada	Masayuki Hayashi	May 12, 1984
20	"Flying Crystal Bikini" "sora tobu KURISUTARU. BIKINI" (空飛ぶクリスタルビキニ)	Koji Sawai	Yoshiyuki Suga	U-Yeong Jeong	May 19, 1984
21	"Undercover Report! 24 Hours of Heroes" "sennyuu RUPO ! HIIROU 24 jikan" (潜入ルポ!ヒーロー24時間)	Masayuki Kojima	Keiji Terui	Kinuko Izumi	May 26, 1984
22	"Hachiro's Love Show-off Lesson!" "HACHIROU no renai mie kouza !" (ハチローの恋愛見栄講座!)	Directed by : Hidehito Ueda; Storyboarded by : Azumi Kubo	Miho Maruo	Akira Kasahara	June 2, 1984
23	"Lele! I Can't be the Second One" "RERE ! ni mai me ni narenai" (レレ!二枚目になれない)	Takaaki Ishiyama	Toshiki Inoue	Nobukazu Sakuma	June 9, 1984
24	"I saw it! The Secret of Okawari House" "mita ! okawari HAUSU no himitsu" (見た!おかわりハウスの秘密)	Directed by : Hiroyuki Tanaka; Storyboarded by : Azumi Kubo	Takao Koyama & Hideyori Ueshima	U-Yeong Jeong	June 16, 1984
25	"The Return of the Robot Clan's Don" "fukkatsu ! ROBOTTO zoku no don" (復活!ロボット族のドン)	Masayuki Kojima	Keiji Terui	Kinuko Izumi	June 23, 1984
26	"Duel! Hopeless Rogues" "kettou ! dounimo narazumono" (決闘!どうにもならず者)	Koji Sawai	Yoshiyuki Suga	Masayuki Hayashi	June 30, 1984
27	"Mewtan Returns Home!" "MYUUTAN kokyou ni kaeru !" (ミュータン故郷に帰る!)	Hidehito Ueda	Michiru Shimada	Shigeru Katō	July 7, 1984
28	"A Traveler Boy's Tokyo Travelogue" "onobori BOUI toukyou kenbun roku" (おのぼりボーイ東京見聞録)	Masayuki Kojima	Takao Koyama	Kinuko Izumi	July 14, 1984
29	"Great Escape! Concrete Jungle" "dai dassou ! KONKURIITO mitsurin" (大脱走!コンクリート密林)	Takaaki Ishiyama	Takao Koyama	Akira Kasahara	July 21, 1984
30	"Corporate War! Leeds VS Maneko" "kigyou dai sensou ! RIIZU VS MANEKO" (企業大戦争リーズVSマネコ)	Directed by : Koji Sawai; Storyboarded by : Hidehito Ueda & Koji Sawai	Takao Koyama & Hideyori Ueshima	Nobukazu Sakuma	July 28, 1984
31	"A Storm is Coming! Babbling Odin Bow" "arashi no yokan ! BABUUOJIN bou" (嵐の予感!バブーオジン坊)	Hiroyuki Tanaka	Yoshiyuki Suga	U-Yeong Jeong	August 4, 1984
32	"A Twinkling Star and Paratopia!?" "KIRAKIRA hoshi ni PARATOPIA !?" (キラキラ星にパラトピア!?)	Masayuki Kojima	Takao Koyama	Kinuko Izumi	August 11, 1984
33	"Highly Mixed-Up, Matka's Starboard" "dai konsen MAZAAKONSENTO" (大混線マザーのコンセント)	Takaaki Ishiyama	Takao Koyama	Shigeru Katō	August 18, 1984
34	"Show Me Your Universe" "kimi no uchuu wo misete" (君の宇宙を見せて)	Hidehito Ueda	Takao Koyama	Masayuki Hayashi	August 25, 1984
