= Time Bokan 2000: Kaitou Kiramekiman =

Japanese television series

- タイムボカン2000 怪盗きらめきマン
- Genre: Adventure, science fiction
- Written by: Takao Koyama
- Directed by: Hidehito Ueda
- Music by: Masaaki Jinbo; Masayuki Yamamoto
- Opening theme: "Kaitou Kiramekiman no uta" by Masayuki Yamamoto & Pink Piggies
- Ending theme: "Furaran randebū" by Hiroto Kōmoto & Pink Piggies
- Country of origin: Japan
- Original language: Japanese
- No. of episodes: 26

Production
- Executive producers: Kenji Yoshida; Ippei Kuri
- Producers: Kazunori Takagi (Yomiko); Kouki Narushima (Tatsunoko); Makiko Iwata (TV Tokyo); Masatoshi Yui
- Production companies: TV Tokyo; Yomiko Advertising; Tatsunoko Production

Original release
- Network: TXN (TV Tokyo)
- Release: April 5 – September 27, 2000

Time Bokan 2000: Kaitou Kiramekiman (タイムボカン2000 怪盗きらめきマン, Taimubokan 2000 Kaitōkiramekiman) is the eighth instalment in the Time Bokan series.

== Plot ==
The series is set in the near future. The world is shaken by a couple of young thieves named Kiramekiman, who issue warnings before they go into action. Once they set their sights on a target, they never fail to steal it. Meanwhile, a detective trio is in pursuit of the Kiramekiman group but are unable to catch them. Secretly, the goal of Kiramekiman is actually noble, since they are only stealing certain objects in order to maintain peace in the future.

== Cast ==
=== Kiramekiman ===
- Lip - Tomoko Kawakami
- Puff - Kōsuke Okano
- Kirameeru - Etsuko Kozakura
- Professor Rikiddo - Minoru Yada

=== Flower Detective Trio ===
- Ruuju - Noriko Ohara
- Hieeru - Jōji Yanami
- Ondoore - Kazuya Tatekabe
- Mr. Dogurin - Junpei Takiguchi
- Dokku Ringo - Masayuki Yamamoto

=== Je t'aime ===
- Eaude Cologne - Shin Aomori
- Mascarra - Misa Watanabe
- Metro - Toshihiko Nakajima
- Cinema - Junichi Endō
- Chateau - Eiji Sekiguchi
- Komantare - Mikako Takahashi

=== Other ===
- Narrator - Junpei Takiguchi

== Episode list ==
| No. | Title | Original release date |
|---|---|---|
| 1 | "The Treasure is the Gold Eye" "Otakara wa Gōrudo Ai" (お宝はゴールドアイ) | April 5, 2000 |
| 2 | "Rich People Beware" "Okanemochi wa Goyōshin" (お金持ちはご用心) | April 12, 2000 |
| 3 | "Are Manga Artists Happy!?" "Mangaka wa o Shiawase" (マンガ家はお幸せ！？) | April 19, 2000 |
| 4 | "The Desert is Easy!?" "Sabaku wa Rakuda!?" (砂漠はラクだ！？) | April 26, 2000 |
| 5 | "What Happened to the Missing Treasure!?" "Kieta Otakara wa!?" (消えたお宝は！？) | May 3, 2000 |
| 6 | "Jungle Struggle" "Janguru Kurō su" (ジャングル苦労す) | May 10, 2000 |
| 7 | "A Show of Sticks" "Shō wa Sutekki" (ショーはステッキ) | May 17, 2000 |
| 8 | "Fierce Battle! TV-style Shopping" "Gekito! TV-teki Kaimono (Terebi Shoppingu)" (激闘！ TV的買物（テレビショッピング）) | May 24, 2000 |
| 9 | "Fortune-Telling Gamble!" "Uranai Ōshōbu!" (うらない大勝負！) | May 31, 2000 |
| 10 | "Kiramekiman Space Wars" "Kirameki Uchū Sensō (Supēsu Uōzu)" (きらめき宇宙戦争（スペースウォーズ）) | June 7, 2000 |
| 11 | "The Phantom Thief is the Challenger!?" "Kaito wa Chōsen-sa (Charenjā!?)" (怪盗は挑戦者（チャレンジャー）！？) | June 14, 2000 |
| 12 | "Aim for the King of Fun" "Mezase o Asobi-Ō" (めざせお遊び王) | June 21, 2000 |
| 13 | "I Love Ghosts!?" "Obake Daisuki!?" (オバケだいすき！？) | June 28, 2000 |
| 14 | "The New Mecha is an Owl?" "Shin Meka wa Fukuro?" (新メカはフクロ？) | July 5, 2000 |
| 15 | "A Big Fuss About Bugs!" "Mushimushi Ōsawagi" (むしむし大騒ぎ！) | July 12, 2000 |
| 16 | "Yay, Time Travel" "Jikan Ryokō (Taimu Toraberu) de Iē" (時間旅行（タイムトラベル）でイェー) | July 19, 2000 |
| 17 | "The Third Hero" "Daisan no Otoko (Hīrō)?" (第三の男（ヒーロー）？) | July 26, 2000 |
| 18 | "The Refrigerator's Red Hot" "Reizōko Acchi-cchi" (冷蔵庫アッチッチ) | August 2, 2000 |
| 19 | "The Film is Inspiring!" "Eiga wa Hirameki!" (映画はひらめき！) | August 9, 2000 |
| 20 | "A Super Robot's Special Training!" "Supa Robo Tokkun-chu!" (スパロボ特訓中！) | August 16, 2000 |
| 21 | "The Three Detectives Become Evil" "San Keiji (Deka) Aku to Naru" (三刑事（デカ）悪となる) | August 23, 2000 |
| 22 | "Search for the Treaure on Treasure Island" "Takarajima de Otakara o Sagase" (宝島でお宝を探せ) | August 30, 2000 |
| 23 | "Showdown with the Great Detective" "Mei Tantei to no Taiketsu" (名探偵との対決) | September 6, 2000 |
| 24 | "A Corroded Cavity" "Mushiba Mareta Mushiba" (ムシバまれた虫歯) | September 13, 2000 |
| 25 | "The Great Detective Trio" "O Tegara Keiji (Deka) Torio" (お手柄刑事（デカ）トリオ) | September 20, 2000 |
| 26 | "The Gold Eye is Found" "Gōrudo Ai Mikke" (ゴールドアイみっけ) | September 27, 2000 |
