= Lalabel, the Magical Girl =

Japanese anime television series

- Lalabel
- Cover of the first DVD box

魔法少女ララベル (Mahō Shōjo Raraberu)
- Genre: Magical girl
- Created by: Eiko Fujiwara
- Anime television series
- Directed by: Hiroshi Shidara (chief director)
- Music by: Taku Izumi
- Studio: Toei Animation
- Original network: ANN (TV Asahi)
- Original run: February 15, 1980 – February 27, 1981
- Episodes: 49
- Anime television film

Magical Girl Lalabel: The Sea Calls for a Summer Vacation
- Directed by: Hiroshi Shidara
- Studio: Toei Animation
- Released: July 12, 1980
- Runtime: 15 minutes

Lalabel, The Magical Girl (魔法少女ララベル, Mahō Shōjo Raraberu) is a magical girl anime television series by Toei Animation. It aired from 15 February 1980 to 27 February 1981 on TV Asahi.

A 15-minute film called Magical Girl Lalabel: The Sea Calls for a Summer Vacation (魔法少女ララベル 海が呼ぶ夏休み, Mahō Shōjo Raraberu: Umi ga Yobu Natsuyatsumi) was released in Japan on July 12, 1980.

== Plot ==
Lalabel, a magical girl from a magical world, accidentally falls into the human world after encountering a thief named Biscus who steals magical tools. She is found by an elderly couple who take her in, allowing her to live amongst humans while secretly battling Biscus to retrieve the stolen magic items, all while writing proverbs in her diary to reflect on her experiences and growing understanding of human life. Eventually, through her actions, Biscus reforms and both Lalabel and Biscus lose their magical powers, becoming fully human.

== Characters ==
- Lalabel Tachibana (立花ララベル, Tachibana Raraberu)

Voiced by: Mitsuko Horie

Lalabel is the main character and a magical girl from the magic world. One night, while she is sleeping, her magical items wake her up, and she sees Biscus stealing two magical briefcases. After being pulled to Earth by Biscus, she is adopted by the Tachibanas and decides to stay until she returns home.

- Biscus Hayashi (ビスカス高林, Bisukasu Hayashi)

Voiced by: Banjō Ginga

Biscus is a fat thief and the main antagonist. He stole two magical briefcases from the magical realm where Lalabel lived in, but after being surprised by Lalabel, he transports the two of them to Earth, losing one of the briefcases in the process. While on Earth, he shacks up with a ramen stand owner, Ochiba, who is as greedy and nasty as himself. He tries to swindle people with his (stolen) magic powers while trying to steal Lalabel's briefcase. He has a grey cat, who is nasty and horrid as himself.

- The Tachibanas: Sakuzo Tachibana (立花作造, Tachibana Sakuzō) and Ume Tachibana (立花ウメ, Tachibana Ume)

Voiced by: Jōji Yanami, Keiko Miyazaki

Sakuzo and Ume are a kind elderly couple who let Lalabel stay with them. Ume is the typical kindly grandmother figure and she made Lalabel's signature pink dress. Sakuzo is cynical and does not like magic, but after Lalabel saves him from drowning, he starts to warm up to her and her magic. He is the one who comes up with the proverbs that Lalabel writes.

- Teruko 'Teko' Takemura (竹村テルコ/テコ, Takemura Teruko/Teko)

Voiced by: Noriko Tsukase

Teruko is the granddaughter of the Tachibanas. She is a friend of Lalabel, who lives with her grandparents due to her parents working overseas.

- Toshiko 'Toko' Matsumiya (松宮トシコ/トコ, Matsumiya Toshiko/Toko)

Voiced by: Minori Matsushima

Toshiko is one of Lalabel and Teko's friends.

- Tsumoro Ochiba (落葉積郎, Ochiba Tsumorō)

Voiced by: Shigeru Tsuji

Biscus' sidekick.

- Tsubomi Yuri (由利つぼみ, Yuri Tsubomi)

Voiced by: Yumi Nakatani

Tsubomi is the rich girl in Lalabel, Teko, and Toko's class. She has a snobbish attitude towards Teko and Toko and uses her privilege to get her way. Lalabel saved her from being hit by her father's construction vehicles that were ignoring a sidewalk Lalabel and her friends use to get to school.

== Theme songs ==
The opening theme Hello Lalabel and the ending theme Mahou Shōjo Lalabel are sung by Mitsuko Horie.
