= Zenderman =

Japanese anime television series

- タイムボカンシリーズ ゼンダマン
- Created by: Tatsunoko Production Planning Office
- Directed by: Hiroshi Sasagawa
- Music by: Masaaki Jinbo; Masayuki Yamamoto
- Opening theme: "Zenderman no uta" by Ken Fujii
- Ending theme: "Wasure kkonashi yo" by Masayuki Yamamoto
- Country of origin: Japan
- Original language: Japanese
- No. of episodes: 52

Production
- Executive producer: Kenji Yoshida
- Producers: Kiyoshi Yokoo; Masatsugu Nakai
- Production companies: Fuji Television; Tatsunoko Production

Original release
- Network: FNS (Fuji TV)
- Release: February 3, 1979 – January 26, 1980

Zenderman (ゼンダマン, Zendaman) is a Japanese anime television series which first aired from February 3, 1979, to January 26, 1980, on every Saturday from 6:30 pm to 7:00 pm with a total of 52 episodes. It is the third show in the sequence of "Time Bokan Series" produced by Tatsunoko Productions. It was preceded by Yatterman and succeeded by Rescueman.

== Plot ==
Dr. Monja is a scientist, who is curious about the nature of the legendary "Elixir of Life" which grants the user eternal lifetimes and forever youth. He built a device called the "Time Tunnel" in order to let a team of youngsters start a quest down the timeline and various spaces to find an exact answer. The Akudama Trio, however, is also seemingly after exactly the same thing.

== Cast ==
=== Heroes ===
- Tetsu (鉄ちゃん): (voiced by Yūji Mitsuya) The lab assistant of Dr. Monja aged 13. Like his counterpart Tanpei in the show Time Bokan, he is sporty and quite capable at mechanics.
- Sakura (さくらちゃん): (voiced by Kumiko Takizawa)
- Amattan (アマッタン): (voiced by Yōko Asagami and Ai Sakuma)
- Dr. Monja (紋者博士,, Monja-hakase): (voiced by Kouhei Miyauchi)

=== Villains ===
- Muujo (ムージョ): (voiced by Noriko Ohara)
- Tobocke (トボッケー): (voiced by Jouji Yanami)
- Donjuro (ドンジューロー): (voiced by Kazuya Tatekabe)
- Nyaravota (ニャラボルタ): (voiced by Masaru Ikeda)
- Referee Machine (サイバンマシーン): (voiced by Yoshito Miyamura)

=== Other characters ===
- Narrator: Kei Tomiyama

== Episodes ==
No.	Title	Original release date
1	"Being Invincible is Great! Zenderman" "Muteki ha suteki! Zendaman" (無敵はステキ！ゼンダマン)	February 3, 1979
2	"It's the Dragon Palace! Zenderman" "Ryūgūjo dayo! Zendaman" (竜宮城だよ！ゼンダマン)	February 10, 1979
3	"It's the Garden of Eden! Zenderman" "Eden no sono dayo! Zendaman" (エデンの園だよ！ゼンダマン)	February 17, 1979
4	"It's Yamatai-koku! Zenderman" "Yamataikoku dayo! Zendaman" (ヤマタイ国だよ！ゼンダマン)	February 24, 1979
5	"Tsukiyoshimaru's Great Advancement! Zenderman" "Tsukiyoshimaru no dai shusse! Zendaman" (月吉丸の大出世！ゼンダマン)	March 3, 1979
6	"The Eight-Character Army's Great Attack! Zenderman" "Dai shingeki da hachi ji gun! Zendaman" (大進撃だ八字軍！ゼンダマン)	March 10, 1979
7	"The Running White Horse! Zenderman" "Hashire hakuba! Zendaman" (走れ白馬！ゼンダマン)	March 17, 1979
8	"It's Don Manjiro! Zenderman" "Don. manjirō dayo! Zendaman" (ドン・万次郎だよ！ゼンダマン)	March 24, 1979
9	"The Foolish Sage! Zenderman" "Boke no sennin dayo! Zendaman" (ボケの仙人だよ！ゼンダマン)	March 31, 1979
10	"Its Prince Chōtoku! Zenderman" "Chōtokutaishi dayo! Zendaman" (超徳太子だよ！ゼンダマン)	April 7, 1979
11	"3000 Leagues in Search of Father! Zenderman" "Chichi wo tazunete sanzenri! Zendaman" (父をたずねて三千里！ゼンダマン)	April 14, 1979
12	"It's Puss in Boots! Zenderman" "Nagagutsu wo haita neko! Zendaman" (長ぐつをはいた猫！ゼンダマン)	April 21, 1979
13	"It's a Viking! Zenderman" "Baikingu dayo! Zendaman" (バイキングだよ！ゼンダマン)	April 28, 1979
14	"The Mystery of the Aztecs! Zenderman" "Nazo no asuteka! Zendaman" (謎のアステカ！ゼンダマン)	May 5, 1979
15	"It's Jingisukan! Zenderman" "Jingisukan dayo! Zendaman" (ジンギスカンだよ！ゼンダマン)	May 12, 1979
16	"It's Kobutori Jiisan! Zenderman" "Kobutori jiisan dayo! Zendaman" (こぶとりじいさんだよ！ゼンダマン)	May 19, 1979
17	"The Future of Space! Zenderman" "Mirai no uchū he! Zendaman" (未来の宇宙へ！ゼンダマン)	May 26, 1979
18	"The Glacier's Mammoth! Zenderman" "Hyōga no manmosu! Zendaman" (氷河のマンモス！ゼンダマン)	June 2, 1979
19	"It's the Apache Treasure! Zenderman" "Apacchi no takara dayo! Zendaman" (アパッチの宝だよ！ゼンダマン)	June 9, 1979
20	"It's Versailles! Zenderman" "Barasaiyu dayo! Zendaman" (バラサイユだよ！ゼンダマン)	June 16, 1979
21	"The Jam of Nagamasa! Zenderman" "Jamu no nagamasa! Zendaman" (ジャムの長政！ゼンダマン)	June 23, 1979
22	"The End of Pompeii! Zenderman" "Ponpei no saigo dayo! Zendaman" (ポンペイの最期だよ！ゼンダマン)	June 30, 1979
23	"It's Princess Kaguya! Zenderman" "Kaguya hime dayo! Zendaman" (かぐや姫だよ！ゼンダマン)	July 7, 1979
24	"It's the Demonic Golem! Zenderman" "Goremu majin dayo! Zendaman" (ゴーレム魔人だよ！ゼンダマン)	July 14, 1979
25	"The Murder Case in the Amazon! Zenderman" "Amazon satsujinjiken dayo! Zendaman" (アマゾン殺人事件だよ！ゼンダマン)	July 21, 1979
26	"It's Mito Kōmon! Zenderman" "Mito kōmon dayo! Zendaman" (水戸肛門だよ！ゼンダマン)	July 28, 1979
27	"Alice in Wonderland! Zenderman" "Fushigi na kuni no arisu! Zendaman" (不思議な国のアリス！ゼンダマン)	August 4, 1979
28	"It's the Demon Gozu! Zenderman" "Gozu majin dayo! Zendaman" (牛頭魔人だよ！ゼンダマン)	August 11, 1979
29	"It's Ryoma Sakamoto! Zenderman" "Sakamoto ryoma dayo! Zendaman" (坂本リョーマだよ！ゼンダマン)	August 18, 1979
30	"It's the Legendary Zorro! Zenderman" "Kaiketsu soro dayo! Zendaman" (怪傑ソロだよ！ゼンダマン)	August 25, 1979
31	"It's Cook's Great Voyage! Zenderman" "Kukkun no daikōkai! Zendaman" (クックンの大航海！ゼンダマン)	September 1, 1979
32	"It's Benkei-san! Zenderman" "Benkei san dayo! Zendaman" (弁慶サンだよ！ゼンダマン)	September 8, 1979
33	"It's Inō Tadataka! Zenderman" "Inō tadataka dayo! Zendaman" (有能忠敬だよ！ゼンダマン)	September 15, 1979
34	"It's Yoro Falls! Zenderman" "Yoro no taki dayo! Zendaman" (ヨーローの滝だよ！ゼンダマン)	September 22, 1979
35	"The Tiger Hunt! Zenderman" "Tora taiji dayo! Zendaman" (トラ退治だよ！ゼンダマン)	September 29, 1979
36	"Chan, Come Back! Zenderman" "Cha~n kamubakku! Zendaman" (チャ～ンカムバック！ゼンダマン)	October 6, 1979
37	"It's the Golden Goose! Zenderman" "Kin no gachō dayo! Zendaman" (金のガチョウだよ！ゼンダマン)	October 13, 1979
38	"Bergerac's Nose! Zenderman" "Hana no berujurakku dayo! Zendaman" (鼻のベルジュラックだよ！ゼンダマン)	October 20, 1979
39	"Its Momotaro-san! Zenderman" "Momotarō san dayo! Zendaman" (桃太郎さんだよ！ゼンダマン)	October 27, 1979
40	"Fly, Pegasus! Zenderman" "Tobeyo pegasasu! Zendaman" (とべよペガサス！ゼンダマン)	November 3, 1979
41	"It's Hanasaka Jiisan! Zenderman" "Hanasaka jiisandayo! Zendaman" (花咲かじいさんだよ！ゼンダマン)	November 10, 1979
42	"The Genius da Vinci! Zenderman" "Tensai da・binchi! Zendaman" (天才ダ・ビンチ！ゼンダマン)	November 17, 1979
43	"It's the ancient Olympics! Zenderman" "Kodai orinpikku dayo! Zendaman" (古代オリンピックだよ！ゼンダマン)	November 24, 1979
44	"The Brave Cossacks! Zenderman" "Kosakku yūshi dayo! Zendaman" (コサック勇士だよ！ゼンダマン)	December 1, 1979
45	"It's the Wolfman! Zenderman" "Ookami otoko dayo! Zendaman" (オオカミ男だよ！ゼンダマン)	December 8, 1979
46	"The Land of the Giants! Zenderman" "Kyojin no kuni dayo! Zendaman" (巨人の国だよ！ゼンダマン)	December 16, 1979
47	"It's a Time Monster! Zenderman" "Taimumonsuta dayo! Zendaman" (タイムモンスターだよ！ゼンダマン)	December 22, 1979
48	"It's Perperman! Zenderman" "Papaman dayo! Zendaman" (パーパーマンだよ！ゼンダマン)	December 29, 1979
49	"Musashi's Homerun! Zenderman" "Musashi homuran! Zendaman" (武蔵ホームラン！ゼンダマン)	January 5, 1980
50	"The Heavenly Woman's Robe! Zenderman" "Tennyo no koromo dayo! Zendaman" (天女の衣だよ！ゼンダマン)	January 12, 1980
51	"The Elixir of Life is Found! ZendermaN!" "Inochi no moto hakken! Zendaman" (命のもと発見！ゼンダマン)	January 18, 1980
52	"Ah, The Elixir of Life! Zenderman!" "Aa inochi no moto! Zendaman" (ああ命のもと!ゼンダマン)	January 26, 1980
