= Dokkan =

Dokkan or Dokkān may refer to:

- Dragon Ball Z: Dokkan Battle, 2015 mobile game based on the Dragon Ball franchise
- Ojamajo Doremi Dokkān!, the fourth and final season of Ojamajo Doremi (2002–2003)
- Dokkan! Robotendon, anime series (1995–1996)
- Shehata's Shop, 2009 Egyptian film also known as Dokkan Shehata
