= List of Time Bokan episodes =

This is a list of episodes for the Japanese anime series Time Bokan. The anime was first aired in Japan on Fuji TV from October 4, 1975, to December 25, 1976. There are sixty-one episodes in the show.

== Episodes ==
No.	Title	Directed by	Written by	Original release date
1	"Let's Go! Time Bokan, Squawk"; Transliteration: "Hasshin! Taimu Bokan da peccha" (Japanese: 発進！ タイムボカンだペッチャ)	Hiroshi Sasagawa	Jinzo Toriumi	October 4, 1975
2	"Greece's Foolish War, Squawk"; Transliteration: "Girisha no zukkoke sensōda peccha" (Japanese: ギリシャのズッコケ戦争だペッチャ)	Yuji Nunokawa	Saburo Taki	October 11, 1975
3	"It's a Terrifying Witch Hunt, Squawk"; Transliteration: "Kyōfu no majokari da peccha" (Japanese: 恐怖の魔女狩りだペッチャ)	Yoshio Okamoto; Kōichi Sasaki	Yoshiaki Yoshida	October 18, 1975
4	"It's a Strange Journey to the West, Squawk"; Transliteration: "Henteko Saiyūki da peccha" (Japanese: へんてこ西遊記だペッチャ)	Tōru Jinzenji	Saburo Taki	October 25, 1975
5	"Primitive Man is Kind, Squawk"; Transliteration: "Genshi hito wa yasashī peccha" (Japanese: 原始人はやさしいペッチャ)	Hiroshi Sasagawa	Yū Yamamoto	November 1, 1975
6	"Pirates Love Parrots, Squawk"; Transliteration: "Kaizoku wa ōmu ga suki da peccha" (Japanese: 海賊はオウムが好きだペッチャ)	Yoshio Okamoto; Yuji Nunokawa	Takao Koyama	November 8, 1975
7	"The Signal is Open Sesame, Squawk"; Transliteration: "Aizu wa hirake goma da peccha" (Japanese: 合図はひらけゴマだペッチャ)	Tōru Jinzenji	Yū Yamamoto	November 15, 1975
8	"Introducing! Gengis Khan, Squawk"; Transliteration: "Dai tōjō! Jingisukan da peccha" (Japanese: 大登場！ ジンギスカンだペッチャ)	Katsuhisa Yamada	Shimon Hotta	November 22, 1975
9	"Great Battle of the West, Squawk"; Transliteration: "Seibu no dai kettō da peccha" (Japanese: 西部の大決闘だペッチャ)	Yūji Nunokawa	Yū Yamamoto	November 29, 1975
10	"Cool Ninja, Squawk"; Transliteration: "Kakkoī ninja da peccha" (Japanese: かっこいい忍者だペッチャ)	Tōru Jinzenji	Yoshiaki Yoshida	December 6, 1975
11	"The Inca's Treasure Found, Squawk"; Transliteration: "Inka no takara mitsuketa peccha" (Japanese: インカの宝みつけたペッチャ)	Yūji Nunokawa	Yū Yamamoto	December 13, 1975
12	"The Mona Lisa's Secret, Squawk"; Transliteration: "Monariza no himitsu da peccha" (Japanese: モナリザの秘密だペッチャ)	Masami Annō; Yūji Nunokawa	Masaaki Sakurai	December 20, 1975
13	"Great Sinking! Atlantis, Squawk"; Transliteration: "Dai chinbotsu! Atorantisu da peccha" (Japanese: 大沈没！ アトランティスだペッチャ)	Tōru Jinzenji	Tsunehisa Itō	December 27, 1975
14	"Dracula Appeared, Squawk"; Transliteration: "Dorakyura ga deta peccha" (Japanese: ドラキュラが出たペッチャ)	Yūji Nunokawa	Yū Yamamoto	January 3, 1976
15	"Swing the Magic Mallet, Squawk"; Transliteration: "Uchide no kodzuchi o furu peccha" (Japanese: 打ち出の小づちを振るペッチャ)	Hideo Nishimaki	Saburo Taki	January 10, 1976
16	"The Clumsy Wright Brothers, Squawk"; Transliteration: "Zukkoke! Raito kyōdai da peccha" (Japanese: ズッコケ！ ライト兄弟だペッチャ)	Tōru Jinzenji	Haruya Yamazaki	January 17, 1976
17	"Dororon! It's Goemon, Squawk"; Transliteration: "Dororon! Goemon da peccha" (Japanese: ドロロン! 五右衛門だペッチャ)	Masami Annō; Tōru Jinzenji	Keiji Kubota	January 24, 1976
18	"Hurry! Snow White is in Danger, Squawk"; Transliteration: "Isoge! Shirayukihime ga abunai peccha" (Japanese: 急げ！ 白雪姫があぶないペッチャ)	Tōru Jinzenji	Yū Yamamoto	January 31, 1976
19	"A Robot's Country 1000 Years from Now, Squawk"; Transliteration: "1000-nen-go no robotto kuni da peccha" (Japanese: 1000年後のロボット国だペッチャ)	Yūji Nunokawa	Yū Yamamoto	February 7, 1976
20	"Ivan Doesn't Lie, Squawk"; Transliteration: "Iwan wa uso o iwanai peccha" (Japanese: イワンはウソをいわないペッチャ)	Masami Annō; Yūji Nunokawa	Hiroshi Yamano	February 14, 1976
21	"Get Out of the Way! It's Don Quixote, Squawk"; Transliteration: "Sokonoke! Don Kihōte da peccha" (Japanese: そこのけ！ ドン・キホーテだペッチャ)	Masami Annō; Yūji Nunokawa	Shigeru Yanagawa	February 21, 1976
22	"Pinocchio's Great Adventure, Squawk"; Transliteration: "Pinokio no daibōken da peccha" (Japanese: ピノキオの大冒険だペッチャ)	Tōru Jinzenji	Yū Yamamoto	February 28, 1976
23	"Lord Kōmon is Wonderful, Squawk"; Transliteration: "Kōmon-sama wa suteki da peccha" (Japanese: 黄門さまはステキだペッチャ)	Masami Annō; Hiroshi Sasagawa	Yoshiaki Yoshida	March 6, 1976
24	"The Great Duel Between Ushawakamaru and Benkei, Squawk"; Transliteration: "Ushiwakamaru to Benkei no dai kettō da peccha" (Japanese: 牛若丸と弁慶の大決闘だペッチャ)	Kōichi Sasaki	Saburo Taki	March 13, 1976
25	"Here it is! Robin Hood, Squawk"; Transliteration: "Deta zo! Robin fuddo da peccha" (Japanese: 出たぞ！ ロビン・フッドだペッチャ)	Yūji Nunokawa	Yutaka Kaneko	March 20, 1976
26	"Go for it, Go to Treasure Island, Squawk"; Transliteration: "Soreike yare ike takarajima da peccha" (Japanese: それ行けやれ行け宝島だペッチャ)	Tōru Jinzenji	Yū Yamamoto	March 27, 1976
27	"Discovering Dr. Kieta, Squawk"; Transliteration: "Kieta-hakase o hakken da peccha" (Japanese: 木江田博士を発見だペッチャ)	Masami Annō; Yūji Nunokawa	Saburo Taki	April 3, 1976
28	Transliteration: "Jakku to mame no ki ōsōdō da peccha" (Japanese: ジャックと豆の木大騒動だペッチャ)	Katsuhisa Yamada	Yū Yamamoto	April 10, 1976
29	"Making Flowers Bloom on Dead Trees, Squawk"; Transliteration: "Kareki ni hana o sakaseru peccha" (Japanese: 枯れ木に花を咲かせるペッチャ)	Yūji Nunokawa	Sōji Yoshikawa	April 17, 1976
30	"Little Red Riding Hood, Be Careful, Squawk"; Transliteration: "Aka zukin-chan ki o tsukete da peccha" (Japanese: 赤頭巾ちゃん気をつけてだペッチャ)	Tōru Jinzenji	Yū Yamamoto	April 24, 1976
31	"Dreaming Princess Cinderella, Squawk"; Transliteration: "Yumemiru Shinderera-hime da peccha" (Japanese: 夢見るシンデレラ姫だペッチャ)	Kōichi Sasaki	Tsunehisa Itō	May 1, 1976
32	"Let's Protect to Future of Elephants, Squawk"; Transliteration: "Mirai no zō-san o mamorou peccha" (Japanese: 未来の象さんを守ろうペッチャ)	Masami Anno; Hiroshi Sasagawa	Sōji Yoshikawa	May 15, 1976
33	"Surprise! The Angel is an Alien, Squawk"; Transliteration: "Bikkuri! Ten'nyo wa uchūbito da peccha" (Japanese: ビックリ！ 天女は宇宙人だペッチャ)	Kōichi Mashimo; Hidehito Ueda	Tsunehisa Itō	May 22, 1976
34	"Charge! Yamata no Orochi, Squawk"; Transliteration: "Totsugeki! Yamata no orochi da peccha" (Japanese: 突撃! ヤマタのオロチだペッチャ)	Katsuhisa Yamada	Yū Yamamoto	May 29, 1976
35	"Hang in There, Frankenstein, Squawk"; Transliteration: "Furanken! Gaman da peccha" (Japanese: フランケン! がまんだペッチャ)	Yūji Nunokawa	Sōji Yoshikawa	June 5, 1976
36	"The Future is a Baboon Country, Squawk"; Transliteration: "Mirai wa hihi no kuni da peccha" (Japanese: 未来はヒヒの国だペッチャ)	Kōichi Mashimo	Yū Yamamoto	June 12, 1976
37	"The Emperor's New Clothes, Squawk"; Transliteration: "Ōsama wa hadaka da peccha" (Japanese: 王様は裸だペッチャ)	Kōichi Sasaki	Yū Yamamoto	June 19, 1976
38	"Momotaro's Demon Slaying, Squawk"; Transliteration: "Momotarō no oni taiji da peccha" (Japanese: 桃太郎の鬼退治だペッチャ)	Yūji Nunokawa	Tsunehisa Itō	June 26, 1976
39	"The Pied Piper of Hamelin, Squawk"; Transliteration: "Hamerun no fuefuki da Petcha" (Japanese: ハメルンの笛吹きだペッチャ)	Kōichi Mashimo; Hidehito Ueda	Sōji Yoshikawa	July 3, 1976
40	"The Crane's Return of Gratitude, Squawk"; Transliteration: "Tsuru no ongaeshi da peccha" (Japanese: 鶴の恩返しだペッチャ)	Hidehito Ueda	Tsunehisa Itō	July 10, 1976
41	"Ryūgū is the Best, Squawk"; Transliteration: "Ryūgū wa saikō da peccha" (Japanese: 竜宮は最高だペッチャ)	Mizuho Nishikubo	Saburo Taki	July 17, 1976
42	"The Secret of Apache Valley, Squawk"; Transliteration: "Apatchi tani no himitsu da peccha" (Japanese: アパッチ谷の秘密だペッチャ)	Kōichi Sasaki	Yū Yamamoto	July 24, 1976
43	"Princess Kaguya is Beautiful, Squawk"; Transliteration: "Kaguya hime wa bijin da peccha" (Japanese: かぐや姫は美人だペッチャ)	Yūji Nunokawa	Saburo Taki	August 21, 1976
44	"Monkey Crab Battle, Squawk"; Transliteration: "Saru kani kassen da peccha" (Japanese: サルカニ合戦だペッチャ)	Yūji Nunokawa	Kazuo Satō	August 28, 1976
45	"The Mystery of Dr. Jekyll, Squawk"; Transliteration: "Jikiru hakase no nazo da peccha" (Japanese: ジキル博士のナゾだペッチャ)	Kōichi Mashimo; Nobuo Onuki	Kazumoto Hira	September 4, 1976
46	"The Little Match Girl, Squawk"; Transliteration: "Matchi uri no shōjo da peccha" (Japanese: マッチ売りの少女だペッチャ)	Hidehito Ueda	Yū Yamamoto	September 11, 1976
47	"Aladdin and the Magic Lamp, Squawk"; Transliteration: "Arajin to Mahō no Ranpu da peccha" (Japanese: アラジンと魔法のランプだペッチャ)	Kōichi Mashimo	Yū Yamamoto	September 18, 1976
48	"Kintaro from Mount Ashigara, Squawk"; Transliteration: "Ashigara Yama no Kintarō da peccha" (Japanese: 足柄山の金太郎だペッチャ)	Nobuo Onuki; Yūji Nunokawa	Sōji Yoshikawa	September 25, 1976
49	"Umisachi & Yamasachi Have Made Up, Squawk"; Transliteration: "Umi sachi yama sachi nakanaori da peccha" (Japanese: 海さち山さち仲直りだペッチャ)	Yūji Nunokawa	Yū Yamamoto	October 2, 1976
50	"The Red Shoes is Sad, Squawk"; Transliteration: "Akai kutsu wa kanashii peccha" (Japanese: 赤い靴は悲しいペッチャ)	Yūji Nunokawa	Yū Yamamoto	October 9, 1976
51	"The World of the Moon is Wonderful, Squawk"; Transliteration: "Tsuki no sekai wa suteki da peccha" (Japanese: 月の世界はステキだペッチャ)	Kōichi Mashimo; Hidehito Ueda	Kazuo Satō	October 16, 1976
52	"Rescue the Little Mermaid, Squawk"; Transliteration: "Ningyo hime o tasukeru peccha" (Japanese: 人魚姫を助けるペッチャ)	Hidehito Ueda	Tsunehisa Itō	October 23, 1976
53	"It's Hard Being the Invisible Man, Squawk"; Transliteration: "Tōmei ningen wa tsurai yo peccha" (Japanese: 透明人間はつらいよペッチャ)	Yūji Nunokawa	Sōji Yoshikawa	October 30, 1976
54	"Mystery of the Underground Kingdom, Squawk"; Transliteration: "Chitei ōkoku no nazo da peccha" (Japanese: 地底王国のナゾだペッチャ)	Hidehito Ueda	Yū Yamamoto	November 6, 1976
55	"Build a Pyramid, Squawk"; Transliteration: "Piramiddo o tsukuru petcha" (Japanese: ピラミッドをつくるペッチャ)	Nobuo Onuki	Tsunehisa Itō	November 13, 1976
56	"The Easter Island Giants' Turmoil, Squawk"; Transliteration: "Īsutā-tō no Kyojin sōdō da peccha" (Japanese: イースター島の巨人騒動だペッチャ)	Yūji Nunokawa	Yū Yamamoto	November 20, 1976
57	"Treasure of the Vineyards, Squawk"; Transliteration: "Budō hatake no takara da peccha" (Japanese: ぶどう畑の宝だペッチャ)	Tōru Jinzenji	Kazuo Satō	November 27, 1976
58	"Where is the Sparrow's Lodge, Squawk"; Transliteration: "Suzume no oyado wa doko da peccha" (Japanese: 雀のお宿はどこだペッチャ)	Hidehito Ueda	Kiichi Ishii	December 4, 1976
59	"We became Gulliver, Squawk"; Transliteration: "Boku-tachi Garibā ni natta peccha" (Japanese: ぼくたちガリバーになったペッチャ)	Kōichi Mashimo	Saburo Taki	December 11, 1976
60	"Sinbad's Romance, Squawk"; Transliteration: "Shindobatto no roman da peccha" (Japanese: シンドバットのロマンだペッチャ)	Tōru Jinzenji	Kazumoto Hira	December 18, 1976
61	"I Found the Dynamond, Squawk"; Transliteration: "Dainamondo o hakken da peccha" (Japanese: ダイナモンドを発見だペッチャ)	Yūji Nunokawa	Saburo Taki	December 25, 1976
