= Gyakuten! Ippatsuman =

Japanese anime television series

- タイムボカンシリーズ 逆転!イッパツマン
- Genre: Adventure, science fiction, mecha
- Created by: Tatsunoko Production Planning Office
- Directed by: Hiroshi Sasagawa
- Music by: Masaaki Jinbo; Masayuki Yamamoto
- Opening theme: Gyakuten! Ippatsuman by Masayuki Yamamoto and Pink Piggies
- Ending theme: Shibibīn Rapusodi by Masayuki Yamamoto and Pink Piggies
- Country of origin: Japan
- Original language: Japanese
- No. of episodes: 58

Production
- Executive producer: Kenji Yoshida
- Producers: Akira Inoue (Tatsunoko); Hiroshi Iwata (Anime Friend); Minoru Uchima (Yomiko)
- Editor: Yukio Tanigawa
- Production companies: Fuji Television; Tatsunoko Production

Original release
- Network: FNS (Fuji TV)
- Release: February 13, 1982 – March 26, 1983

Gyakuten! Ippatsuman (逆転!イッパツマン) is a Japanese anime television series broadcast from February 13, 1982, to March 26, 1983, comprising 58 episodes. It is the sixth entry to the Time Bokan series by Tatsunoko Productions and the second series to feature a super robot as the main hero. The series succeeded Yattodetaman and preceded Itadakiman in 1983. The title character is playable in the fighting game Tatsunoko vs. Capcom.

== Story ==
In the 1990s-era Osteandel City is the headquarters of Time Lease, a business that leases almost everything you could ask for, including powerful robots. They are proud of themselves for being number one in the international ranking of billionaires for the past ten consecutive years. Meanwhile, there is another lease company in the same city called Skull Lease, where the notorious villain trio work as top executives. Their ostensible object is to disgrace the credit of Time Lease and replace them as the leading enterprise, but they have a scheme to secure a footing for world conquest. One day, a transport robot of Time Lease is assaulted by the villain trio and Ippatsuman prepares to get on the move to fight for justice.

== Cast ==
=== Time Lease ===
- Sokkyu Gou/Ippatsuman - Kei Tomiyama (Yasunori Matsumoto (Bokan GoGoGo), Masayuki Katō (Tatsunoko vs. Capcom))
- Ran Houmu - Eriko Hara
- Harubou - Noriko Tsukase
- 2-3 - Masayuki Yamamoto
- Haruka Hoshi - Naoko Kōda
- Koizou Higeno - Daisuke Gōri (as Yoshio Nagahori)

=== Skull Lease ===
==== Osteandel Northern Branch ====
- Mun-Mun - Noriko Ohara
- Kosuinen - Jōji Yanami
- Kyokanchin - Kazuya Tatekabe
- Chinami - Issei Futamata
- Piiko - Mari Yokō
- Seiko - Kazuyo Aoki
- OL-san - Masako Katsuki
- Jukunen-san - Shigeru Chiba→Masashi Hirose
- Yangu - Shigeru Chiba
- Madogiwa-san - Masashi Hirose→Naoki Tatsuta
- Otoshima-san - Masako Katsuki→Reiko Suzuki
- Anna Touhoku - Kazue Komiya

==== Osteandel Western Branch ====
- Tamashirou Kakure - Shinya Ōtaki (as Susumu Ōtaki)
- Spy000 - Hirotaka Suzuoki

==== Head Office ====
- Con Cordo - Kaneta Kimotsuki
- Min-Min - Mika Doi

=== Machine Friend ===
- Ichiro Imai - Shigeru Chiba

=== Other ===
- Narration - Hirotaka Suzuoki

== Episodes ==
No.	Title	Original release date
1	"One-Shot Pinch: Great Reversal"; Transliteration: "Pinchi Ippatsu Dai Gyakuten" (Japanese: ピンチ一発 大逆転)	February 13, 1982
2	"The Rival's An Amazing Guy"; Transliteration: "Raibaru Wa Sugoi Yatsu" (Japanese: ライバルはすごいヤツ)	February 20, 1982
3	"The Evil Trio That Stopped The Humans"; Transliteration: "Ningen Yameta Aku Torio" (Japanese: 人間やめた悪トリオ)	February 27, 1982
4	"Love At First Sight, Mister X"; Transliteration: "Hitomebore Misutā X" (Japanese: ひとめぼれミスターX)	March 6, 1982
5	"The Homebaser's Secret"; Transliteration: "Hōmubēsā No Himitsu" (Japanese: ホームベーサーの秘密)	March 13, 1982
6	"All Open! Head Chief's First Day"; Transliteration: "Zen Kōkai! Buchō No Tsuitachi" (Japanese: 全公開! 部長の一日)	March 20, 1982
7	"One-Shot Express Medical Squad"; Transliteration: "Ippatsu Kyūkō Iryō-tai" (Japanese: イッパツ急行医療隊)	March 27, 1982
8	"Australia's Pinch Communication With No Response"; Transliteration: "Ōsutoraria Pinchi Tsūshin Ōtōsezu" (Japanese: 豪アピンチ通信応答せず)	April 3, 1982
9	"Gyo!? Encounter With A Fish"; Transliteration: "Gyo!? Sakana To No Sōgū" (Japanese: ギョ!? 魚との遭遇)	April 10, 1982
10	"It's Painful! Working On A Holiday"; Transliteration: "Tsurai Nā! Kyūjitsu Shukkin" (Japanese: つらいなあ! 休日出勤)	April 17, 1982
11	"Defeat It! The Witch of The Alps"; Transliteration: "Datō! Arupusu No Majo" (Japanese: 打倒! アルプスの魔女)	April 24, 1982
12	"The Great Race To Kyoto"; Transliteration: "Kyōto Mezashite Dai Rēsu" (Japanese: 京都めざして大レース)	May 1, 1982
13	"Australia: That Birth's Secret"; Transliteration: "Ōsutoraria Sono Shussei No Himitsu" (Japanese: 豪・その出生の秘密)	May 8, 1982
14	"Pacific Ocean's Nonstop Balloon Crossing"; Transliteration: "Taiheiyō Muchakuriku Kikyū Ōdan" (Japanese: 太平洋無着陸気球横断)	May 15, 1982
15	"Clear The Traps With The Fake Lease"; Transliteration: "Nise Rīsu De Wana o Hare" (Japanese: にせリースで罠をはれ)	May 22, 1982
16	"Uninvited Beautiful Female Employee"; Transliteration: "Oshikake Bishōjo Shain" (Japanese: おしかけ美少女社員)	May 29, 1982
17	"Infiltrate! Time Lease Company"; Transliteration: "Sen'nyū! Taimurīsu-sha" (Japanese: 潜入! タイムリース社)	June 5, 1982
18	"Search For The Parents of Young Master Haru!"; Transliteration: "Haru Bō No Ryōshin o Sagase!" (Japanese: ハル坊の両親を捜せ!)	June 12, 1982
19	"TV Relay Beblues"; Transliteration: "TV Chūkei Bēburūsu" (Japanese: TV中継ベーブルース)	June 19, 1982
20	"Send Money to the Stone Age!"; Transliteration: "Sekki Jidai Ni Kane Okure!" (Japanese: 石器時代にカネ送れ!)	June 26, 1982
21	"Kosuinen, The Cash-Strapped Manager"; Transliteration: "Kinketsu buchō kosuinen" (Japanese: 金欠部長コスイネン)	July 3, 1982
22	"Magical Torture Ippatsuman!"; Transliteration: "Mahō seme ippatsuman!" (Japanese: 魔法責めイッパツマン!)	July 10, 1982
23	"Combination Impossible! Reversal King"; Transliteration: "Gattai funō! Gyakuten-ō" (Japanese: 合体不能! 逆転王)	July 17, 1982
24	"The Missing Home Baser"; Transliteration: "Kieta hōmubēsā" (Japanese: 消えたホームベーサー)	July 24, 1982
25	"Trouble! Big Spinning Top"; Transliteration: "Komatta! Dai koma-mawashi" (Japanese: こまった! 大コマ回し)	July 31, 1982
26	"Shibibin's Big Makeover"; Transliteration: "Shibibīn dai henshin" (Japanese: シビビーン大変身)	August 7, 1982
27	"A Fierce Battle at the Bottom of the Earth!"; Transliteration: "Chikyū no soko de dai gekisen!" (Japanese: 地球の底で大激戦!)	August 14, 1982
28	"Behold, The Reversal of Sanpantsuman"; Transliteration: "Miyo gyakuten sanpatsuman" (Japanese: 見よ 逆転サンパツマン)	August 21, 1982
29	"The Haunted House was a Big Hit"; Transliteration: "Yūrei yashiki wa dai nigiwai" (Japanese: 幽霊屋敷は大にぎわい)	August 28, 1982
30	"A First for the Series! Evil Wins"; Transliteration: "Shirīzu hatsu! Aku ga katsu" (Japanese: シリーズ初!悪が勝つ)	September 4, 1982
31	"Introducing! Shin Ippatsuman"; Transliteration: "Tōjō! Shin ippatsuman" (Japanese: 登場! 新イッパツマン)	September 11, 1982
32	"Ippatsuman's Big Secret"; Transliteration: "Ippatsuman no dai himitsu" (Japanese: イッパツマンの大秘密)	September 18, 1982
33	"A Montage is Needed"; Transliteration: "Montāju de goyōda" (Japanese: モンタージュで御用だ)	September 25, 1982
34	"Hard Work Training Evil Trio"; Transliteration: "Keppare kenshū aku torio" (Japanese: ケッパレ研修 悪トリオ)	October 2, 1982
35	"Job Change Failure! Kosuinen"; Transliteration: "Tenshoku shippai! Kosuinen" (Japanese: 転職失敗! コスイネン)	October 9, 1982
36	"Who are You? Tamashiro"; Transliteration: "Omae wa nanimono? Kyū Shirō" (Japanese: おまえは何者? 球四郎)	October 16, 1982
37	"2-3, Who was Made into a Spy"; Transliteration: "Supai ni sa reta 2 - 3" (Japanese: スパイにされた2-3)	October 23, 1982
38	"I Found Mr. X!"; Transliteration: "Misutā X mitsuketa!" (Japanese: ミスターX 見つけた!)	October 30, 1982
39	"A Big Pinch! Gou is Captured"; Transliteration: "Dai pinchi! Torawareta Gō" (Japanese: 大ピンチ! 捕われた豪)	November 6, 1982
40	"The Matchmakers were Mr. and Mrs. Kosuinen"; Transliteration: "Nakoudo wa kosuinen fusai" (Japanese: 仲人はコスイネン夫妻)	November 13, 1982
41	"Helper Rescueman"; Transliteration: "Suketto otasukeman" (Japanese: 助っ人オタスケマン)	November 20, 1982
42	"Haruka's Secret Revealed"; Transliteration: "Abaka reta Haruka no himitsu" (Japanese: 暴かれたハルカの秘密)	November 27, 1982
43	"Injured! Haruka is the Target"; Transliteration: "Fushō! Nerawa reta Haruka" (Japanese: 負傷! 狙われたハルカ)	December 4, 1982
44	"Ah, Haruka and Australia's Secret"; Transliteration: "Ā Haruka to Ōsutoraria no himitsu" (Japanese: ああ ハルカと豪の秘密)	December 11, 1982
45	"Chairman Cordo's Mysterious Island"; Transliteration: "Korudō kaichō no nazo no shima" (Japanese: コルドー会長の謎の島)	December 18, 1982
46	"The End of Munmun's Love"; Transliteration: "Munmun koi no owari" (Japanese: ムンムン 恋の終り)	December 25, 1982
47	"First Dream of the Year, Kosuinen's Four Transformations"; Transliteration: "Hatsuyume kosuinen yonhenge" (Japanese: 初夢コスイネン四変化)	January 8, 1983
48	"For 78, Munmun's in Good Condition"; Transliteration: "78-Sai munmun kaichō" (Japanese: 78歳 ムンムン快調)	January 15, 1983
49	"Tamashiro was Dead"; Transliteration: "Kyū Shirō wa shinde ita" (Japanese: 球四郎は死んでいた)	January 22, 1983
50	"Haruka's Subordinate, Minmin"; Transliteration: "Haruka no buka minmin" (Japanese: ハルカの部下 ミンミン)	January 29, 1983
51	"Find the Mysterious Flying Object"; Transliteration: "Nazo no hikō buttai o sagase" (Japanese: 謎の飛行物体をさがせ)	February 5, 1983
52	"Cordo's Mysterious Film"; Transliteration: "Korudō kantoku no Eiga" (Japanese: コルドー監督の迷映画)	February 12, 1983
53	"Betrayed Ippatsuman"; Transliteration: "Uragitta ippatsuman" (Japanese: 裏切ったイッパツマン)	February 19, 1983
54	"Ah, Marriage Haruka and Gou"; Transliteration: "Ā kekkon Haruka to Gō" (Japanese: ああ結婚 ハルカと豪)	February 26, 1983
55	"Honeymooners Under Attack"; Transliteration: "Osowareta hanemūn" (Japanese: 襲われたハネムーン)	March 5, 1983
56	"Do You Know Tamashiro's True Identity"; Transliteration: "Wakaru ka kyū Shirō no shōtai" (Japanese: わかるか 球四郎の正体)	March 12, 1983
57	"Cordo's Surprising Identity"; Transliteration: "Korudō no igaina shōtai" (Japanese: コルドーの意外な正体)	March 19, 1983
58	"A Great Reversal! Victory for Love"; Transliteration: "Dai gyakuten! Ai-yue no shōri" (Japanese: 大逆転! 愛ゆえの勝利)	March 26, 1983
