= Doteraman =

Japanese anime television series

- ドテラマン
- Genre: science fiction
- Created by: Ippei Kuri
- Written by: Takao Koyama
- Directed by: Shinya Sadamitsu
- Music by: Kohei Tanaka
- Opening theme: "Seigi no Shisha Daze Doteraman" by Koorogi'73
- Ending theme: "Motto Boogie Woogie" by Koorogi'73 and Noriko Tsukase
- Country of origin: Japan
- Original language: Japanese
- No. of episodes: 20

Production
- Executive producer: Kenji Yoshida
- Producers: Hidehiko Takei (NTV); Masatoshi Yui (Tatsunoko); Minoru Ohno (Yomiko); Motoki Ueda (Tatsunoko)
- Production company: Tatsunoko Production

Original release
- Network: NNS (NTV)
- Release: October 14, 1986 – February 24, 1987

Doteraman is an anime television series created by Tatsunoko Production.

== Plot ==
Suzuki is a middle-aged entrepreneur who lives in a small town near Tokyo and owns a small business. Despite his hopelessly normal life, he dreams of becoming a celebrity and being popular. One day he happens to discover the entrance to an unknown space. By traveling through it, he reaches a world of goblins and uses a device to make them obey his commands. He uses his newfound minions for his greedy desires and sets his hand to evil things. Meanwhile, Hajime and his girlfriend Mariko come across a strange alien detective who allows them to don the appearance of a goblin. Dressed like the goblins, they transform into Doteraman and Doterapink respectively. With Doteraman's supernatural strength, they challenge the Suzuki and successfully liberate the manipulated goblins.

== Cast ==
- Noriko Tsukase as Satou Hajime
- Chie Koujiro as Nakamura Mariko
- Yuriko Fuchizaki as Onizou
- Isshin Ikeda as Zukan Sokunets
- Jouji Yanami as Suzuki Shigeru / Inchiki-daiou
- Naoko Matsui as Suzuki Manami / Shishunki
- Kenichi Ono as Genki
- Nozomu Sasaki as Tanki
- Ikuo Nishikawa as Inki and Bunta
