= Mon Chéri CoCo =

Japanese manga series by Waki Yamato

- The cover of the first volume of the manga.

モンシェリCoCo
- Manga
- Written by: Waki Yamato
- Published by: Kodansha
- Magazine: Weekly Shoujo Friend
- Volumes: 3
- Anime television series
- Directed by: Kozo Masanobe
- Produced by: Kazuo Sasaki; Kiyoshi Watanabe; Masashi Tadakuma
- Music by: Takashi Ogaki
- Studio: Nippon TV Video
- Original network: TBS
- Original run: August 27, 1972 – November 26, 1972
- Episodes: 13
- icon

Mon Chéri Coco (Japanese: モンシェリCoCo, Hepburn: Monsheri Koko) is a manga by Japanese author Waki Yamato. The manga was originally serialized in Kodansha's Weekly Shoujo Friend magazine in 1971, in issues 17-27. The manga has a total of three volumes and has been published both in Japanese and Chinese. The manga was also adapted into a 1972 TV anime of the same name.

== Story ==
The manga follows the story of a young half-French, half-Japanese girl named Coco Charmant as she tries to become a fashion designer in Paris.

Volumes and Summary
Volume	Plot
1	A fashion photographer named Jér is walking in Paris when he meets a young girl named Coco. Coco follows him to the fashion show of the designer Madame Elle, where Coco crashes the show by jumping on stage in her own original design, a patchwork dress, which becomes a huge hit in Paris. Elle invites Coco to be her assistant and allows Coco to have her own show, but it turns out to be a trap to sabotage Coco's designs. Coco's reputation is tarnished, and Coco then seeks comfort from her ex-boyfriend Daniel. Daniel encourages Coco to follow her dream of becoming a designer, and Coco vows to make a comeback.
2	After her failed show, Coco tries to make a comeback, but Parisians are more interested in the work of the American designer Killey, who is becoming a hit in Paris. Coco recruits a young orphan girl named Angelica to be her model, and the two team up to put on a show for Coco to make her comeback to fashion.
3	After befriending Killey, Coco and Killey head to America to hold a fashion show together in New York. After the show, Coco finds out that her estranged mother is Japanese, and heads to Japan to meet her. After seeing her mother has started a whole new life with a new family, Coco decides to leave, and then reunites with Jér, to whom she is now engaged with.

== Anime adaptation ==
An anime adaptation of the manga aired in 1972. The anime was produced by TBS (Tokyo Broadcasting System), and aired for 13 episodes before being cancelled due to production issues.

=== Episode list ===
Episode List	Title	Original Broadcast Date
1	That Cute Girl (わたしはデザイナー)	August 27, 1972
2	Coco's Cake (ココのケーキやさん)	September 3, 1972
3	I'm a Designer (わたしはデザイナー)	September 10, 1972
4	Someone Who Can't Be Forgotten (わすれられないひと)	September 17, 1972
5	Cry When You Want to Cry (泣きたい時は泣こう)	October 1, 1972
6	A Chance is Coming (チャンス到来)	October 8, 1972
7	A Mean Fashion Show (いじわるなファッションショー)	October 15, 1972
8	Goodbye Again (もう一度さようなら)	October 22, 1972
9	Pinch, Attack! (ピンチだアタック!)	October 29, 1972
10	I'm Not a Child Anymore (もう子どもじゃない)	November 5, 1972
11	Makeover Strategy (じゃまをするなら変身作戦)	November 12, 1972
12	Visiting Mother in Japan (母をたずねて日本へ)	November 19, 1972
13	Happiness from Kyoto to Paris (しあわせは京都からパリへ)	November 26, 1972

=== Cast and characters ===
- Coco Charmant (Akemi Hirokawa)
- Jérôme (Katsuji Mori)
- Angelica (Minori Matsushima)
- Natalie (Noriko Tsukase)
- Baker (Kosei Tomita)
- Cheryl (Haruko Kitahama)
- Madame Elle (Nobuko Maki)
- Lazarev Charmant (Hisashi Katsuta)
- Rieko (Taeko Nakanishi)
