= Itadakiman =

Japanese anime television series

- DVD cover art
- タイムボカンシリーズ イタダキマン
- Genre: Adventure, science fiction, comedy
- Created by: Ippei Kuri; Tatsunoko Production Planning Office
- Developed by: Akiyoshi Sakai
- Directed by: Hiroshi Sasagawa
- Music by: Masaaki Jinbo; Masayuki Yamamoto
- Country of origin: Japan
- Original language: Japanese
- No. of episodes: 20

Production
- Executive producer: Kenji Yoshida
- Producers: Akira Inoue; Minoru Ōno (Yomiko)
- Production companies: Fuji Television; Tatsunoko Production

Original release
- Network: FNS (Fuji TV)
- Release: April 9 – September 24, 1983

Itadakiman (イタダキマン) is the seventh in the Time Bokan series. The show was cancelled after twenty episodes due to low audience ratings. The show's title is a play on the Japanese saying "Itadakimasu", said before beginning a meal.

== Plot ==
The story begins in the year 20XX. Oshaka School in Kamakuland is a world-renowned school where only those who are pure and clearheaded descendants of Priest Sanzo's clan may be admitted. The trio of villains firmly believe they are genuine descendants of Priest Sanzo's clan, although they are of uncertain lineage. They study hard to enter the school in spite of their repeated failure. One day, three intelligent children are called in by the principal and asked to find a set of missing copper plates scattered all over the world. The plates are to be used to complete a puzzle board, which will bring honor to the Oshaka School. The conversation is overheard by the trio of villains, and they decide to stop the youngsters.

== Cast ==
=== Itadakiman ===
- Kusaku Magota/Itadakiman - Mayumi Tanaka

=== Oshaka University ===
- Headmaster Ochaka - Hirō Oikawa
- Kanno-sensei - Yuri Nashiwa
- Oshakan-tori - Kei Tomiyama

=== Tatemae Trio ===
- Houko Sanzo - Hiromi Oikawa
- Shago Jo - Bin Shimada
- Chō Hakko - Tomohiro Nishimura

=== Dirt Cheap Trio ===
- Yan-Yan - Noriko Ohara
- Dasainen - Jōji Yanami
- Tonmentan - Kazuya Tatekabe
- Ryuko - Chika Sakamoto

=== Other ===
- Narrator - Kei Tomiyama

== Episode list ==
No.	Title	Original release date
1	"A Close Call at Oshaka University"; Transliteration: "Oshaka gakuen kikiippatsu!!" (Japanese: オシャカ学園危機イッパツ！！)	April 9, 1983
2	"The Heart-Pounding Swimsuit Contest"; Transliteration: "Dokkiri mizugi kontesuto!" (Japanese: ドッキリ水着コンテスト！)	April 16, 1983
3	"Huh! Yan-Yan is Having a Baby?"; Transliteration: "Etsu! yanyan ni akachan ga?" (Japanese: エッ!ヤンヤンに赤ちゃんが？)	April 23, 1983
4	"Laugh, Laugh and be Cheerful"; Transliteration: "Waratte waratte neaka nina re" (Japanese: 笑って笑ってネアカになれ)	May 7, 1983
5	"Konkon Love Story"; Transliteration: "Konkon. rabusutori" (Japanese: こんこん・らぶストーリー)	May 14, 1983
6	"Is That Even Possible? The Great Plan"; Transliteration: "Sonnakoto ari daisakusen" (Japanese: そんなことアリ？！大作戦)	May 21, 1983
7	"If You Eat That, It's Over!"; Transliteration: "Sorewo kutsutta raoshimaiyo!" (Japanese: それを食ったらおしまいよ！)	May 28, 1983
8	"Love Computer Bride Strategy"; Transliteration: "Koi pyuta hanayo me sakusen!" (Japanese: 恋ピューター花嫁作戦)	June 4, 1983
9	"Don't Show It! That Secret"; Transliteration: "Mise teha dame yo! sono himitsu" (Japanese: 見せてはダメよ！その秘密)	June 18, 1983
10	"I Can't Give it Away! Not This One Thing"; Transliteration: "Agerarenai! koredakeha" (Japanese: あげられない！これだけは)	June 25, 1983
11	"Cheers, Young Master!"; Transliteration: "Kanpai! bocchan sensei" (Japanese: かんぱい!ぼっちゃん先生)	July 2, 1983
12	"The Miracle of the Rose of Urusailles"; Transliteration: "Kiseki urusaiyu no bara monogatari" (Japanese: 奇跡ウルサイユのバラ物語)	July 9, 1983
13	"School Bite-bite Panic!"; Transliteration: "Gakuen gajigajipanikku!" (Japanese: 学園ガジガジパニック！)	July 30, 1983
14	"Ikkyuyama's Itadaki Quiz!"; Transliteration: "Ikkyū yama no itadakikuizu!" (Japanese: 一休山のイタダキクイズ！)	August 13, 1983
15	"Beware of Kisses on the Beach!"; Transliteration: "Hamabe no kissu nigo yōjin!" (Japanese: 浜辺のキッスにご用心！)	August 27, 1983
16	"Ryuko-chan is also a Woman"; Transliteration: "Ryūko chanmo onna dearinsu" (Japanese: 竜子ちゃんも女でありんす)	September 3, 1983
17	"Crossing the Legendary Tendon Mountain!"; Transliteration: "Maboroshi no ten don yama wo koe te!" (Japanese: 幻の天ドン山を越えて)	September 10, 1983
18	"Beautiful Towns Often Have Traps!"; Transliteration: "Kireina machi niha wana gaaru!" (Japanese: きれいな町には罠がある！)	September 17, 1983
19	"Pushman vs Tar-san"; Transliteration: "Pusshuman VS tāsan" (Japanese: プッシュマンVSターサン)	Unaired (later released direct-to-video)
20	"Where Are You Going, Itadakiman?"; Transliteration: "Itadakiman yodokohe iku" (Japanese: イタダキマンよどこへ行く)	September 24, 1983
