= Rescueman =

Japanese anime television series

- タイムボカンシリーズ タイムパトロール隊 オタスケマン
- Genre: Adventure science fiction
- Created by: Tatsunoko Production Planning Office
- Directed by: Hiroshi Sasagawa
- Music by: Masaaki Jinbo; Masayuki Yamamoto
- Country of origin: Japan
- Original language: Japanese
- No. of episodes: 53

Production
- Executive producer: Kenji Yoshida
- Producers: Masaru Shibata; Nagateru Kato; Hiroshi Iwata
- Editors: Yukio Tanigawa; Yoshihiko Yamatani; Hajime Taniguchi; Eiko Nishide; Yutaka Murakami; Masami Tashiro
- Production companies: Fuji Television; Tatsunoko Production

Original release
- Network: FNS (Fuji TV)
- Release: February 2, 1980 – January 31, 1981

Rescueman, known in Japan as Time Patrol Tai Otasukeman (タイムボカンシリーズ タイムパトロール隊 オタスケマン, Taimubokanshirīzu Taimupatorōru-tai Otasukeman), is the fourth in the Time Bokan series.

== Summary ==
Burning with ambitions to become the most beautiful woman, the most renowned scientist, and the greatest hero the world has ever known, three villains - Atasha, Sekobitchi, and Duwarusuki - join forces. The trio appear as Time Patrollers, the keepers and protectors of the annals of history, but this is only a cover for the trio, as the villains are in league with a nefarious leader, who is trying to alter the course of history to suit his desires. Under the instructions of their leader, the trio travel in time with the aim of tampering with recorded history. Only Hikaru and Nana, disguised as the Rescuemen, stand between the villains and their goals.

== Cast ==
=== Rescueman/Otasukeman ===
- Hikaru - Yū Mizushima
- Nana - Saeko Shimazu

=== Endangerman/Ojamaman ===
- Atasha - Noriko Ohara
- Sekobicchi - Jōji Yanami
- Dowalsuki - Kazuya Tatekabe
- Gekigasuki - Masayuki Yamamoto

=== Others ===
- Chief Tonnan - Junpei Takiguchi
- Official Onuki - Yoshito Miyamura, Ikuo Nishikawa, and Satoru Itagaki
- Doctor Sasayabu - Kei Tomiyama
- Athletic Chief Miyamoto - Yoshito Miyamura
- Tonmanomanto - Masaru Ikeda
- Narrator - Kei Tomiyama
