= Kumiko Takizawa =

Japanese voice actress (1952–2022)

- 滝沢 久美子
- Born: August 11, 1952; Japan
- Died: June 11, 2022 (aged 69)
- Citizenship: Japanese
- Occupation: Voice actress
- Years active: 1980–2022

Kumiko Takizawa (Japanese: 滝沢 久美子, Hepburn: Takizawa Kumiko; August 21, 1952 – June 11, 2022) was a Japanese voice actress from Tokyo, Japan. She died on June 11, 2022, at the age of 69 due to heart attack.

== Filmography ==
=== Anime ===
- Makiko Shikishima in Tetsujin 28-go (1980)
- Midori Kurenai in Hell Girl
- Hazuki's Grandmother in Ojamajo Doremi
- Sawako Sawanoguchi in Magic User's Club (TV)
- Grandis Granva in Nadia: The Secret of Blue Water
- "Medusa no kimi" Katsuragi in Oniisama e...
- Amia in The Ultraman (1979-1980)
- Akemi Tamano in Wedding Peach
- Dunfin in The Wonderful Adventures of Nils
- Kurama's Mother in Yu Yu Hakusho
- Ayame Sujita in Mirai Robo Daltanious

=== Dubbing ===
- Gizmo in Gremlins (Japanese dub)
- Newt in Aliens (1988 Japanese dub)
- Annabelle in All Dogs Go to Heaven (Japanese dub)
- Missy in Bill & Ted's Bogus Journey (Japanese dub)
- Nora Carpenter in Final Destination 2 (Japanese dub)
- Frigga in Thor (Japanese dub)
- Frigga in Avengers: Endgame (Japanese dub)
- Tania in Enter the Dragon (Japanese dub)
- Ellis Grey in Grey's Anatomy (Japanese dub)
- Margaret Roberts in Mad Love (Japanese dub)
