= Yattodetaman =

Japanese anime television series

- Original poster art
- タイムボカンシリーズ ヤットデタマン
- Genre: Adventure, science fiction, fantasy
- Created by: Tatsunoko Production Planning Office
- Directed by: Hiroshi Sasagawa
- Music by: Masaaki Jinbo; Masayuki Yamamoto
- Country of origin: Japan
- Original language: Japanese
- No. of episodes: 52

Production
- Executive producer: Kenji Yoshida
- Producers: Ippei Kuri; Akira Inoue; Minoru Uchima (Yomiko)
- Production companies: Tatsunoko Production; Fuji Television

Original release
- Network: FNS (Fuji TV)
- Release: February 7, 1981 – February 6, 1982

Yattodetaman (ヤットデタマン) is the fifth installment in the Time Bokan series, produced by Tatsunoko Production and directed by Hiroshi Sasagawa. The series depicts a succession crisis. Two royal houses battle for the power to rule the Kingdom of Fir. In order to secure the Kingdom, two representatives go back in time to find the mythical Firebird, which will allow its bearer to become the rightful ruler.

== Plot ==
1000 years in the future, the king who governed the kingdom of Fir, died. An evil dynasty conformed from the capricious Prince Kamaro, his sister Princess Mirenjo, and their two minions (the mechanic Julie Kokematsu and the guard Alan Sukadon) conspire with the objective of governing the kingdom with Kamaro as king. However, a major technicality prevents Kamaro from succeeding with his plan, because whoever finds the mystic Firebird first will become the new and rightful monarch.

The Firebird travels throughout time and space in the past, disguised as mystic objects of legends, and the evil villains want to capture it. The honorable daughter of the deceased king, Princess Karen, and her guard-robot, Daigoron, travel towards 1981 to ask for help from his ancestors, Wataru Toki and Koyomu Himekuri, in locating the Firebird. When the villains take advantage of the heroes, Wataru Toki transforms into Yattodetaman before fighting against the trio in a comedic battle.

== Cast ==
=== Heroes ===
- Wataru Toki/Yattodetaman - Kazuyuki Sogabe
- Koyomi Himekuri - Masako Miura
- Karen-hime - Mika Doi
- Daigoron - Yūsaku Yara
- Kingorou Tōyama - Osamu Saka

=== Villains ===
- Mirenjo-hime - Noriko Ohara
- Julie Kokematsu - Jōji Yanami
- Alan Sukadon - Kazuya Tatekabe
- Baron Donfanfan - Masayuki Yamamoto
- Prince Komaro - Hiroko Maruyama

=== Others ===
- Sasayaki - Kei Tomiyama
- Koyama - Kazuya Tatekabe
- Dara-sen'nin - Ichirō Nagai
- Narrator - Kei Tomiyama

== Episodes ==
No.	Title	Original release date
1	"Discovery!! Messenger from the future" "hakken!! mirai karano shisha" (発見!!未来からの使者)	February 7, 1981
2	"The lover appears to Princess Mirenjo" "mirenjo hime ni koibito tōjō" (ミレンジョ姫に恋人登場)	February 14, 1981
3	"Silver dog in a Edo tenement house" "edo no nagaya no gin no inu" (江戸の長屋の銀の犬)	February 21, 1981
4	"The golden reindeer returns" "fukkatsu! ōgon no tonakai" (復活！黄金のトナカイ)	February 28, 1981
5	"Prince Komaro of Egypt?" "ejiputo no ōji komaro?" (エジプトの王子コマロ？)	March 7, 1981
6	"I found it! The tree of immortality" "mitsu keta! furōchōju no ki" (見つけた！不老長寿の木)	March 14, 1981
7	"The great sinking of Atlantis!" "atoranteisu dai chinbotsu!" (アトランティス大沈没！)	March 21, 1981
8	"Nobunaga's sandal flew off!" "nobunaga no zōri ga ton da!" (信長のゾウリが飛んだ！)	April 28, 1981
9	"The genius painter's model is a pig" "tensai gaka no moderu ha buta" (天才画家のモデルはブタ)	May 4, 1981
10	"The kappa's robbery operation" "kappa no kapparai sakusen" (カッパのかっぱらい作戦)	May 11, 1981
11	"Seppuku! Mirenjo Gang" "seppuku! mirenjo hitoaji" (切腹！ミレンジョ一味)	May 18, 1981
12	"Jujack's dangerous acrobatics" "abunau shi jujakku no kyokugei" (危うしジュジャックの曲芸)	May 25, 1981
13	"Here comes Jujack the Tengu" "deta zo jujakku tengu" (出たぞジュジャック天使)	May 21, 1981
14	"Kokematsu's bag of tears" "kokematsu ā namida no fukuro hari" (コケマツあゝ涙の袋はり)	May 28, 1981
15	"The salary I've been waiting for finally came" "matte ta kyūryō yatto deta" (待ってた給料やっと出た)	May 16, 1981
16	"Chase the tear-born mouse!" "oe! namida dekaita nezumi" (追え！涙でかいたネズミ)	May 23, 1981
17	"Tarzan in 3001" "3001 nen no tazan" (3001年のターザン)	May 30, 1981
18	"Robinson Crusoe's second voyage" "robinson nidome no hyōryū" (ロビンソン二度目の漂流)	June 6, 1981
19	"Treasure! The magic hammer" "hihō! uchide no koduchi" (秘宝！打出のこづち)	June 13, 1981
20	"Sing passionately Donfanfan!" "nesshō! donfanfan" (熱唱！ドンファンファン)	June 20, 1981
21	"Mirenjo's magnificent transformation" "mirenjo karei naru henshin" (ミレンジョ華麗なる変身)	June 27, 1981
22	"After Snow White" "sorekarano shirayukihime" (それからの白雪姫)	July 4, 1981
23	"Invisible demon mecha vs Daikyojin" "tōmei oni meka vs dai kyojin" (透明鬼メカVS大巨神)	July 11, 1981
24	"Jujack the red rose" "jujaku ha akai bara" (ジュジャクは赤いバラ)	July 18, 1981
25	"Daibajin's Great space battle" "daibajin uchū no dai kessen" (大馬神宇宙の大決戦)	July 25, 1981
26	"Sparks of Love! The Baron vs Hikaru Genji" "koi no hibana! hakushaku tsui kōgen shi" (恋の火花!伯爵対光源氏)	August 1, 1981
27	"Suicide! The four villains of the Himalayas" "jibaku! himaraya no shi akunin" (自爆！ヒマラヤの四悪人)	August 8, 1981
28	"Pigs falling from the sky" "Sora kara buta ga futte kuru" (空からブタが降ってくる)	August 15, 1981
29	"A gift from Santa" "santa gamoratta okurimono" (サンタがもらった贈り物)	August 22, 1981
30	"Jujack's mysterious shadow in the shadows" "jujaku no inni nazo no kage" (ジュジャクの陰に謎の影)	August 29, 1981
31	"A great lie! Daibajin's hymn" "dai uso! daibajin sanka" (大ウソ！大馬神賛歌)	September 5, 1981
32	"Wataru's great turtle transformation" "wataru ga kame ni taihen mi" (ワタルがカメに大変身)	September 12, 1981
33	"Jujack's shadow is the Baron?" "jujaku no kage ni hakushaku?" (ジュジャクの影に伯爵？)	September 19, 1981
34	"Kokematsu finally asks to resign" "kokematsu tsuini taishoku negai" (コケマツついに退職願い)	September 26, 1981
35	"Did you catch Jujack?" "jujaku tsukamaeta?" (ジュジャクつかまえた？)	October 3, 1981
36	"Altamira's monkey show" "arutamira no saru shibai" (アルタミラの猿芝居)	October 10, 1981
37	"Critical condition! Kingoro's in a big pinch" "jūtai! kingorō dai pinchi" (重体！金五郎大ピンチ)	October 17, 1981
38	"Dynamite bang bang" "dainamaitobanban" (ダイナマイトバンバン)	October 24, 1981
39	"The eccentric electric Unadon" "ereki una donburi dai kijin" (エレキうな丼大奇人)	October 31, 1981
40	"It's the sixth anniversary! The stage show" "roku shūnen dayo! butaichūkei (bangai-hen)" (六周年だよ！舞台中継（番外編))	November 7, 1981
41	"The strange candy house" "okashina okashi no ie" (おかしなお菓子の家)	November 14, 1981
42	"Mecha Ninja vs Sasuke Sarutobi" "meka ninpō vs sarutobisasuke" (メカ忍法VS猿飛佐助)	November 21, 1981
43	"A rejuvenated Princess Mirenjo" "jaku gaetta mirenjo hime?" (若がえったミレンジョ姫？)	November 28, 1981
44	"Formidable yokai mecha Zashiki Warashi" "kyōteki・yōkai meka zashiki warashi" (「強敵・妖怪メカ座敷わらし)	December 5, 1981
45	"The Time Camel's maze" "taimurakuda mayoi michi" (タイムラクーダ迷い道)	December 12, 1981
46	"Let's be tempted, Daruma-san" "daruma san yūwaku shimasho" (ダルマさん誘惑しましょ)	December 19, 1981
47	"A propopsal to Count Koyomi" "hakushaku koyomi ni puropozu" (伯爵コヨミにプロポーズ)	December 26, 1981
48	"Jujack the gourd" "hyōtanni jujaku" (ひょうたんにジュジャク)	January 9, 1982
49	"Tyrant Nero vs Kingoro" "bōkun nero vs kingorō" (暴君ネロVS金五郎)	January 16, 1982
50	"Suspicion Donfanfan" "giwaku? donfanfan" (疑惑?ドンファンファン)	January 23, 1982
51	"The search for Jujack ends" "saigo no jujaku sagashi" (最後のジュジャクさがし)	January 30, 1982
52	"Revive the kingdom of Nandara" "yomigaere! nandara ōkoku" (「甦れ!ナンダーラ王国)	February 6, 1982
