= Time Bokan =

1975 anime television series

- Cover art from the original soundtrack
- タイムボカン
- Created by: Tatsunoko Production Planning Office
- Directed by: Hiroshi Sasagawa (chief)
- Music by: Masayuki Yamamoto
- Opening theme: "Time Bokan" by Masayuki Yamamoto
- Ending theme: "Soreyuki Gaikottsu" by Royal Knights
- Country of origin: Japan
- No. of episodes: 61 (list of episodes)

Production
- Executive producer: Tatsuo Yoshida
- Producers: Masaru Shibata; Masashi Nagai
- Editors: Hajime Taniguchi; Reiko Toda; Junyasu Furukawa
- Production companies: Fuji Television; Tatsunoko Production

Original release
- Network: FNS (Fuji TV)
- Release: October 4, 1975 – December 25, 1976

Related
- Time Bokan: Royal Revival; Time Bokan 24

Time Bokan (タイムボカン, Taimu Bokan) is a Japanese anime series first aired on Fuji TV from October 4, 1975, to December 25, 1976, throughout Japan every Saturday at 6:30 pm, with a total of 61 thirty-minute episodes. It was produced by Tatsunoko Production, who later produced a number of spin-off programs as part of the "Time Bokan Series". An anime re-imagining titled Time Bokan 24 ran from October 1, 2016, to March 18, 2017.

== Story ==
Dr. Kieta, a somewhat wacky but intelligent scientist, has finally succeeded in inventing insect-shaped time machines called "Time Bokan". To prove the machine's efficiency and safety, he decides to serve as the very first guinea pig for its maiden voyage. However, by the time his machine has returned, there's no trace of him inside. The only thing that it returns with is a talking parrot, along with a large gemstone called the Dynamond (ダイナモンド, Dainamondo), which is seemingly the most powerful and valuable jewel in the world.

Now it's up to a search party, founded by Dr Kieta's lab assistant Tanpei, to travel through time to find Dr Kieta, but it seems that someone is looking for the "Dynamond" as well.

The story starred two vividly opposing sides, the heroes, and the villains. Typical plots follow this format:

- The heroes travel to a particular era or space during their search for Dr. Kieta, and their hunt for the nature of the Dynamond, meeting the famous historical figures (and some times fictional characters) in the process.
- The heroes eventually encounter the villains.
- The two sides battle each other with their time machines.
- The villains always suffer a crushing defeat, either due to the smart foiling of their plans from the heroes, or due to the villains' own ineptitude.

== Characters ==
=== Heroes ===
Tanpei (丹平) (voiced by Yoshiko Ōta): The loyal lab assistant of Dr. Kieta, Tanpei is a smart and sporty boy, aged 13. He is warm, pure, courageous, and is a genius mechanic. He is often seen sparring with Junko, his fellow assistant and Dr Kieta's granddaughter, comforting, or encouraging her. Tampei has been depicted as having a crush on her for more than once. Everybody in the team calls him "Tanpei-chan". Not much of his family and school background is given.

Junko (淳子) (voiced by Mari Okamoto and Keiko Yokozawa in eps. 34-36): Junko is Dr. Kieta's 10 year-old granddaughter. She is a responsible young girl and is always lending a helping hand to others. She is gentle, caring, erudite, and resourceful. She misses her grandfather dearly, thus earning a lot of sympathy from the rest of her team as they search for him. She might seem a little whiny at first glance, but vows to become stronger under the influence of Tanpei, whom she has a crush on.

C-robot (チョロ坊, Chorobō) (voiced by Reiko Katsura): A robot sidekick created by Tanpei, he can appear pretty childish in both appearance and actions, but this is not always a hindrance. His power source is the winding key protruding from his back. Chorobo's features include also a flamethrower built into his nose, extendable limbs, and the ability to shock others with a significant amount of voltage output. Although a robot, he's seen briefly eating cream puffs in the second episode.

Dr. Kieta (木江田博士, Kieta-hakase) (voiced by Ryūji Saikachi): Junko's grandfather and creator of the "Time Bokan" time machines. A famous scientist, he wasn't found until the 27th episode, but soon joined Tanpei's team on other journeys.

Perasuke (ペラ助) (voiced by Junpei Takiguchi): A talking parrot who seems to be the only source of information about Dr. Kieta's location after he was lost in time; he always makes random testimonies on that. The only thing he fears is probably his wife, Otake. It turns out that he accidentally triggered the time machine while Dr. Kieta was absent in a particular age (which turned out to be the present day), and returned to the lab with it. After the journey he took with our heroes, he reunited with his wife in the finale. His voice can be heard in the previews of upcoming episodes at the end of each episode before the ending theme. His name is a pun on his species.

Otake-san (オタケさん) (voiced by Haru Endou): A bossy and impatient female parrot of Perasuke's kind and his wife. She is depicted with a distinct air of vanity and a body frame much larger than Perasuke's. She is also frequently kicking Perasuke about, despite her love for him. At the beginning of the series, she and Dr. Kieta are frequently soothing each other's eagerness of reunion.

=== Villains ===
Commonly known as the "Time Skeletons" ("タイム ガイコツ") through the show, the three villains portrayed in this show were even more familiar to the audience than the heroes, mainly due to their renowned stupidity, shown by their inevitable fate of always suffering a crushing defeat in each episode. They also were the inspiration for the "Team Rocket" trio in the Pokémon TV series, and by extension a number of similar anime villains.

Majo (マージョ) (voiced by Noriko Ohara): Majo, 30 years old, is the attractive blonde female leader of the trio. Her character was written as a "vain villainess" stereotype; accordingly, she often acts and speaks as if she were the most beautiful and intelligent character in the entire series. Of the trio, she is the most enthusiastic about capturing the "Dynamond", but ends up doing virtually nothing except bossing her two henchmen around, invariably cursing them after the "defeat" sequence in each episode, as well as ending up naked as a result of some misfortune. Her name is derived from the Japanese word "魔女" (majo), which means "witch".

Grocky (グロッキー, Gurokkī) (voiced by Jouji Yanami): The "brainiac" henchman of Majo, aged 25. He used to work undercover for Dr. Kieda, therefore he is usually employed to build a new and different mecha in each episode to counter the Time Bokan used by the heroes. He is cunning, though quite prone to making silly mistakes on the machinery (most of which became the key issue of the villains' misfortune throughout the episodes). His name is derived from the Japanicized word for "grotesque". The character of Waluigi is partially inspired by him.

Warusa (ワルサー, Warusā) (voiced by Kazuya Tatekabe): The "muscle" henchman of Majo, aged 35. He is seemingly less intelligent and more clumsy than the other two of the trio, and is often seen controlling the weaponry of their mecha. He is heard speaking in an accent known as Kansai-ben and frequently ends his sentences with the phrase "~man-nen" (~まんねん). His name is a play on the Japanese term "悪さ" (warusa), which means "evil behavior" or "level of evil". The character of Wario is partially inspired by him.

=== Others ===
Narrator (voiced by Kei Tomiyama): His voice is mainly used to introduce the different eras/spaces the characters travel to, and sometimes he also gives a brief comment or overview on the episode, especially at the end.

== Time Bokan machines ==
Created by Dr. Kieda at the beginning of the series, there are a total of three machines. Each one is designed after a particular kind of insect, both appearance-wise and functionally. Although the term "time" is the only term in their name to state their function, they are also capable of travelling between dimensions, including fictional and hypothetical ones. An example of the former is a dimension based on Grimm's fairytales, while an example of the latter is one based on Easter Island.

Time Mechabuton ("タイムメカブトン", Time Bokan I): This blue machine, which resembles a Japanese rhinoceros beetle, is the Time Bokan used the most by the heroes. Its features include:

- The machine's primary weapon, a rotary saw/digger fashioned like the beetle's large single horn.
- Durable all-terrain tires, enabling the machine to travel to a maximum of 200 km/h (approx. 125 MPH).
- Wings, which open like the actual insect's, allowing flight when powered by its jet engines. They can also be used to flap to create sandstorms by flapping.
- A defensive missile launcher mounted in the bow.
- A small red dome on its back; it is a manually-piloted scouting/surveillance airship named the "Ladybug-Drone" (テントウキ, Tentōki), which can either operate on its own, or to simply serve as a lookout post of the main machine. It includes a series of wacky gadgets and tools, including mechanical limbs, shears, fire extinguishers, reflectors, nets, slingshots, and others.
- A small submarine, the "Strider-Marine" (ヤゴマリン, Yagomarin), hidden in its belly.
- A remote control of the whole system is incorporated in the watch of Dr. Kieda.

Time Dotabattan ("タイムドタバッタン", Time Bokan II): This green, locust-shaped Time Bokan was actually captured by Dr. Kieda in the 27th episode from a species known as "Insect People", the seemingly futuristic dominant species of Earth. It is modified later in the series to increase its functionality and transport capacity. Its features include:

- The machine's primary weapon, a projectile launcher mounted in the bow of the machine.
- Strong mechanical limbs like the actual insect's, allowing the machine to jump great distances. Once damaged, their functions can be replaced by a set of retractable caterpillar tracks, hidden in the machine's belly.
- A pair of small rudders that allows the machine to fly when powered by its jet engines.
- A worm-shaped scouting/surveillance unit, the "Inchworm-Drone" (シャクトリン, Jakutorin), which can operate on its own to complete maintenance work, such as repairing the machines. The heroes have often used it to sneak behind the villains' mecha and cause havoc on more than one occasion.
- A small helicopter, the "Firefly-Copter" (ヘリボタル, Heribotaru), hidden inside.

Time Kuwagattan ("タイムクワガッタン", Time Bokan III): This red, stag beetle-shaped Time Bokan was created later by Dr. Kieda after he was found. Its features include:

- The machine's primary weapon, a cutter/digger fashioned like the beetle's horns.
- Limbs that can become wheels.
- The machine's carapace, also fashioned like the actual beetle's, opens up like the rotor of a helicopter, allowing the machine to fly.
- A bee-shaped scouting/surveillance airship, the "Honeybee-Drone" (ビーチクリン, Biichikurin).
- A small, woodlice-shaped all-terrain vehicle, the "Armadillo-Rollin'" (ダンゴロリン, Dangororin), hidden inside.

Note: Although written in katakana, "Bokan" can mean "carrier" (such as an "aircraft carrier") if written in hiragana or kanji, as each of the main machines carries a few smaller mechas with them at all times.

== Villains' machines ==
Only one recurring mecha has ever appeared in the villain trio's garage: the "Time Skull" ("タイムガイコッツ"), a small, skull-shaped time machine built by Grocky.

In order to match the Time Bokan in strength and maneuverability, this mecha is often linked to a larger mechanical structure, of which it serves as the head. This construction often results in various animal-shaped mechas as large as (or even larger than) the Time Bokan. These machines are often equipped with an abundance of concealed gadgets and weapons, most of which are capable of leaving the heroes' machines severely damaged.

Two running gags exist for the villains' mecha in the show. First, after the mechas' departure in a large bang, a few stray parts can always be seen on the floor when the explosion clears. In the first few episodes of the show, the director used the same group of pictures, which depicted exactly same stray parts to emphasize this gag. Second, the villains rarely have a smooth landing on their arrival, always ending up either in awkward poses or locations.

The most important feature of these mecha is a deadly device that villains wish to use to finish the heroes off for good, dubbed as the "Highlight of the Week" ("今週のハイライト") by the villains (usually in the shape of a bomb launched in various crazy fashions). However, the triggering of the device often backfires onto the villains themselves, either by a silly error in its mechanical design or as a result of the villains' foiling by the heroes, causing the whole structure to explode spectacularly, only leaving the Time Skull fully intact and the villains themselves very tattered (Grocky is victimized every time by his female boss for the failure).

== Timefighters ==
Several of the historical-themed episodes were edited together and dubbed by Jim Terry Productions (of Force Five and Robby the Rascal fame) for the US home video market in 1984, under the name Timefighters. Several of the fairytale-themed episodes were also edited together and dubbed by Jim Terry Productions for the US home video market in 1984, under the name Timefighters in the Land of Fantasy.

Name changes:

- Time Bokan/Time Fighters
- Tanpei/Jett
- Junko/Starr
- C-robot/Tonk
- Dr. Kieta/Professor Von Spock
- Perasuke/Squarky
- Otake/Bromhilder
- Skull Trio/Skulduggery Crew
- Marjo/Lucinda Skulduggery
- Grocky/Captain Arrow
- Walsa/Mungo
- Time Mechabuton - Time Bokan I: The Scorpion II
- Time Dotabattan - Time Bokan II: The Grasshopper (initially, it was referred to as the prototype time machine, only able to transport one passenger; later, it was refitted to carry a whole crew)
- Time Kuwagattan - Time Bokan III: The Ant

Even Harmony Gold released a TV film in 1985 as Time Patrol.
