= List of Yatterman (2008 TV series) episodes =

This is a list of episodes for the remake of the Japanese anime series Yatterman. The anime was first aired in Japan on NTV and Yomiuri TV from January 14, 2008, to September 27, 2009. The series contains sixty episodes.

== Episodes ==
No.	Title	Original air date on NTV and Yomiuri TV
1	"Yatterman is Born, Dakoron (The Birth of Yatterman)"; Transliteration: "Yatterman Tanjou, Dakoron" (Japanese: ヤッターマン 誕生だコロン!)	January 14, 2008
Weekly Stage Location: Tokyo, Akasaka
2	"The Deciding Takoyaki King of Naniwa, Dakoron (The Takoyaki King)"; Transliteration: "Naniwa no Takoyakiou Ketteida, Dakoron" (Japanese: ナニワのたこ焼王決定だコロン!)	January 21, 2008
Weekly Stage Location: Osaka
3	"Get the Bacademy Award, Dakoron (Lights, Camera, Yatterman)"; Transliteration: "Bakademii Shouwotoru no, Dakoron" (Japanese: バカデミー賞を獲るのだコロン!)	January 29, 2008
Weekly Stage Location: United States' California, Hollywood Note: First Skull Ring Obtained.
4	Transliteration: "Kita no Kuni Kyara Nisen-Hachi, Dakoron" (Japanese: 北の国キャラ2008だコロン!)	February 4, 2008
Weekly Stage Location: Hokkaidō, Sapporo
5	"The Prince and the Chocolate Castle, Dakoron (The Prince's Chocolate Castle)"; Transliteration: "Ouji to Chokoretto jou, Dakoron" (Japanese: 王子とチョコレート城だコロン!)	February 11, 2008
Weekly Stage Location: Czech Republic, Prague
6	"The Flower Capital's Fashion, Dakoron (Fashion Food Fight)"; Transliteration: "Hana no Miyako Fashion, Dakoron" (Japanese: 花の都のファッションだコロン!)	February 18, 2008
Weekly Stage Location: France, Paris
7	"It's Also Hard Being Celebrity Sisters (Betting It On)"; Transliteration: "Serebu Shimai mo Tsuraiyo, Dakoron" (Japanese: セレブ姉妹もつらいよだコロン!)	February 25, 2008
Weekly Stage Location: Monaco Guest Stars: Kano Sisters as Themselves (Katherine "Kathy" and Mika Kano)
8	"Infiltrate Odaiba Television, Dakoron (Odaiba Air Time)"; Transliteration: "Odaiba Terebi ni Senyuu, Dakoron" (Japanese: おだいばテレビに潜入だコロン!)	March 3, 2008
Weekly Stage Location: Tokyo, Odaiba Note: Second Skull Ring Obtained.
9	"Otankhamen's Curse, Dakoron (Battle of the Pyramids)"; Transliteration: "Otankaamen no Noroi, Dakoron" (Japanese: オタンカーメンの呪いだコロン!)	March 10, 2008
Weekly Stage Location: Egypt
10	"Tiger Drama Atsuhime, Dakoron (Volcanic Panic)"; Transliteration: "Taiga Dorama Atsuhime, Dakoron" (Japanese: タイガードラマーアツヒメだコロン!)	March 17, 2008
Weekly Stage Location: Kagoshima
11	"(A Hunka, Hunka Burning Yatter-Love)"; Transliteration: "Doronjo Sama wa Otoshigoro, Dakoron" (Japanese: ドロンジョ様はお年頃だコロン!)	April 14, 2008
Weekly Stage Location: Miyazaki Prefecture
12	"(Fear and Loathing in Viva Las Vegas)"; Transliteration: "Omocchama Kiki Ippatsu, Dakoron" (Japanese: オモッチャマ危機一髪だコロン!)	April 28, 2008
Weekly Stage Location: United States, Nevada, Las Vegas
12.5	"(Yatterman, The Great Battle)"; Transliteration: "Konya Kagiri no Doronbo Tai Minomonta! Anata mo isshoni Nouryoku Taiketsu! Gatchaman ya Mahha go mo Toujou Supesharu, Dakoron" (Japanese: 今夜限りのドロンボーVSみのもんた! アナタも一緒に脳力対決!!ガッチャマンやマッハ号も登場スペシャルだコロン!)	May 5, 2008
Weekly Stage Location: Tokyo, Minato Guest Stars: Monta Mino, Masami Hisamoto and Nobuko Miyazaki as Themselves (Mortimer "Morty" Minori, Minnie Hisamoto and Natalie Miyazaki), Katsuji Mori as Go Mifune (Speed Racer), his Mach 5 and Gatchaman AKA Ken the Eagle. Notes: First one-hour special. A movie poster for Detective Conan: Full Score of Fear can be seen in a brief cameo. This episode features scenes from the first episode of the original 1977 version.
13	"(Happy Go Ducky)"; Transliteration: "Burari Sugamo no Karisuma, Dakoron" (Japanese: ぶらり巣鴨のカリスマだコロン!)	May 12, 2008
Weekly Stage Location: Tokyo, Sugamo
14	"(YatterPelican takes off)" Transliteration: "Yatta-Perikan Toujou, Dakoron" (Japanese: ヤッターペリカン登場だコロン!)	May 19, 2008
Weekly Stage Location: Earth (Stone Age) Notes: First Appearance of Yatter Pellican.
15	"(YatterWan and YatterPelican: Friends to the End)"; Transliteration: "Yatta-Meka ga Nakama-Ware? Dakoron" (Japanese: ヤッターメカが仲間割れ? だコロン!)	June 16, 2008
Weekly Stage Location: Kanagawa Prefecture, Yokohama
16	"(Crouching Monkey, Hidden Dog)"; Transliteration: "Gokuu Sagashi wa Gokuurou, Dakoron" (Japanese: 悟空探しはゴクウロウだコロン!)	June 23, 2008
Weekly Stage Location: People's Republic of China
17	"(Treasure Hunt)"; Transliteration: "Otakara Kantei nara Puraisuresu, Dakoron" (Japanese: お宝鑑定ならプライスレスだコロン!)	June 30, 2008
Weekly Stage Location: Ishikawa Prefecture, Kanazawa
18	"(In the Good Old Days)"; Transliteration: "OldDays Shitamachi no Hibi, Dakoron" (Japanese: OldDays 下町の夕日だコロン!)	July 7, 2008
Weekly Stage Location: Tokyo, Roppongi (Year 1955)
19	"(Fitness Freak)"; Transliteration: "Mujintou de Buutare-Kyanpu, Dakoron" (Japanese: 無人島でブータレキャンプだコロン!)	July 14, 2008
Weekly Stage Location: Uninhabited island
20	"(Beauty and the Beach)"; Transliteration: "Kageppuchi no Tooruu, Dakoron" (Japanese: 崖っぷちのトールーだコロン!)	July 28, 2008
Weekly Stage Location: Kanagawa Prefecture, Enoshima Guest Star: Tohru Ooshiba as himself (Tony Oshiba)
21	"(The Way Cool School)"; Transliteration: "Harikiri Hotta Mahou no Takara, Dakoron" (Japanese: はりきりホッター魔法の宝だコロン!)	August 4, 2008
Weekly Stage Location: Ibaraki Prefecture, Tsukuba
22	"(Have No Fear, Yatterman is Here)"; Transliteration: "Gotouchi Hiiroo Dai Katsuyaku, Dakoron" (Japanese: ご当地ヒーロー大活躍だコロン!)	August 11, 2008
Weekly Stage Location: Kagawa Prefecture, Kompira Shrine
23	"(The Search for the Crystal Skull)"; Transliteration: "Kurisutaru Sukaru Hakken, Dakoron" (Japanese: クリスタルスカル発見だコロン!)	September 1, 2008
Weekly Stage Location: Tokyo, Asakusa
24	"(Hail to the Chief)"; Transliteration: "USA no Senkyo wa Dai-Sessen, Dakoron" (Japanese: USAの選挙は大接戦だコロン!)	September 8, 2008
Weekly Stage Location: Ōita Prefecture, Usa Guest Star: Manami Kurose as Teacher Kurose (Ms. Kurose) Notes: The plot of this episode parodies the 2008 Presidential Election, though with a more child-friendly design. Two of the candidates resemble kid versions of Barack Obama and Hillary Clinton.
25	"(20,000 Yatter-Leagues Under the Sea)"; Transliteration: "Yatta-Ankou Toujou, Dakoron" (Japanese: ヤッターアンコウ登場だコロン!)	November 10, 2008
Weekly Stage Location: Bottom of the Ocean. Guest Stars: Atsumu Watanabe as "Sekai no Nabeatsu" (Andrew Watanabe), Masayuki Miyazawa as Sakana-Kun (Sanford) Notes: First Appearance of Yatter Ankou.
25.5	"(Yatterman, the Movie Studio Fight)"; Transliteration: "Konya Kaigri no Doronbo tai Doronbo! Namase, Kenkoba, Fuka-Kyon ni, Ano Hiiroo mo Toujou Supesharu, Dakoron" (Japanese: 今夜限りのドロンボーVSドロンボー!生瀬·ケンコバ·深キョンにあのヒーローも登場スペシャルだコロン!)	November 24, 2008
Weekly Stage Location: Tokyo, Nikkatsu Movie Studio Guest Stars: Kyoko Fukada, Katsuhisa Namase, Kendo Kobayashi and Hiroshi Sasagawa as Themselves (Kelly Fukada, Keenan Namase, Kenneth "Ken" Kobayashi, and Hiro Sasagawa), Rikiya Koyama as Chuck Power (in a self-parody of his role as Jack Bauer's Japanese Dub, David Blaine). Director Takashi Miike also appears as himself but is voiced by someone else. (Terry Miike) Notes: Second one-hour special. This episode was created to tie in with the Yatterman live-action movie, and also plays a loose parody on the American television series 24. In this episode, the Dorombo Gang begin to use their own version of Mecha-Food, allowing them to create mini-robots to counter that of Yatterman's. Scenes from the first episode of the original 1977 series appear in this episode.
26	"(1, 2, 3 Yatter-Strikes, You're Out)"; Transliteration: "Rekidai San-Aku Oorusutaa Zei-Soroi, Dakoron" (Japanese: 歴代三悪オールスター勢揃いだコロン!)	December 1, 2008
Weekly Stage Location: Hyōgo Prefecture, Nishinomiya, Hyōgo, Koshien Stadium Guest Star: Kunihiro Matsumura as himself. (Kingsley Matsumura) Note: All the villains from the Time Bokan series: Marjo from Time Bokan, Donjuro from Zenderman, Atasha from Otasukeman, Alan Sukando from Yattodetaman, Kosuinen from Ippatsuman and Dasainen from Itadakiman made a guest appearance to assist the Dorombo Gang in building their weekly mecha.
27	"(Big Trouble in Grand Old Edo)"; Transliteration: "Kessen, Edo Harumi, Edo de Guu, Dakoron" (Japanese: 決戦エド·はるみ 江戸でグーだコロン!)	December 8, 2008
Weekly Stage Location: Edo, Kanda Shrine (Edo period) Guest Star: Harumi Edo as herself (Harris Edo) Note: Third Skull Ring Obtained.
28	"(Would You Like to Sing on a Star/A Yatter New Year)"; Transliteration: "Nenmatsu Supeharu Kouhaku Meka Gassen wa Dai-Konran, Dakoron" (Japanese: 年末SP紅白メカ合戦は大混乱だコロン!)	December 15, 2008
Weekly Stage Location: Tokyo, Shibuya Guest Stars: Sachiko Kobayashi, Yuki Nishio and Akira Kamiya as Themselves (Sandra Kobayashi, William Nishio, Arthur Kamiya). Kouichi Yamadera as himself and Impersonation of Kenichi Mikawa, (Kevin Yamadera).
29	"(A Skating We Will Go)"; Transliteration: "Figyua Sukeeto Jouou Kettei, Dakoron" (Japanese: フィギュアスケート女王決定だコロン!)	February 2, 2009
Weekly Stage Location: Ice Skating Championship Stadium
30	"(A Very Piggy Day)"; Transliteration: "Barentain wa Koujou Kengaku, Dakoron" (Japanese: バレンタインは工場見学だコロン!)	February 9, 2009
Weekly Stage Location: Kobuta's March Chocolate Factory Note: Fourth Skull Ring Obtained.
31	"(Ai-chan's rival)" Transliteration: "aichan ni koinoraibaru?, Dakoron" (Japanese: アイちゃんに恋のライバル?だコロン!)	February 16, 2009
Weekly Stage Location:Lake machu Hokkaido Notes:
32	"(Yatterman TV)"; Transliteration: "Jitsuroku!? Doronbo Micchaku Nijuu-yon Ji, Dakoron" (Japanese: 実録!?ドロンボー密着24時だコロン!)	February 23, 2009
Weekly Stage Location: Tokyo
33	"(There's No Business like Shogun Business)"; Transliteration: "Nandeyanen! Osaka ga Shuto? Dakoron" (Japanese: なんでやねん!大阪が首都?だコロン!)	March 2, 2009
Weekly Stage Location: Osaka, Osaka Castle (Siege of Osaka)
34	"(Hassle in the Castle)"; Transliteration: "Uso! Boyakki ga Intai? Dakoron" (Japanese: うそっ!ボヤッキーが引退?だコロン!)	March 9, 2009
Weekly Stage Location: Fukushima Prefecture, Aizuwakamatsu Guest Star: Mari Okamoto as Ohana
35	"(The Fifth Skull Ring Rumble)"; Transliteration: "Saraba Doronbo, Tsuini Kaisan, Dakoron" (Japanese: さらばドロンボーついに解散だコロン!)	March 16, 2009
Weekly Stage Location: Tokyo, Tokyo Bay Notes: Fifth Skull Ring Obtained, supposedly the last one. However, Dokurobee reveals that there are 5 more Skull Rings to be found. First Appearance of Dokubon, an all-new character who is Dokurobei's grandson. Last episode to broadcast at Monday evening.
36	"(New Mecha, New Adventure)"; Transliteration: "Kinkyuu Shutudou, Yatta-Jinbee, Dakoron" (Japanese: 緊急出動!ヤッタージンベエだコロン!)	April 5, 2009
Weekly Stage Location: Germany Notes: First appearance of Yatter-Jinbee, an all-new Mecha designed as a gigantic whale shark. Like the original Yatter-King and the original Yatter-Phant, it serves as a mecha-carrier. First Appearance of Neeton, Dokubon's horse-like pig. Dokubon establishes himself as a romantic interest for Ai-chan, spurning Gan-chan's own emotions.
37	"(Ain't Seen Nothing Yeti)"; Transliteration: "Dokubon no Himara ya Tanken, Da Koron" (Japanese: ドクボンのヒマラヤ探検だコロン!)	April 12, 2009
Weekly Stage Location: Himalayas Note: Sixth Skull Ring Obtained.
38	"(A Menace in Venice)"; Transliteration: "Aratanaru Teki Dokuroring Hanta, Da Koron" (Japanese: 新たなる敵ドクロリングハンターだコロン!)	April 12, 2009
Weekly Stage Location: Italy, Veneto, Venice Note: First Appearance of the Dokuro-Ring (Skull Ring) Hunters, a new enemy for Yatterman. They oppose both Yatterman and the Dorombo Gang.
39	"(Peril in Peru)/(Tomb with a View)"; Transliteration: "Doumo Mogura Desuga Nanika? Da Koron" (Japanese: どうもモグラですが何か?だコロン!)	April 26, 2009
Weekly Stage Location: Peru, Machu Picchu Note: First Appearance of Yatter-Mogura, a Talpidae-based Mecha created for the 2008 series.
40	"(One Small Step for Yatterman)"; Transliteration: "Uchuu Hikou wa Homushikku? Da Koron" (Japanese: 宇宙飛行士はホームシック?だコロン!)	May 3, 2009
Weekly Stage Location: Space Note: This episode features scenes from episode 35 of the original 1977 version.
41	"(Maui Owie!)"; Transliteration: "Dai 2 no Dokuhan! Hawai de Aroha, Da Koron" (Japanese: 第2のドクハン!ハワイでアロハだコロン!)	May 10, 2009
Weekly Stage Location: Hawaii Note: First Appearance of Chiruchiru Michiru Michitarinu, a Skull-Ring Hunter. However, unlike the other hunters, she wants to obtain them for her own research.
42	"(Supermarket Showdown)"; Transliteration: "Kyodai Suupaa De Gekiyasu Sensou!? Da Koron" (Japanese: 巨大スーパーで激安戦争!?だコロン!)	May 17, 2009
Weekly Stage Location: Supermarket "STOC"
43	"(To Win or Not to Win)"; Transliteration: "Undoukai de Sarukani Gassen, Da Koron" (Japanese: 運動会でサルカニ合戦だコロン!)	May 24, 2009
Weekly Stage Location: Neighborhood Sports day Stadium
44	"(Ninja Nightmare)"; Transliteration: "Ninja no Kazu wa Nannin ja!? Da Koron" (Japanese: 忍者の数は何人じゃ!?だコロン!)	May 31, 2009
Weekly Stage Location: Nagano Prefecture, Togakushi
45	"(The Big Apple Grapple)/(Hot Time at the Big Apple)"; Transliteration: "Shichinin no Haipa Resukyu, Da Koron" (Japanese: 7人のハイパーレスキューだコロン!)	June 7, 2009
Weekly Stage Location: New York, Brooklyn Ward
46	"(Getting Ready to Rumble)"; Transliteration: "Dai Sumou Doronbo Basho, Da Koron" (Japanese: 大相撲ドロンボー場所だコロン！)	June 14, 2009
Weekly Stage Location: Tokyo, Ryōgoku
47	"(In the Land Down Under)"; Transliteration: "Osutoraria de Pochittona, Da Koron" (Japanese: オーストラリアでポチっとなだコロン！)	June 21, 2009
Weekly Stage Location: Australia
48	Transliteration: "Yatta-Mecha Daizukan, Da Koron" (Japanese: ヤッターメカ大図鑑だコロン！)	June 28, 2009
Weekly Stage Location: Tokyo, Gan-chan's House Notes: This Episode is a Clip show. The only villains who appear in this episode are Boyakki and Neeton.
49	"The Milky Way which depends on the desert, Da Koron (A Little Tanabata Wish)"; Transliteration: "Sabaku ni Kakaru Amanogawa, Da Koron" (Japanese: 砂漠にかかる天の川だコロン！)	July 5, 2009
Weekly Stage Location: Morocco Notes: This Episode is a special Tanabata Episode.
50	"The Name also becomes Yatterdragon! Da Koron (Enter YatterDragon!)"; Transliteration: "So no na mo Yatterdragon nari! Da Koron" (Japanese: その名もヤッタードラゴンなり！だコロン！)	July 12, 2009
Weekly Stage Location: Legend World Notes: First Appearance of Yatter-Dragon.
51	"(By the Eclipse of the Sun)"; Transliteration: "Dokuhan! Kaiki Nisshoku de Mukimuki Dakoron" (Japanese: ドクハン！皆既日食でムキムキだコロン！)	July 19, 2009
Weekly Stage Location: Akuseku Island Notes: First Appearance of Muscle Gatten, one of the Skull-Ring Hunters. Seventh Skull Ring Obtained by the Skull-Ring Hunters.
52	"(Bull Fight)"; Transliteration: "Tougyuu Batoru wa Morettsu, Dakoron" (Japanese: 闘牛バトルはモォーレツだコロン！)	July 26, 2009
Weekly Stage Location: Spain, Barcelona
53	"(Pearls of Wisdom)"; Transliteration: "Mufuu ♥ Afuro no Megami, Dakoron" (Japanese: ムフッ♥アフロの女神だコロン！)	August 2, 2009
Weekly Stage Location: Mediterranean Sea, Cyprus. Note: Eighth Skull Ring Obtained.
54	"(Ghost of a Chance)"; Transliteration: "Hora! Ana no Himitsu, Dakoron" (Japanese: ホラ！穴の秘密だコロン！)	August 9, 2009
Weekly Stage Location: Aokigahara caves.
55	"(Here Comes the Bride)"; Transliteration: "Saikyou Dokuhan! Ai no Unseikyuu Joushou!? Dakoron" (Japanese: 最強ドクハン！アイの運勢急上昇！？だコロン！)	August 16, 2009
Weekly Stage Location: Strait of Dover. Note: First Appearance of Barbara, one of the Skull-Ring Hunters.
56	"(I've Been Fighting on the Railroad)"; Transliteration: "ShinDai Tokkyuu Orion Shuppatsu Shinkou, Dakoron" (Japanese: 寝台特急オリオン出発進行だコロン！)	August 23, 2009
Weekly Stage Location: Train Adventure Land Notes: This is the last episode where a fake Skull ring was found.
57	"(Rumble in the Jungle)"; Transliteration: "Mushigorou no Konchuu Oukoku, Dakoron" (Japanese: ムシゴロウの昆虫王国だコロン！)	September 6, 2009
Weekly Stage Location: South America, Amazon River Notes: Ninth Skull Ring Obtained. This is Also the last episode where Dorombo Gang gets punished.
58	"(For Whom the Final Ring Tolls)"; Transliteration: "Yatta-Mehca Zenmetsu, Dakoron" (Japanese: ヤッターメカ全滅！だコロン！)	September 13, 2009
Weekly Stage Location: Kagoshima, Kirshima Onsen-kyo Notes: Final Skull Ring Obtained. The only member from Skull Ring Hunters who Returned to battle Yatterman is Sein De Medachi. The Boss of the Dokuro-Ring Hunters are Revealed as Dokubon and Neeton themselves. As of Episode 59, Yatter-Dragon is destroyed. First Appearance of Yatter-King Since the 2009 Anime Movie, However Yatter-Kong and Yatter-KoKong are absent.
59	"(Love Live, YatterKing)"; Transliteration: "Dokurobee Fukkatsu, Dakoron" (Japanese: ドクロベエ復活だコロン！)	September 20, 2009
Weekly Stage Location: Kagoshima, Kirshima Onsen-kyo, Dokurobe's Hideout. Note: Dokurobei reveals himself.
60	"(The Final YatterBattle!)"; Transliteration: "Saraba Doronbo! Kondou Koso Kaisan, Dakoron" (Japanese: さらばドロンボー今度こそ解散だコロン！)	September 26, 2009
Weekly Stage Location: Dokurobe's Hideout. Notes: Final Episode. The original theme song of Yatterman from the 1977 version is used in place of the 2008 opening theme. Dokurobei, Dokubon and Neeton are revealed to be aliens. Unlike the original version, Dokurobei actually demonstrates powers with which to oppose Yatterman. Yatter-Dragon revived as Yatter-Dragon 2.0. Doronjo appears without her mask after the credits. Though Omochhama announces there to be new episodes, Neeton quickly denounces the claim. A scorecard appears at one point, accompanied by scenes from the 1977 series, to calculate all of the Dorombo Gang's activities between the original version and the remake: 1. Winning Against Yatterman: None; 2. Boyakki got hit by Doronjo: 474 times.; 3. Tonzura got hit by Doronjo: 116 times.; 4. Doronjo got Hollowed: 215 Times.; 5. Boyakki got Hollowed: 199 Times.; 6. Tonzura got Hollowed: 192 Times.
