= Yatterman Anime the Movie =

2009 Japanese anime film

- Theatrical release poster

Japanese name
- Kana: 劇場版 ヤッターマン 新ヤッターメカ大集合! オモチャの国で大決戦だコロン!
Transcriptions
- Revised Hepburn: Gekijō-ban Yattāman Shin Yattāmeka dai Shūgō! Omocha no kuni de Daisakusenda Koron!
- Directed by: Masakazu Hishida; Hiroshi Sasagawa (chief)
- Screenplay by: Natsuko Takahashi; Daisuke Watanabe; Masakazu Hishida
- Based on: Yatterman by Tatsunoko Production
- Produced by: Koji Nagai; Yoshikazu Tochihara
- Starring: Hiroyuki Yoshino; Shizuka Itō; Chiaki Takahashi; Kōichi Yamadera; Noriko Ohara; Jōji Yanami; Kazuya Tatekabe
- Narrated by: Koichi Yamadera
- Music by: Masaaki Jinbo; Masayuki Yamamoto; Hideyuki Fukasawa
- Production company: Tatsunoko Production
- Distributed by: Shochiku
- Release date: August 22, 2009 (Japan)
- Country: Japan
- Language: Japanese

Yatterman Anime the Movie (Japanese: 劇場版 ヤッターマン 新ヤッターメカ大集合! オモチャの国で大決戦だコロン!, Hepburn: Gekijō-ban Yattāman Shin Yattāmeka dai Shūgō! Omocha no kuni de Daisakusenda Koron!) is a 2009 Japanese anime film based on the television series Yatterman by Tatsunoko Production, serving as the sole feature film for the 2008 television series of the same name. Produced by Tatsunoko, the film was directed by Masakazu Hishida from a screenplay by Natsuko Takahashi, Daisuke Watanabe and Hishida and was released in Japanese theatres by Shochiku on August 22, 2009.

== Cast ==
Character	Voice actor
Gan-chan/Yatterman 1	Hiroyuki Yoshino
Ai-chan/Yatterman 2	Shizuka Itō
Omotchama	Chiaki Takahashi
Yatterwan	Koichi Yamadera
Yatterpelican	Koichi Yamadera
Yatterkong	Koichi Yamadera
Yattermogura	Koichi Yamadera
Yatterankou	Koichi Yamadera
Yatterdragon	Koichi Yamadera
Yattermogura	Koichi Yamadera
Yatterjinbee	Koichi Yamadera
Yatterkokong	Koichi Yamadera
Yatterking	Koichi Yamadera
Odate-buta	Koichi Yamadera
Narrator	Koichi Yamadera
Doronjo	Noriko Ohara
Dorukobei	Jôji Yanami
Tonzula	Kazuya Tatekabe
Dorukobei	Junpei Takiguchi
Prince Puramon	Miyuki Sawashiro
King Burikin	Kenichi Ogata
Minister Pazuru	Toshiyuki Morikawa
Tokubei Takada	Takayuki Sugo
Hitomi Takada	Ayaka Yamashita

== Production ==
The film was announced on May 9, 2009. The film has most of the staff from the 2008 series returning for the film. Comedian due Audrey were confirmed to be part of the guest cast on July 16th of that year.

== Music ==
The ending theme is titled "Smilife" performed by Stereopony. A rendition of "Yatterman no Uta" by Toshihiko Tamizawa is used during the opening credits while a rendition of "Yatterking" by Masayuki Yamamoto and Pink Piggies is used as an insert song. Tomoko Kawakami, who voiced Lip in 2000's Time Bokan 2000: Kaitou Kiramekiman appeared as part of the choir.
