= Yatterman (2008 TV series) =

2008 anime television series

- ヤッターマン
- Created by: Tatsunoko Production
- Based on: Yatterman
- Written by: Natsuko Takahashi
- Directed by: Hiroshi Sasagawa (chief); Akira Shigino (eps. 1-17); Masakazu Higisa (eps. 18-60)
- Voices of: Hiroyuki Yoshino; Shizuka Itō; Chiaki Takahashi; Koichi Yamadera; Noriko Ohara; Jôji Yanami; Kazuya Tatekabe; Junpei Takiguchi
- Narrated by: Koichi Yamadera
- Music by: Masaaki Jinbo; Masayuki Yamamoto; Hideyuki Fukasawa
- Country of origin: Japan
- Original language: Japanese
- No. of episodes: 60 (+ 2 specials) (list of episodes)

Production
- Producers: Koji Nagai (ytv); Yoshikazu Tochihara (Tatsunoko)
- Editor: Hiroshi Okuda
- Production companies: ytv; Tatsunoko Production

Original release
- Network: NNS (ytv, NTV)
- Release: January 14, 2008 – September 27, 2009

Related
- Yatterman Anime the Movie; Yatterman (1977 TV series)

Yatterman (Japanese: ヤッターマン, romanized: Yattāman) is a Japanese anime television series which serves as a remake to 1977's Yatterman and is the ninth television series in the Time Bokan franchise, commemorating the 30th anniversary of the Yatterman television series. Produced by Yomiuri TV and Tatsunoko Production, the series premiered on Yomiuri TV, Nippon Television and their affiliates on January 14, 2008, and ended on September 27, 2009.

== Characters ==
=== Heroes ===
Gan Takada (高田 ガン, Takada Gan) / Gan-chan (ガンちゃん) / Yatterman-1 (ヤッターマン1号, Yattāman Ichi-gō)
Voiced by: Hiroyuki Yoshino
Ai Kaminari (上成 愛, Kaminari Ai) / Ai-chan (アイちゃん) / Yatterman-2 (ヤッターマン2号, Yattāman Ni-gō)
Voiced by: Shizuka Itō
Omotchama (オモッチャマ, Omotchama)
Voiced by: Chiaki Takahashi

=== Villains ===
Doronjo (ドロンジョ, Doronjo)
Voiced by: Noriko Ohara
Boyacky (ブツクサ・ボヤッキー, Butsukusa Boyakkii)
Voiced by: Jōji Yanami
Tonzura (スタコラ・トンズラー, Sutakora)
Voiced by: Kazuya Tatekabe
Dokurobei (ドクロベエ, Dokurobē)
Voiced by: Junpei Takiguchi

== Production ==
The series was announced on October 10, 2007, alongside the announcement of a live-action film around the same time. Unlike the previous series, which aired on Fuji Television, the series would air on Yomiuri TV, Nippon Television and other NNS stations.

The show's cast was revealed via a press conference on December 12th of that year. The show marked the last time that Noriko Ohara, Jôji Yanami and Kazuya Tatekabe reprised their roles as their characters from the original 1977 show.

== Music ==
The show's theme song, Yatterman no Uta (ヤッターマンの歌) is performed by Otoya Kichiemon for episodes 1-10. For episodes 11-17, the song is performed by ET-KING. From episode 18-28, the song is performed by Yuki Nishio. From episodes 29-35, the song is performed by Fudanjuku and from episodes 36-59, the song is performed by Toshihiko Tamizawa. Episode 60 features the original audio from the original 1977 series.

The show uses six different ending themes for each episode. For episodes 1-10, the ending theme is titled Diverge by Mihimaru GT, for episodes 11-17, the ending theme is titled Kaiki Nisshoku (皆既日蝕) by JULEPS, for episodes 18-24, the ending theme is titled Rensoukyoku (恋想曲) by Manami Kurose, for episodes 25-28, the ending theme is titled Ima (今) by ET-KING, for episodes 29-35, the ending theme is titled Give Me Up by Nami Tamaki, for episodes 36-48, the ending theme is titled, Katsunda (勝つんだ!) by Fudanjuku, and the final ending theme is titled Zero kara hajimeru story (ZEROからはじめるストーリー) by Wakaba used until episode 60.

== Release ==
The series premiered on Yomiuri TV, Nippon Television and their affiliates on January 14, 2008, as part of the Anime 7 programming block, airing alongside Case Closed. As a result of the premiere of NTV's Surprise on April 6, 2009, the show moved to an early Sunday morning timeslot which would remain until its conclusion.

In North America, the series streamed on Anime Sols, a service and video distributor mainly backed by the Yomiuri Shimbun Group. However, Anime Sols was closed by May 1, 2015.
