= Yatterman (1977 TV series) =

Japanese anime television series

- タイムボカンシリーズ ヤッターマン
- Genre: Comedy, fantasy, science fiction
- Created by: Tatsunoko Production Planning Department
- Directed by: Hiroshi Sasagawa (chief, eps. 46–108); Seitaro Hara (chief, eps. 1–45)
- Music by: Masaaki Jinbo; Masayuki Yamamoto
- Country of origin: Japan
- Original language: Japanese
- No. of episodes: 108

Production
- Executive producers: Tatsuo Yoshida (eps. 1–36); Kenji Yoshida (eps. 37–108)
- Producers: Masaru Shibata; Masatsugu Nagai; Nagateru Kato; Minoru Uchima; Minoru Ono
- Production companies: Fuji Television; Tatsunoko Production

Original release
- Network: FNS (Fuji TV)
- Release: January 1, 1977 – January 27, 1979

Related
- Yatterman (2008 TV series); Yatterman (film)

Yatterman (Japanese: ヤッターマン, Hepburn: Yattāman) is a Japanese anime television series broadcast from January 1, 1977, to January 27, 1979, comprising 108 episodes. It is the second and longest show in the Time Bokan series by Tatsunoko Productions. The series succeeded Time Bokan and preceded Zenderman. It was also the final series to be produced by company founder Tatsuo Yoshida prior to his death.

A remake of Yatterman aired on NTV and Yomiuri TV from January 14, 2008, through September 27, 2009, with the original voice actors for the Doronbo gang. A live-action adaptation was released theatrically in March 2009. Another entry in the franchise, Yatterman Night, began airing in January 2015 to celebrate the 40th anniversary of the Time Bokan franchise.

== Plot ==
Fragments of a mysterious stone known as the Skull Stone (ドクロストーン, Dokurosutōn) are scattered across the globe. Once all four pieces are assembled, the location to the world's largest deposit of gold will be revealed. The villainous Doronbo (ドロンボー, Doronbō) gang are searching for the Skull Stone. Standing in their way are Gan and Ai, who become the masked heroes Yatterman-1 and Yatterman-2, respectively. The two are aided in their adventures by a large mechanical dog, Yatterwan.

Unlike previous series in the Time Bokan franchise, Yatterman does not cover any specific time/space travel. Instead, the places where the heroes travel to and the individuals they encounter are either a homage or parody. The fictional characters or places are usually represented by purposely misspelled names or familiar actions. For example, a revolution leader is named "Yashington", in homage to George Washington; and a place resembling ancient Japan is named "Yametai" ("(I) want to stop"), as a spoof of Yamatai.

== Characters ==
=== Heroes ===
Gan Takada (高田 ガン, Takada Gan) / Gan-chan (ガンちゃん) / Yatterman-1 (ヤッターマン1号, Yattāman Ichi-gō)
Voiced by: Yoshiko Ōta (1977–1979), Hiroyuki Yoshino (2008), Eri Kitamura (Tatsunoko vs. Capcom)
Actor portrayal: Sho Sakurai
Gan is a 13-year-old boy whose father is a famous toy designer who failed to complete the "Yatter-Wan", a dog-shaped all-terrain rescue robot. Gan is an expert mechanic, and he helps perfect his father's dream design. He forms a fighting team with his girlfriend, Ai, and names himself Yatterman-1. His weapon of choice is a kendama, which he uses as a flail and grappling hook, as well as for his special zapping attack "Kenda-Magic". He is shown to be much more careless in the 2008 version of the show and tends to frustrate Ai.
Ai Kaminari (上成 愛, Kaminari Ai) / Ai-chan (アイちゃん) / Yatterman-2 (ヤッターマン2号, Yattāman Ni-gō)
Voiced by: Mari Okamoto (1977–1979), Shizuka Itō (2008), Emiri Katō (Tatsunoko vs. Capcom)
Actor portrayal: Saki Fukuda
Ai is Gan's girlfriend, and the only daughter of a shopkeeper who sells electrical appliances. She is Gan's loyal follower, and is often seen constructing and modifying machines with him. She is Yatterman-2, and uses a telescoping baton called "Electric Stick" to shock opponents with electric currents. In the 2008 version of the show, she often refers to things as "100%" (for example, "We are in 100% of trouble").
Omotchama (オモッチャマ, Omotchama)
Voiced by: Reiko Katsura (1977–1979), Chiaki Takahashi (2008, live action film)
Omotchama is Gan's robot, and serves as the mascot of his father's toy shop. He is shaped like a large dice, and is known for his catchphrase "-da-koron" at the end of each sentence. His name comes from "omoccha", the Japanese word for "toy".

=== Villains ===
Doronjo (ドロンジョ, Doronjo)
Voiced by: Noriko Ohara
Actor portrayal: Kyoko Fukada
Doronjo (real name Hiroko Sasagawa (ササッガワ・ヒロッコ, Sasaggawa Hirokko)) is an attractive blonde who leads the Dorombo Gang in locating the Dokuro Stone. She is known for her vanity, intelligence, and leadership, just like her counterpart Marjo from Time Bokan. Doronjo also has an iconic skull-shaped smoking pipe similar to Marjo's.
Boyacky (ブツクサ・ボヤッキー, Butsukusa)
Voiced by: Jōji Yanami
Actor portrayal: Katsuhisa Namase
Boyacky is a tall, skinny man with a large nose and moustache, just like his counterpart Grocky in Time Bokan. He is clever, lecherous, and largely responsible for the creation of the giant mechas used by the Dorombo Gang. He usually appears naked, according to his comic Bogeboge Boyacky (ボゲボゲボヤッキー).
Tonzura (スタコラ・トンズラー, Sutakora)
Voiced by: Kazuya Tatekabe
Actor portrayal: Kendo Kobayashi
Tonzura is a short, muscular, squat man with a severe overbite and facial stubble, just like his counterpart Walsa in Time Bokan. Tonzura is the strong man of the group and does most of the heavy lifting, though he's usually quick to run away when threatened. He speaks with a kansai-ben accent.
Dokurobei (ドクロベエ, Dokurobē)
Voiced by: Junpei Takiguchi
Dokurobei is the elusive boss of the Dorombo Gang. He gives orders regarding the location of the Dokuro Stone to his subordinates in unusual ways, such as through a talking hamburger or the image of a red skull on a TV screen. Even when his leads are revealed to be inaccurate, Dokurobei is always quick to punish the Dorombo Gang for their failures.

=== Mechas ===
Yatter-Wan (ヤッターワン, Yattā-Wan)
Voiced by: Masaru Ikeda (1977–1979), Kōichi Yamadera (2008)
A dog-shaped mecha robot, Yatterwan was designed by Gan's father as a prototype rescue robot. He is fitted with a siren and a bell, similar to other rescue vehicles, plus a joystick to control his other features. Yatterwan can fire iron pellets from his nostrils and carries two fire hoses on his back. A bone-shaped power pack, known as "Mecha-Tonic", is fed to him to allow a sudden outburst of strength in warding off deadly blows. Yatterwan's special attack is a large group of miniature robots, which exit from his mouth, and usually take the shape of land-based animals. The mini-robots use their weapons on their enemies, causing Doronbo's robots to explode and create a skull-shaped cloud.
Yatter-King (ヤッターキング, Yattā-Kingu)
Voiced by: Masaru Ikeda
Yatter-King was built using the damaged remains of Yatterwan. It is a much larger machine, and resembles a crossover of a fire engine with a dachshund. It comes complete with a series of new features, including a tail that serves as a firehose, a projectile launcher on its rear, and a body which acts as a mecha-carrier for a series of smaller robots. In the 2008 version, it was formed by combining Yatterwan and Yatter-zero, which has a design with a more fighting ability and a "king"-like appearance.
Yatter-Pelican (ヤッターペリカン, Yattā-Perikan)
Voiced by: Masaru Ikeda (1977–1979), Kōichi Yamadera (2008)
Yatter-Pelican is a pelican robot who appeared in the 14th episode. He is constructed by Gan as an airborne mecha for the Yatterman duo. Yatter-Pelican has a braggard, loud-mouthed personality. He feeds on a fish-shaped Mecha-Tonic for a power boost, and the mini-robots he releases are shaped like various birds. In the 2008 version, he tends to speak in bits of English in certain sentences.
Yatter-Angler (ヤッターアンコウ, Yattā-Ankō)
Voiced by: Masaru Ikeda (1977–1979), Kōichi Yamadera (2008)
Yatter-Angler is a goosefish robot who appeared in the 27th episode. He is constructed as the only all-terrain mecha for the Yatterman duo, and is equipped with a cockpit for underwater travel. The Mecha-Tonic is in the shape of a fish roe, and releases mini-robots shaped like marine creatures. He has a funny, constantly-gurgling voice, as if one was talking underwater.
Yatter-Phant (ヤッターゾウ, Yattā-Zō)
Voiced by: Masaru Ikeda
Yatter-Phant is an elephant mecha, introduced in the 92nd episode as an alternate mecha-carrier alongside Yatter-King. Its most noticeable features are its ears, which flap in order to allow flight, and its trunk, which serves as a water-hose/flamethrower.
Yatter-Bull (ヤッターブル, Yattā-Buru)
Voiced by: Masaru Ikeda
Introduced in the 58th episode, Yatter-Bull is a bulldog robot, and serves as one of the three "Action Mechas" that are carried by Yatter-King.
Yatter-Dozilla (ヤッタードジラ, Yattā-Dojira)
Voiced by: Masaru Tanaka
Yatter-Dozilla is a dinosaur-shaped robot built by Gan, and has the ability to drill underground. His name is a reference to Godzilla.
Yatter-Panda (ヤッターパンダ, Yattā-Panda) & Little Panda (コパンダ, Ko-Panda)
Voiced by: Masaru Ikeda & Kumiko Takizawa
Yatter-Yokozuna (ヤッターよこづな, Yattā-Yokozuna)
Voiced by: Kenichi Ogata
Yatter-Yokozuna is a sumo robot.
Yatter-Jinbee (ヤッタージンベエ, Yattā-Jinbē)
Voiced by: Kouichi Yamadera
Introduced in episode 36 of the 2008 series, Yatter-Jinbee (Yatter-Whashark) is a whale shark mecha and mecha-carrier, much like the original Yatter-King and Yatter-Phant.
Yatter-Mogura (ヤッターもぐら, Yattā-Mogura)
Voiced by: Kouichi Yamadera
Yatter-Mogura (Yatter-Mole) is a new Talpidae-based mecha in the 2008 version, first appearing in episode 39. Like Yatter-Dozilla, he specializes in underground work.
Yatter-Dragon (ヤッタードラゴン, Yattā-Doragon)
Voiced by: Kouichi Yamadera
Yatter-Dragon is an Asian dragon-based mecha, introduced in episode 50 of the 2008 version. It only seems to appear in a major crisis, often when the other robots aren't available or functional.

=== Villains' machines ===
The shape and function of their mechas is fully dependent on the theme of the scam they are running at the beginning of each episode. Their machines usually feature a familiar interior, with Boyacky and Tonzura sitting at the sides, and Doronjo sitting in the middle, bossing them. The villains' machines are often seen packing a lot of weaponry and usually temporarily defeat Yatterman mechas at the beginning of each fight. Later in the show, the villains start to deploy their own armies of miniature robots to counter those of Yatterman.

== Media ==
=== Anime ===
==== 1977 television series ====
The original series aired on Fuji TV between January 1, 1977, and January 27, 1979, running for 108 episodes. For episodes 1-58, the opening theme is "Theme of Yatterman" (ヤッターマンの歌, Yattāman no Uta) by Masayuki Yamamoto, whilst the ending theme is "Genius Doronbo" (天才ドロンボー, Tensai Doronbō) by Noriko Ohara, Jōji Yanami, and Kazuya Tatekabe. For episodes 59-108, the opening theme is "Yatterking" (ヤッターキング, Yattākingu) by Yamamoto, whilst the ending theme is "Dorobo's Shirake" (ドロンボーのシラーケッ, Doronbō no Shirāke) by Ohara, Yanami, and Tatekabe. The series also aired in Spain, Italy, and Poland. It also gained a cult following in Italy during the 1980s.

==== 2008 television series ====
Nearly 31 years following the previous series, a remake of the series, also titled Yatterman (ヤッターマン, Yattāman), aired on YTV between January 14, 2008, and September 27, 2009, running for 60 episodes. The story is a retelling of the original series, with more modern references to suit current tastes. The actors who played the Doronbo Gang and Dokurobei all reprise their voice roles for the series. The opening themes are variations of "Yatterman's Theme", sung by (in order), Saemon Onyakichi, ET-KING, Yuki Nishio, Nakano-Bujo Sisters, and Toshihiko Takamizawa, with the final episode using the original version by Yamamoto. The ending themes in order are "diverge" by mihimaru GT, "Total Eclipse" (皆既日蝕, Kaiki Shitsushoku) by Juleps, "Like Love Song" (恋想曲, Rensōkyoku) by Manami Kurose, "Now" (今, Ima) by ET-KING, "Give Me Up" by Nami Tamaki, "I Win!" (勝つんだ!, Katsunda!) by Nakano-Bujo Sisters, and "A Story That Starts From ZERO" (ZEROからはじめるストーリー, Zero Kara Hajimeru Sutōrī) by Wakaba. The series, along with the original show, was streamed in North America via Yomiura Group's Anime Sols video service, as of spring 2013, but due to an unsuccessful campaign to crowd-fund the series' DVD release, the series was removed from the site, with the possibility of a new crowd-funding opportunity in the future.

An anime film based on the 2008 television series was released in Japan on August 22, 2009. Titled Yatterman: Shin Yatter Mecha Daishūgō! Omocha no Kuni de Daikessen da Koron! (ヤッターマン 新ヤッターメカ大集合!オモチャの国で大決戦だコロン!; lit. 'Yatterman: All New YatterMechas Assembled! Great Decisive Battle in the Toy Kingdom!') and directed by Masakazu Hishida, the film opened at #10 with US$702,155 on 210 screens.

==== Yatterman Night ====
A 2015 television series, Yatterman Night, began airing in Japan on January 11, to celebrate the 40th anniversary of the Time Bokan franchise. The series takes place several years in the future and follows the descendants of the Doronbo Gang as they fight against the Yattermen, who have become corrupt. The series is licensed in North America by Funimation, who simulcasted the series as it aired.

=== Live-action film ===
Nikkatsu produced live-action film based on Yatterman. The film was directed by Takashi Miike, and character and mechanical designs were handled by Katsuya Terada, who worked on Blood: The Last Vampire and Cutie Honey. The film opened on March 7, 2009, and became Japan's top film at the box office in its first week. Video label Eureka released the film on DVD and Blu-ray in the United Kingdom on May 21, 2012. Discotek Media released the film in North America in 2013.

=== Doronjo (drama series) ===
A live action drama adaptation titled Doronjo would air on Wowow from October to December 2022. It focuses on the backstory of Dorokawa Nao, an up and coming boxer who would later become "Doronjo", as well as her relationship with another boxer, Hijirakawa Aika. The series is much more grounded to reality compared to the original series, as well as having a much more serious tone.

=== Video games ===
Several video games have been released based on the series. NEW Yatterman: Nandai Kandai Yajirobe (NEWヤッターマン 難題かんだいヤジロベエ) was released for Super Famicom on March 22, 1996. A mobile game was released in 2003, developed by Hudson Soft. Two Nintendo DS titles based on the 2008 series, Yatterman DS: Bikkuri Dokkiri Daisakusen da Koron (ヤッターマンDS ビックリドッキリ大作戦だコロン, Yatterman DS: The Great Thrilling Operation) and Yatterman DS2: Bikkuri Dokkiri Animal Daibōken (ヤッターマンDS2 ビックリドッキリアニマル大冒険, Yatterman DS2: The Great Thrilling Animal Adventure), were released in April and October 2008, respectively, followed by a Wii title, Yatterman Wii: Bikkuri Dokkiri Machine de Takeshi Race da Koron (ヤッターマンWii ビックリドッキリマシンで猛レースだコロン, Yatterman Wii: The Thrilling Takeshi Machine Race), released on December 11, 2008.

Yatterman-1 and Doronjo (assisted by Boyacky and Tonzura) appear as playable characters in the crossover fighting game, Tatsunoko vs. Capcom: Cross Generation of Heroes, released by Capcom for arcades and Wii in Japan in 2008. An updated version, Tatsunoko vs. Capcom: Ultimate All-Stars, released internationally in 2010, adds Yatterman-2 as a playable character. Doronjo, Boyacky, and Tonzura's voice actors reprise their respective roles, whilst Yatterman-1 and Yatterman-2 are voiced by Eri Kitamura and Emiri Katō, respectively.

=== Other appearances ===
Yatterman makes a cameo appearance in the third episode of Sket Dance.

Japanese pro wrestling fed Michinoku Pro is currently running a Yatterman tribute gimmick, with wrestlers Hercules Senga, Tsutomu Oosugi, and Misaki Ohata as "Yapper Man #1", "Yapper Man #2", and "Yapper Man #3". #1 and #2 have been Tohoku Tag Team Champions.

Dead or Alive 5 Last Round features character costumes for Phase-4, Kasumi, and Nyotengu, based on Yatterman-1, Yatterman-2, and Doronjo, respectively, appearing as part of the "Tatsunoko Mashup Set" downloadable content pack.

Ai Kaminari debuted as a Virtual YouTuber on October 19, 2018, with the character's visuals designed by Fly, who is known as the illustrator for the Kemono Friends manga, Kemono Friends: Welcome to Japari Park!. She was later joined by Boyacky.
