= Trick The Movie: Last Stage =

- DVD cover
- Directed by: Yukihiko Tsutsumi
- Written by: Mitsuharu Makita
- Produced by: Yumi Murakami; Mitsuharu Makita; Yoshihiro Sato
- Starring: Yukie Nakama; Hiroshi Abe; Katsuhisa Namase; Kiko Mizuhara
- Cinematography: Shigetomo Madarame
- Edited by: Tomoyuki Fujiwara
- Music by: Yo Tsuji
- Distributed by: Toho
- Release date: January 11, 2014 (Japan)
- Running time: 112 minutes
- Country: Japan
- Language: Japanese
- Box office: ¥0.91 billion (US$8.73 million)

Trick The Movie: Last Stage (Japanese: トリック劇場版 ラストステージ) is a 2014 Japanese film directed by Yukihiko Tsutsumi. It is the last installment of the TV series franchise Trick.

== Cast ==
- Yukie Nakama as Naoka Yamada
- Hiroshi Abe as Jiro Ueda
- Katsuhisa Namase as Kenzo Yabe
- Yōko Nogiwa as Satomi Yamada
- Masumi Okada as Yamada's father
- Nasubi as Akira Kanbe
- Noriyuki Higashiyama as Shinichi Kagami
- Kazuki Kitamura as Masashi Tanioka
- Kiko Mizuhara as Shaman

== Reception ==
By January 19, it had grossed ¥0.91 billion (US$8.73 million) at the Japanese box office.
