= Gunjō =

Gunjō can refer to:

- Gunjō (song), a song by Yoasobi
- Gunjō (manga), a manga by Ching Nakamura
