= Trick (2000 TV series) =

Japanese TV series

Trick comprises a comedic Japanese television drama and movie series (three seasons, four movies, and three feature-length TV specials), as well as associated comic books, novelizations and meta-fiction novels about a failed magician and an arrogant physicist who debunks fraudulent spiritualists. It stars Hiroshi Abe and Yukie Nakama and is shown on TV Asahi (digital TV channel 5). It was created by Japanese director Yukihiko Tsutsumi and produced by Toho.

== Synopsis ==
Although 23-year-old Naoko Yamada (Yukie Nakama) considers herself a beautiful and talented magician, she is continuously fired and constantly hounded by her landlady for the rent being late. Before firing her, her manager shows Yamada an ad for a physics professor, Jiro Ueda (Hiroshi Abe), a non-believer of all things magical, offering money to anyone who can prove to him that magic is real. Desperately needing the money, Naoko accepts the challenge, which is how she comes to meet Professor Ueda. Falling prey to her simple magic tricks, Ueda is impressed, and enlists the reluctant Naoko to help him uncover the tricks behind a local cult. Soon, they are debunking spiritualists. Eventually Ueda develops a reputation for solving supernatural cases, but his secret weapon is Yamada, who hates the work but needs the money.

== Chronology ==
The entire Trick series consists of three seasons, four feature films and three feature-length specials in total. The final installation, Trick The Movie: Last Stage, premiered in Japan on January 11, 2014, marking the end of the Trick series after 14 years. Presented in chronological order:

- Season 1 (2000)
- Season 2 (2002)
- Trick: The Movie (2002)
- Season 3 (2003)
- Trick Shinsaku Special (2005)
- Trick the Movie 2 (2006)
- Trick Shinsaku Special 2 (2010)
- Trick The Movie: Psychic Battle Royale (2010)
- Trick Shinsaku Special 3 (2014)
- Trick The Movie: Last Stage (2014)

== Seasons ==
=== Season 1 (2000) ===
Season one introduces the main characters, as well as a would-be suitor for Yamada (this plotline will be abandoned after season one). The overarching plot is that a true psychic killed Yamada's father, and that person may be Yamada herself. Fraudulent psychics include: Big Mother (cultist, clairvoyant), Miracle Mitsui (makes things disappear), Kurosaka Miyuki (the pantomime killer), Katsuragi Koushou (clairvoyant, health guru) and the residents of Kokumontou (a.k.a. Black Gate Island).

=== Season 2 (2002) ===
This season has a more established atmosphere. Ueda has published a book debunking psychic power and spiritual phenomena, and is enjoying some fame. The villains include: Suzuki Yoshiko (fortune teller, time traveller), Fukami Hiroaki (clairvoyant), and Tsukamoto Emi (voice of divine punishment).

=== Season 3 (2003) ===
The surrealism and characterizations become more firmly entrenched. This season is named TRICK ～Troisième partie～ on the DVDs. Villains include: Shibakawa Genjou (commanding voice powers), "Slit" Mikako (teleporter), and Akaike Hiroshi (claims to fix anything, including people). The introduction of Detective Yabe's new sidekick, a proud and arrogant Toudai graduate. The last half of the final episode of the 3rd Season, the love-hate and unspoken relationship between Yamada and Ueda may look like it has entered a new stage.

== Feature films ==
=== Trick: The Movie (2002) ===
In the movie, Yamada is convinced to pretend to be a god and dupe a village, but she has to prove the other fake gods are charlatans. Ueda works behind the scenes to make some of her miracles possible.

=== Trick the Movie 2 (2006) ===
Ueda employs Yamada to go a mysterious island in search of a girl (played by Maki Horikita) that disappeared 10 years ago. They discover the island is run by Kobako Sachiko, who can appear and disappear via boxes, among other strange powers. The owarai duo Utopia makes a cameo appearance.

=== Trick The Movie: Psychic Battle Royale (2010) ===
In a remote village, a battle royale is held between many spiritualists to find the successor for shaman Kamahaeri. Ueda is asked to go to the village to uncover any frauds within the participants. Yamada participates in the battle herself, hoping to win money and recognition. As the battle progresses, participants get murdered one by one by a fellow participant who claims to be a real spiritualist.

=== Trick the Movie: Last Stage (2014) ===
Filming began on July 5, 2013 in Kuching, Malaysia. The trade company employee Shinichi (Noriyuki Higashiyama) recommends to Yamada and Ueda to go to a beautiful place abroad. There, Naoko and Jiro meets tribal shaman (Kiko Mizuhara) and unravel her tricks.

== Feature-length specials ==
=== Trick Shinsaku Special (2005) ===
Ueda joins other professors to debunk a spiritualist, Midorikawa Shouko, who claims she knows when people will die. The professors die one by one. Introduction of Yabe's Otaku assistant, Akiba.

=== Trick Shinsaku Special 2 (2010) ===
Ueda is asked to investigate serial killings that are likely to happen again during a festival to take place in a small village in Okayama. The victims are individuals who have taken an oath under a local tradition but dumped by their partners afterwards. The festival is marked by the return to the village of a strange woman by the name of Higashizaki Ayano, who had left 20 years ago after the death of her husband and son.

=== Trick Shinsaku Special 3 (2014) ===
In a small mountain village, the Suijin family has controlled the village for a long time. After the death of the father, the three sisters from the Sujin family quarrel over the family inheritance and treasure. There, consecutive murders then take place in the village. The villagers believe that these murders can only be explained by a paranormal phenomenon.

== Related media ==
=== Books ===
There are a few tie-in novels, written from the characters' points of view. Many of these appear in the show, when Ueda proudly shows them off. Currently, they are only available in Japanese.

- Series One Novelization
  - Japan Technology University's Professor Ueda Jiro's "C'mon Strange Powers!" (日本科学技術大学教授上田次郎のどんと来い、超常現象 (単行本)), in which Ueda details his personal history and summarizes some episodes of the show from his point of view. ISBN 4054017622
    - "VIP Use" version of the book.
  - Super-genius Magician Yamada Naoko's "I See What You Did There!" (超天才マジシャン山田奈緒子の全部まるっとお見通しだ) Yamada's own egotistical presentation of events in the series. ISBN 4847015398
- Series Two Novelization
  - Japan Technology University's Professor Ueda Jiro's "Why Don't You Do Your Best?" (日本科学技術大学教授上田次郎のなぜベストを尽くさないのか) A continuation of Ueda's egotistical summary. ISBN 4054025285
  - Super-genius Magician Yamada Naoko's "Swiftly, strongly, and completely, I've seen through it all!" (超天才マジシャン山田奈緒子の全部すべて、まるっとスリっとゴリっとエブリシングお見通しだ!), in which Yamada's version of events continues. ISBN 4847016629
- Trick: The Novel (トリック THE NOVEL): an independent story set after the first series.

=== Comics ===
- Trick: The Comic (トリック ザ コミック)
- Trick 2: The Comic
  - Publisher: Kadokawa Shoten. Supervision: Yukihiko Tsutsumi. Original Author: Kōji Makita, Masato Hayashi. Panel Artist: Atsushi Nishikawa.

=== Other ===
Detective Yabe's lecture

- Detective Yabe (Katsuhisa Namase) Presents Trick Movie 2 to the Public, a Lecture (広報人矢部謙三 トリック 劇場版２公開記念講演会) A DVD to promote the movie, starring the Detective Yabe character. The cover resembles the meta-fiction novels.

== Chemistry ==
Often, the plots involve a MacGuffin, which pales in comparison to the lead characters themselves (to the point where many plot holes are never explained). The chemistry between them is often cited as a reason for the popularity of the series. In addition, both characters are by most standards unbalanced and crazy, and social outcasts in many respects (though Ueda does have some fame as an author and professor) and their differences with a crazy world, in a way, bond them together. A subtle hint of love is suggested every once in a while, but usually the two poke fun at each other in half-hearted hatred.

== Running gags and motifs ==
- Each series and movie starts with Yamada doing a cheesy magic act, complete with blown out speakers, to an all but empty crowd. She is always fired soon after, and walks home with people, somehow aware of her plight, laughing and pointing. She has only one fan, who jovially stalks her from afar.
- One of the running gags in the characters' love-hate relationship is that they are both sexually inadequate; Yamada has a flat chest, and Ueda's anatomy is too large, and each constantly reminds the other of their shameful physical and virginal state.
- Starting early on, Ueda calls Yamada "YOU" in English instead of politely using her name in Japanese.
- Another trademark of Ueda is his tendency to yell out in English, "Jump!" and either preternaturally disappear, or perhaps more humorously, not.
- In the third series, Ueda's utterance "Uooh!" becomes very comedic and pronounced. Usually he says it when something bad happens. Yamada picks up the habit.
- Ueda is a proud man, and puts on airs of being fearless. He often spouts, "どんと来い!" (donto koi) equivalent to "bring it on!" in English. However, Ueda, while a big man, constantly faints. Though at times he can be roused to action and becomes a fierce fighter. In the third series, his more brave moments are often preceded by the heavily accented English phrase, "Why don't you do your best?" Which is one of his book titles, as is donto koi.
- Ueda frequently hits his head when he walks through doors or houses with low ceilings. This is due to his extremely tall height.
- Ueda often starts his appearance in each episode by using a magic trick, which Yamada easily figures out. Yamada usually does a simple magic trick towards the middle of the episode, and laughs characteristically ("kyeahehehe!") after explaining how she did it.
- Ueda's car door breaks off at one point, and he carries it over his shoulder quite often. His car also follows him at some points the feature-length specials and movies. This is never explained. In fact many of the more mystical aspects (and of course the irony that the only people with supernatural abilities may be Yamada and her mother) of Ueda and Yamada are never explained or even noticed by the main characters.
- Yamada has to practice smiling. She has no friends, save Ueda. She laughs in an unnatural way (see above) and is sometimes smacked by others when she laughs at her own cleverness.
- On every installment (except the first season), When Yamada passing by the shopping district, a family always laugh at her.
- Yamada's landlady is constantly hounding her for money, and not easily tricked. She is assisted by a tenant from Bangladesh, who eventual marries the landlady and by the beginning of Series 3 has two children (one boy, one girl) with her.
- Yamada's mother, Satomi (played by Yōko Nogiwa), is constantly scheming to make money, and loves Ueda like a son, which infuriates Yamada.
- Yamada (and sometimes others) constantly misreads kanji and Ueda has to correct her.
- Yamada often hits and disables Ueda. Detective Yabe often punches his assistants for saying things that annoy him.
- When someone is struck, the camera often shakes.
- Detective Yabe's assistant changes from a dullard to a genius in the third series, who constantly spouts, "I graduated from Tokyo University!" The new assistant is smacked as much as the first. In special and the second movie, a third, Otaku assistant takes the role.
- Another constant gag concerns detective Yabe's hair, which is a wig. Many puns are made when someone says a word like that sounds like "hair" and Yabe grabs his toupee and shouts "It's natural!"
- Detective Yabe (Katsuhisa Namase) often accuses Yamada of the current crime, or sometimes is even legitimately seeking her for fraud she has done. Usually, she can escape incarceration with simple tricks.
- There are a multitude of musical cues. For instance, when someone realizes something, there is usually the sound of a tambourine.
- As the series and movies increase, special effects become more and more surreal. Lightbulbs above peoples heads, bugs with human faces, and Ueda stretching his limbs to fight like a cartoon character are but a few examples.

== Music ==
Songs by Chihiro Onitsuka have been used as the closing themes for all three seasons of the TV show and the first movie. The song Gekkō was used for Series 1 and the first movie, Ryūseigun for Series 2, and Watashi to Warutsu (Waltz) wo for Series 3. Chihiro herself appeared onscreen singing Gekkō during the closing credits of the final episode of Series 1.

== Video game ==
A visual novel video game based on the TV series called Trick DS-ban: Kakushi Kami no Sumu Yakata (TRICK DS版 〜隠し神の棲む館〜, lit.TRICK DS Version: Hall Where the Hidden God lives) was published by Konami for the Nintendo DS on May 13, 2010.

== Production notes ==
- During the filming of seasons one and two, the svelte Nakama, who plays Yamada, had to flatten her chest further with a straight-padded blouse under her clothes because she was not modestly endowed enough for the producers' liking. However, in season three, Nakama no longer wears the padding, leading to a new gag in which Ueda often comments that she has a more pronounced chest than before. Yamada replies that it is "high-level magic", to which Ueda snorts and says that it is more likely the result of surgical enhancements.
- In the second movie, Yamada crawls around creepily for one scene. She also walks creepily for one scene in the third movie. These are the references to Nakama Yukie starring as Sadako Yamamura in Ring Zero.
- Ueda's apartment has pictures of him everywhere. These are from Hiroshi Abe's days as a young teen model.
