= Yukie Nakama =

Japanese actress and singer (born 1979)

- 仲間 由紀恵
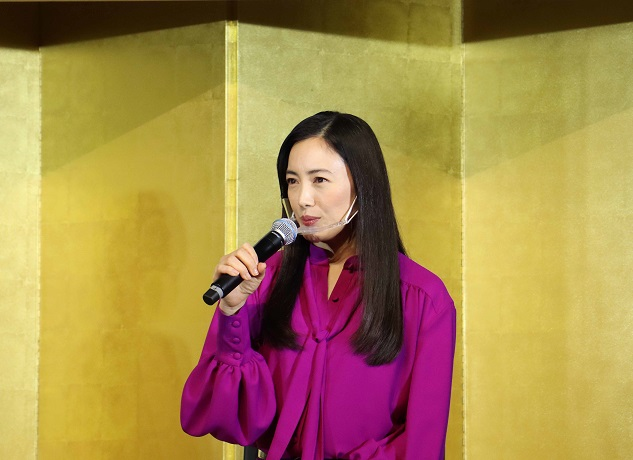
- Nakama in 2020
- Born: October 30, 1979 (age 46); Urasoe, Okinawa, Japan
- Occupations: Actress; singer
- Years active: 1994–present
- Spouse: Tetsushi Tanaka (m. 2014)
- Children: 2
- Website: www.ogipro.com/talent/nakama/

Yukie Nakama (仲間 由紀恵, Nakama Yukie; born October 30, 1979) is a Japanese actress, singer, and former idol.

== Biography ==
She was born in Urasoe, Okinawa, Japan, into an Okinawan family, the daughter of a fisherman and the youngest of five siblings.

At the start of her career she was a gravure idol and singer (her debut single "Moonlight to Daybreak" was released in 1996), and appeared in bit roles until her career breakthrough playing Sadako Yamamura in Ring 0: Birthday (2000).

In 2000, Nakama demonstrated her talent for comedy with her lead role in the Japanese television drama Trick which proved so popular that it had two more seasons and four film versions, but it was the top-rating 2002 TV series Gokusen, a live-action version of the popular manga, that established her as one of Japan's most popular and bankable actresses. Gokusen continued on for 3 seasons, which had many cameo appearances by actors who were on previous seasons. She is also known for her role in the drama, Saki, which Co-starred Shohei Miura.

Nakama has featured in commercials for companies such as Nissin Foods, Glico, Lotte, Asahi, Shiseido, au by KDDI, and has served as a spokesperson for Japan Railways and the Japanese Tax Agency. She is managed by Production Ogi.

== Personal life ==
Nakama married actor Tetsushi Tanaka on September 18, 2014, after a six-year relationship. Nakama gave birth to twin sons in June 2018.

== Filmography ==
=== TV series ===
- Mō gaman Dekinai (1996)
- Itazura na Kiss (1996)
- Tomoko no Baai (1996)
- Mokuyō no Kaidan 15 (1997)
- Dangerous Angel x Death Hunter (1997) (Episode 4 guest star)
- Shiawase Iro Shashinkan (1997)
- Odoru Daisōsasen Saimatsu Tokubetsu Keikai (1997)
- Kamisama mō Sukoshi dake (1998)
- Hashire Kōmuin! (1998)
- Kimi to Ita Mirai no Tame ni: I'll be Back (1999)
- P.S. Genki desu, Shunpei (1999)
- Aoi Tokugawa Sandai (2000)
- Nisennen no Koi / Love 2000 (2000)
- Trick (2000)
- Face: Mishiranu Koibito (2001)
- Ashita ga Arusa (2001)
- Uso Koi (2001)
- Trick 2 (2002)
- Gokusen (2002)
- Night Hospital Byōki wa Nemuranai (2002)
- Musashi (2003)
- Gokusen Special Sayonara 3-nen D-gumi ... Yankumi Namida no Sotsugyoshiki (2003)
- Kao (2003)
- Trick 3 (2003)
- Ranpo R (2004) (Episode 3 guest star)
- Tokyo Wankei (2004)
- Otouto (2004)
- Gokusen 2 (2005)
- Haru to Natsu (2005)
- Trick TV Special (2005)
- Kōmyō ga Tsuji (2006) as Yamauchi Chiyo
- Satomi Hakkenden (2006)
- Erai Tokoro ni Totsuide Shimatta! (2007)
- Himawari: Natsume Masako 27-nen no Shōgai to Haha no Ai (2007) as Masako Natsume
- Joshi Deka (2007)
- Gokusen 3 (2008)
- Arifureta Kiseki (2009)
- Mr. Brain (Episode 6 guest actress) (2009)
- Nene: Onna Taikōki (2009)
- Untouchable as Narumi Ryoko (TV Asahi, 2009)
- Japanese Americans (2010) as Hiramatsu (Matsusawa) Shinobu
- Utsukushii Rinjin (2011)
- Tempest (2011)
- Renai Neet: Wasureta Koi no Hajimekata (2012)
- Ghost Mama Sosasen (2012)
- Saki (2013)
- Island's Teacher (2013)
- Jinsei ga Tokimeku Katazuke no Mahou (2013)
- Hanako and Anne (2014)
- Beauty And The Fellow / Beauty And The Man (2015)
- Aibō: season 16 (2016)
- Rakuen (2017)
- School Counselor (2017)
- Ōoku the Final (2019)
- 24 Japan as Urara Asakura (2020)
- Aibō: season 19 (2020)
- Chimudondon (2022) as Yūko Higa
- Ōoku: The Inner Chambers (2023) as Harusada Hitotsubashi
- The Laughing Salesman (2025)
- When I was a Child Everything Was Fine (2025) as Anne Ogura
- The Scent of the Wind (2026) as Chikako Izumi

=== Films ===
- Tomoko no Baai (1996)
- Love & Pop (1998)
- Martian Successor Nadesico: The Motion Picture – Prince of Darkness (1998) voice:Lapis Lazuli
- Gamera 3: Revenge of Iris (1999)
- Ring 0: Birthday (2000)
- Oboreru Sakana (2001)
- Love Song (2001)
- Trick Movie (2002)
- Ashita ga Arusa, The Movie (2002)
- G@me (2003)
- Shinobi: Heart Under Blade (2005)
- Trick 2 (2006)
- Oh! Oku (2006)
- Watashi wa Kai ni Naritai (2008)
- Gokusen: The Movie (2009)
- Flowers (2010)
- Gekijoban Trick – Reinoryokusha Battle Royale (2010)
- Tempest 3D (2012)
- Trick The Movie: Last Stage (2014)
- Giovanni's Island (2014)
- The Big Bee (2015)
- Fullmetal Alchemist: The Final Alchemy (2022), Trisha Elric
- Step Out (2025)

=== Anime ===
- Haunted Junction, theme song performances "Kokoro ni watashi ga futari iru" & "Tremolo" (1997)
- The Prince of Darkness (Nadesico) (1998)

=== Video games ===
- Rockman X4, theme song performances, "Makenai Ai ga kitto aru" & "One More Chance" (1997)

=== Dubbing ===
- Jurassic World (2017 NTV edition), Claire Dearing (Bryce Dallas Howard)
- PAW Patrol: The Mighty Movie (2023), Victoria Vance

== Discography ==
=== Singles ===
- "Moonlight to Daybreak" (1996)
- "True Love Story (Koi no Yō ni Bokutachi wa)" (トゥルー・ラブストーリー〜恋のように僕たちは〜) (1996) True Love Story theme song
- "Kokoro ni Watashi ga Futari iru/Tremolo" (心に私がふたりいる / トレモロ) (1997)
- "Makenai Ai ga Kitto aru/One More Chance (負けない愛がきっとある/One More Chance) (1997) Mega Man X4 OP & ED and Don't Leave Me Alone, Daisy Ending Theme
- "Tōi Hi no Melody/Viola no Yume (遠い日のメロディー / ヴィオラの夢) (1997) Haunted Junction
- "Aoi Tori/Hareta Hi to Nichiyōbi no Asa wa" (青い鳥 / 晴れた日と日曜日の朝は) (1998)
- "Birthday/I Feel You" (2000) Ring 0: Birthday image song
- "Aishiteru" (愛してる) (2001)
- "Koi no Download" (恋のダウンロード) (2006) [as Yukie with Downloads]

=== Albums ===
- Tōi Hi no Melody (遠い日のメロディー) (1998)

== Awards ==
- Japanese Drama Academy Awards:
  - Spring 2002: Best Actress for Gokusen
  - Spring 2003: Best Actress for Kao
  - Fall 2003: Best Actress for Trick 3
  - Summer 2004: Best Dresser for Tokyo Wankei
  - Winter 2005: Best Actress for Gokusen 2
- Japan Academy Prize (film)
  - 2009: Nominated Outstanding Performance by an Actress in a Leading Role for Watashi wa Kai ni Naritai
- Elan d'or Awards
  - 2003: Newcomer of the Year
