= Kendo Kobayashi =

Japanese comedian and actor

- ケンドーコバヤシ
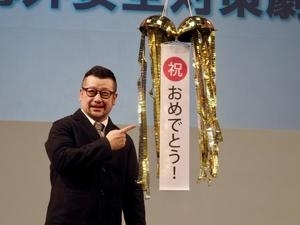
- Kobayashi at Tourism EXPO 2018
- Born: Tomoharu Kobayashi; 4 July 1972 (age 54); Higashisumiyoshi-ku, Osaka, Osaka Prefecture, Japan
- Other names: Ken Koba; Koba; Mr. Yaritai Hōdai
- Education: Hatsushiba Tondabayashi High School; Yoshimoto New Star Creation (NSC)
- Occupations: Comedian; actor
- Years active: 1992–
- Agent: Yoshimoto Creative Agency
- Known for: Niketsu!!; Ameagari no yamato Naze? Shiko; Ken Koba no BakoBako TV; NMB48 Sayaka Yamamoto no M-ane: Music Onēsan; High Noon TV Viking!; Yoshimoto Chō Gōkin K: Ken Koba Daiō Kangaeru Hito; Kangaeru Hito
- Height: 1.72 m (5 ft 8 in)
- Awards: 2nd and 3rd Dynamite Kansai (2000); All That's Manzai (2001); 11th Dynamite Kansai (2005); BGO Emi Kamagata Entertainment award (2005); BGO Emi Kamagata Entertainment Narrative award (2006); 14th Dynamite Kansai (2008); S-1 Battle Monthly Champion (2009)

Kendo Kobayashi (ケンドーコバヤシ, Kendō Kobayashi; born 4 July 1972) is a Japanese comedian and actor. His real and former stage name is Tomoharu Kobayashi (小林 友治, Kobayashi Tomoharu). He is nicknamed Ken Koba (ケンコバ), Koba (コバ), and Mr. Yaritai Hōdai (Mr.やりたい放題, Misutā Yaritai Hōdai). He is represented with Yoshimoto Creative Agency of Yoshimoto Kogyo in Tokyo. He graduated from the Yoshimoto New Star Creation (NSC) in Osaka.

Kobayashi graduated from Osaka Municipal Higashitanabe Elementary School, Osaka Municipal Nakano Junior High School, and Hatsushiba Tondabayashi High School. He served as a captain of the rugby club in high school.

== Filmography ==
=== Informal and variety series ===
Current appearances

| Year | Title | Network | Notes | Ref. |
|---|---|---|---|---|
| 2008 | Niketsu!! | YTV | | |
| 2012 | Mandō Kobayashi | Fuji TV One Two Next | Monthly broadcasts | |
| 2013 | Ken Koba no BakoBako TV | Sun TV | Kanmuri MC | |
| 2013 | NMB48 Sayaka Yamamoto no M-ane: Music Onēsan | Space Shower TV Plus | Monthly broadcasts | |
| 2015 | Fujiyama Fight Club | Fuji TV | | |
| 2016 | Ameagari no "A-san no hanashi": Jijō-tsū ni Kikimashita! | ABC | Panelist | |

Special programmes

| Year | Title | Network | Notes | Ref. |
|---|---|---|---|---|
| 2010 | CosCosPlayPlay | Fuji TV Two | Irregular appearances | |
| 2016 | The Geinin Cannon Ball Run | TBS | | |

Occasional appearances

| Year | Title | Network | Notes |
|---|---|---|---|
| | All-Star Thanksgiving | TBS | |
| 2008 | Akashiya TV | MBS | |
| | Matsumoto Hitoshi no Suberanai Hanashi | Fuji TV | |
| | Ima-chan no "Jitsu wa..." | ABC | |
| | Sōdatta no ka! Akira Ikegami no Manaberu News | TV Asahi | Quasi-regular appearances |
| 2009 | Geinōjin Kakuzuke Check | ABC | |
| | Wednesday Downtown | TBS | |

Former appearances

| Year | Title | Network | Notes | Ref. |
|---|---|---|---|---|
| 1999 | Chichin Puipui | MBS | | |
| 2001 | ?Majissuka! | MBS | | |
| 2001 | Kenzan! Aruchun | MBS | | |
| 2001 | Onedari Kaitō Go! Mouse | MBS | Occasional specials | |
| 2002 | Yoshimoto Chō Gōkin K: Ken Koba Daiō Kangaeru Hito | TVO | Uikanmuri MC | |
| 2003 | O-sa-m | MBS | | |
| 2003 | Nakagawa Ken! | MBS | | |
| 2006 | Shūkan Purachike! | KTV | | |
| 2006 | Fake Off: Kanzen naru Sōkan-zu | Fuji TV | As the voice of Kamisama | |
| 2006 | Obiraji R | TBS | Wednesday and Tuesday appearances | |
| 2007 | Shibuya Deep A | NHK-BS2, NHK-G | | |
| 2008 | Mezamashi Saturday | Fuji TV | Commentator | |
| 2009 | Campus Night Fuji | Fuji TV | MC | |
| 2009 | Jimoto ōen Variety: Kono hen!! Traveler | Tokyo MX | | |
| 2009 | Tsukutta Hito | Animax | MC | |
| 2010 | Made in Kansai | KTV | | |
| 2010 | Kuribitsu! | THK | | |
| 2010 | Docking48 | KTV | | |
| 2010 | Japan Loc Festival | Fuji TV | Tour guide | |
| 2011 | Motemote Ninety Nine | TBS | | |
| 2011 | Ameagari no yamato Naze? Shiko | ABC | | |
| 2012 | The Butchigiri TV | TBS | Golden MC | |
| 2014 | High Noon TV Viking! | Fuji TV | Wednesday, later Thursday appearances | |
| 2014 | "Sorette donna Hito?" Sōsa Variety: G-Men 99 | TBS | | |
| 2015 | Dōnaru? | MXTV | MC | |

Other appearances

| Year | Title | Network | Notes |
|---|---|---|---|
| | Un'nan no Rough na Kanji de. | TBS | |
| | Warau Koinu no Seikatsu Alive | Fuji TV | |
| | Hataraku ossan Gekijō | Fuji TV | |
| | Kangaeru Hitokoma | Fuji TV | |
| | BS Anime Yawa | NHK-BS2 | |
| | Marko Porori | KTV | |
| | Tokyo Mass Media Kaigi | Fuji TV | |
| | Mizunio Kingdom | MXTV, Sun | |
| | UnNan Kyokugen Neta Battle! The Iromonea: Warawa setara 100 man-en | TBS | Eliminated from "Iromonea", "Pinmonea", and the 4th "Gurumonea" |
| | Hey! Hey! Hey! Music Champ | Fuji TV | Regular corner appearance |
| | Akashiya Sanchannel | TBS | |
| | Orewan | Fuji TV | |
| | Arabiki Dan | TBS | As a member of "Zakoba" and "Zakoba with Beicho" |
| | Muchaburi! | TBS | |
| | Bakushō Red Carpet | Fuji TV | Appeared in "Nazo kake Kingu Kettei-sen" |
| 2011 | AKB to ×× | YTV | |
| 2011 | Ameagari Club | KTV | |

=== Documentaries ===
| Year | Title | Network | Notes |
|---|---|---|---|
| 2014 | Kendo Kobayashi no Italia-hito ni naritai | NTV | As a traveler |
| 2016 | Family History | NHK-G | |

=== TV drama ===
| Year | Title | Role | Network | Notes | Ref. |
|---|---|---|---|---|---|
| 2009 | Boss | Yoshiharu Iwai | Fuji TV | | |
| 2012 | Perfect Son | Toshiro Kabe | NTV | | |
| 2014 | Mitsuko Mori o Ikita Onna: Nihonichi Aisa reta Okāsan wa, Nihonichi Sabishī Onnadatta | Takeharu Yanagida | Fuji TV | | |
| 2014 | White Labo: Keishichō Tokubetsu Kagaku Sōsahan | Tsuyoshi Ishizawa | TBS | Episode 1 | |
| 2016 | Guard Center 24 | Hidemichi Sotokoba | NTV | | |

=== Anime television ===
| Year | Title | Role | Network | Notes | Ref. |
|---|---|---|---|---|---|
| 1997 | The Kindaichi Case Files | Policeman | YTV | | |
| 1999 | Detective Conan | Investigator A | YTV | | |
| 2008 | Kaden Manzai | John TV | TV Tokyo | | |
| 2008 | Michiko & Hatchin | Kiriru | Fuji TV | | |
| 2008 | Yatterman | Himself | YTV | Appeared in both anime and live action | |
| 2022 | Police in a Pod | Deputy Chief | AT-X | | |
| 2023 | Me & Roboco | Himself | TV Tokyo | Appears in episode 19 | |
| 2024 | Kinnikuman: Perfect Origin Arc | Wolfman | CBC, TBS | | |
| 2026 | Jujutsu Kaisen | Ken | JNN (MBS, TBS) | | |

=== Radio ===
Current appearances

| Year | Title | Network | Notes |
|---|---|---|---|
| 2012 | Tenga Presents Midnight World Cafe: Tenga Chaya | FM Osaka | |
| 2014 | Appare yatte māsu! | MBS Radio | Wednesday appearances |

Former appearances

| Year | Title | Network | Notes |
|---|---|---|---|
| 2001 | Kendo Kobayashi otona no Jikan | MBS Radio | |
| 2002 | B | MBS Radio | Monday appearances |
| 2002 | Suggoi! Otona no Jikan | MBS Radio | |
| 2002 | B Friday Special: Jinnai-Ken Koba 45 Radio | MBS Radio | |
| 2004 | Go Go Monkeys | MBS Radio | Thursday appearances |
| 2005 | Gocha maze! Suiyōbi | MBS Radio | |
| 2007 | Kendo Kobayashi no Kiminagu | TBS Radio | |
| 2008 | Mokuyō Junk Zero: Kendo Kobayashi no Temeoko | TBS Radio | |
| 2013 | Wanted!! | TBS Radio | Friday appearances |

Other appearances

| Title | Network | Notes |
|---|---|---|
| Yes Go! Go! Night! | Yes-FM | |
| Koba-Spo | ABC Radio | |
| Goo Goo Monkeys | MBS Radio | |
| Kobanna | MBS Radio | Special programme |
| FM Theater: Meisō Runner | NHK FM | |
| Kendo Kobayashi no Ultra Seoul | TBS Radio | Special programme |

=== Films ===
| Year | Title | Role | Notes | Ref. |
|---|---|---|---|---|
| 2005 | Break Through! | Karate Club captain Onishi | | |
| 2006 | Nichijō | Street musician Kamen Driver | | |
| 2007 | Nichijō: Koi no Koe | | | |
| 2008 | GS Wonderland | | | |
| 2009 | Yatterman | Tonzura | | |
| 2010 | No Laugh No Life | Keiji Banba | Co-starring with Daisuke Miyagawa | |
| 2012 | Ghostwriter Hotel | Kenji Miyazawa | | |
| 2013 | NMB48 geinin! The Movie: Owarai Seishun Girls! | | | |
| 2014 | NMB48 geinin! The Movie Returns: Sotsugyō! Owarai Seishun Girls!! Aratanaru Tabidachi | | | |
| 2015 | Kamen Rider × Kamen Rider Ghost & Drive: Super Movie War Genesis | Da Vinci Ganma/Renaissance Ganma | The Renaissance Ganma is used as a fusion between Da Vinci, Michelangelo and Raphael Ganmas. | |

=== Dubbing ===
| Year | Title | Role |
|---|---|---|
| 2007 | Hoodwinked! | Nicky |
| 2009 | Land of the Lost | Dr. Marshall |
| 2013 | Pacific Rim | Hannibal Chau |
| 2020 | Rambo: Last Blood | Victor Martinez |

=== Anime films ===
| Year | Title | Role | Ref. |
|---|---|---|---|
| 2010 | Doraemon: Nobita's Great Battle of the Mermaid King | Toragis commander | |
| 2012 | Berserk: The Golden Age Arc | Bazuso | |
| 2016 | Yu-Gi-Oh!: The Dark Side of Dimensions | Kudaraki | |
| 2016 | One Piece Film: Gold | Dice | |
| 2016 | Gantz: O | Hachiro Oka | |
| 2019 | Dragon Quest: Your Story | Sancho | |
| 2019 | Promare | Vinny | |

=== Advertisements ===
| Title | Notes |
|---|---|
| Mondelez Halls | Co-starring with Junior Chihara and Jichō Kachō |
| Coca-Cola Georgia Sizzle | |
| Kirin Brewery Smirnoff Ice Spice | |
| Momotarō Dentetsu | Co-starring with Azusa Yamamoto |
| Sapporo Brewery Ice Lager | As the voice of the polar bear |
| The Association for Promotion of Digital Broadcasting Power-Up! BS Campaign | As the voice of BS Man |
| Nissan "Kurabete Nissan" series | Narration |

=== Video games ===
| Year | Title | Role | Ref. |
|---|---|---|---|
| 2016 | Berserk and the Band of the Hawk | Bazuso | |
| 2016 | Yu-Gi-Oh! Duel Links | Kudaragi | |

=== Internet series ===
Current appearances'

| Year | Title | Website | Notes | Ref. |
|---|---|---|---|---|
| 2016 | Abema Prime | AbemaTV | Biweekly Tuesday appearances | |

Former appearances

| Title | Website | Notes |
|---|---|---|
| Tameike Now | GyaO | Irregular appearances |
| Ken Koba no Meiwaku Mail Magazine | Magalry | Wednesday broadcasts |

=== Newspaper serializations ===
| Title | Notes |
|---|---|
| Tokyo Sports, Osaka Sports, Chukyo Sports, Kyushu Sports, "Kendo Kobayashi no sōdatta no ka! Manaberu Geinin News" | Biweekly Thursday releases |

=== Magazine serializations ===
Title
Kajikaji "Ken Koba no Jinsei Lesson"
TV Bros. Kansai-ban
Monthly Yoshimoto "Column Ishu-sho Tōgi-sen-Matsuguchi vs. Kobayashi"
Ongaku to Hito "Ongaku to Majin"
Pia Kansai-ban "Tamashī no Rankingourmet"

=== Solo shows ===
| Year | Title |
|---|---|
| 2000 | Koba-chan no Gachigachi Saturday |
| 2001 | Koba-chan no Nukinuki Saturday |
| 2001 | Kobayashi nara Nani o yatte mo Yurusa reru no ka Series 1: Himitsu no Koba-chan |
| 2001 | Kobayashi nara Nani o yatte mo Yurusa reru no ka Series 6: Kobayashi Buss Komachi |
| 2002 | Kobayashi nara Nani o yatte mo Yurusa reru no ka Series 11: Kobayashi no Joe |
| 2002 | Kendo Kobayashi Midnight Live: Jojo no Kimyōna Kobayashi |
| 2002 | Kobayashi nara Nani o yatte mo Yurusa reru no ka Series 2: Koba Night |
| 2002 | Kobayashi demo Yurusa renē daro Series 1: Naiyō Gudaguda Tengoku |
| 2003 | Kobayashi nara Nani o yatte mo Yurusa reru no ka Series 13: Kobaben |
| 2003 | Mō Kobayashi o Aite ni sun na Series 1: Hazukashinagara Kaette mairimashita |
| 2003 | Kobayashi no Rampage Junction |
| 2003 | Kobayashi no Rampage Junction 2: Talk Live desu |
| 2004 | Iwai! Hatsu Live Hajimemashite! Ken Koba desu! |

== Bibliography ==
| Year | Title | Ref. |
|---|---|---|
| | Yatte yarutte!! | |
| | Ken Koba Densetsu: Boshi ni natta Kotoba-tachi | |
| | Kendo Kobayashi no tamaranai Mise | |
| | Kendo Kobayashi no Kansai tama Run Gourmet Book: Jōren ni naritai Gensen 226-ken Guide | |
| 2015 | "Bigaku" sae areba, Hito wa Tsuyoku nareru: Manga no Hero-tachi ga Boku ni Oshiete kureta koto | |

== Publications ==
| Year | Title |
|---|---|
| | Kinkyū Tokubetsu DVD: Tsuitō Kendo Kobayashi-san |
| 2003 | Dynamite Kansai: Zennihon Ōgiri-ō Kettei Tournament Taikai |
| 2006 | Dynamite Kansai 2006: Open Tournament Taikai |
| 2009 | Dynamite Kansai 2009: Open Tournament Taikai |
| | Battle Owaraiyaru |
Kinkyū Tokubetsu Bangumi Yōgi-sha Kendo Kobayashi Taiho: Jiken no Shinsō ni Semaru Kanzenhan
