= Ayaka Yamashita (voice actress) =

Japanese voice actress

- 山下 亜矢香
- Born: January 31; Amagasaki, Hyōgo Prefecture, Japan
- Occupation: Voice actress
- Years active: 2000–present
- Agent: Arts Vision

Ayaka Yamashita (山下 亜矢香, Yamashita Ayaka; born January 31) is a Japanese voice actress who is affiliated with Arts Vision. She was formerly a member of Aoni Production and Production Baobab.

== Personal life ==
Her hobbies involve dancing, playing the guitar, drawing still-life pictures and loves writing poems. She has an ability that she is very skilled with, and that is learning the Mandarin Chinese language.

== Voice roles ==
=== Anime television series ===
- Beyblade: V-Force – Boy B (Episode 3); Classmate I (Episode 2); Jim; Pupil B (Episode 5); Youth 1 (Episode 1)
- The Beast Player Erin – Panshe
- Love Get Chu – Bully A
- Naruto – Matsuri, Leaf Ninja Student (Episode 56)
- Queen's Blade – Woman Wrestler
- Sergeant Frog – Aunt
- Ultimate Muscle – Kaori (Episodes 13–14)

=== Anime films ===
- Yatterman – Hitomi Takada

=== Games ===
- Bouken Jidai Katsugeki Goemon – Goemon

== Dubbing roles ==
=== Television animation ===
- Franny's Feet – Johnny
- My Gym Partner's a Monkey – Adam Lyon
- Star Wars: The Clone Wars – Chalice

=== Live-action television ===
- Without a Trace – Additional Japanese dubbing voice

=== Live-action films ===
- Bring It On – Justin Shipman (Cody McMains)
- College Road Trip – Nancy Carter (Brenda Song)
- Lakeview Terrace – Marcus Turner (Jaishon Fisher)
- The Santa Clause 3: The Escape Clause – Additional Japanese dubbing voice
