= Bad Lands (2023 film) =

2023 film directed by Masato Harada

- Directed by: Masato Harada
- Written by: Masato Harada
- Based on: Keiso; 2015 novel by Hiroyuki Kurokawa
- Starring: Sakura Ando; Ryosuke Yamada; Katsuhisa Namase
- Cinematography: Nobuyasu Kita
- Edited by: Yûki Izumi; Soichi Satake
- Music by: Reiko Tsuchiya
- Production companies: Toei Company; Sony Pictures Entertainment Japan
- Distributed by: Netflix
- Release dates: 29 September 2023 (Japan); 29 December 2023 (Netflix)
- Running time: 144 minutes
- Country: Japan
- Language: Japanese

Bad Lands is a 2023 Japanese crime thriller film written and directed by Masato Harada, and starring Sakura Ando, Ryosuke Yamada and Katsuhisa Namase. The film debuted in Japanese theaters on 29 September 2023 and was released worldwide on Netflix on 29 December 2023.

== Cast ==
- Sakura Ando as Neri
- Ryosuke Yamada as Joe
- Ryudo Uzaki as Mandala
- Noriko Eguchi as Hino
- Katsuhisa Namase as Seiji Takashiro
- Yoshimi Tendo as Arai Mama

== Production ==
The films was announced by Toei Company and Sony Pictures Entertainment Japan. It is based on Hiroyuki Kurokawa’'s Keiso (2015). The filming took place in Osaka, Japan.

== Reception ==
Mrinal Rajaram of Cinema Express rated the film 3/5 stars. James Hadfield of The Japan Times rated the movie 4 out of 5 stars. James Marsh of South China Morning Post gave the film a rating of 3/5 stars.

=== Accolades ===
Date	Award	Category	Recipients	Result	Ref.
2023	36th Nikkan Sports Film Awards	Best Actress	Sakura Ando	Nominated	
2024	78th Mainichi Film Awards	Best Actress	Sakura Ando	Nominated	
2024	66th Blue Ribbon Awards	Best Actress	Sakura Ando	Nominated	
