= Tempest 3D =

- Directed by: Yoshiyuki Yoshimura
- Based on: The Tempest by Eiichi Ikegami
- Starring: Yukie Nakama; Shōsuke Tanihara; Takashi Tsukamoto
- Release date: January 28, 2012 (Japan)
- Running time: 149 minutes
- Country: Japan
- Language: Japanese

Tempest 3D (劇場版テンペスト３Ｄ, Gekijōban Tenpesuto 3D) is a 2012 Japanese drama film directed by Yoshiyuki Yoshimura. It is based on the 2008 novel The Tempest (テンペスト, Tenpesuto) by Eiichi Ikegami.

== Cast ==
- Yukie Nakama
- Shōsuke Tanihara
- Takashi Tsukamoto
- Gackt
