= Gunjō (manga) =

Japanese manga series

- First tankōbon volume cover

羣青
- Genre: Drama, yuri
- Manga
- Written by: Ching Nakamura
- Published by: Kodansha (former); Shogakukan (current)
- Imprint: Ikki Comix
- Magazine: Monthly Morning Two; (June 26, 2007 – June 22, 2009); Monthly Ikki; (February 25, 2010 – January 25, 2012)
- Original run: June 26, 2007 – January 25, 2012
- Volumes: 3
- Live-action film
- Ride or Die (2021)
- icon

Gunjō (Japanese: 羣青; lit. 'Ultramarine') is a Japanese manga series written and illustrated by Ching Nakamura. It was serialized in Kodansha's Monthly Morning Two from June 2007 to June 2009, before being canceled, and the manga continued its publication in Shogakukan's Monthly Ikki from February 2010 to January 2012. Shogakukan collected its chapters in three tankōbon volumes. A live-action film adaptation produced by Netflix, titled Ride or Die, premiered worldwide in April 2021.

== Plot ==
Gunjō is a crime story in which Les-san, a lesbian with happy and functional life decides to help her old school friend Megane-san, a woman in an abusive marriage. After Les-san kills Megane-san's husband, the two women are on the run.

== Characters ==
Megane-san (メガネさん) / Nanae Shinoda (篠田 七恵, Shinoda Nanae)
Portrayed by: Honami Sato
Les-san (レズさん, Rezu-san) / Rei Nagasawa (永澤 レイ, Nagasawa Rei)
Portrayed by: Kiko Mizuhara

== Media ==
=== Manga ===
Written and illustrated by Ching Nakamura, Gunjō debuted in Kodansha's seinen manga magazine Monthly Morning Two on June 26, 2007. The manga was canceled after 13 installments on June 22, 2009. Nakamura first planned to resume the manga as doujinshi; however, her plans changed after discussing with Shogakukan's Monthly Ikki's staff. The manga resumed publication in Monthly Ikki on February 25, 2010, and finished on January 25, 2012. Shogakukan collected its chapters in three tankōbon volumes, released from February 25, 2010, to May 30, 2012.

==== Volumes ====
No.	Japanese release date	Japanese ISBN
1	February 25, 2010	978-4-09-188509-8
2	January 28, 2011	978-4-09-188537-1
3	May 30, 2012	978-4-09-188577-7

=== Live-action film ===
In October 2020, it was announced that Netflix was developing a live-action film adaptation of the manga, titled Ride or Die (彼女, Kanojo; "Her"), which premiered simultaneously worldwide on April 15, 2021. The film stars Kiko Mizuhara and Honami Sato. The film was directed by Ryūichi Hiroki, Nami Sakkawa wrote the scripts and Haruomi Hosono performed the theme song.
