= Ride or Die (2021 film) =

2021 Japanese film

- Netflix poster
- Directed by: Ryuichi Hiroki
- Screenplay by: Nami Sakkawa
- Based on: Gunjō by Ching Nakamura
- Starring: Kiko Mizuhara; Honami Sato; Yoko Maki; Shunsuke Tanaka; Anne Suzuki; Shinya Niiro; Tetsushi Tanaka; Setsuko Karasuma
- Music by: Haruomi Hosono
- Distributed by: Netflix
- Release date: April 15, 2021
- Running time: 142 minutes
- Country: Japan
- Language: Japanese

Ride or Die (彼女, Kanojo) is a 2021 Japanese psychological thriller romance film written by Nami Sakkawa and directed by Ryuichi Hiroki, starring Kiko Mizuhara and Honami Sato. The film is based on Ching Nakamura's manga series Gunjō and was released by Netflix on April 15, 2021.

== Synopsis ==
Rei is a lesbian in her late 20s who abandons her longtime partner and career as a plastic surgeon upon learning that her former classmate and teenage crush Nanae is suffering brutal domestic violence from her husband. Rei kills him to show her love for Nanae. Nanae is filled with disgust and fear about the murder, but Rei accepts the results of her decision with the sole purpose of saving Nanae. While turning to each other for love, Rei and Nanae find themselves struggling with incompatible emotions.

== Cast ==
- Kiko Mizuhara as Rei Nagasawa
  - Sara Minami as young Rei
- Honami Sato as Nanae Shinoda
- Yōko Maki as Mika Oe
- Shunsuke Tanaka as Masato Nagasawa
- Anne Suzuki as Yu Nagasawa
- Shinya Niiro as Kotaro Shinoda
- Tetsushi Tanaka as Yoshio Akiba
- Setsuko Karasuma as Ichiko Oe

== Production ==
=== Development ===
In October 2020, it was announced that Netflix is developing a live-action film adaptation of the manga, under the title Ride or Die (Kanojo (彼女; "Her" or "Girlfriend") in Japanese) that will premiere worldwide simultaneously spring 2021.

== Reception ==
On the review aggregator website Rotten Tomatoes, 69% of 16 critics' reviews are positive, with an average rating of 6.80/10. Metacritic, which uses a weighted average, assigned the film a score of 64 out of 100, based on 5 critics, indicating "generally favorable" reviews.
