= Haunted Junction =

Japanese anime and manga series

- Cover of the first volume

HAUNTEDじゃんくしょん (Hōnteddo Jankushon)
- Genre: Comedy, Supernatural
- Manga
- Written by: Nemu Mukudori
- Published by: MediaWorks
- Magazine: Dengeki Comic Gao!
- Original run: 27 April 1996 – 27 August 2001
- Volumes: 13
- Anime television series
- Directed by: Yuji Mutoh
- Music by: Hayato Matsuo
- Studio: Bandai Visual; Studio Deen
- Licensed by: US: Bandai Entertainment
- Original network: TV Tokyo
- Original run: 2 April 1997 – 25 June 1997
- Episodes: 12

Haunted Junction (Japanese: HAUNTEDじゃんくしょん, Hepburn: Hōnteddo Jankushon) is a comedy anime and manga series created by Nemu Mukudori. The manga was serialized in the monthly manga magazine Dengeki Comic Gao! by MediaWorks from 1996 to 2001. The anime, produced by Bandai Visual and Studio Deen, aired between 2 April 1997 and 25 June 1997.

== Themes ==
This series explores some themes of folk religion such as possession, exorcism, shamanism, yurei, and yokai. In the final episode, some more existential themes are explored.

== Characters ==
=== Main cast ===
Haruto Houjou (北城遥都, Hōjō Haruto)

- Voiced by: Katsuaki Arima (anime), Yasunori Matsumoto (video game)

The son of a Christian minister and president of Saitō High School's Holy Student Council. He has curly blonde hair and as the series progresses, he grows it long and keeps it in a ponytail. Though he has no spiritual powers aside from seeing ghosts, Haruto is entrusted with the seven badges of the school spirits and summons them as necessary. He hates his job and dealing with ghosts, but his attempts to resign or transfer schools are constantly sabotaged by the Chairman. His dream is to spend one day attending classes, though his fellow student council members enjoy slacking off. With the exception of Episode 6, every episode ends with him saying "Oh my God!"

In the manga, while Haruto still thinks he doesn't really fit in the Council in his own words, he's noticeably more mature, reliable and level-headed than his anime incarnation, and gets along somewhat better with the spirits.

Kazumi Ryudo (龍堂和御, Ryūdō Kazumi)

- Voiced by: Shinnosuke Furumoto (anime), Toshihiko Seki (video game)

The son (grandson in the manga) of a Buddhist monk. His body is seen as ideal for ghosts and he is constantly possessed by the ghosts of people, animals, and demons; his friend and fellow Council member Mutsuki has to exorcise him several times a day. He is incredibly amorous of females, particularly the Toilet Hanako of the school and all the other Toilet Hanakos. In the manga, this obsession is a family trait shared by his grandfather Taro Ryudo, owner of the shrine where Kazumi lives.

Mutsuki Asahina (朝比奈睦月, Asahina Mutsuki)

- Voiced by: Yukie Nakama (anime), Rica Matsumoto (video game)

The tomboyish, strongwilled daughter of the proprietors of a Shinto shrine, and a miko (shrine priestess) in her own right. Redhaired, pretty, and rather curvy, she is a master of exorcism. She has an aggressive shotacon tendence, an attraction to young boys, and Nino is often a target of this. Although Mutsuki is not the main character or the de facto leader of the Holy Student Council, she is more confident than Haruto and frequently takes charge of situations. She can use her prayer stick as a weapon, and frequently expels spirits out of Kazumi using her "Asahina Special" exorcism attack.

Shingo Oumi (Manga-Only)

Shingo makes his first appearance in Volume 2 of the manga series during the introduction of the Blue Hanten, but he soon becomes a recurring main character as of Volume 3. Shingo is a much more easy-going, laid back, fellow of the group that usually lightens the mood with a more friendly style of teasing. While he does attend a different High School, he has become good friends with Haruto and the other members of the Holy student council through an adventure dealing with his younger brother and a Teke Teke imposter. As such, he is often found helping out and tagging along on all of the adventures and mysteries that follow soon after. Shingo uses Tarot cards to predict the future and uses a large knowledge of folklore and other background information to help the others.

=== School spirits ===
Nino (二ノ君, Nino-kun)

- Voiced by: Yuri Shiratori

A boy spirit found in a statue of Ninomiya Sontoku (a common statue seen at many Japanese schools). He is very intelligent and he (for example) takes rule books as comedy books. Mutsuki adores him and he is the frequent target of her shotacon antics. His badge color is yellow.

Red Mantle (赤マント仮面, Aka Manto Kamen)

- Voiced by: Ryōtarō Okiayu

A male spirit who wears a red cape and a white eye mask. His charms are said to be irresistible to women, though he has no power over Asahina because she prefers younger boys. His visual similarities to Sailor Moon's Tuxedo Kamen is made more explicit in an episode mid-way through the series when he is enlisted to distract a trio of ghosts calling themselves the Sailors XO and is even briefly depicted wearing a top hat, which he complains about (his voice actor, Ryōtarō Okiayu, himself appeared on two separate instances of Sailor Moon, one of which was as a main villain for the first half of SuperS). He also has a sister named Blue Hanten. He wears a mask over his eyes because his beauty is so overwhelming that everyone regardless of gender or preference falls in love with him, causing headaches and fevers as the effects wear off. His badge color is red.

Giant (踊る巨人, Odoru Kyōjin)

- Voiced by: Yutaka Shimaka

A male giant spirit, seen almost exclusively from the knees down. He is known as the "Dancing Giant" and is the "master" of the school's gym. He wears olive trousers and brown dress shoes. His badge color is purple.

Bones Suzuki (鈴木ジンコツ, Suzuki Jinkotsu) and Haruo Sato (佐藤はるお, Satō Haruo)

- Voiced by: Hisayoshi Izaki (Suzuki) and Yutaka Shimaka (Haruo)

These two spirits show up as a team, since they are the bones and the internal organs of an anatomical model of a human being. They are generally completely incompetent and make the situations they are summoned to help far worse. Their badge color is dark green, though in Episode 5, the duo state that the badge color is iridescent and can be seen as any color.

Mirror Girl (鏡子, Kagamiko)

- Voiced by: Mayumi Iizuka

A girl spirit of the mirror. She appears very rarely in the series, but is the quietest and most normal of the ghosts. Her badge color is orange. In the manga she has several mirror-related powers, using them to teleport people through different ones and showing others what's reflected in different glasses.

Toilet Hanako/Hanako Hasegawa (長谷川花子, Hasegawa Hanako)

- Voiced by: Mariko Kōda

A scantily-clad teenaged female spirit who dwells in a disused men's toilet in the high school. Toilet Hanako is one of the most popular school spirits having been voted No. 1 for 562 weeks on the spirit world's "School Spirits' Top Ten" voting program. Kazumi is obsessed with her. She once was the golden student of the school, not only beautiful but very athletic, smart and charismatic. Her badge color is pink. Her father, Hanasaku, was himself a popular school spirit as well.

The Chairman (理事長, Rijichō)

- Voiced by: Takeshi Aono

The chairman of the school, named Tatsugoro Saitō, is also a spirit, who can be summoned along with the others. He instructs the three members of the Holy Student Council to gather the badges for him, thus starting the series. He collects haunted artifacts from all over the world, thus continually increasing the number of ghosts that inhabit the halls. His badge color is dark blue.

Weeping Beethoven (ベートーベンの肖像画, Bētōben no Shōzōga) (Manga-only)

He's the ghost who takes care of the music room; he's a living portrait of Ludwig van Beethoven who weeps tears of blood. He seems to have a good share of knowledge about ghosts themselves, though not rivaling the Chairman's. In the manga, he's the one who has the dark green badge and not Suzuki and Sato.

== Video game ==
- Haunted Junction: Seitokai Batch o Oe!, a puzzle game developed by C.P. Brain and published by MediaWorks for the PlayStation, in 1997.
