= Utopia (comedy duo) =

Japanese comic duo

Utopia is the name of a veteran Japanese Owarai comedy duo. The members are nicknamed Hope and Peace as a result. They debuted in 1978 and grew famous with a skit about a teacher and student played by Hope and Peace respectively, where the teacher convinces the student to hold the end of a long rubber band in his mouth while the teacher pulls back and releases it slapstick-style. They are considered veterans in the industry; their recent appearance in the movie Trick 2 illustrates the cult-like following of their career and catch phrase: "Yoroshiku Ne!"

== Hope ==
Mitsuyoshi Jogo (born October 24, 1949, in Fukuoka, Japan) is the leader. He currently works as an actor in various television dramas, and as a tarento-style reporter on documentary and variety shows. He also writes a column in the Japanese magazine FLASH EX called よろしくね教ホープ教祖に聞け！連載/Yoroshiku ne Kyo.

== Peace ==
Shinichi Hoashi (born March 9, 1955, in Ōita Prefecture, Japan) also stars in various V-cinema dramas.
