= Junpei Takiguchi =

Japanese actor (1931–2011)

- 滝口 順平
- Born: Kōhei Takiguchi (滝口 幸平); April 17, 1931; Funabashi, Chiba, Japan
- Died: August 29, 2011 (aged 80); Tokyo, Japan
- Occupations: Actor; voice actor; narrator
- Years active: 1951–2011
- Known for: Burari Tochūgesha no Tabi as Narrator; Pittankokan Kan as Narrator; Yatterman as Dokurobei; Time Bokan as Perasuke; Mazinger Z as Count Brocken; Tekkaman: The Space Knight as Ranbos; Brave Raideen as Barao; Sonic the Hedgehog as Dr. Robotnik; Let's Go! Anpanman as Santa Claus; Lupin III as Mr. X D.Gray-man as Millennium Earl.hack//Roots as Phyllo

Kōhei Takiguchi (滝口 幸平, Takiguchi Kōhei; April 17, 1931 – August 29, 2011), better known by his stage name Junpei Takiguchi (滝口 順平, Takiguchi Jumpei), was a Japanese actor, voice actor and narrator from Chiba Prefecture.

Besides his narration roles in Burari Tochūgesha no Tabi and Pittankokan Kan and dubbing roles for various foreign films, he was also known for his anime voice acting roles in Time Bokan as Perasuke, Yatterman as Dokurobei, Mazinger Z as Count Brocken, Tekkaman: The Space Knight as Ranbos, Brave Raideen as Barao, Let's Go! Anpanman as Santa Claus, Lupin the Third Part 1 as Mr. X, Sonic the Hedgehog as Dr. Robotnik, D.Gray-man as Millennium Earl, and .hack//Roots as Phyllo.

== Biography ==
=== Early life ===
Takiguchi was born in Funabashi, Chiba on April 17, 1931.

During his childhood, his father did not have a steady job, as he tried various things only to fail repeatedly, with his family always having been driven into a miserable life at the very bottom of poverty. Deep down in his heart, a voice would keep crying out, "You must keep doing one thing steadily, no — you have to keep doing it..."

Because he had loved radio dramas ever since he was in middle school and as the relative of rakugo performer Kasugai Baiō, he thought he wanted to pursue either acting or rakugo.

After he had graduated from the mechanical engineering department of Chiba Prefectural Ichikawa Technical High School in 1949, Takiguchi worked at a local factory, but then entered and passed the amateur talent show Nodojiman Shijin Engei Kai (now known as NHK Nodojiman) using the recitation skills he had practiced in the broadcasting club during high school.

After that, he would join the theater troupe Kirinza, led by Genki Koyama, and started to train to become a voice actor.

=== Career ===
Having decided that "the broadcasting industry is the future", he applied for the 1st-generation Radio Tokyo (currently known as TBS Holdings as a corporate entity, and TBS Radio & TBS Television as broadcasters) Drama Troupe, established after the war. Of about 3,000 applicants, he was selected and passed the audition, officially entering the entertainment world. At the time, he had the top grades, and Takiguchi, at 20 years old, was reportedly the youngest among the males.

In February 1957, wanting to "test my true worth as a voice actor in a broader world", Takiguchi left the troupe, and after affiliations with Kinugasa Productions, Group Rindo, the Tokyo Actor's Consumer's Cooperative Society, and Tokyo Actor Pro, he became a freelancer.

He appeared in numerous radio dramas, and later on worked on Japanese-language voice dubbing for various foreign television films, becoming a pioneer in post-recording dubbing.

=== Final years ===
Even approaching the age of 80, he appeared in television anime such as the remake of Yatterman and Let's Go! Anpanman, and frequently served as a narrator for variety shows using his Dokurobei-style voice, such as in the "Celebrity Shindoi Command" segment of Tsuyoshi Domoto's Shindoi.

=== Death ===
Takiguchi died from stomach cancer on August 29, 2011, at the age of 80.

In 2012, he posthumously received the Special Achievement Award at the 6th Seiyu Awards.

== Filmography ==
=== Television animation ===
- Courageous Cat and Minute Mouse (1960) – Narrator
- Moomin (1969) – Moran
- Himitsu no Akko-chan (1969) - Dark King
- Andersen Stories (1971) - Mole
- Lupin III (1971) – Mr. X
- Mazinger Z (1972) – Count Brocken
- New Moomin (1972) – Moran
- We Know You, Moonlight Mask-kun! (1972) – Satan's Claw
- Vicky the Viking (1974) – Snorre
- Tekkaman: The Space Knight (1975) – Rambos
- Time Bokan (1975) – Perasuke
- Dinosaur War Izenborg (1977) – Gorou Kamihara, Dinosaur Emperor Ururu (Tyrannosaurus), Almost Dinosaur
- Yatterman (1977) – Dokurobē
- Nobody's Boy: Remi (1977-1978) - Driscoll
- The Ultraman (1979) – Pig
- Ninja Hattori-kun (1981) – Jippou
- Minami no Niji no Lucy (1982) – Pettywell
- Tokimeki Tonight (1982-1983) – Tamasaburo Kamiya
- Dragon Ball (1986) – Fortuneteller Baba
- Dirty Pair (1987) – Masoho
- Metal Armor Dragonar (1987) – Major Hydelnecken
- Let's Go! Anpanman (1988) – Santa Claus
- Dragon Ball Z (1989) – Fortuneteller Baba, Grand Elder, Porunga
- Burn, Zantetsuken! (1994) – Chin Chin Chou
- Montana Jones (1994) – Professor Nitro
- Alice SOS (1998) – M-1
- One Piece (1999) – Admiral Nelson
- Trotting Hamtarō (2000) – Maggie's Grandfather
- UFO Baby (2000) – Professor Vincent
- Alcatraz Connection (2001) – Howan
- Cyborg 009: The Cyborg Soldier (2001) – Professor Kozumi
- Astro Boy (2003) – Mr. Darling
- Kaiketsu Zorori (2004) – Yokai Sensei
- Karin (2005) – narration
- .hack//Roots (2006) – Phyllo
- D.Gray-man (2006) – The Millennium Earl
- Kirarin Revolution (2006) – Mister Danchō
- Kurozuka (novel) (2008) – Man in Black
- Dragon Ball Kai (2009) – Grand Elder
- Brave Raideen – Barao
- Kochira Katsushika-ku Kameari Kōen-mae Hashutsujo – God
- Mahōjin Guru Guru – Monburan
- Urusei Yatsura – Red Mantle

=== Theatrical animation ===
- Puss 'n Boots Travels Around the World (1976) – Monsieur Gourmon

=== Original video animation (OVA) ===
- Sonic the Hedgehog (1996) – Dr. Robotnik
- Slayers Gorgeous (1998) – Gaizno

=== Video games ===
- Crash Team Racing (1999) – Nitros Oxide
- Dragon Ball Z: Budokai 3 (2005) – Grand Elder, Uranai Baba
- Dragon Ball Z Sparking! (2005) – Porunga
- Dragon Ball Z Sparking! Neo (2006) – Uranai Baba, Porunga
- Dragon Ball Z: Sparking! Meteo (2007) – Porunga
- Dragon Ball Z Infinite World (2008) – Porunga
- Kingdom Hearts Birth by Sleep (2010) – Happy

=== Live Action ===
- Jumborg Ace & Giant – Yak Wat Pho

== Dubbing ==
=== Live action ===
- Arizona Colt (1975 TBS Dub) (Gordo Watch)
- Batman (Fuji TV Dub) (The Joker) (Caesar Romero)
- Butch Cassidy and the Sundance Kid (1977 Fuji TV Dub) (Sheriff Bledsoe (Jeff Corey))
- Death of a Gunfighter (1974 Fuji TV Dub) (Lester Locke (Carroll O'Connor))
- Dr. Strangelove (1971 TV Asahi edition) (Soviet Ambassador Alexei de Sadeski (Peter Bull))
- Entrapment (2007 TV Tokyo edition) (Conrad Greene (Maury Chaykin))
- Fraggle Rock (Uncle Traveling Matt) (1985 NHK dub)
- Goldfinger (1978 NTV edition) (Auric Goldfinger (Gert Fröbe)) (Recorded on DVD alongside the NET Dub)
- Hercule Poirot (Peter Ustinov)
- I Love Lucy (Frederick 'Fred' Hobart Mertz)
- The Ipcress File (1971 TBS Dub) (Blue Jay) (Recorded on DVD)
- The Island (1988 TV Asahi Dub) (Dr. Windsor)
- Jingle All the Way (Fuji TV edition) (Officer Alexander Hummell (Robert Conrad))
- Lawrence of Arabia (2000 TV Tokyo edition) (General Archibald Murray (Donald Wolfit)) (Recorded on DVD and Blu-Ray)
- Lethal Weapon 4 (2001 Nippon TV edition) (Benny Chan)
- Live and Let Die (1981 and 1988 TBS Dubs) (Sheriff J.W. Pepper (Clifton James)) (Both Dubs are recorded on a DVD by King Records.)
- Loose Cannons (VHS Dub) (Harry Gutterman) (VHS Dub is not recorded on DVD)
- The Man from Hong Kong (Willard (Frank Thring))
- The Man with the Golden Gun (1982 TBS Dub) (Sheriff J.W. Pepper (Clifton James)) (Recorded on DVD by King Records)
- Mary Poppins (DVD edition) (Uncle Albert (Ed Wynn))
- Melody (1977 TV Asahi Dub) (Mister Perkins)
- The Muppet Show (Swedish Chef)
- Muppets Tonight (Don Rickles)
- My Big Fat Greek Life (Gus Portokalos)
- Runaway Bride (Walter Carpenter (Paul Dooley))
- Son of the Mask (Theatrical Release edition) (Doctor Arthur Neuman (Ben Stein))
- Spartacus (DVD edition) (Gracchus (Charles Laughton))
- Who Is Killing the Great Chefs of Europe? (Maximillian Vandeveer (Robert Morley))
- Star Wars: Episode II – Attack of the Clones (Dexter Jettster)
- The Wizard of Oz (DVD edition) (Professor Marvel, The Doorman, The Cabby, The Guard, the Wizard of Oz (Frank Morgan))

=== Animation ===
- Alice in Wonderland (TBS edition) (Tweedledum and Tweedledee)
- Darkwing Duck (Tuskernini)
- The Incredibles (Ollie Johnston)
- Lady and the Tramp (Trusty)
- The Road to El Dorado (Chief Tannabok)
- The Simpsons Movie (Abraham "Grandpa" Simpson)
- Snow White and the Seven Dwarfs (Happy)
- The Aristocats (Peppo the Italian Cat)
- Alice in Wonderland – Caterpillar
- The Brave Little Toaster (1993 NHK edition) – Kirby
- Huckleberry Hound – Huckleberry Hound
- Quick Draw McGraw – Quick Draw McGraw
- The Simpsons – Grampa Simpson
- Teenage Mutant Ninja Turtles (BS2 edition) – Krang

=== Other ===
- Splash Mountain (Brer Owl)
