= Kiko Mizuhara =

American-Japanese actress, singer and model (1990)

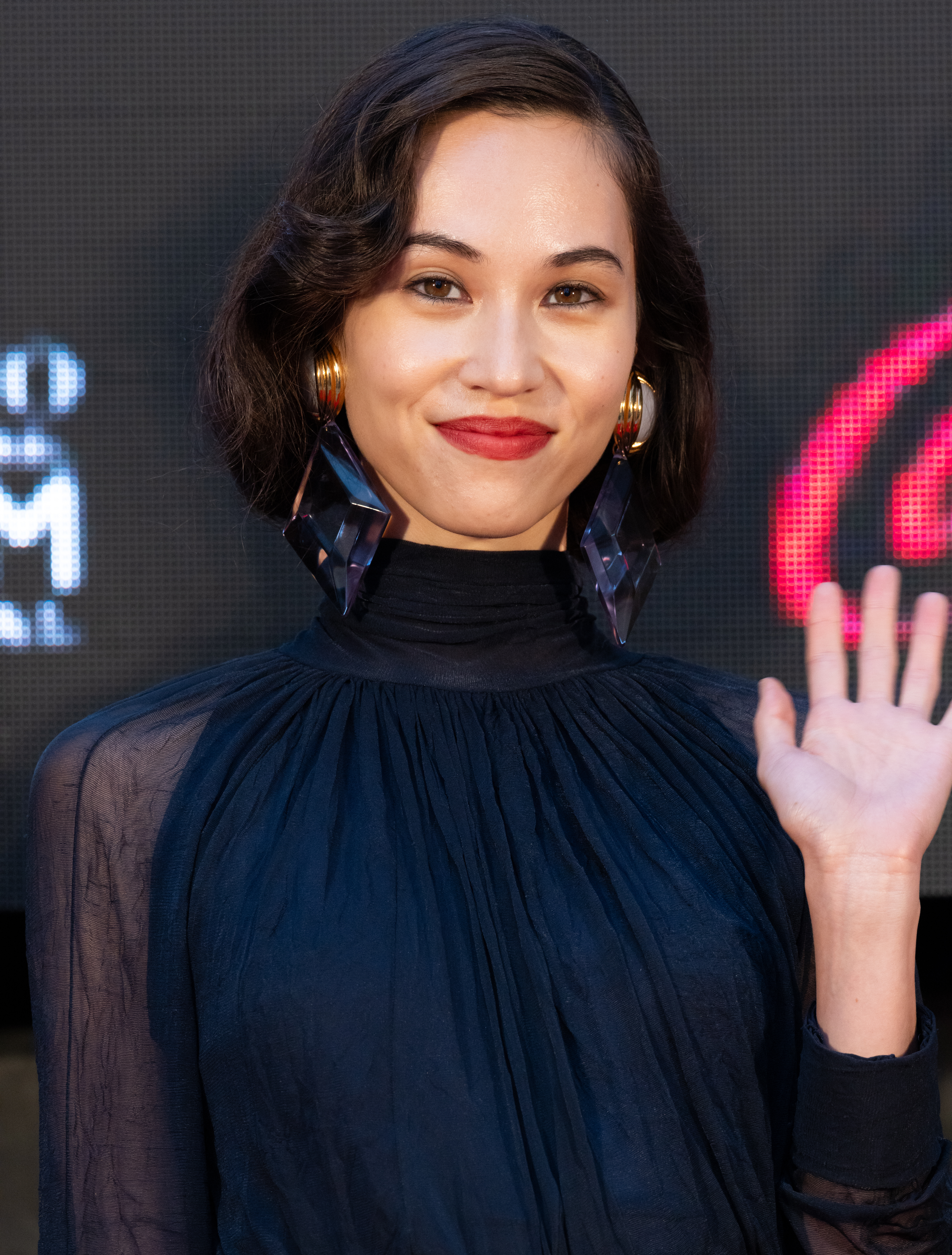
- Mizuhara at the 37th Tokyo International Film Festival in 2024
- Born: Audrie Kiko Daniel; October 15, 1990 (age 35); Dallas, Texas, U.S.
- Other names: Kiko Mizuhara; Noriko Daniel
- Occupations: Model; actress; singer; designer
- Years active: 2002–present
- Partner: John Carroll Kirby (2022–present)
- Parents: Todd Daniel (father); Yae Toyama (mother)
- Relatives: Yuka Mizuhara (sister)
- Modeling information
- Height: 1.68 m (5 ft 6 in)
- Hair color: Black
- Eye color: Brown

Audrie Kiko Daniel (born October 15, 1990), known professionally as Kiko Mizuhara (水原 希子, Mizuhara Kiko), is an American-born Japanese model, actress, singer and designer.

Kiko Mizuhara started her modeling career at the age of twelve when she entered an audition contest for Seventeen magazine in which readers selected their favorite new face for the publication. Later, she signed as a model under Vivi and Maquia magazines. Mizuhara made her acting debut in 2010 in Norwegian Wood and has appeared in many Japanese dramas and films. In 2011 and 2013, respectively, she was featured as a singer on Towa Tei's "The Burning Plain" and in M-Flo's "No Way". Mizuhara has collaborated with Opening Ceremony, and singers Rihanna and Beyoncé have worn her designs for the brand. In 2014, Mizuhara was listed among the Business of Fashion 500: The People Shaping the Global Fashion Industry.

== Early life ==
Mizuhara was born Audrie Kiko Daniel in Dallas, Texas, United States. She is the oldest of two daughters of Song Pal-choong (better known by her Japanese name Yae Toyama, née Mizuhara), a Zainichi Korean from Nagasaki, Japan, and Todd Mason Daniel, an American from Texas. She has a sister named Ashley Yuka Daniel, who is four years younger than her, and who also works in the modeling industry under the name Yuka Mizuhara. Mizuhara moved to Tokyo at age 2 and then to Kobe at age 3 with her family. When she was 13 years old, her parents divorced and her father moved back to the United States.

== Career ==
=== Modeling ===
In 2002, Mizuhara participated in a contest and won an audition for fashion magazine Seventeen. At the audition, she was picked as Miss Seventeen and became an exclusive model for Seventeen for the next three years. At age 16, she moved to Tokyo alone, living separately from her mother and sister in Kobe to advance her career in modeling. In July 2007, Kiko Mizuhara became an exclusive model for fashion magazine ViVi.

Starting 2008 Kiko Mizuhara has been a regular runway model at the Tokyo Girls Collection. Her international runway debut was at The Paris Collections in Olympia Le Tan's Spring/Summer 2014 Show. In the same year, Mizuhara was invited by British Fashion Designer Nasir Mazhar to walk for his S/S 2014 Collection at London Fashion Week and at Fashion Designer Jeremy Scott debut show for Moschino in Milan Fashion Week. Mizuhara was chosen to open and close the Fall/Winter 2014 Show of Sretsis, a Thai-brand clothing line, during the Mercedes-Benz Fashion Week in Tokyo. She has also participated in Nicola Formichetti's first full collection show for Diesel in Venice, Italy. In 2017, Kiko Mizuhara walked for Alexander Wang (designer) S/S 2018 Ready-to-Wear collection at New York Fashion Week.

Aside from her runway experiences, Mizuhara has graced numerous magazine covers and features not only in Japan but also in Asia and Europe. She has appeared in major Vogue editorials for Vogue Japan, Vogue China, Vogue Taiwan, Vogue Italia, American Vogue, Vogue Girl Japan and L'Uomo Vogue. She has done covers and spreads for Nylon, Numero, Vivi, Seventeen, Grazia, GQ, Elle, Harper's Bazaar, L'Officiel, Maquia Gisele, V Magazine, Another Magazine, Dazed and Confused, Cosmopolitan, Dedicate Magazine, and Jalouse Magazine. Mizuhara has also shot ad campaigns for Diesel, Phillip Lim, Vivienne Tam, Reebok, Kitsuné, Tiffany & Co., Shiseido, etc. She was appointed as a Chanel ambassador. In 2012, Mizuhara was photographed by Karl Lagerfeld for Chanel's The Little Black Jacket campaign. In December 2013, Mizuhara participated in the Chanel Metiers d'Art Show in Dallas, Texas.

Mizuhara starred in the Marc Jacobs Eyewear 2017 ad campaign. In 2018, she was appointed as the first Asian ambassador for Dior. She was also welcomed into the Coach family in the same year.

=== Acting ===
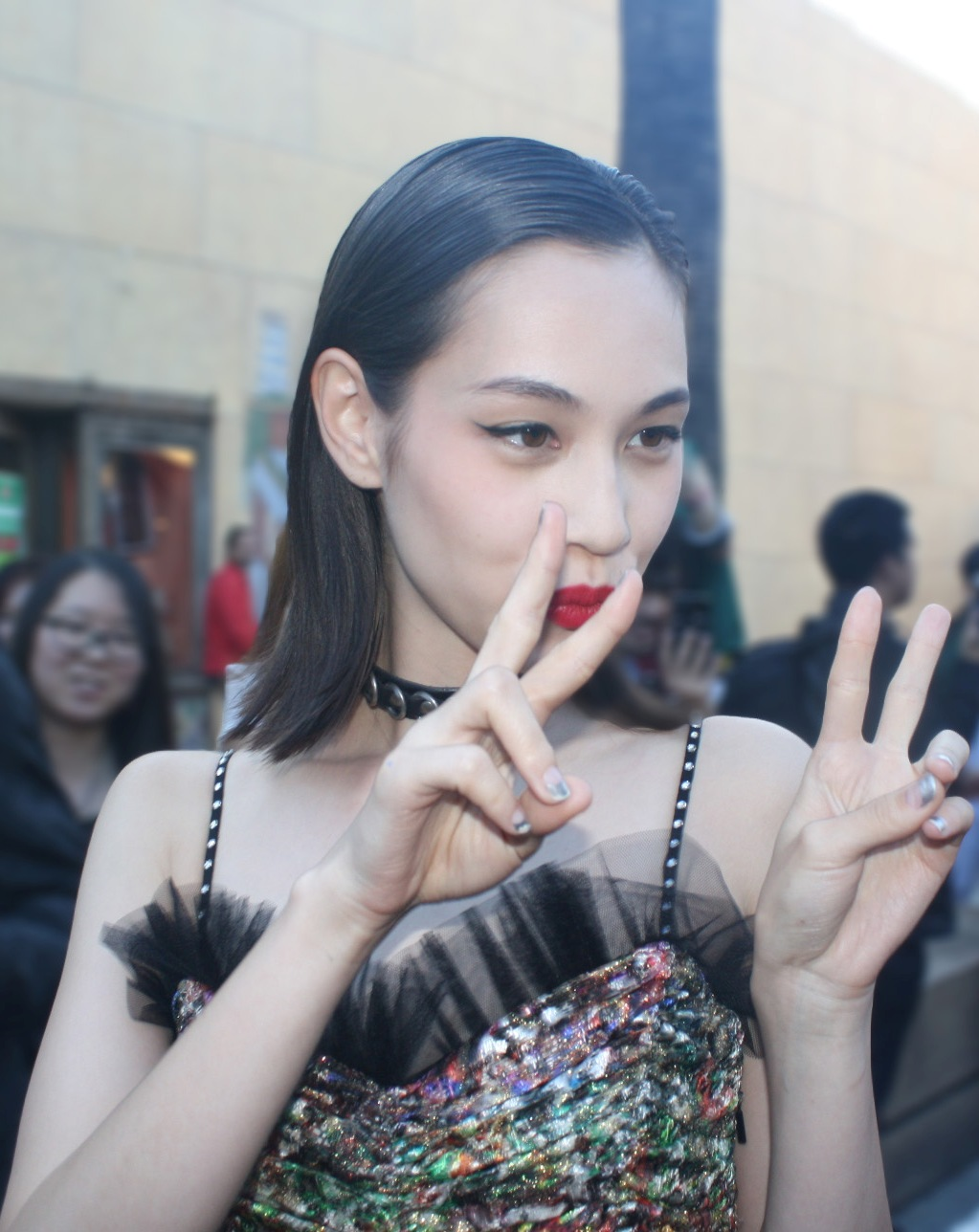
Mizuhara in 2015

Mizuhara co-starred in Tran Anh Hung's Norwegian Wood (2010) with Kenichi Matsuyama and Rinko Kikuchi. She played a supporting role in Mika Ninagawa's Helter Skelter (2012), which is based on the award-winning manga of the same name by Kyoko Okazaki. She has also played a supporting role in Toshiaki Toyoda's I'm Flash! (2012), and co-starred in Keishi Otomo's Platinum Data with Kazunari Ninomiya.

In 2013, Mizuhara has made her first small screen appearance in Japanese television series Yae no Sakura. In 2014, she starred in the drama Shitsuren Chocolatier and played as a witch doctor in Trick The Movie: Last Stage, filmed in Kuching, Malaysia, where she spoke Bahasa.

In 2015, she was part of the main cast of the Japanese drama Kokoro ga Pokitto ne (Crazy For Me) and portrayed Mikasa Ackerman in the live action adaptation of Attack on Titan. In 2021, Mizuhara co-starred in the film Aristocrats, adapted from the novel Ano Ko wa Kizoku by Mariko Yamauchi.

=== Designing ===
Mizuhara started her collaboration with Opening Ceremony during Spring 2013 in celebration of the Opening Ceremony flagship store in Japan. The collection was inspired by 1920s Paris creating a collection of très jolies blouses, lingerie, and frilled short-shorts. In the same year, she entitled her fashionwear collection "Bad Girl of the 90s", which included the famous pizza outfit worn by Beyoncé and other items she designed worn by Rihanna and other celebrities. Mizuhara has also produced a collection of headgear that blends Harajuku style with '90s streetwear in collaboration with Opening Ceremony Japan and Harlem-based label Gypsy Sport. In 2014, Mizuhara launched her Spring/Summer "Girlfriend of the Rockstar" collection and the 1980s-inspired "Disco Bowling" collection was released for Fall/Winter. For Opening Ceremony Japan, Mizuhara collaborated with photographer Nobuyoshi Araki and designer Yoshikasu Yamagata for the opening of the brand's first branch in Osaka, Japan.

Mizuhara teamed up with LA-based label UNIF in 2017 to launch a spring collection inspired by Mizuhara’s love of retro clothing, featuring a line-up of 90s pieces. Some items from this collection were worn by members of the K-pop group Blackpink in their music video for "As If It's Your Last". Other celebrities who have worn her items from this collection include Brown Eyed Girls members Ga-In and Sunmi.

In 2016, Mizuhara established Kiko Co., Ltd. (commonly referred to as “Office Kiko”). The following year, she launched her own designer brand called “OK”. In its first year of operation, “OK” already landed several high-profile collaborations, creating fashion, art, and lifestyle products. In 2018, Office Kiko announced a new line of boots and shoes in collaboration with the Esperanza, a Japanese footwear company catering to young women.

== Personal life ==
Mizuhara has been in a relationship with American musician John Carroll Kirby since 2022. She stated in an interview with NBC News that she has previously dated women, something that influenced her portrayal of Rei in Ride or Die. Describing herself, Mizuhara said: “I love fashion. I'm a cat lover, I also enjoy scuba diving and I love nature.”

== Filmography ==
=== Film ===
- Norwegian Wood (2010)
- Helter Skelter (2012)
- I'm Flash! (2012)
- Platina Data (2013)
- Trick The Movie: Last Stage (2014)
- Attack on Titan: End of the World (2015), Mikasa Ackerman
- The Kodai Family (2016), Shigeko Kōdai
- Nobunaga Concerto (2016), Oichi
- Tornado Girl (2017), Akari Amami
- The Blue Hearts (2017)
- Malu (2020)
- Aristocrats (2021), Miki
- Ride or Die (2021), Rei
- Adabana (2024)
- Undergirl (2026)
- Untitled Takashi Miike film (TBA)

=== Television ===
- Yae's Sakura (2013), Yamakawa Sutematsu
- Shitsuren Chocolatier (2014), Erena Katō
- Nobunaga Concerto (2014), Oichi
- Crazy for Me (2015)
- Kazoku no Katachi (2016), Haruka
- The Good Wife (2016)
- Uso no Sensou (2017)
- Queer Eye: We're in Japan! (2019)

=== Animation ===
- One Piece: Heart of Gold (2016), Naomi Drunk

== Discography ==
=== Guest appearances ===
- Towa Tei – "The Burning Plain" from Sunny (2011)
- M-Flo – "No Way" from Neven (2013)
- Mademoiselle Yulia - "Harajuku Wander" from Whatever Harajuku (2013)
- The Weeknd – "I Feel It Coming ft. Daft Punk" from Starboy (2016)
- The Internet - "La Di Da" from Hive Mind (2018)

== Awards and recognition ==
- 54th Fashion Editors Club of Japan Awards: Model of the Year
- 2012 Japan Fashion Leader Awards
- 2014 SOHU Fashion Awards: Asian Fashion Icon of the Year

== Bibliography ==
- Kiko (2010)
- Girl (2012)
- Kiko Mizuhara Model and Actress Fashionable Selby by Todd Selby, Abrams, New York, (2014)
- A Winter Diary by Julien Levy, New York, (2014)
