= Manami Kurose =

Japanese actress

- 黒瀬真奈美
- Born: December 25, 1991 (age 34); Japan Saitama Prefecture, Japan
- Years active: 2006–2010

Manami Kurose (黒瀬真奈美, Kurose Manami; born December 25, 1991) is a former actress and a singer in Japan.

== History ==
- In May 2005, Manami's mother found out about the Toho Cinderella Audition on Yahoo! website. On January 9, 2006, she attended the 6th Toho Cinderella Audition and she achieved the Grand Prix title out of 37,443 people. This audition was not only to become an actress but to debut first appearing in the film Rough. So in August of the same year, she debuted acting the film-only character.
- In August 2007, she participated in the GyaO audition which was held for the voice of Lyra in The Golden Compass However, she did not make it into the finals.
- Debuting as a singer on August 13, 2008, with single "Omoide Boshi/Waratte" (オモイデ星／笑って). "Waratte -digital version-" (笑って) was released only on iTunes from June 2008.
- The Japanese dub of The Mummy: Tomb of the Dragon Emperor uses her song "Memories" as its image song.

== Filmography and appearances ==
=== Movies ===
- Kakushi Toride no Sanakunin: The Last Princess (2008)
- Bizan (2007)
- Rough (2006)

=== Drama ===
- Hatachi no Koibito (2007)
- Hanazakari no Kimitachi e (2007)
- Taiyo To Umi No Kyoshitsu (2008)

=== Radio ===
- TOKYO FM 701ch "The Rooms" (2006–2007)

=== PV ===
- Negai Boshi by SHOWTA. (2006)

== Discography ==
=== Singles ===
- Omoide Boshi/Waratte (オモイデ星／笑って) (2008.08.13)
