= Katsuhisa Namase =

Japanese actor (born 1960)

- 生瀬 勝久
- Born: October 13, 1960 (age 66); Nishinomiya, Hyōgo, Japan
- Other name: Yarimakuri Sansuke (槍魔栗 三助)
- Occupations: Actor, tarento, host
- Years active: 1979–present
- Agent: Cube
- Spouse: Yoko Horimoto (m. 1997)
- Children: 1
- Website: www.cubeinc.co.jp/archives/artist/namasekatsuhisa

Katsuhisa Namase (生瀬 勝久, Namase Katsuhisa; born October 13, 1960 in Nishinomiya) is a Japanese actor, known primarily for his roles in television dramas. His roles are often positions of authority, such as managers, principals, or police officers, but many of these characters also share a certain kookiness and incompetence. Several of these characters wear wigs for comic effect.

== Early life ==
He graduated from the Doshisha University Department of Sociology, Faculty of Letters in 1986.

== Personal life ==
Namase married model and yoga instructor Yoko Horimoto in 1997 in Hawaii. The couple have one child, a son.

== Career ==
Namase joined the Theater Company Sotobakomachi in 1983. The first stage role he appeared in was "Sarutobi Sasuke". In 1986 he became the 4th chairman of Sotobakomachi. Around 2001, while working with the theatre company, which he soon departed, he started appearing in a series of late-night variety shows, including Yomiuri TV's "Weekly TV Kojien" gaining popularity, especially among university students. He had many regular TV and radio programs, and became an opinion leader among young people in the Kansai region.

He has also been active as a playwright and director.

== Filmography ==
=== Television dramas ===
- Jun-chan no Ōenka (1988-1989), Kiyohiko Koonji
- Shin-Buchō Keiji ~ Urban Police 24(1990), Detective Kotaro Kurata
- Hana no ran (1994), Kōzuki Sakon Shōgen
- Tokyo Cinderella Story (1994)
- Age 35 Koishikute(1996), Ikuya Ohira
- Shards of Glass (1996), Jin'ichi Mitobe
- Romance is Miracle (1996), Yamato Kusumi
- Koi no Vacances (1997), Taichi Onodera
- Itoshi no Mirai-chan episode 9 (1997), Sugawara
- Ore wa Naniwa no Manzai-shi. Okorude! Shikashi. (1997), Kiyoshi Nishikawa
- Mōri Motonari (1997), Inoue Harutada
- Amai Kekkon (1998), Daisuke Tachibana
- Sensei Shiranai no? (1998), Masaru Soneda
- Oatsui no ga Osuki? (1998), Yujiro Nonoyama
- Genroku Ryōran (1999), Okado Denpachiro
- Amai Seikatsu (1999), Eiichi Yazawa
- Trick (2000–14), Detective Kenzō Yabe
- Gokusen (2002–08), Vice Principal Gorō Sawatari
- Ryōmaden (2010), Yoshida Shōin
- Detective Kenzō Yabe (2010–13), Detective Kenzō Yabe
- Legal High (2012–13), Choichiro Miki
- Your Turn to Kill (2019), Jun'ichirō Tamiya
- Ochoyan (2021), Makoto Nagasawa
- Kotaro Lives Alone (2021–23), Isamu Tamaru
- Hayabusa Fire Brigade (2023), Kensaku Yamahara
- Boogie Woogie (2023–24), Kenji Tanahashi
- The 19th Medical Chart (2025), Eikichi Kitano
- The Ghost Writer's Wife (2025–26), Heita Hanada
- Did Someone Happen to Mention Me? (2026)
- Hakone Ekiden: Our Story (2026)

=== Films ===
- Trick: The Movie (2002), Detective Kenzō Yabe
- Trick: The Movie 2 (2006), Detective Kenzō Yabe
- Trick: The Movie: Psychic Battle Royale (2010), Detective Kenzō Yabe
- Trick: The Movie: Last Stage (2014), Detective Kenzō Yabe
- The Confidence Man JP: The Movie (2019), Ho
- The Confidence Man JP: Episode of the Princess (2020), Ho
- Godai: The Wunderkind (2020), Godai Hidetaka
- Your Turn to Kill: The Movie (2021), Jun'ichirō Tamiya
- The Confidence Man JP: Episode of the Hero (2022), Ho
- The Water Flows to the Sea (2023), Naruse
- The Innocent Game (2023), Masaharu Kugimiya
- Bad Lands (2023), Seiji Takashiro
- Black Showman (2025), Daisuke Kogure
- Beethoven Fabrication (2025), Stephan von Breuning
- Angel Flight: The Movie (2026), Goro Kuramochi
- The Hikikomori Extraction (2026)

=== Video games ===
- Fatal Fury 2 (1992), Joe Higashi, Billy Kane, Laurence Blood
- Fatal Fury Special (1993), Joe Higashi, Billy Kane, Laurence Blood, Geese Howard
- The King of Fighters '94 (1994), Joe Higashi
- The King of Fighters '95 (1995), Billy Kane

=== Dubbing ===
- The Addams Family, Gomez Addams
- The Addams Family 2, Gomez Addams
