= Enji =

- Gender: Male

Origin
- Origin: Japanese
- Meaning: Different meanings depending on the kanji used

Enji (円次, 猿児, 円児 or エンジ) is a masculine Japanese given name. Notable people with the name include:

- Enji Ichikawa (1911 – 1975), Japanese actor
- Enji Kakimoto (柿本 円次; 1920-1944), Japanese aircraft pilot
- Enji Takamizawa (1870–1927), Japanese art collector
- Enji Tetsuta (鉄田 猿児), Japanese manga artist
- Enji Tōrei (東嶺 円慈; 1721 - 1792), Japanese Zen Buddhist monk, teacher, author, painter and calligrapher

== Fictional characters ==
- Enji Koma (古間 円児), a character from Tokyo Ghoul
- Enji Matsuda (松田 エンジ), a character from Kamen Rider Zero, though named Arsino Magia
- Enji Todoroki (轟 炎司), a character from My Hero Academia also known as Endeavor

== See also ==
- Enji (singer), Mongolian singer
- Enji (deity), name of the deity after which Thursday was called in Albanian
