= List of Tokyo Ghoul characters =

The following article is a list of characters from the manga series Tokyo Ghoul.

== Main characters ==
Ken Kaneki (金木 研, Kaneki Ken)
Voiced by: Natsuki Hanae (Japanese); Austin Tindle (English)
Played by: Masataka Kubota
The main protagonist of the story is an eighteen-year-old black haired university freshman that receives an organ transplant from Rize, who was trying to kill him before she was struck by a fallen I-beam and seemingly killed. After the operation Kaneki develops ghoul-like tendencies and characteristics, and his rationality begins to wane. As one that now doesn't belong to humans or ghouls he struggles to keep his ghoul identity secret, always fighting against his ghoul side while trying to continue to live like a normal human. He later works as a waiter for Anteiku under Yoshimura's guidance. After his fight with a CCG investigator named Amon he gains the name Eye Patch (眼帯) because of his mask's design and becomes somewhat famous after a ghoul saw him defeating the investigator. He loves to read and is normally quiet and reserved but can also be calculating when fighting. He has a bad trait of easily trusting strangers which sometimes puts him in life-threatening situations. After being kidnapped by the ghoul run organization known as Aogiri Tree, he is mercilessly tortured by a sadistic ghoul named Yakumo Ōmori (Yamori), and later develops traits similar to his torturer's. While being tortured he has hallucinations of Rize in which she mocks him about his mother, leading to him finally embracing his inner ghoul. In the manga at chapter 61, Kaneki's hair slowly changes color from black to white. In the anime, Tokyo ghoul, his hair changes instantly after eating Rize and accepting his ghoul side. He then goes on and eats his torturer, Yakumo Ōmori. His view on strength changes and he goes on a power hungry path by cannibalizing other ghouls in order to get stronger. The continued cannibalization led him to become a half kakuja, where he develops a centipede shaped kagune and gains the alias Centipede (百足). After the incident at Kanō's Lab, Kaneki begins to regret this path and begins reflecting on his actions and motives. After being defeated and captured by Arima, Ken loses his memories and is given the new identity of Haise Sasaki (佐々木 琲世, Sasaki Haise), member and ace of the Mado Squad, and mentor of the Quinx Squad, a special unit composed of artificial ghouls. Despite having a new identity, Haise still retains some traits from his former self, like the love for reading and the determination to protect his companions with his life. When pressured to the limit, Haise has glimpses of his former self and unlocks his powers as a ghoul, forcing the CCG to strike him with RC suppressors to calm him down. Haise usually has an internal conflict with his past self, fearing that one day he would lose his current life with all his new friends and personality, which intensifies as he obtains more information about his former life until the raid at the Tsukiyama Headquarters, when he finally regains his memories and accepts his identity as Kaneki, not only showing a ruthless demeanor when facing his enemies, but a cold attitude toward his current and former allies as well. Haise's achievements allow him to quickly climb among the CCG's ranks, being promoted to First Class after the raid at the human auction and receiving a special promotion to Associate Special Class after single-handedly driving away the One-Eyed Owl during the raid at the Tsukiyama Headquarters, becoming known as the Black Reaper (黒の死神, Kuro no Shinigami), until he betrays the CCG to help Tōka rescue Hinami from the Cochlea, releasing the other ghouls imprisoned there in the occasion. After Kaneki defeats Arima, he claims for himself the title of One-Eyed King (隻眼の王, Sekigan no Ō), who according to Eto, has the potential to break the current status quo between ghouls and humans. For that purpose, he assembles the surviving members of Aogiri, the inmates from Cochlea rescued by him, several rogue CCG Investigators, and his old friends from Anteiku into a new organization called "Goat" which hopes to bring peace between humans and ghouls. After his fight with Juzo, he lost all his limbs and after all of his personalities argue about what to do, he consumes all the oggai squad (a new group of artificial ghouls made by Kano) and becomes a giant mass of kagune. He was later rescued by Tōka and the members of the Quinx squad. After regaining consciousness, he reunited with his best friend, Hideyoshi, whom he thought was dead.
Touka Kirishima (霧嶋 董香, Kirishima Touka)
Voiced by: Sora Amamiya (Japanese); Brina Palencia (English)
Played by: Fumika Shimizu; Maika Yamamoto
A seventeen-year-old ghoul of the 20th ward, Touka works part-time as a waitress in Anteiku and attends high school. She blends in well with human society and believes that keeping one's ghoul identity is of top most priority. She normally has a calm demeanor, but can be rash and somewhat aggressive, stemming from the fugitive life she had to live after CCG killed her father when she was very young. She is a powerful fighter who is more than a match for either Shū Tsukiyama or Nishiki Nishio on even grounds, though not nearly as strong as Renji. She becomes Kaneki's guide to the ghoul world as well as his training partner. She also takes up the role as Hinami's guardian after her parents are killed by investigators and is very protective of her. She later comes to be known as Rabbit (ラビット, Rabitto) after attacking some investigators as revenge for what happened to Hinami's mother, killing one of them in the process. Touka is also shown to be self-aware, as after she killed an investigator that was involved in the murder of Hinami's mother, she admits that a murderer such as herself deserved to die because killing for revenge is wrong. Despite her overall rash personality, she is a naturally kind girl who takes her job as a part of the Anteiku stability team very seriously. She also has a younger brother; Ayato, whom she raised before they both started to live in the 20th ward. Her brother would later join Aogiri Tree because he did not like the fact that she enjoys living among the humans. This is made very apparent after she starts attending high school and talks to him fondly about Yoriko. Later on, Touka has revealed to Yoshimura that she has an interest in biology, particularly where humans and ghouls are concerned, and expressed that she would want to be a teacher in the future. After the time-skip, she is seen running a new coffee shop called ":re" with Renji. Touka also appears to have matured some in that she is calmer and has a less aggressive demeanor than in her teenage years. She is fully aware of Kaneki's new identity, but is unwilling to force him to remember his past, although she admits that she is ready to support him should it happens and he decides to reunite with her, which he does once he defects from the CCG, mending their relationship and later becoming lovers. After consummating their relationship, it is later revealed that Touka is pregnant with their child and they got married. Like Yoma, her mother, Touka, can produce lighting from her Kagune though this was done accidentally in her fight with Special Class Kiyoko Aura and Mougan Tanakamaru during the Third Cochlea Raid.

== Supporting characters ==
Rize Kamishiro (神代 利世, Kamishiro Rize)
Voiced by: Kana Hanazawa (Japanese); Monica Rial (English)
Played by Yū Aoi
Rize was a girl with glasses that Ken encountered who tried to eat him after luring him out on a date with her. Parts of her body are transplanted into Ken after she is struck by fallen iron construction parts. Before the construction incident, Rize was a member of V, assigned to breed with the members of the Washū family, but escaped with Furuta's help. She was a very powerful, fearless and merciless ghoul, often preventing other ghouls from hunting in areas which she stole from them. She came to the 20th ward after wreaking havoc in the 11th ward, attracting the CCG Investigators to it. Before leaving, she killed the ghouls that were in charge and caused a shift in power. She is known as the "Binge Eater" by investigators and like Ken, she was very fond of reading. Originally believed to be killed during her encounter with Ken, it is later revealed that she is still alive and her body was used to produce materials for Ghoul/Human experiments by Dr. Kanō, with Ken's transformation into a ghoul being the result of one of them. She is later rescued by Yomo. However, she is captured by Nimura Furuta and subsequently merged with the Dragon. She is eventually killed by Kaneki in his attempt to put an end to the Dragon's rampage over Tokyo.
Shū Tsukiyama (月山 習, Tsukiyama Shū)
Voiced by: Mamoru Miyano (Japanese); J. Michael Tatum (English)
Played by: Shota Matsuda
A troublesome ghoul of the 20th ward with a well-known reputation: ghouls wouldn't even get involved with him. He is known as the "Gourmet" by investigators and is one of the most difficult ghouls to capture, especially because he hails from a powerful and rich family of ghouls with connections in the government. He is a part of the "Ghoul Restaurant" under the alias MM. He is a very powerful, cunning, smug, and fashionable ghoul and was also an acquaintance of Rize. Like both Ken and Rize, he is an avid reader. He sometimes says words or phrases in either English, Spanish, French or Italian, and develops an obsession for Ken because of his seemingly unique quality of being human and ghoul. He is very athletic and proficient in martial arts. After being a part of Kaneki's team post-Aogiri he considers himself Kaneki's best friend; at this point it was never clear if he had truly seen Kaneki as more than just food. After the time-skip, Shū gets devastated with Kaneki's disappearance until he is informed of his new identity as Haise and starts conspiring to have him remember his past, until his family's secret is exposed and his entire clan is put on the CCG's hit list. He is cornered by Kaneki, who apparently attacks him without mercy, but does not give him a fatal blow, allowing him to escape and be rescued by Chie, Yomo, and Tōka. He later helps out Naki and Miza Kusakari as they are being attacked by investigators.
Yoshimura (芳村)
Voiced by: Takayuki Sugō (Japanese); Sean Hennigan (English)
Played by: Kunio Murai
The manager of Anteiku, also known as the Non-Killing Owl. The name came from him pretending to be the One-Eyed Owl to cover up her behavior and refusing to kill Ghoul Investigators. He is a very kind and reasonable ghoul that provides aid and food to ghouls that are incapable of hunting on their own, such as Hinami. He takes Ken in after he becomes a half-ghoul and teaches him the ways in which ghouls can blend in with humans. He has shown to be able to reform ghouls from their violent ways, like helping both Koma and Kaya find peace among themselves when the two were leading large and hostile ghoul gangs against each other. He has also helped Yomo to let go of his hate and vengeful attitude towards ghoul investigators and is a father figure to Tōka. He has a mysterious past related to Aogiri and an elusive organization known as V. After Anteiku's secret is exposed and the place is raided by the CCG, he is captured by his daughter, Eto, and given to Kanō for his experiments. He used to go by the name Kuzen (功善).
Hinami Fueguchi (笛口 雛実, Fueguchi Hinami)
Voiced by: Sumire Morohoshi (Japanese); Lara Woodhull (English)
Played by: Hiyori Sakurada
Hinami is a 13 to 14-year-old ghoul that came to the 20th ward with her mother after her father was killed by ghoul investigators. She is very shy and quiet, yearning for knowledge as she isn't allowed to go to school. She meets Ken in Anteiku and becomes attached to him after he helps her with reading and the pronunciation of certain kanji characters. She begins living with Tōka after her mother is killed by Kureo Mado but later goes with Kaneki post Aogiri though she would still visit Tōka. This is changed in the anime as she does not go with Kaneki and stays with Tōka instead. She enjoys books from one of Ken's favorite authors, Sen Takatsuki (Eto Yoshimura) and loves learning new things. She is shown to have a heightened sense of smell, even more powerful than regular ghouls. In the sequel she reappears as part of Aogiri Tree known as Yotsume (ヨツメ, Yotsume), and once captured by the CCG, she is put under Haise's care by his request, which is a temporary situation, as Akira intends to have Hinami executed to enact revenge for her father's death. However, a restored Kaneki betrays the CCG in order to rescue her. Her kagune is special among ghouls; unlike most who only have one type, Hinami has two, one from each of her parents. Her kagune include two wing-like growths used as shields from her mother, and two bladed whips from her father.
Nishiki Nishio (西尾 錦, Nishio Nishiki)
Voiced by: Shintarō Asanuma (Japanese); Eric Vale (English)
Played by: Shunya Shiraishi
A ghoul who is a second year student who attends the same university as Ken. He is arrogant and hates it whenever his juniors talk back to him. He is very territorial and is hostile to other ghouls that invade his space. His hunting grounds were stolen from him by Rize after a fight which he lost and he tries to reclaim it after her death, but is stopped by Tōka. He is a loner and fairly good fighter that even small groups of ghouls tend to avoid. Like Tōka, he blends in well with human society, he even has a human girlfriend Nishino Kimi (voiced by Yurie Kobori in Japanese and Caitlin Glass in English) who is aware of his ghoul identity, and is well known at the university. After the time skip, he becomes a powerful S~rank ghoul known as Serpent (オロチ, Orochi), and goes around hunting down and killing CCG investigators as well as other ghouls. He seems to have a great dislike towards both CCG and Aogiri Tree commenting that they are the same and disgusting for creating "fake" ghouls. He reappears on Rushima Island to confront Kanō but fails to capture him. His kagune is a tail-like formation that wraps around his leg and enhances the strength of his kicks beyond those of his rank. In later chapters, this formation has grown in size and can be used as a separate weapon resembling a bident.
Hideyoshi Nagachika (永近 英良, Nagachika Hideyoshi)
Voiced by: Toshiyuki Toyonaga (Japanese); Clifford Chapin (English)
Played by: Kai Ogasawara
Hideyoshi is Ken's best friend, nicknamed "Hide". He has a sharp intuition, so much so that while Ken tried to keep his ghoul identity hidden from him, Hideyoshi seemed to know something is weird about his best friend. Hide has proven to be intelligent and very observant, even figuring out that Rabbit (Tōka) was not Hinami like what CCG had first thought. He will also go to extreme lengths for those he cares about, like venturing to Aogiri's hideout and putting a tracking device on the torturous Yamori. After Ken disappeared, Hideyoshi joined the Anti-Ghoul forces in order to learn about his whereabouts, eventually being promoted to Rookie Investigator and partnered with Kōtarō and Akira. He eventually reunites with Ken and reveals to him that he knows he is Eye Patch, getting himself seriously injured during the raid of Anteiku in the anime and reported to be missing in the manga after speaking to Kaneki, with his fate unknown since then, though it is implied in Tokyo Ghoul: Re that he allowed himself to be consumed by Kaneki in order to have his friend recover for his fight against Arima. He later reappears in some form within Kaneki's mind as a confidant and a physical representation of his compassion. Much later in the sequel, he is revealed to be a misidentified ghoul known as Scarecrow by the CCG. He appears to be leading or at least a part of a terrorist organization whose only goal so far has been to re-take the CCG from Furuta.

== Ghouls ==
=== Anteiku/Black Goat ===
A small neighbourhood café in Tokyo's 20th district, Anteiku is run by Ghouls who intend to blend into society. Providing aid and food for ghouls in need, managing the feeding grounds of the ghouls in the 20th Ward, and collecting food for ghouls by searching for the bodies of humans who committed suicide. It becomes Kaneki's home until the place is raided by the CCG in the end of the original series. Almost all of its original staff become core members of Kaneki's Ghoul coalition "Black Goat", after he assumes the title of One Eyed King.

Renji Yomo (四方 蓮示, Yomo Renji)
Voiced by: Yūichi Nakamura (Japanese); Phil Parsons (English)
Played by: Shuntaro Yanagi
Renji is a quiet and reserved ghoul. He is an expert coffee brewer, although he does not work for the shop anymore as his customer service was lackluster, with most describing him as intense. He then began to procure suicide victims for consumption for ghouls who were either too weak or did not wish to hunt for human prey. Before working for Anteiku he used to be violent and temperamental, much like Tōka from the first series, and would often fight with Uta making the 4th ward uninhabitable. They realized that a battle between them would lead to mutual death, and have been friends since. He also swore revenge on the CCG for killing his older sister but later sees the errors of his ways due to Yoshimura's guidance. He is known to CCG as Raven due to his mask resembling the bird as well as his kagune's pitch black color. Regardless of his cold demeanor he does genuinely care about those around him. He is later seen again with Tōka, working at the ":re" coffee shop. It's later revealed that he is Tōka and Ayato's uncle, who kept his identity a secret from them after their parents' deaths, despite watching over them closely since then. His kagune are two massive pitch black wings with a typical ukaku function in firing projectiles. However, he has an extra special ability to fire lightning-like bolts and also conduct electricity.
Enji Koma (古間 円児, Koma Enji)
Voiced by: Anri Katsu (Japanese); Tyson Rinehart (English)
Played by: Kenta Hamano
An experienced and humorous waiter at Anteiku, frequently acting as manager when Yoshimura is not in. Though he looks harmless, in truth he was once the leader of a violent gang and was called the Devil Ape. He, as well as his friend Kaya, was once a violent and destructive ghoul, and he renounced these ways after Yoshimura's guidance. He emerged from retirement to defend Anteiku as The Devil Ape, leading his old gang of monkey masked ghouls, who once occupied the 20th Ward. The fight leaves him severely wounded and at the Investigator's mercy until he is saved by Kaneki. He escapes through Route V14 with Kaya, and manages to pass by Arima while he was busy fighting Kaneki. His kagune resembles that of a monkey's tail, and is completely prehensile. He uses it not for combat, but rather for repositioning quickly. He is also humorously drawn with a large, bulbous nose.
Kaya Irimi (入見 カヤ, Irimi Kaya)
Voiced by: Fuyuka Oura (Japanese); Morgan Mabry (English)
Played by: Nozomi Sasaki
One of the waitresses at Anteiku, she is a quiet and reserved woman. She was formerly the leader of the dog masked gang Black Dobers and nicknamed the Black Dog prior to encountering Yoshimura, and was rehabilitated by him. Like Enji, she and her old gang come out of retirement, and follow her into battle knowing they will die when CCG raids Anteiku. Presumed to be killed in the occasion, she reappears in the battle of Rushima Island, assisting the ghouls against the CCG. Her kagune resembles dual beetle-like wings with typical ukaku function: firing projectiles. However, her greatest strength lies in her hearing, which she can use to detect location and movement through different sound waves. This ability works without visual aids, and gives Irimi a kind of sixth sense where she can predict attacks as they begin, giving her ample time to counter.

=== Clowns ===
The Clowns is a mysterious group responsible for the accident that led to Kaneki receiving Rize's organs. They later appear in the sequel as the proprietors of an auction for wealthy Ghouls to buy humans which is later broken up by the CCG. After Furuta kills his father, their members start attacks around Tokyo to put the CCG in state of alert, in a plot to have the organization fall into Furuta's hands.

Uta (ウタ)
Voiced by: Takahiro Sakurai (Japanese); Aaron Roberts (English)
Played by: Minosuke Bando
A ghoul that owns Hysy ArtMask Studio, in the 4th ward, he makes masks for both ghoul and human customers alike. He looks very different from the other ghouls in the series, featuring tattoos spanning his body, multiple piercings, a strange haircut and fashion choices. His eyes are his most striking feature, as his irises are permanently red and his sclera permanently black, he has tattooed his eyes to look this way, it's later revealed that he has had ink injected into his sclera. Despite his appearance he is a very calm ghoul, and speaks very kindly and amusingly, with a rather aloof personality. He is known to CCG as "No Face", because of his mask's design. In the past he would often get into fights with Yomo and this caused the 4th ward to become uninhabitable. They realized they would not survive if they fought to death, and have been friends since. He did not reveal his kagune for an exceptionally long time, which was revealed to be duplicating tails. In addition, he possesses a level of regeneration beyond nearly any other ghoul revealed in the series, as well as a unique shapeshifting power that allows him to change his facial features and his voice with near perfect accuracy. He was designed after the Japanese rockstar MIYAVI.
Nico (ニコ, Niko)
Voiced by: Kenjirō Tsuda (Japanese); Christopher Bevins (English)
A feminine and flamboyant ghoul and a member of the Clowns and was affiliated with Aogiri Tree while Yamori was alive. He later makes an appearance in Tokyo Ghoul:re sometime after Kaneki leaves the CCG. He is one of the few Clowns who does not side with Furuta's plot to take over the CCG.
Itori (イトリ)
Voiced by: Ayahi Takagaki (Japanese); Jamie Marchi (English)
Played by: Kang Ji-young
A playful woman that runs a bar in the 14th District. She is old friends with Yomo and Uta, and has an extensive information network. Like Uta, she's revealed to be a member of the Clowns and like them she thrives on creating chaos and destruction. She is fond of drinking blood, possibly hinting at her being a connoisseur like Tsukiyama.
Roma Hoito (帆糸 ロマ, Hoito Roma)
Voiced by: Suzuko Mimori (Japanese); Tia Ballard (English)
A Ghoul that becomes a waitress at Anteiku, fascinated by the stories of Kaneki. She comes across as a cute and shy girl, treated like a little sister by others. However, she is much older than she appears, and has multiple aliases, including that of the SSS rate ghoul "The Dodgy Mother". She's also revealed to be the founder of the Clowns and adores the idea of Kaneki as a tragic hero, and wants to see him suffer more because it "makes him beautiful". In the past she was defeated by Tsuneyoshi Washuu, and was later imprisoned in Cochlea's SS level under the alias "Gypsy" until she was freed during Aogiri's attack on the prison. She is later killed when Urie decapitates her in a fight.
Donato Porpora (ドナート ・ ポルポラ, Donāto Porupora)
Voiced by: Kazuhiko Inoue (Japanese); Greg Dulcie (English)
A powerful Russian Ghoul captured by Urie's father and imprisoned by CCG, who once posed as a Catholic priest and raised Kōtarō Amon. He is considered a valuable source of information on other Ghouls, due to having no loyalty to others. His favorite victims were the orphans he raised. Strangely, he spared Amon after the boy caught him butchering another child. This fact continues to haunt Amon. Once the Cochlea is breached after Haise's betrayal, he manages to escape and rejoin his fellow Clowns. During the Dragon Crisis, Donato is defeated and killed by Amon.

=== Aogiri Tree ===
The Aogiri Tree (青霧の木, Ao kiri no ki), are a group of rogue Ghouls destined to usurp the power from the CCG. Their main objective is to have control over Tokyo's Ghoul wards, whether by infiltration or all-out war. Most of the Ghouls part of the organization are S-rated, such that they are formidable to the CCG.

==== Leader ====
Eto Yoshimura (芳村 愛支, Yoshimura Eto)
Voiced by: Maaya Sakamoto (Japanese); Lindsay Seidel (English)
The founder and leader of Aogiri, she is the half-human daughter of Yoshimura, and the infamous Ghoul known as the One-Eyed Owl (隻眼の梟, Sekigan no Fukurō) and the main antagonist of the original Tokyo Ghoul. When she is not working with Aogiri, she lives under the human identity of Sen Takatsuki (高槻 泉, Takatsuki Sen), the author of Kaneki's favorite horror novels. As an Aogiri executive, she goes under the name Eto (エト). She enjoys breaking people by picking on their insecurities and according to Sasaki, she lost all hope long ago. She becomes obsessed with Kaneki since she sees their circumstances very similar. Not only is her scent neither human nor Ghoul, but she appears to be fully capable of consuming human foods without issue. Her massive kakuja is a mask like-head with four horns and a single eye in the center of the mask with a huge smiling mouth. She is, however, able to alter its appearance, spawning extra appendages, such as eyes, mouths, and limbs if she wills it. She revealed to her subordinates that she isn't the One-Eyed King. After she is defeated by Kaneki during the Tsukiyama family Extermination, she voluntarily turns herself into the CCG where Kaneki is tasked with overseeing her. In a press conference, she reveals to the world her identity as a Ghoul. She also warns Kaneki about an organization named V, that has ties to both humans and Ghouls. During the breach of Cochlea, Eto manages to escape but is defeated by Furuta, who reveals that he had Kanō perform the ghoul operation on him, and has a final meeting with Kaneki before supposedly dying, satisfied that he has defeated Arima and had become strong enough to become the new One-Eyed King. She is later captured and used as the main body for the Taxidermied Owl. She manages to retrieve herself from the kakuja and returns to life, although her final fate is unknown.

==== Direct Subordinates ====
Tatara (タタラ)
Voiced by: Koji Yusa (Japanese); Christopher Wehkamp (English)
The Second-in-Command of Aogiri, a cunning Ghoul with former ties to a group of ghouls known as Chi She Lian, originating in mainland China. He typically does not fight, and mirrors Renji Yomo on Anteiku as he follows his leader (Eto) around as Yomo follows Yoshimura. He never shows emotion and treats all of his subordinates as expendable, unless Ghoul Investigator Kōsuke Hōji appears or is even mentioned. This is because Chi She Lian was destroyed in part by Hōji, who personally killed Tatara's brother and one of his good friends. He first reveals his kagune to be a massive growth with a special pyrokinetic ability. He gravely wounds Seidō Takizawa (Hōji's partner) in this fight, who is later experimented on and is turned into a psychotic ghoul. In his final appearance, he and Takizawa prepare to fight Hōji and his fellow investigators. However, Takizawa betrays Tatara and kills him with ease in Tatara's surprise. Seeking validation from his former superior, Hōji tearfully orders Takizawa's death. However, Takizawa furiously slaughters Hōji's squad.
Noro (ノロ)
Voiced by: Kenji Hamada
A strange Ghoul noted for his enormous appetite and complete silence, he is almost always with Tatara. He possesses an unusual level of regeneration, allowing him to reattach his upper body when sliced in half. He is finally destroyed by a suicide attack from Shirazu during the raid on the Tsukiyama Headquarters, just to be revealed as nothing but a corpse, belonging to the former surrogate parent of Eto, under the control of her detachable kagune, which is retrieved by the CCG and converted into Urie's new Quinque.

Revelation and Legacy

After his defeat, the CCG examines Noro's remains and discovers that he was never truly alive—instead, he was a corpse puppeteered by Eto's detached kagune, which had once belonged to Yoshimura. This revelation ties into the larger narrative of Eto's experiments and her manipulation of kagune biology. The CCG later repurposes the kagune into a powerful Quinque named "Ginkui", which is eventually wielded by Kuki Urie, enhancing his combat abilities significantly.

Themes and Symbolism

Noro's existence explores themes of identity, control, and the grotesque. As a reanimated corpse, he embodies the loss of self, serving as a literal puppet for Eto's will. His mindless violence reflects the dehumanization of Ghouls within the Tokyo Ghoul universe, while his final fate—being turned into a weapon for the CCG—mirrors the cyclical exploitation of Ghouls by both their own kind and humans.

==== Executives ====
Ayato Kirishima (霧嶋 絢都, Kirishima Ayato)
Voiced by: Yūki Kaji (Japanese); Todd Haberkorn (English)
The youngest Executive of Aogiri, and Tōka's younger brother. He is a troubled and rebellious teenager, and resents his sister's choice to live among humans. However, Kaneki suggests that his true reason for joining Aogiri is to protect his sister from afar. Later in the series, he adopts the identity of Black Rabbit and takes credit for his sister's crimes. He also becomes Hinami's partner after she joins the organization and cares deeply for her, to the point of staging an invasion of Cochlea in order to save her from being executed.
Yakumo Ōmori (大守 八雲, Ōmori Yakumo)
Voiced by: Rintaro Nishi (Japanese); Christopher Sabat (English)
A deranged Executive of Aogiri, he was nicknamed "Jason" due to his brutality and habit of wearing a hockey mask and went by the alias Yamori (ヤモリ, lit. Gecko). While imprisoned by CCG in the past, he was tortured by the point of insanity and developed a love of torturing others. He was known as a serial cannibal, and targeted other Ghouls to torture and devour. Yamori tricked Kaneki into surrendering to him in exchange for sparing hostages, and tortured him for 10 days straight. After breaking free, Kaneki defeated him and devoured his kagune before leaving him to die. He was found and killed by Juuzo Suzuya, and turned into Juuzo's Quinque, "Juuzo's Jason".
Naki (ナキ)
Voiced by: Hiro Shimono (Japanese); Josh Grelle (English)
A member of Aogiri that served as Yamori's right-hand man. He is emotionally unstable and extremely childlike, with complete devotion to his late boss. In the sequel, after Yamori has been killed, he has become an Executive of Aogiri. After Kaneki becomes the One Eyed King, he confronts him in order to avenge his former boss, but is defeated, and swears allegiance to him instead.
Miza Kusakari (草刈 ミザ, Kusakari Miza)
Voiced by: Yumiri Hanamori (Japanese); Brittany Lauda (English)
An Executive member of Aogiri whose alias is Three Blades (三枚刃, Sanmaiba). She is the leader of the Blades, a gang in control of the 18th Ward. Miza comes from a clan of inbred Bikaku ghouls that hid underground. Their history of incest has resulted in poor health and dwarfism being common. While seemingly killed by Abara from Suzuya's squad during the raid on Rushima island, she survives alongside Naki and joins Black Goat.
Bin Brothers (瓶兄弟, Bin kyōdai)
Voiced by: Yuki Fujiwara (Japanese); Sonny Strait (English) (Older brother) Voiced by: Sōta Arai (Japanese); Jean-Luc Hester (English) (Younger brother)
Two brothers that were executives at Aogiri Tree. They were referred to as the Tail Brothers by the CCG and were killed by Amon. Their step-sister is Hakatori.

==== Other Subordinates ====
Akihiro Kanō (嘉納 明博, Kanō Akihiro)
Voiced by: Kenji Nomura (Japanese); Mark Stoddard (English)
Played by: Ryo Iwamatsu
The only human among the Aogiri's top members, Akihiro was the surgeon who transformed Kaneki into a half-ghoul. He used to perform illegal experiments with humans and ghouls in secret using Rize's body as a source of material until drawing the attention of Aogiri. Since then he continues his research, now sponsored by the organization with a yet unknown objective.
With the CCG closing in on him and Kurona moments away from taking her revenge for experimenting and discard her and her sister, Kanou casually takes out a pistol and shoots himself in the head. The prolonged, painful death of his mother before he entered college emotionally twisted him into the cruel, amoral man he became.
Karao Saeki (冴木 空男, Saeki Karao)
Voiced by: Hiromichi Tezuka (Japanese); David Matranga (English)
Also known as Torso (トルソー, Torusō), he is a ghoul serial killer who is known for dismembering, then decapitating his victims by only taking their torso, although he only targets females. He was investigated by the CCG's Mado and Shimoguchi Squads. He also develops a sadistic obsession with Mutsuki upon discovering that he is a female in body. He later manages to capture Mutsuki, but is easily killed after the investigator regains his darkest memories from the past.
Shikorae (死堪, Shikoarae)
Voiced by: Kenshō Ono (Japanese)
Formerly known as Rio (凛央, Rio) and Jail (ジェイル, Jeiru), he was captured by Shiki Kijima and imprisoned in the SS level of Cochlea, where he became insane after learning about the death of his older brother. He was found and freed by Eto from the Cochlea during Aogiri's attack on it, and has been seen around the Clown Roma since Aogiri's defeat. He has 4 RC types and has Rinkaku, Bikaku, Koukaku and Ukaku kagune. He's prone to attacking by biting off chunks of flesh from his opponents. He is the protagonist of the game Tokyo Ghoul Jail.
Yumitsu Tomoe (巴 ユミツ, Tomoe Yumitsu)
Voiced by: Nozomi Nishida
Known as Hakatori (墓盗り, Lit. Grave Robber) she is the step-sister of the Bin Brothers and a direct subordinate of Tatara in Aogiri Tree. Her alias is Quinque Hunter (クインケ狩り, Kuinke Gari) and is referred to by Hōguro as Litte Bin. After the destruction of Aogiri Tree, she chooses to go on her own rather than join Goat.

=== Tsukiyama Family ===
Mirumo Tsukiyama (月山 観母, Tsukiyama Mirumo)
Voiced by: Mitsuru Miyamoto (Japanese); Garrett Schenck (English)
A wealthy and highly-eccentric Ghoul, well known within Ghoul society for his extravagance. He is the father of Shū Tsukiyama, the once-infamous Gourmet. He deeply loved his wife, who died while their son was still very young. He describes their relationship as having been a passionate romance, and still keeps a place at the table for her. His kindness to his servants and subordinates has earned him their undying loyalty. When his manor is surrounded by Investigators, he calmly surrenders hoping to live as a human until the end, but the moment he overhears that his son is still endangered, he slaughters his captors and escapes, then alongside Chie, Yomo, and Tōka, arrives to save Shū.
Kanae von Rosewald (カナエ = フォン・ロゼヴァルト, Kanae fon Rozevaruto)
Voiced by: Yuu Kobayashi (Japanese); Jeannie Tirado (English)
A young, eccentric Ghoul and the last survivor of the German branch of the Tsukiyama family, the Rosewalds. After being orphaned, he became a servant to the main Tsukiyama household, and has an unhealthy devotion to his cousin, Shū. He originally worked tirelessly to find some way to save his master from his deep depression, but has been slowly consumed by feelings of jealousy towards Sasaki. It is later revealed that Kanae is actually a woman Karen von Rosewald (カレン = フォン・ロゼヴァルト, Karen fon Rozevaruto), who took on a male identity in order to carry on the legacy and name of the Rosewald clan. Tortured by Eto, she ends up sacrificing herself to save Shū from the collapsing of the Lunar Eclipse building. As she falls to her death Shū calls her by her real name and says he doesn't blame her for falling in love with him.
Matsumae (松前)
Voiced by: Chie Nakamura (Japanese); Julie Shields (English)
A serious and efficient woman that has served the Tsukiyama family for a long time. She has spent her life watching over her young master, as both a nanny and a teacher at his school. Officially, she is the General Manager of the Tsukiyama Group. Matsumae can wrap her kagune around her arms, forming a sword and shield pair and seems to be quite adept at using the shield both offensively and defensively. She's killed by Nimura Furuta after the latter shows his true power.
Mairo (マイロ)
Voiced by: Hinata Tadokoro (Japanese); Nazeeh Tarsha (English)
A servant of the Tsukiyama household, often working alongside Matsumae. During the fight between Hairu and Matsumae, he takes a blow meant for Matsumae, being split in half, but is still able to use the momentum to decapitate Ihei as his upper body falls to the ground. Barely alive, he impales Kijima through the shoulder with his kagune and distracts him long enough for Matsumae to finish the investigator off.

=== Others ===
Kazuichi Banjō (万丈 数壱, Banjō Kazuichi)
Voiced by: Kentarō Itō (Japanese); Ian Sinclair (English)
A ghoul from the 11th Ward, and former associate of Rize. Though a pacifist, he has a strong sense of duty and becomes one of Kaneki's allies. Unlike most Ghouls, his Kagune seems to be used exclusively to heal injuries. He eventually becomes the leader of the 6th Ward succeeding Rize's adopted father, with a large number of Ghouls that follow him. He agrees to help Ayato attack Cochlea to rescue Hinami, in spite of their bitter history.
Matasaka Kamishiro (神代 叉栄, Kamishiro Matasaka)
Voiced by: Kiyoyuki Yanada (Japanese); Andrew T. Chandler (English)
The former leader of the 6th Ward, a powerful Ghoul trained in the martial arts. He was freed from Cochlea during Aogiri's raid and spent time with them, but seems to have broken ties with them in the passing years. He took a young Rize under his wing, adopting her and raising her as his own daughter. He has a reputation among Ghouls for being both a very powerful opponent, and that he also has a moderate dislike for unnecessary killing. This caused friction with Rize as she became more active as a Binge Eater. He was once pursued by Kaneki for his connection to Rize and has become a target of V. Months after the raid at the Tsukiyama Headquarters, Masataka is confronted and captured by Arima.
Kurona and Nashiro Yasuhisa (安久 黒奈, 安久 奈白, Yasuhisa Kurona, Yasuhisa Nashiro)
Voiced by: Aoi Yuuki (Japanese); Michelle Lee (English) (Kurona)
Voiced by: Haruka Tomatsu (Japanese); Michelle Rojas (English) (Nashiro)
Twin sisters that, like Kaneki, became One-Eyed Ghouls due to the manipulations of Dr. Kanō. Formerly CCG trainees in the same class as Kōtarō Amon whose parents were murdered, they were believed to be killed in a CCG operation. They were abandoned by Kanou and labeled as failures after being defeated by their former classmate Jūzō Suzuya. Kurona manages to survive by having parts of her sister's body implanted into her, including her head, which lies at her stomach, and since then she has two kagunes and two ghoul eyes. Kurona eventually joins Black Goat but fails to obtain her revenge on Akihiro Kanou when he takes his own life.
Mayu (痲ユ)
Voiced by: Nozomi Mikajiri (Japanese); Emily Neves (English)
A female ghoul known as Nutcracker (ナッツクラッカー, Nattsukurakkā), with a distinctly violent tendency towards male victims, under investigation by the combined efforts of the Suzuya Squad and the Quinx. She is part of a larger human trafficking ring and obtains "ingredients" for her high-class clients. She turns out to be far more dangerous than CCG assumed, and violently kills her enemies. She's killed during the auction when Shirazu uses one of her own kagune traps to defeat her.
Big Madam (ビッグマダム, Biggu Madamu)
Voiced by: Kimiko Saito (Japanese); Nancy Sherrard (English)
An influential Ghoul involved in the underground society of Ghoul Restaurants and human trafficking. Though considered a major target, she has eluded numerous extermination attempts and uses Nutcracker to obtain "ingredients" for her organization. She is the Ghoul that raised Jūzō Suzuya, using him as a Scrapper and her personal plaything. In spite of her large size, Big Madam is a skilled and deadly opponent. Her appearance belies great agility and incredible strength, allowing her to crawl along walls and dodge attacks from swift opponents. She is defeated by Jūzō and killed by the members of his squad during the raid at the auction. After her death, Big Madam's birth sex is revealed to be male and she is referred to by Jūzō as "Father".
Uruka Minami (三波 麗花, Minami Uruka)
Voiced by: Saori Hayami
A beautiful classmate of Kishou Arima and Taishi Fura who, in secret, was the ghoul serial killer Lantern. Taishi felt attraction towards her and believed she was interested in Arima. She tried to get close to Arima in order to kill him, only for the future CCG investigator to outsmart and defeat her and was finished by Fura, who pitied her after talking to her in her final moments. She seemed to envy the lives of humans and killed Taishi's friends because they apparently annoyed her at school. Her Bikaku Kagune was used to make Taishi's Quinque Lantern, and he admits he has mixed feelings about it.

== Commission of Counter Ghoul (CCG) ==
The Commission of Counter Ghoul (喰種対策局, Gūru Taisaku Kyoku; "Ghoul Countermeasures Bureau"), usually abbreviated as CCG, is a federal agency that serves as a criminal investigative body in cases connected to ghouls, as well as to hunt down and imprison or kill any runaway ghouls. The investigators regardless of class or grade are referred to as Doves (ハト, Hato). In secret, the CCG is run by a family of ghouls disguised as humans. After the Dragon Crisis, the CCG is disbanded and replaced by the Tokyo Security Committee, or TSC, composed of former members of the CCG and ghouls who joined their ranks in their mission to maintain security in the city and develop policies to allow humans and ghouls to coexist.

=== Head ===
Tsuneyoshi Washū (和修 常吉, Washū Tsuneyoshi)
Voiced by: Katsunosuke Hori (Japanese); Dan Caskey (English)
The current Chairman of the CCG and the father of Yoshitoki Washū, and the grandfather of Matsuri Washū. Like all members of the Washū Clan, he is later revealed to be a ghoul disguised as a human and also fathered other children include Rize, Arima and Furuta. He is killed by Furuta with Donato's help.
Yoshitoki Washū (和修 吉時, Washū Yoshitoki)
Voiced by: Shunsuke Sakuya (Japanese); Kent Williams (English)
The Bureau Director of the CCG, and the son of Chairman Tsuneyoshi Washū. He is the father of Matsuri Washū, and the mastermind behind the Quinx Project. Unlike his relatives, he is noted to have an amiable personality and is often at odds with his eldest son. Like all members of the Washū Clan, he is later revealed to be a ghoul disguised as a human. Following the revelation from Marude's exposure, Yoshitoki is killed in the battle.
Kichimura Washū (和修 吉福, Washū Kichimura)
Voiced by: Ōki Sugiyama (Sōta), Daisuke Kishio (Nimura) (Japanese); David Trosko (English)
The main antagonist of Tokyo Ghoul:re. He was originally Sōta Washū-Furuta (和修旧多 宗太, Washū-Furuta Sōta), and later known as Nimura Furuta (旧多 二福, Furuta Nimura) when he is introduced, was originally a Rank 1 Ghoul Investigator who becomes Haise's subordinate after he leaves Kijima Squad. While at first seems harmless, the moment his first partner Shiki Kijima was killed, he revealed his true self and killed Matsumae. He is an alumnus of the Sunlit Garden, an agent of V, and originally was a half-human, but he had Rize's kagune implanted into him in secret with Kanō's help, transforming him into a half-ghoul strong enough to defeat SSS level ghouls like Eto, although if the other agents of V discover his Kagune he could be labeled as a possible target for execution as he performed the procedure in secret. He infiltrated the Clowns under the name Sōta (宗太), the Ghoul that provoked Rize's accident and collaborated with Dr. Kanō, thus collaborating with Kaneki's transformation into a half-ghoul. His talk with Eto revealed he's also an outcast of the Washū Clan, something that angers him greatly. Once all other members of the Washū family are killed, Nimura is instated as the new Bureau Director of the CCG and begins an aggressive campaign to wipe out all Ghouls not affiliated with him in the city, which is a ruse for his true objective, which is to capture Kaneki and use his body to create a massive creature known as the Dragon, which ravages the city of Tokyo, in order to revive Rize. He is ultimately defeated and killed by Kaneki inside the Dragon.

=== Special Class Investigators ===
Kishō Arima (有馬 貴将, Arima Kishō)
Voiced by: Daisuke Namikawa (Japanese); Alex Organ (English)
The protagonist of Tokyo Ghoul: JACK and supporting character in Tokyo Ghoul and Tokyo Ghoul:re, he is a famed Special Class Ghoul Investigator known as the CCG Reaper (CCGの死神, CCG no Shinigami). He is always seen wearing his glasses, with his face kept in an apathetic expression, rarely showing any emotion if not at all. Arima was hailed as a genius within the CCG, stemming from his affiliation with the organization since his teens and quickly rising to the top. Fighting with multiple quinques, he is strong enough to defeat Ghouls that are too strong to be defeated by anyone else in the force. After defeating Ken, he takes him under his guard while he's under the new identity of Haise Sasaki and becomes his mentor, with orders to kill him should he go out of control. After Kaneki regains his memories and betrays the CCG, Arima confronts him once more, just to be defeated. Kaneki spares his life, but Arima opts to commit suicide instead. Before dying, Arima reveals that he, and all alumni from the Sunlit Garden are half-humans. He also reveals that his life was about to end nonetheless, as his left eye was almost blind due to glaucoma, and asks Kaneki to make it look like he was killed by him, to which he complies. After his death, it is revealed that Arima was the one called by Eto as the One-Eyed King (隻眼の王, Sekigan no Ō), who was conspiring with her all along, waiting for a ghoul strong enough to break the current status-quo imposed by the Washū Clan to appear, and both died believing that Kaneki had become suited for such role, inheriting both his will to change the world, as well as his title.
Kōtarō Amon (亜門 鋼太朗, Amon Kōtarō)
Voiced by: Katsuyuki Konishi (Japanese); Mike McFarland (English)
Played by: Nobuyuki Suzuki
Amon is a Rank 1 Anti-Ghoul Investigator and was a partner of Kureo Mado up until his death which was when his partner was switched to Akira Mado up until he disappeared. When he was a little boy he used to live in an orphanage managed by the priest, Donato Porpora, until he found out that he was a ghoul killing his friends. He has a very strong sense of justice and believes that he must make this 'Wrong World' right by killing the ghouls whose murders create orphans, he is very dedicated to his job and begins to work even harder after Kureo is killed. He fought Ken but he lost; however, Ken let him go during their first encounter. During his time as an investigator he would sometimes be playfully teased by his late partner Mado, Shinohara and later by Akira after she became his subordinate. As a human he was extremely fond of sweet food but hated anything that was spicy. Despite his initial hatred towards ghouls Amon has shown to be interested in Kaneki's story and even after getting badly injured and losing his arm to Kaneki when they last meet, he refuses to die, so that Kaneki would not be prosecuted. After the events of the first manga, he was declared KIA after facing Tatara in battle when the Aogiri Tree came while the CCG fought against the One Eyed Owl and was posthumously given a double promotion to the rank of Special Class Investigator, but reappears, transformed into a half-ghoul, to protect Akira from Takizawa when he attacks her. He helps Takizawa come back to his senses through their fight, however is captured by the CCG and held in a test tube. He is rescued by Takizawa and later joins Black Goat along with him. For a long while he avoided talking to Akira because he felt guilty about avoiding her for all the years he was listed as MIA, and whenever he did try to talk with Akira, she would shut him down. He does however get the courage he needs to confront her from Touka and they eventually make up. The two have not been seen since Akira decided to leave Black Goat. He returns during the Dragon Crisis, where he faces against his paternal figure Donato Popora, and despite everything he did to him, Amon still feels saddened after killing him.
Jūzō Suzuya (鈴屋 什造, Suzuya Jūzō)
Voiced by: Rie Kugimiya (Japanese); Maxey Whitehead (English)
A young boy with an androgynous appearance. He was raised by a ghoul called Big Madam until he was taken in by the CCG. He was promoted to a ranked 2 investigator within a year, indicating that he's very capable of exterminating ghouls. Jūzō is very independent and tends to not cooperate with his comrades and superiors. His profile says he likes candy, his Mama (the ghoul that raised him) and ghoul hunting. His behavior is very childish and carefree and he is often seen talking with himself; he calls his other self Rei (his former name). In Tokyo Ghoul:re, Jūzō rises further in the CCG's ranks and becomes leader of his own squad, having matured more thanks to Shinohara and become a responsible, if eccentric, adult. Jūzō is promoted to Special Class at the age of 22, the first to reach the rank that young since Arima.
Kiyoko Aura (安浦 清子, Aura Kiyoko)
Voiced by: Chinatsu Akasaki (Japanese); Mallorie Rodak (English)
A Special Class Investigator, and Division 1 Commander of the 1st Ward. She is the first female Special Class, and has many female admirers as a result. Unlike the other Special Class Investigators, she remains cool and professional during meetings. While remaining single, she gets along quite well with her nephew Shinsanpei, the son of her younger sister. Her Quinque, "Zebez", is as Ukaku-type that can launch homing, explosive projectiles. One month after the raid of Cochlea she is seen in a hospital bed still recovering from wounds inflicted by Kaneki, she tells her nephew to not get caught up in revenge for her.
Yukinori Shinohara (篠原 幸紀, Shinohara Yukinori)
Voiced by: Yutaka Nakano (Japanese); Brandon Potter (English)
A Special Class Ghoul Investigator. He takes in Juzo after he was found by investigators during a raid of one of Big Madam's restaurants. He becomes like a father figure to Juzo, constantly looking out for him and trying to get him out of trouble. One of the more light hearted investigators, he is also well respected and after Akira becomes a subordinate to Amon, the young investigator seeks advice from him. His quinque is a large butcher knife called the Demon Yamada 1. He survives the fight with The Owl and Eto, but his injuries are so severe that he ends up in a vegetative state.
He finally recovers from his vegetative state after eight years thanks to the discoveries made during the Dragon Crisis.
Kōsuke Hōji (法寺 項介, Hōji Kōsuke)
Voiced by: Shō Hayami (Japanese); Wyn Delano (English)
An Associate Special Class Investigator, and partner of Takizawa. He gained considerable fame for his exploits against the Clown Gang, and was recruited to work in China for some time. During this time, he eliminated a major Chinese gang and gained the hatred of Tatara. In the sequel it is shown he's now a Special Class Investigator. After Takizawa eliminates Tatara, Hōji sends his squad to kill him, but is slaughtered by the half-ghoul, along with all of his men, except for Akira.
Kōri Ui (宇井 郡, Ui Kōri)
Voiced by: Yoshinori Fujita (Japanese); Chris Burnett (English)
A Special Class Investigator, and member of the S3 Squad. He is a protege of Kishō Arima, and took part in the battle against the Owl two years ago as the Vice-Commander of Squad Zero. His Quinque's unique properties allow it to be used as a whip or a spear.
Iwao Kuroiwa (黒磐 巌, Kuroiwa Iwao)
Voiced by: Ryūzaburō Ōtomo (Japanese); R. Bruce Elliot (English)
A Special Class Investigator involved in the Owl Incident ten years prior, and Vice-Commander of the 11th Ward Special Countermeasures Unit. He is an old friend of Shinohara, and the two use the same prototype armor. He loses his arm below the elbow in the battle with Owl, but continues serving as Investigator alongside his son Takeomi. While apparently killed by Nimura Furuta after confronting him alongside Urie, he barely manages to survive and recovers by the time of the birth of his first grandchild.
Mōgan Tanakamaru (田中丸 望元, Tanakamaru Mōgan)
Voiced by: Tsuyoshi Koyama (Japanese); Barry Yandell (English)
A Special Class Investigator, assigned as the captain of Squad 2 during major operations. He is highly emotional and prone to eccentric behavior. He wears his hair in a Pompadour style, and has a neat moustache. His Quinque, "Higher Mind", is an Ukaku-type that can fire a long range, energy blast.
Matsuri Washū (和修 政, Washū Matsuri)
Voiced by: Yoshihisa Kawahara (Japanese); Bryan Massey (English)
The son of Yoshitoki Washū, a Special Class Investigator and a commander in Division II. He distinguished himself while serving in Germany, eliminating the Rosewald Family and rapidly climbing the ranks. He opposes the existence of the Quinx, and treats Sasaki with disrespect. He's also known for his callous attitude, and his teams taking heavy losses to get the maximum results, seeing them as expendable. Like all members of the Washū Clan, he is later revealed to be a ghoul disguised as a human. When Matsuri discovers his father's corpse, he vows revenge against Marude, but is attacked by V's assassins, who swore allegiance to Furuta. He is later revealed to have survived the attack, appearing alongside Marude and several other investigators as they manage to oust Furuta from his office.
Itsuki Marude (丸手 斎, Marude Itsuki)
Voiced by: Yūji Ueda (Japanese); Philip Weber (English)
A Special Class Investigator who is known for his abrasive personality to his subordinates. He is the commander of the 11th Ward Special Countermeasures Unit and Chief of Division II. During the battle against Aogiri Tree on Rushima, Marude exposes the Washū's secrets of them being ghoul co-conspirators and ghouls.

=== Associate Special Class Investigators ===
Akira Mado (真戸 暁, Mado Akira)
Voiced by: Asami Seto (Japanese); Morgan Garrett (English)
Kureo's daughter and a Ghoul Investigator like him, she became Kōtarō's partner after her father's death. She is an intelligent woman and seems to be always serious about work and her daily routine in general. Like her father, she has deep insight and intuition that helps her in investigation and determining what is going on around her while on the field. After Kōtarō was declared KIA, she became Haise's team leader and the overseer of the Quinx Squad. Haise has said that she was like a mother to him and Shirazu describes her as the "Holy Mother of CCG". Despite having high regards for Haise, she is wary of his closeness with Hinami, as she is eager to kill her to enact revenge for her father. Akira is very weak to alcohol and can get drunk after drinking only one glass of it. During the battle on Rushima Island, Akira gets herself gravely injured after shielding Takizawa with her body during his fight with Amon and the Quinx Squad and is taken under care of Kaneki and his allies. After a month of being in a coma, through a combined effort of Banjou and the members of the Great Wheel Act, she finally regained consciousness. However, the reality of her situation has weighted heavily on her mind and she had for a very long time refused to speak with anyone including both Amon; (who had avoided her for all the years he was alive making her believe he was dead) and Kaneki for killing Arima. Eventually due to Touka patching up her relationship with herself, Akira and Hinami, Akira breaks out of her depression though a bit confused and apprehensive and was able to finally speak with the others. She was last seen going off with Amon after deciding to leave Black Goat.
She and Amon eventually return to aid the CCG and Black Goat during the Dragon crisis.
Chū Hachikawa (鉢川 忠, Hachikawa Chū)
Voiced by: Kenta Miyake (Japanese); Scott Freeman (English)
An Associate Special Class Investigator, assigned as the captain of Squad 3 during major operations. He is a deranged individual with little regard for life, whether ghoul or human. Heavily scarred and holding a deeper hatred for Ghouls that is abnormal even for Investigators, his hatred of ghouls comes from Irimi killing many of his allies and scarring him. In the battle against Aogiri, he is assigned as Tōru Mutsuki's new superior. He ends up sacrificing himself to allow Tōru and Ayumu escape while he tries to hold off Shikorae and Takizawa.
Shiki Kijima (キジマ 式, Kijima Shiki)
Voiced by: Nobuo Tobita (Japanese); Randy Pearlman (English)
An Associate Special Class Investigator heavily covered in scars obtained when he was attacked by the ghoul nicknamed Jail. He is a sadistic former Interrogator, willing to push the boundaries in pursuit of his prey. His Quinque, "Rotten Follow", is a chainsaw powered by a Kakuhou harvested from Jail's older brother. During the Tsukiyama Extermination, he taunts Matsumae about how he killed her associates Yuuma and Aliza, in response, Matsumae cuts off his arm and causes the chainsaw to come down on his head. He is the main antagonist of Tokyo Ghoul: Jail.

=== First-Class Investigators ===
Taishi Fura (富良 太志, Fura Taishi)
Voiced by: Ryōhei Kimura (Japanese); Duncan Brannan (English)
The other protagonist of Tokyo Ghoul: JACK, Taishi is a First Class Ghoul Investigator. Fura, as a teenager, attended Seishin Senior Highschool along with Arima. Though he never liked school, he usually went shopping and did all the housework, since his mother never did. He had two childhood friends; Ryō, with whom he played baseball and Aki, a girl whom he had a crush on. When Ryō associated himself with a gang of bikers, this led to his death, as he was stabbed by the Kagune of a killer ghoul, "Lantern", whom Arima was currently investigating. Witnessing his friend's tragic death, Fura grew heated for vengeance, and pleaded with Arima to help with his investigation, wanting to know about ghouls right away. Thus, he eventually undertook the career of Ghoul Investigation. Fura had a minor appearance in Tokyo Ghoul and has appeared in Tokyo Ghoul:re.
Kureo Mado (真戸 呉緒, Mado Kureo)
Voiced by: Tōru Ōkawa (Japanese); Kenny Green (English)
Played by: Yo Oizumi
He was a First-Class Investigator and was Kōtarō Amon's partner and mentor. A very experienced and ruthless fighter, he was more than a challenge even for the physically superior ghoul and always trusted his intuition, which was never wrong. His ultimate downfall came from the fact that he was obsessed with quinques (weapons made from the ghouls' kagune) and while fighting Tōka and Hinami, he let his guard down by his fascination with the latter, being killed by them. His daughter, Akira, worked with his partner Kōtarō Amon after his death. His goal was to get revenge on the One-Eyed Owl for killing his wife. Despite his mercilessness towards ghouls, he was a very loving and devoted father, seen when he could have gotten promoted beyond First-Class but decides to decline the promotion because it would mean he would have to face more dangerous adversaries which would increase his chances of dying and leaving his daughter behind, even though such a promotion would have also increased his chances for an encounter with his wife's killer.
Take Hirako (平子 丈, Hirako Take)
Voiced by: Takayuki Kondō (Japanese); Joel McDonald (English)
A First-Class Investigator, and former partner to Arima. He is in command of the 21st Ward, and an exceptionally skilled fighter. In the sequel his squad is working on the Orochi Case, and is responsible for handling Sasaki should he lose control. He gets transferred to the S3 Squad after the Auction, leaving his squad in the hands of Kuramoto. After Arima's death, he decides to follow his former mentor's last wish by breaking all ties with the CCG in order to help Kaneki escape Cochlea.
Kuramoto Itō (伊東 倉元, Itō Kuramoto)
Voiced by: Shinya Takahashi (Japanese); Dallas Reid (English)
A First-Class Investigator, and member of Hirako's team. He is easy-going and cheerful, slowly becoming a good friend to Sasaki and the Quinx. After the Auction, he finds himself suddenly given command of the squad and has misgivings about it.
Ayumu Hogi (穂木 あゆむ, Hogi Ayumu)
Voiced by: Rui Tanabe (Japanese); Morgan Berry (English)
The junior partner of Hachikawa, and a veteran of the battle in the 20th Ward. She is a small and curious young woman, with her face always hidden by her hair. She turns out to have a very young, freckle-covered face, which embarrasses her. She gets promoted to First-Class Investigator.
Hairu Ihei (伊丙 入, Ihei Hairu)
Voiced by: Akira Sekine (Japanese); Jill Harris (English)
A First Class Investigator, alumni of the Sunlit Garden, and partner to Kōri Ui. At 20 years old, she is much younger than her peers and became an Investigator as a teenager. She is a member of the mysterious Squad Zero, commanded by Arima, and took part in the battle in the 20th Ward. She's killed during the fight with Mairo and Matsumae, when she slips on her own blood, which allows Matsumae to impale her and is then decapitated by Mairo. As later revealed by Arima, Hairu, like all alumni of the Sunlit Garden, is a half-human.

=== Rank 1 Investigators ===
Takeomi Kuroiwa (黒磐 武臣, Kuroiwa Takeomi)
Voiced by: Haruki Ishiya (Japanese); Alejandro Saab (English)
A 20-year old Rank 2 Investigator, and member of Team Hirako. He is the son of Special Class Kuroiwa, and considered to be an exceptionally gifted young Investigator. Kuramoto notes that he is among the 0.01% of humans that possesses physical strength above normal human limitations, and can therefore actually fight Ghouls unarmed. He gets promoted to Rank 1 Investigator. He is a friend of Yoriko Kosaka, unaware of her connection with Touka, and later becomes her husband.
Hanbē Abara (黒磐 武臣, Abara Hanbē)
Voiced by: Masakazu Nishida (Japanese); Brad Kurtz (English)
A Rank 1 Investigator and a member of Suzuya Squad.

=== Rank 2 Investigators ===
Seidō Takizawa (滝澤 政道, Takizawa Seidō)
Voiced by: Shinnosuke Tachibana (Japanese); Micah Solusod (English)
A Rank 2 Ghoul Investigator that was Akira's classmate and rival at the Academy. Deeply insecure, he had a tendency to bicker with Akira or Jūzō because of their superior abilities. He deeply admired Amon and defied orders out of concern for his safety, leading him into an ambush by members of Aogiri. He was mortally wounded by Noro, and declared KIA. In Tokyo Ghoul:re, he returns as a major antagonist after being turned into an insane One-Eyed Ghoul by Aogiri. Takizawa's deranged appearance and mindset are made to mirror Ken's, and have made him a manifestation of Haise's fears of what he could one day become should he ever regain his memories. Takizawa turned on the Aogiri by killing Tatara, hoping to be praised as the hero of CCG. Instead, Houji ordered his squad to eliminate him which sent Takizawa into a blind rage, slaughtering all of them. As Takizawa attempts to finish off Akira, Amon appears to stop him. During the fight, Takizawa regains his sanity and ultimately decides to join Black Goat, though the tortures that Aogiri put him through have left him deeply scarred.
Misato Gori (五里 美郷, Gori Misato)
Voiced by: Reina Ueda (Japanese); Trina Nishimura (English)
A skilled Rank 2 Investigator from the 13th Ward. She comes across as harsh, but in truth has a deep admiration for Amon. Despite trying to get Amon's attention by cooking, her food causes everyone that eats them to suffer food poisoning, though she remains oblivious to being responsible. She refuses to believe Amon is dead because of his missing body.

=== Quinx Squad ===
Introduced in Tokyo Ghoul:re, the Quinx Squad are a special group of young investigators mentored by Haise Sasaki. They are essentially "human ghouls" such that they are transplanted with ghoul Kakuhos, allowing the user to form their own kagunes and do replenish their power from feeding on bodies like normal ghouls.

Kuki Urie (瓜江 久生, Urie Kuki)
Voiced by: Kaito Ishikawa (Japanese); Adam Gibbs (English)
A Rank 2 Ghoul Investigator who was the Squad Leader of the Quinx Squad until he was replaced with Ginshi, but he regains the post after Ginshi's death. Kuki often displays himself as a cool-headed individual, but is reckless and vicious when confronting Ghouls, as he hates them with a passion, as his father was a special class investigator in charge of the S3 squad, who ordered his team members to retreat while he stayed to fight the One-Eyed Owl to the death. This hate also extended to Haise after he discovered that he is a half-ghoul instead of just a Quinx. He constantly acts reckless when facing ghouls to gain credit from his superiors; he wishes to be the best ghoul investigator ever. After the battle at the auction, he is promoted to Rank 1, and after the battle with Donato, he is promoted to First Class. Initially he was cold toward his comrades and did not care for them, seeing them as a nuisance and as tools for him to use to gain promotion. His obsession with promotion drives him throughout earlier parts of :Re. However, after going berserk and nearly killing Mutsuki, he slowly becomes less obsessed and starts to care more about his comrades, especially after Shirazu's death.
Ginshi Shirazu (不知 吟士, Shirazu Ginshi)
Voiced by: Yūma Uchida (Japanese); Daman Mills (English)
A Rank 3 Ghoul Investigator and the Squad Leader of the Quinx Squad. Like most of his teammates, Ginshi is shown to have great respect for Haise. However, this doesn't stop him from going out of his way to execute missions without Sasaki's permission, and so he is constantly seen accompanying Urie on dangerous assignments without support. His primary motive for joining the Quinx Squad is to get fast money to treat his sister, who is ill with a rare disease, but his determination to help others earns him Haise's respect, to the point of nominating him as the new leader. After the battle at the auction, he is promoted to Rank 2, but during the ambush at the Tsukiyama Headquarters, he dies from his wounds after confronting and killing Noro from the Aogiri Tree. His body is later stolen by the Aogiri Tree and given to Dr. Kanō for the sake of his research.
Tōru Mutsuki (六月 透, Mutsuki Tōru)
Voiced by: Natsumi Fujiwara (Japanese); Mikaela Krantz (English)
A Rank 3 Ghoul Investigator, Tōru joined the CCG at a young age, the circumstances of which are said to be very mysterious, thus it is unknown if Tōru is his birth name or a chosen one. Tōru struggles to keep his one eyed kakugan under control, much like Kaneki did in the past; he suffers from anemia, and also wears an eye patch similar to Kaneki. Ironically, he feels repulsed when he comes in contact with blood. After the battle at the auction, Tōru receives a double promotion to Rank 1, for putting himself in dire risk in order to grant the success of the operation. After Shirazu's death, Tōru leaves the Quinx squad and puts his ghoul-like superhuman sense of smell to use in investigations. After being captured and dismembered by Torso on Rue Island, Tōru regains his memories and finally consciously accepts that he held responsibility (not the ghouls) for the slaughter of her family. She remembers that she is actually a woman and not a man. Because of this incident, she was taken into the CCG and given the option of undergoing the Quinx operation. She accepts, but requests to live under the identity of a man because she has developed insecurities due to the childhood sexual abuse she suffered from her father. It is revealed that she has a habit of torturing animals and collects tongues in a jar. It is also revealed that during the Auction operation, she had devoured the deceased CCG agents to replenish herself. After this sudden revelation on Rue Island, she brutally butchers and dismembers Torso and escapes. During her work at the CCG, Mutsuki's psychopathic behavior resurfaces; not only because of the torment she suffered, but out of an obsession with Kaneki, for whom she had become in love with. Tōru slowly slips further and further into madness, and decides to hunt Haise down to exterminate him.
Saiko Yonebayashi (米林 才子, Yonebayashi Saiko)
Voiced by: Ayane Sakura (Japanese); Sarah Wiedenheft (English)
A Rank 3 Ghoul Investigator, Saiko dislikes having to work, as she prefers having a lazy and carefree life, playing video games and eating junk food excessively. She often oversleeps, which earns her the absence from most missions. She has an extremely impressive kagune manipulation ability among the Quinx, but rarely puts it to use because it is exhausting; thus, Haise uses her abilities to strike decisive blows after the rest of the squad have weakened the enemy. After the Auction Operation, she is promoted to Rank 2, and after Shirazu's death, becomes vice-captain of the Quinx squad, assuming a more responsible demeanor, leaving behind her NEET lifestyle, and becoming more professional.
Shinsanpei Aura (安浦 晋三平, Aura Shinsanpei)
Voiced by: Makoto Furukawa (Japanese); Michael Jones (English)
He is the nephew of Kiyoko Aura and part of the second batch of Quinx Squad. He is a shy and nervous person and, despite having no special achievements while at the Academy, is expected to have a high potential to be a great investigator.
Tōma Higemaru (髯丸 トウマ, Higemaru Tōma)
Voiced by: Hiromu Mineta (Japanese); Kyle Phillips (English)
Tōma came from a wealthy family as is part of the second batch. He is energetic and admires Saiko.
Ching-Li Hsiao (小 静麗, Shao Jinrī)
Voiced by: Maya Enoyoshi (Japanese); Katelyn Barr (English)
A Taiwanese investigator and part of the second batch. She is also an alumnus of the Sunlit Garden and goes by the name of Genie Hsiao (ジーニーシャオ, Jīnī Shao).

== Other characters ==
Chie Hori (掘 ちえ (ほり ちえ), Hori Chie)
Voiced by: Megumi Han (Japanese); Madeleine Morris (English)
A human photographer and information broker. She is a long-time friend of Shū Tsukiyama, aware of his secret but uninterested in exposing him as a Ghoul. At his request, she serves as an informant to Kaneki's group. She seeks out the members of the Quinx Squad, and offers to sell them information pertaining to Torso. This is because she has an unusual interest in their leader, Sasaki. Despite being the same age as Shuu, she looks like an elementary school student. She has an oddly unique way of seeing the world, always looking for a good picture; she sees things rather impartially and she almost never shows fear.
Shuu (シュウ, Shū)
Voiced by: Kōhei Aoyama (Japanese); Orion Pitts (English)
A ghoul and a resident of the 11th Ward. He is a member of Kazuichi Banjou's group when he is still the leader of the 11th Ward. He deeply loves Haru and wants to protect her from every trouble.
Haru (ハル, Haru)
Voiced by: Yurie Kobori (Japanese); Felecia Angelle (English)
A ghoul and lives at the 11th ward and a member of Kazuichi Banjou's group when he is still the leader of the 11th ward. She and Shuu are lovers and deeply care about each other. She worries about Shuu all the time.
Yoriko Kosaka (小坂 依子, Kosaka Yoriko)
Voiced by: Chinatsu Akasaki (Japanese); Jad Saxton (English)
Played by: Seika Furuhata; Nana Mori
A human who was Tōka's best friend when they attended Kiyomi High School together. She was a very sweet, kind and friendly girl and she cared for her friend deeply. She loves to cook and hopes to become a chef someday. She is now working as a waitress in a bakery, and is an acquaintance of Takeomi Kuroiwa and starts a relationship with him, later becoming his wife. However, when her friendship with Tōka is known by Furuta, he decides to order her execution as a means to lure Kaneki to a trap as well kill her. However, Takeomi aware Furuta bloodlust plan in order eating Yoriko, he was able freeing her just in time. She and her husband witness dragon is born. Several years later, Yoriko and Takeomi later visit Tōka's place with her newborn son.
Yoshiki Ookura (大倉 ヨシキ, Ōkura Yoshiki)
Voiced by: ? (Japanese); Orion Pitts (English)
A human and famous actor and was known for starring in the drama Brainball. He was captured and presented at an Auction with many other victims presented during the Auction event. He was eventually sold off to the highest bidder Mirumo Tsukiyama.
Ichika Kaneki (金木 一花, Kaneki Ichika)
The daughter of Ken Kaneki and Touka Kirishima and a one-eyed ghoul. She appears in the epilogue, 6 years after Kaneki defeats Furuta.
