= Tokyo Ghoul S =

- Theatrical release poster
- Kanji: 東京喰種(トーキョーグール)【S】
- Directed by: Takuya Kawasaki; Kazuhiko Hiramaki
- Screenplay by: Chūji Mikasano
- Based on: Tokyo Ghoul by Sui Ishida
- Starring: Masataka Kubota; Maika Yamamoto; Nobuyuki Suzuki; Kai Ogasawara; Shunya Shiraishi; Mai Kiryū; Hiyori Sakurada; Kunio Murai; Shota Matsuda
- Music by: Tomomi Oda; Naruyoshi Kikuchi
- Production company: Geek Sight
- Distributed by: Shochiku
- Release dates: June 11, 2019 (Tokyo premiere); July 19, 2019 (Japan)
- Running time: 101 minutes
- Country: Japan
- Language: Japanese
- Box office: ¥220,563,600 (Japan)

Tokyo Ghoul S (Japanese: 東京喰種(トーキョーグール)【S】, Hepburn: Tōkyō Gūru Esu; stylized in English as Tokyo Ghoul 'S') is a 2019 Japanese dark fantasy action horror film, and the sequel of the 2017 film Tokyo Ghoul, based on Sui Ishida's manga series Tokyo Ghoul. It was released theatrically in Japan by Shochiku on July 19, 2019. The film has grossed over ¥220 million in Japan, and received mixed reviews from critics.

== Plot ==
After the murder of the model Margaret by Shuu Tsukiyama, a murderous ghoul with epicurean desires, Tsukiyama arrives at Anteiku and approaches Ken Kaneki. Tsukiyama befriends Kaneki, and desires to eat him. Tsukiyama invites Kaneki to the ghoul restaurant, where Kaneki is captured, to be consumed by other ghouls. However, after Tsukiyama's discovery of Kaneki's ghoul eye, and a raid by the CCG, Kaneki escapes alive.

Kaneki meets Kimi Nishino, a human and girlfriend of Nishiki Nishio, who was previously injured by attackers. Nishino is later kidnapped by Tsukiyama, who later demands to eat Kaneki while Kaneki is eating Nishino. Nishio and Touka Kirishima, however, retaliate against Tsukiyama, and free Nishino. Kirishima also intended to kill Nishino due to her being a human knowing the identities of ghouls, however, after Nishino compliments Kirishima's kagune, Kirishima spares her.

== Cast ==
- Masataka Kubota as Ken Kaneki
- Maika Yamamoto as Touka Kirishima
- Shota Matsuda as Shuu Tsukiyama
- Nobuyuki Suzuki as Kōtarō Amon
- Kai Ogasawara as Hideyoshi "Hide" Nagachika
- Shunya Shiraishi as Nishiki Nishio
- Mai Kiryū as Kimi Nishino
- Hiyori Sakurada as Hinami Fueguchi
- Kunio Murai as Yoshimura
- Minosuke Bandō as Uta
- Shuntarō Yanagi as Renji Yomo
- Nana Mori as Yoriko Kosaka
- Jiyoung as Itori
- Maggy as Margaret
- Mackenyu as Sōta

== Production ==
On September 20, 2018, Shochiku teased news about the live-action Tokyo Ghoul film onto its YouTube channel, before formally announcing on September 21, 2018, that a second film was green-lit for a 2019 release under the title "Tokyo Ghoul 2". It was also revealed that Maika Yamamoto would replace Fumika Shimizu as Touka Kirishima after the latter's retirement from acting in 2017. On December 19, 2018, the official website for the film revealed a shot from the film, and the July 19 release date for the film.

On April 11, 2019, the title of the film was announced as Tokyo Ghoul S, and a trailer and theatrical poster for the film was released. On May 28, 2019, the first 150 seconds of the film was released on Shochiku's YouTube channel.

The theme song was revealed at the premiere of the film in Tokyo at June 1, 2019. Queen Bee performs the theme song "Introduction".

== Release ==
Tokyo Ghoul S premiered in Tokyo on June 11, 2019, and in Osaka on June 24, 2019. The film screened theatrically across Japan from July 19, 2019.

Funimation licensed the film for the United States and Canada, and premiered the film in the US at Anime Expo 2019 in Los Angeles on July 6, 2019, and in Canada at Fantasia Festival in Montreal on July 30, 2019. Funimation later provided a wider screening of the film on September 16, 2019. In Australia and New Zealand, Madman Entertainment licensed the film and released the film theatrically from July 25, 2019.

== Reception ==
=== Box office ===
In its opening weekend, Tokyo Ghoul S ranked 7th at the Japanese box office. The film later dropped from the top 10 during the second week, earning a cumulative total of ¥220,563,600 (US$2.02 million) as of July 30, 2019.

=== Critical reception ===
The review aggregator website Rotten Tomatoes reported that 57% of critics have given the film a positive review based on seven reviews, with an average rating of 5.3/10.
