= The New York Times Manga Best Sellers of 2016 =

This is a list of manga that topped The New York Times Manga Best Seller list in 2016.

In January 2017, the Times decided to stop producing the separate manga best seller list.

Date	Book	Author	Publisher
January 3	Tokyo Ghoul, Vol. 4	Sui Ishida	Viz Media
January 10	One-Punch Man (Remake), Vol. 1	One	Viz Media
January 17	Tokyo Ghoul, Vol. 1	Sui Ishida	Viz Media
January 24	One-Punch Man (Remake), Vol. 4	One	Viz Media
January 31	One-Punch Man (Remake), Vol. 4	One	Viz Media
February 7	One-Punch Man (Remake), Vol. 4	One	Viz Media
February 14	Akame ga Kill!, Vol. 5	Takahiro and Tetsuya Tashiro	Yen Press
February 21	My Hero Academia, Vol. 3	Kōhei Horikoshi	Viz Media
February 28	Monster Musume, Vol. 8	Okayado	Seven Seas
March 6	Tokyo Ghoul, Vol. 5	Sui Ishida	Viz Media
March 13	Tokyo Ghoul, Vol. 5	Sui Ishida	Viz Media
March 20	One-Punch Man (Remake), Vol. 5	One	Viz Media
March 27	Yu-Gi-Oh! Zexal, Vol. 8	Shin Yoshida and Naohito Miyoshi	Viz Media
April 3	Goodnight Punpun, Vol. 1	Inio Asano	Viz Media
April 10	No Game No Life, Vol. 4	Yuu Kamiya	Yen Press
April 17	Nichijou: My ordinary life, Vol. 1	Keiichi Arawi	Vertical
April 24	Attack on Titan, Vol. 18	Hajime Isayama	Kodansha Comics
May 1	The Ancient Magus' Bride, Vol. 4	Kore Yamazaki	Seven Seas
May 8	Tokyo Ghoul, Vol. 6	Sui Ishida	Viz Media
May 15	Akame ga Kill!, Vol. 5	Takahiro and Tetsuya Tashiro	Yen Press
May 22	One-Punch Man (Remake), Vol. 6	One	Viz Media
May 29	One-Punch Man (Remake), Vol. 6	One	Viz Media
June 5	Monster Musume: I ♥ Monster Girls, Vol. 1	Various authors and artists	Seven Seas
June 12	Yotsuba&!, Vol. 13	Kiyohiko Azuma	Yen Press
June 19	Orange: The Complete Collection, Vol. 2	Ichigo Takano	Seven Seas
June 26	Tokyo Ghoul, Vol. 1	Sui Ishida	Viz Media
July 3	Tokyo Ghoul, Vol. 1	Sui Ishida	Viz Media
July 10	Tokyo Ghoul, Vol. 7	Sui Ishida	Viz Media
July 17	Tokyo Ghoul, Vol. 7	Sui Ishida	Viz Media
July 24	One-Punch Man (Remake), Vol. 7	One	Viz Media
July 31	One-Punch Man (Remake), Vol. 1	One	Viz Media
August 7	One-Punch Man (Remake), Vol. 1	One	Viz Media
August 14	Tokyo Ghoul, Vol. 1	Sui Ishida	Viz Media
August 21	My Hero Academia, Vol. 5	Kōhei Horikoshi	Viz Media
August 28	Tokyo Ghoul, Vol. 1	Sui Ishida	Viz Media
September 4	Tokyo Ghoul, Vol. 8	Sui Ishida	Viz Media
September 11	Tokyo Ghoul, Vol. 8	Sui Ishida	Viz Media
September 18	Monster Musume, Vol. 9	Okayado	Seven Seas
September 25	One-Punch Man (Remake), Vol. 8	One	Viz Media
October 2	One-Punch Man (Remake), Vol. 8	One	Viz Media
October 9	One-Punch Man (Remake), Vol. 1	One	Viz Media
October 16	Fairy Tail, Vol. 56	Hiro Mashima	Kodansha
October 23	Yona of the Dawn, Vol. 2	Mizuho Kusanagi	Viz Media
October 30	One-Punch Man (Remake), Vol. 1	One	Viz Media
November 6	Tokyo Ghoul, Vol. 9	Sui Ishida	Viz Media
November 13	Tokyo Ghoul, Vol. 9	Sui Ishida	Viz Media
November 20	One-Punch Man (Remake), Vol. 1	One	Viz Media
November 27	The Legend of Zelda: Legendary Edition, Vol. 1	Akira Himekawa	Viz Media
December 4	The Legend of Zelda: Legendary Edition, Vol. 1	Akira Himekawa	Viz Media
December 11	The Legend of Zelda: Legendary Edition, Vol. 1	Akira Himekawa	Viz Media
December 18	The Legend of Zelda: Legendary Edition, Vol. 1	Akira Himekawa	Viz Media
December 25	The Legend of Zelda: Legendary Edition, Vol. 1	Akira Himekawa	Viz Media

== See also ==
- The New York Times Fiction Best Sellers of 2016
- The New York Times Non-Fiction Best Sellers of 2016
