= Tokyo Ghoul: re Call to Exist =

- Developer: Three Rings
- Publisher: Bandai Namco Entertainment
- Platforms: Microsoft Windows; PlayStation 4
- Release: JP: November 14, 2019; WW: November 15, 2019
- Genres: Survival, action
- Modes: Single-player, multiplayer

Tokyo Ghoul: re Call to Exist (Note: Japanese: Tōkyō Gūru: re Call to Exist (東京喰種(トーキョーグール)：re 【CALL to EXIST】)) is a survival action video game developed by Three Rings and published by Bandai Namco Entertainment for Microsoft Windows and PlayStation 4 in November 2019. It is based on Sui Ishida's manga series Tokyo Ghoul and Tokyo Ghoul: Re.

== Gameplay ==
Tokyo Ghoul: re Call to Exist is a third-person survival action game in which players can choose to be on the side of ghouls or investigators, with playable characters including Haise Sasaki, Ken Kaneki, Kōtarō Amon, Kishō Arima, Tōuka Kirishima, and Shū Tsukiyama. The game has an online multiplayer mode.

== Development ==
Tokyo Ghoul: re Call to Exist was developed by Three Rings, and is based on Sui Ishida's manga series Tokyo Ghoul (2011–2014) and Tokyo Ghoul: Re (2014–2018).

The game was released by Bandai Namco Entertainment for PlayStation 4 in Japan on November 14, 2019, and for both PlayStation 4 and Microsoft Windows internationally on November 15, 2019. It had originally been slated for release in late 2018, but was delayed due to quality concerns.

== Reception ==
Reception

Aggregate score
Aggregator	Score
Metacritic	PS4: 58/100

Tokyo Ghoul: re Call to Exist was met by mixed reviews, ranging from positive to negative, according to the review aggregator Metacritic.

The game's physical release sold an estimated 4,500 copies in Japan during its debut week, ranking as the 15th best selling physical video game in Japan during the time period; by its second week on sale, it no longer charted on Famitsu's weekly top 30 sales chart.
