= Maggy (model) =

Japanese model and YouTuber

- マギー
- Born: Natsuki Margaret Gibb; 14 May 1992 (age 34); Amagasaki, Hyōgo, Japan
- Occupations: Model, tarento, actress and YouTuber
- Years active: 2008–present
- Agent: LesPros
- Website: Maggy; Maggy's Beauty and the Speed

Natsuki Margaret Gibb (ギブ・奈月・マーガレット, Gibu Natsuki Māgaretto; born 14 May 1992 in Amagasaki, Hyōgo), known professionally as Maggy (マギー, Magī), is a biracial (hāfu) Japanese Canadian model, tarento, actress and YouTuber. She is known for many television shows such as Sport on Fuji TV (2009-), NTV's Hirunandesu! (2014-) and Buzz Rhythm (2015-). Her YouTube videos are about exotic cars and hobbies.

== Career ==
Maggy is of Scottish Canadian (her father Iain Gibb is a voice actor and narrator) and Japanese descent (Japanese mother). As she spent her childhood in Halifax, Canada with relatives, she speaks both English and Japanese. In 2008, at the age of sixteen, she was scouted by her current agent, and won the Best Smile Award in the LesPros Girls Audition 2008. Then she made her debut in entertainment industry. In April 2009, she appeared in the sports news program Sport on Fuji TV. This show made her name popular. Since October 2014, she appears as a regular guest on NTV's variety show Hirunandesu! every Monday. She also hosts the variety show Buzz Rhythm with Japanese comedian Bakarhythm on NTV since April 2015. She also often participates in fashion events such as the Tokyo Girls Collection, and is part of the stable of magazine models Vivi and Cutie.

She made her debut as an actress with the role Yona in the NHK drama Moribito: Guardian of the Spirit which started on November 25, 2017. Her first appearance in a movie was Tokyo Ghoul S where she played Margaret and it released on July 19, 2019.

On September 20, 2020, Maggy started a YouTube channel called Maggie's Beauty and the Speed. The videos are about cars and her hobbies and primarily in Japanese. As of May 24, 2022 the channel has 95.8 thousand subscribers.

== Appearances ==
=== Film ===
- Tokyo Ghoul S (2019)

=== TV ===
- Moribito: Guardian of the Spirit (2017)

=== Events ===
- Girls Award (2011 S/S, 2011 A/W, 2014 A/W, 2015 S/S)
- Tokyo Girls Collection (2011 A/W, 2012 A/W, in Nagoya, 2012 S/S, 2014 S/S, 2014 A/W, 2015 S/S)
- Kobe Collection (2011 A/W, 2012 A/W, 2013 A/W)
- Tokyo Runway (2012 A/W, 2013 S/S, 2013 A/W, 2014 A/W, 2015 S/S)

=== Radio ===
- Current (October 2011 - March 2013, FM Yokohama)
- Hamarabo (April 2012 - September 2012, FM Yokohama)

=== Dubbing ===
- Strays (Maggie)

== Discography ==
=== Singles ===
- Niji no Mukou e (Sony Music Direct, 27 July 2011)

== Bibliography ==
=== Magazines ===
- CUTiE, Takarajimasha 1989-, as a regular model
- ViVi, Kodansha 1983-, as an exclusive model since 2010

=== Photobooks ===
- Maggy,Maggy,Maggy…… (Kodansha, 18 November 2013) ISBN 9784063649307
- I'm Maggy (Kodansha, 2 December 2015) ISBN 9784062198981
- Your Maggy (Kodansha, 2 December 2015) ISBN 9784062198974
