= Choujin X =

Japanese manga series by Sui Ishida

- First tankōbon volume cover, featuring Tokio Kurohara

超人X (Chōjin Ekkusu)
- Genre: Action; Supernatural
- Manga
- Written by: Sui Ishida
- Published by: Shueisha
- English publisher: NA: Viz Media
- Imprint: Young Jump Comics
- Magazine: Tonari no Young Jump; Weekly Young Jump (October 14, 2021 – February 4, 2022)
- Original run: May 10, 2021 – present
- Volumes: 17
- icon

Choujin X (Japanese: 超人X, Hepburn: Chōjin Ekkusu) is a Japanese manga series written and illustrated by Sui Ishida. It has been irregularly serialized on Shueisha's Tonari no Young Jump website since May 2021 and in Weekly Young Jump from October 2021 to February 2022.

== Synopsis ==
Azuma Higashi (東 アズマ, Higashi Azuma) has great fighting skills as well as a strong sense of justice, and also always gets good grades in his class. His friend Tokio Kurohara (黒原 トキオ, Kurohara Tokio) is the complete opposite of Azuma: he does not listen in class, and is a bystander when Azuma fights. Different as they might be, their bond is very strong nevertheless. They live in Yamato Prefecture, where the district has almost been destroyed by Choujin, humans with supernatural abilities. When the two are returning home, they encounter a Choujin who threatens to kill them. With no other way of escaping, the two decide to become Choujin themselves. The story centers around their adventures and struggles as they try to navigate the chaotic and often dangerous life of a Choujin.

== Publication ==
Choujin X, written and illustrated by Sui Ishida, was first announced in November 2020. With an irregular serialization, with chapters released according to Ishida's own schedule, Choujin X began serialization on Shueisha's Tonari no Young Jump website on May 10, 2021. It was also serialized in Weekly Young Jump from October 14, 2021, to February 4, 2022, only continuing its serialization on the website. Shueisha released its first two tankōbon volumes on December 17, 2021.

The series is simultaneously published in English on Viz Media's website and Shueisha's Manga Plus online platform.

=== Volumes ===
No.	Original release date	Original ISBN	English release date	English ISBN
1	December 17, 2021	978-4-08-892166-2	February 21, 2023	978-1-9747-3669-0
1. "Behold the Man"; 2. "Uncrossed Paths! Two Choujin" (交わらず！ふたりの超人, Majiwarazu! Futari no Chōjin); 3. "Stand by the West"; 4. "6/14 Innocent World" (6月14日 / innocent world, Rokugatsu Jūyon-nichi / Innocent World); 5. "44"; 6. "First Apostasy"
2	December 17, 2021	978-4-08-892167-9	May 16, 2023	978-1-9747-3687-4
7. "Broiler"; 8. "My Benefit"; 9. "Sinker, Part 1–Grounder Boy" (Sinker ① Goro); 10. "Sinker, Part 2–Dead Ball" (Sinker ② Dead Ball); 11. "Sinker, Part 3–Night Game" (Sinker ③ Night Game); 12. "Sinker, Part 4–Benchwarmer"" (Sinker ④ Bench Warmer); 13. "Sinker, Part 5–Pitch Hitter" (Sinker ⑤ Pinch Hitter); 14. "Sinker, Part 6–Sayonara" (Sinker ⑥ Sayonara); 15. "Fly"
3	May 18, 2022	978-4-08-892318-5	August 15, 2023	978-1-9747-3759-8
16. "Chicken and Dog"; 17. "Pack! Pack!"; 18. "Hip Hip Hooray and Heave-Ho" (ヤンヤヤンヤでドッコイショ, Yan'yayan'ya de Dokkoisho); 19. "Paper Trip"; 20. "Moon Beast" (ムーンビースト, Mūn Bīsuto); 21. "A Cloaker"
4	September 16, 2022	978-4-08-892458-8	November 21, 2023	978-1-9747-4074-1
22. "Arm Wrestling" (うでずもう, Udezumō); 23. "Q.E.F."; 24. "exceeds"; 25. "Vision"; 26. "Summer on Beast Island" (夏の獣島, Natsu no Kemono Shima); 27. "Branch Training" (ブランチトレーニング, Buranchi Torēningu)
5	January 19, 2023	978-4-08-892573-8	February 20, 2024	978-1-9747-4303-2
28. "Festivo"; 29. "Black Show Introduction" (ブラックショー・イントロダクション, Burakku Shō Intorodakushon); 30. "Chaosy" (混沌化, Konton-ka); 31. "Spiral/Rasen" (螺旋/Rasen); 32. "Tower of Mourning" (弔いの塔, Tomurai no Tō); 33. "zora"
6	May 19, 2023	978-4-08-892691-9	May 21, 2024	978-1-9747-4555-5
34. "I Got 2 know" 35. "High School, Second Year" (高2, Kō 2); 36. "Who are you?"
7	September 19, 2023	978-4-08-892792-3	September 17, 2024	978-1-9747-4873-0
37. "On the turn" 38. "Opium" (阿片, Ahen); 39. "As you sleep" (あなたが眠るころに, Anata ga Nemuru Koro ni); 40. "Dose me, dose me"
8	December 19, 2023	978-4-08-893018-3	February 18, 2025	978-1-9747-5178-5
41. "Hyena" (ハイエナ, Haiena); 42. "Closed System" (閉鎖空間, Heisa Kūkan); 43. "Nude" (裸, Ratai)
9	April 18, 2024	978-4-08-893219-4	June 17, 2025	978-1-9747-5567-7
44. "Blessing of blood" (血の祝福, Chi no Shukufuku); 45. "The world of work" (しごのせかい, Shi go Nose Kai); 46. "Playing Cards" (プレイング・カード, Pureingu Kādo); 47. "Our Risks" (わたしたちのリスク, Watashi-tachi no Risuku); 48. "Harvester"; 49. "The Matters Leading Up to August 1999" (1999年八月までのこと, 1999-Nen Hachigatsu Made no Koto)
10	July 18, 2024	978-4-08-893269-9	November 18, 2025	978-1-9747-5882-1
50. "The Events Following December 1999" (1999年十二月からのこと, 1999-Nen Jūnigatsu Kara no Koto); 51. "Fragment" (フラグメント, Furagumento); 52. "Zora's Elimination -Barricade-" (ゾラ討伐 〜廓〜, Zora Tōbatsu 〜Kuruwa〜)
11	November 19, 2024	978-4-08-893428-0	February 17, 2026	978-1-9747-6213-2
53. "Zen/Then" (膳/then, Zen/then); 54. "Zora's Elimination -Outpost-" (ゾラ討伐〜前哨〜, Zora Tōbatsu 〜Zenshō〜); 55. "Mist,I" (靄/I, Moya/I); 56. "Zora's Elimination -Stone Wall-" (ゾラ討伐 〜石垣〜, Zora Tōbatsu 〜 Ishigaki 〜); 57. "Zora's Elimination -Drybridge-" (ゾラ討伐 〜桔橋〜, Zora Tōbatsu 〜Hanebashi〜); 58. "Request/cue" (ゾ求/cue, Motome/cue)
12	April 17, 2025	978-4-08-893571-3	May 19, 2026	978-1-9747-6334-4
59. "Empty" (から, Kara); 60. "At the End of the Pilgrimage" (巡礼路の終わりに, Junrei-ji no Owari ni); 61. "Go To The Future"
13	August 19, 2025	978-4-08-893786-1	September 15, 2026	978-1-9747-6661-1
62. "Stripped"; 63. "Hear the Newborn's Cry" (産声をきく, Ubugoe o Kiku); 64. "Not you anymore"
14	November 19, 2025	978-4-08-894014-4	January 19, 2027	978-1-9747-6857-8
65. "Happy Ending" (ハッピーエンド, Happī Endo); 66. "400km^{2}"; 67. "The Throne Shatters" (玉座は砕け, Gyokuza wa Kudake)
15	February 19, 2026	978-4-08-894138-7	—	—
68. "Beyond the Window, Clouds" (窓の向こう, 雲, Mado no Mukō, Kumo); 69. "Witch" (魔女, Majo)
16	June 18, 2026	978-4-08-894227-8	—	—
70. The Events Leading Up to March 2003, Part 1 (2003年3月までのこと《前編》, 2003-Nen Sangatsu Made no Koto《Zenpen》); 71. The Events Leading Up to March 2003, Part 2 (2003年3月までのこと《後編》, 2003-Nen Sangatsu Made no Koto《Kōhen》); 72. Behold the marked
17	September 17, 2026	978-4-08-894356-5	—	—
73. figure it out 74. "The Newcomers" (新参者たち, Shinzanmono-tachi); 75. "That Bird" (その鳥は, Sono Tori wa); 76. Charming
18	December 17, 2026	978-4-08-894445-6	—	—

=== Chapters not yet in tankōbon format ===
These chapters have yet to be published in a tankōbon volume.

77. "Cheese Pasta" (チーズパスタ, Chīzu Pasuta)
78. origami anchor
79. "Dozamovsky's Ghost Ship" (ドザモフスキーの幽霊船, Dozamofusukī no Yūreisen)

== Reception ==
The first and second volumes sold 33,113 and 29,852 copies (respectively) in their first week; they sold 40,141 and 36,085 copies (respectively) in their second week. By December 2022, the manga had sold over 1 million copies.

The series ranked 13th in the Nationwide Bookstore Employees' Recommended Comics of 2023. The manga placed sixth in Rakuten Kobo's second E-book Award in the "I Want to Deliver It to the World! Top Recommended Manga" category in 2024.
