= Jack Jeanne =

2021 video game

- Developer(s): Broccoli
- Publisher(s): JP: Broccoli; NA/EU: Aksys Games
- Designer(s): Sui Ishida
- Artist(s): Sui Ishida
- Writer(s): Sui Ishida; Shin Towada
- Composer(s): Akira Kosemura
- Platform(s): Nintendo Switch, Android, iOS
- Release: Nintendo Switch: JP: March 18, 2021; NA/EU: June 15, 2023; Android and iOS: JP: March 18, 2023
- Genre(s): Visual novel, rhythm, dating sim, otome
- Mode(s): Single-player

Jack Jeanne (Japanese: ジャックジャンヌ, Hepburn: Jakku Jannu) is an otome visual novel with dating sim and rhythm game elements. A sequel has been announced.

== Gameplay ==
Players read dialogue between characters during story scenes in a visual novel format. Players have the option to skip previously read dialogue.

Each in-game day, the player chooses what classes Kisa takes, if she should rest, or if she should talk to other characters. Kisa's health meter depletes every time she takes a class, increasing the chances of her failing a lesson the lower it goes, but it can be replenished by letting Kisa rest. All of these activities adjust Kisa's stats. Kisa's stats, the number of times Kisa visits characters, and what dialogue options the player chooses all factor into which events take place between characters.

Players complete different rhythm games for singing and dancing. For the singing games, the player moves a cursor left or right to follow a line of notes. For the dancing games, players hit one of four different buttons or tap one of four different icons when falling icons hit indicators at the bottom of the screen. The game allows players to choose a difficulty level for the rhythm games, and reaching a certain score during the dancing games affects the game's story and ending.

The game's gallery feature allows players to replay the rhythm game performances, read the full scripts for the plays performed by the characters, listen to the game's background music, re-watch the performance music videos, view CGs, re-read certain scenes, and view achievements after the player unlocks them.

== Plot ==
As children, Kisa Tachibana and her older brother Tsuki loved acting. Tsuki attended the prestigious boys-only Univeil Drama School, and disappeared after graduating. Wanting to continue performing just like him, Kisa cross-dresses to be able to attend the school.

Univeil has four classes, each with separate dorms. The four classes are Quartz, Onyx, Rhodonite, and Amber.

At Univeil, students choose to train for playing male or female parts during the performances, and these students are known as "Jacks" or "Jeannes" respectively. The top-performing Jack or Jeanne in a class is referred to as "Jack Ace" or "Al Jeanne" respectively.

== Development ==
Sui Ishida created the game's lyrics, character designs, and in-game illustrations, and he worked on the game's worldbuilding. He took on the task of writing the game's lyrics himself because he wanted the character's songs to better reflect them, and he convinced the composer Akira Kosemura to work on the game after being inspired by his songs.

== Related media ==
Shueisha has published books about the game: JACK JEANNE Complete Collection -sui ishida works- (ジャックジャンヌ Complete Collection ―sui ishida works―) (ISBN 978-4-08-792743-6), a nonfiction book containing concept art, in-game illustrations, and an interview between Sui Ishida and Shin Towada, the latter of whom co-wrote the game's story; and JACK JEANNE -Summer Play- (ジャックジャンヌ ―夏劇―, JACK JEANNE -Natsugeki-) (ISBN 978-4-08-703509-4), a tie-in novel written by Shin Towada and illustrated by Sui Ishida which includes a story not seen in the main game.

A sequel to the game, as well as a new drama CD, novel, and stage reading were announced on the game's third anniversary.

== Reception ==
Reception

Aggregate scores
Aggregator	Score
Metacritic	Switch: 90/100
OpenCritic	100%

Review scores
Publication	Score
RPGFan	91/100
Digitally Downloaded	5/5
Siliconera	9/10

RPGFan and Digitally Downloaded considered the rhythm game sections "solid additions to the game" and a "nice highlight" respectively. Digitally Downloaded praised the game's art style in its CGs as well as the look and choreography of the game's dancing scenes, though RPGFan considered the graphics of the game's dancing scenes to be "not as compelling as the visual novel illustrations" and distracting while playing the rhythm game.

Reviewers praised the game's narrative. Siliconera praised the game's approach to and acceptance of characters who cross-dress or have a nonconforming gender presentation. Digitally Downloaded writer Matt S. "was impressed by the maturity and restraint" that the writers had in regards to Kisa's cross-dressing.

As of February 12, 2024, the game had sold over 100,000 copies worldwide.
