= Hiyori Sakurada =

Japanese actress

- 桜田 ひより
- Born: December 19, 2002 (age 23); Chiba, Japan
- Occupation: Actress
- Years active: 2009–present
- Agent: Ken-On

Hiyori Sakurada (桜田 ひより, Sakurada Hiyori; born December 19, 2002 in Chiba) is a Japanese actress.

== Filmography ==
=== Film ===
| Year | Title | Role | Notes | Ref(s) |
|---|---|---|---|---|
| 2015 | Poison Berry in My Brain | Hatoko | | |
| 2016 | Bittersweet | Minami Aoi | | |
| 2017 | Tokyo Ghoul | Hinami Fueguchi | | |
| 2018 | Saki Achiga-hen episode of side-A | Shizuno Takakamo | Lead role | |
| 2018 | The Crimes That Bind | Hiromi Asai (14 years old) | | |
| 2018 | You, I Love | Mika Saeki | | |
| 2019 | Hot Gimmick: Girl Meets Boy | Akane Narita | | |
| 2019 | Hakubo | Sachi Koyama (voice) | Lead role | |
| 2019 | Tokyo Ghoul S | Hinami Fueguchi | | |
| 2019 | Tora-san, Wish You Were Here | Yuri Suwa | | |
| 2020 | Keep Your Hands Off Eizouken! | Parker Dōmeki | | |
| 2020 | Humanoid Monster Bela | Saori Makino | | |
| 2020 | Demon Girl | Tiara Matsumaru | | |
| 2021 | Perfect Strangers | Chie Rokkō | | |
| 2021 | The Bonds of Clay | Moe | | |
| 2021 | The Magic of Chocolate | Airi Nishina | | |
| 2022 | Mr. Osomatsu | Chibita | | |
| 2023 | Our Secret Diary | Nozomi Kuroda | | |
| 2024 | Buzzy Noise | Ushio | Lead role | |
| 2024 | Blue Period | Maru Mori | | |
| 2025 | Under the Big Onion | Miyu Murakoshi | Lead role | |
| 2025 | Catching the Stars of This Summer | Asa Tanimoto | Lead role | |
| 2026 | A Side Character's Love Story | Nobuko Tanaka | Lead role | |
| 2026 | Tokyo MER: Mobile Emergency Room – Capital Crisis | Arisa Kasuga | | |
| 2026 | Hoshi no Kyoshitsu | Sayaka Uruma | Lead role | |
| 2026 | Finding My Punchline | Komori | | |

=== Television ===
| Year | Title | Role | Notes | Ref(s) |
|---|---|---|---|---|
| 2014 | Tomorrow, Mom Won't Be Here | Piami | | |
| 2014 | Soko o Nantoka | Hinako | | |
| 2014 | Hero | Reina Saitō | | |
| 2016 | The Unbrokwn | Junko Onchi (young) | | |
| 2017 | Saki | Shizuno Takakamo | Lead role | |
| 2017–18 | AIBOU: Tokyo Detective Duo | Rina Ichihara | | |
| 2020 | Ms. Koizumi Loves Ramen Noodles | Ms. Koizumi | Lead role | |
| 2020 | Keep Your Hands Off Eizouken! | Parker Dōmeki | | |
| 2020 | Kotonoha | Saki Sakuragi | Lead role; TV movie | |
| 2020 | 24 Japan | Miyu Shidō | | |
| 2022 | Rent-A-Girlfriend | Chizuru Mizuhara | | |
| 2022 | What Six Survivors Told | Riri Mizukami | Lead role | |
| 2022 | Silent | Moe Sakura | | |
| 2023 | Giver Taker | Yayoi Arisaka | | |
| 2023 | Seasoned Connections | Kiyomi Atari | Lead role | |
| 2024 | My Girlfriend's Child | Sachi Kawakami | Lead role | |
| 2025 | Escape | Yui "Hachi" Yagami | Lead role | |

=== Japanese dub ===
| Year | Title | Role | Notes | Ref(s) |
|---|---|---|---|---|
| 2023 | I Am What I Am | Juan | | |

== Awards and nominations ==
| Year | Award | Category | Work(s) | Result | Ref(s) |
|---|---|---|---|---|---|
| 2024 | 47th Japan Academy Film Prize | Newcomer of the Year | Our Secret Diary | Won | |
| 2024 | Elle Cinema Awards 2024 | ElleGirl Rising Star | Buzzy Noise and Blue Period | Won | |
