= Tokyo Ghoul =

Japanese manga series

- First tankōbon volume cover, featuring Ken Kaneki

東京喰種(トーキョーグール) (Tōkyō Gūru)
- Genre: Dark fantasy; Supernatural thriller
- Manga
- Written by: Sui Ishida
- Published by: Shueisha
- English publisher: NA: Viz Media
- Imprint: Young Jump Comics
- Magazine: Weekly Young Jump
- Original run: September 8, 2011 – September 18, 2014
- Volumes: 14
Further information
Light novel
Written by	Shin Towada
Illustrated by	Sui Ishida
Published by	Shueisha
English publisher	NA: Viz Media
Imprint	Jump J-Books
Original run	July 19, 2013 – December 19, 2014
Volumes	3
Manga
Tokyo Ghoul [Jack]
Written by	Sui Ishida
Published by	Shueisha
English publisher	NA: Viz Media
Imprint	Young Jump Comics Digital
Magazine	Jump Live
Original run	August 2013 – September 2013
Volumes	1
Anime television series
Directed by	Shuhei Morita
Produced by	Ken Hagino; Hajime Maruyama; Yoshito Danno; Hidetada Soga
Written by	Chūji Mikasano
Music by	Yutaka Yamada
Studio	Studio Pierrot
Licensed by	Crunchyroll (Note: In North America through Crunchyroll, LLC formerly known as Funimation, and in Australia through Madman Anime.); UK: Anime Limited
Original network	Tokyo MX, TV Aichi, TVQ, TVO, AT-X, Dlife
English network	UK: Viceland; US: Adult Swim (Toonami)
Original run	July 4, 2014 – September 19, 2014
Episodes	12
Manga
Tokyo Ghoul:re
Written by	Sui Ishida
Published by	Shueisha
English publisher	NA: Viz Media
Imprint	Young Jump Comics
Magazine	Weekly Young Jump
Original run	October 16, 2014 – July 5, 2018
Volumes	16
Anime television series
Tokyo Ghoul √A
Directed by	Shuhei Morita
Produced by	Ken Hagino; Hajime Maruyama; Yoshito Danno; Hidetada Soga
Written by	Chūji Mikasano
Music by	Yutaka Yamada
Studio	Studio Pierrot
Licensed by	Crunchyroll; UK: Anime Limited
Original network	Tokyo MX, TV Aichi, TVQ, TVO, AT-X, Dlife, MRO
English network	UK: Viceland; US: Adult Swim (Toonami)
Original run	January 9, 2015 – March 27, 2015
Episodes	12
Original video animation
Tokyo Ghoul [Jack]
Directed by	Sōichi Shimada
Produced by	Ken Hagino; Hajime Maruyama; Yoshito Danno; Hidetada Soga
Written by	Chūji Mikasano
Music by	Yutaka Yamada
Studio	Studio Pierrot
Licensed by	Crunchyroll; UK: Anime Limited
Released	September 30, 2015
Runtime	30 minutes
Original video animation
Tokyo Ghoul: Pinto
Directed by	Tadahito Matsubayashi
Produced by	Ken Hagino; Hajime Maruyama; Yoshito Danno; Hidetada Soga
Written by	Sōichi Shimada
Music by	Yutaka Yamada
Studio	Studio Pierrot
Licensed by	Crunchyroll; UK: Anime Limited
Released	December 25, 2015
Runtime	24 minutes
Light novel
Tokyo Ghoul:re
Written by	Shin Towada
Illustrated by	Sui Ishida
Published by	Shueisha
Imprint	Jump J-Books
Published	December 19, 2016
Anime television series
Tokyo Ghoul:re
Directed by	Toshinori Watanabe
Produced by	Ken Hagino; Yoshito Danno; Hidetada Soga
Written by	Chūji Mikasano
Music by	Yutaka Yamada
Studio	Studio Pierrot (Note: Production assistance (制作協力) for all episodes provided by Pierrot+.)
Licensed by	Crunchyroll; SEA: Medialink; UK: Anime Limited
Original network	Tokyo MX, Sun TV, TVA, TVQ, BS11
English network	UK: Viceland
Original run	April 3, 2018 – December 25, 2018
Episodes	24
Live-action film
Tokyo Ghoul (2017); Tokyo Ghoul S (2019)
Video games
Tokyo Ghoul: Carnaval ∫ Color (2015); Tokyo Ghoul: Jail (2015); Tokyo Ghoul: Dark War (2016); Tokyo Ghoul: re Invoke (2017); Tokyo Ghoul: re Call to Exist (2019)
- icon

Tokyo Ghoul (Japanese: 東京喰種(トーキョーグール), Hepburn: Tōkyō Gūru) is a Japanese manga series written and illustrated by Sui Ishida. It was serialized in Shueisha's seinen manga magazine Weekly Young Jump from September 2011 to September 2014, with its chapters collected in 14 tankōbon volumes. The manga has been licensed for English release in North America by Viz Media.

The story is set in an alternate version of Tokyo where humans coexist with ghouls, beings who look like humans but can only survive by eating human flesh. Ken Kaneki is a college student who is transformed into a half-ghoul after an encounter with one of them. He must navigate the complex social and political dynamics between humans and ghouls while struggling to maintain his humanity.

A prequel, titled Tokyo Ghoul [Jack], ran online on Jump Live in 2013, with its chapters collected in a single tankōbon volume. A sequel, titled Tokyo Ghoul:re, was serialized in Weekly Young Jump from October 2014 to July 2018, its chapters were collected in 16 tankōbon volumes.

A 12-episode anime television series adaptation produced by Studio Pierrot, aired on Tokyo MX from July to September 2014. A 12-episode second season, titled Tokyo Ghoul √A (pronounced Tokyo Ghoul Root A), which follows an original story, aired from January to March 2015. A live-action film based on the manga was released in Japan in July 2017, with a sequel being released in July 2019. An anime adaptation based on the sequel manga, Tokyo Ghoul:re, aired for two seasons; the first from April to June 2018, and the second from October to December 2018.

By January 2021, Tokyo Ghoul had over 47 million copies in circulation worldwide, making it one of the best-selling manga series of all time.

== Synopsis ==
=== Setting ===
Tokyo Ghoul is set in an alternate reality where ghouls, creatures that look like normal people but can only survive by eating human flesh, live among the human population in secrecy, hiding their true nature in order to evade pursuit from the authorities. Ghouls have powers including enhanced strength, speed, endurance and regenerative abilities—a regular ghoul produces 4–7 times more kinetic energy in their muscles than a normal human; they also have several times the RC cells, a cell that flows like blood and can become solid instantly. A ghoul's skin is resistant to ordinary piercing weapons, and it has at least one special predatory organ called a Kagune (赫子), which it can manifest and use as a weapon during combat. Another distinctive trait of ghouls is that when they are excited or hungry, the color of their sclera in both eyes turns black and their irises red. This mutation is known as kakugan (赫眼; 'red eye').

A half-ghoul can either be born naturally as a ghoul and a human's offspring, or artificially created by transplanting some ghoul organs into a human. In both cases, a half-ghoul is usually much stronger than a pure-blood ghoul. In the case of a half-ghoul, only one of the eyes undergoes the "red eye" transformation. Natural born half-ghouls are very rare, and creating half-ghouls artificially initially has a low success rate. There is also the case of half-humans, hybrids of ghouls and humans that can feed like normal humans and lack a Kagune while possessing enhanced abilities, like increased reaction speeds, but shortened lifespans. Naturally born half-ghouls can also eat like normal humans or full ghouls.

=== Plot ===
The story follows Ken Kaneki, an 18-year old university student who barely survives a deadly encounter with Rize Kamishiro (his date who reveals herself as a ghoul and tries to eat him) when she gets hit by falling construction girders. He is taken to the hospital in critical condition. After recovering, Kaneki discovers that he underwent a surgery that transformed him into a half-ghoul. This was accomplished because some of Rize's organs were transferred into his body, and now, like normal ghouls, he must consume human flesh to survive. Ghouls who run a coffee shop called "Anteiku" (あんていく) take him in and teach him to deal with his new life as a half-ghoul. Some of his daily struggles include fitting into the ghoul society, as well as keeping his identity hidden from his human companions, especially from his best friend, Hideyoshi Nagachika.

The prequel series Tokyo Ghoul [Jack] follows the youths of Kishō Arima and Taishi Fura, two characters from the main series who become acquainted when they join forces to investigate the death of Taishi's friend at the hands of a ghoul, leading to Taishi eventually following Arima's path and joining the CCG (Commission of Counter Ghoul), the federal agency tasked into dealing with crimes related to ghouls as well.

The sequel series Tokyo Ghoul:re follows an amnesiac Kaneki under the new identity of Haise Sasaki (the result of horrific brain damage sustained from Kishō Arima). He is the mentor of a special team of CCG investigators called "Quinx Squad" that underwent a similar procedure to his, allowing them to obtain the special abilities of Ghouls in order to fight them but still being able to live as normal humans.

== Media ==
=== Manga ===
Written and illustrated by Sui Ishida, Tokyo Ghoul was serialized in Shueisha's seinen manga magazine Weekly Young Jump from September 8, 2011, to September 18, 2014. Shueisha collected its chapters in fourteen tankōbon volumes, released under the Young Jump Comics imprint, from February 17, 2012, to October 17, 2014. In North America, the manga was licensed for English release by Viz Media. The volumes were released from June 16, 2015, to August 15, 2017.

In 2013, a prequel spin-off manga titled Tokyo Ghoul [Jack] was released on Jump Live digital manga service. The story spans seven chapters and focuses on Kishō Arima and Taishi Fura twelve years before the events of Tokyo Ghoul. It was compiled into a tankōbon volume published digitally by Shueisha on October 18, 2013. It was licensed Viz Media and published digitally on September 26, 2017.

A full-color illustration book, titled Tokyo Ghoul Zakki, was released along with the final volume of the manga on October 17, 2014. It includes all promotional images, volume covers and unreleased concept art with commentary by Ishida.

A sequel manga series, titled Tokyo Ghoul:re, was serialized in Weekly Young Jump from October 16, 2014, to July 5, 2018. The series is set two years after the end of the original series and introduces a new set of characters. Shueisha collected its chapters in sixteen tankōbon volumes, released from December 19, 2014, to July 19, 2018. The manga was licensed by Viz Media, with the volumes released from October 17, 2017, to April 21, 2020.

=== Light novels ===
Four light novels have been released thus far and all are written by Shin Towada, with illustrations done by series creator Sui Ishida. On June 19, 2013, Tokyo Ghoul: Days (東京喰種トーキョーグール［日々］, Tōkyō Gūru［Hibi］) was released, Illustrations were done by the series creator Sui Ishida and written by Shin Towada and serves as sidestory/spin off that focuses on the daily lives of characters from the Tokyo Ghoul series. Tokyo Ghoul: Void (東京喰種トーキョーグール［空白］, Tōkyō Gūru［Kūhaku］) was released on June 19, 2014, and fills in the 6 month time gap between volumes 8 and 9 of the first series.

The third novel Tokyo Ghoul: Past (東京喰種トーキョーグール［昔日］, Tōkyō Gūru［Sekijitsu］) was released on December 19, 2014. Past takes place before the events of the main series and focuses on the further backstory of certain Tokyo Ghoul characters, including Touka Kirishima, Ayato Kirishima, and series protagonist Ken Kaneki. The fourth novel, Tokyo Ghoul:re: quest (東京喰種：re［quest］, Tōkyō Gūru:re: quest) was released on December 19, 2016. It takes place during the events of Tokyo Ghoul :re, focusing on the Quinx, CCG, and other characters.

=== Anime ===
A 12-episode anime television series adaptation by Studio Pierrot aired on Tokyo MX between July 4 and September 19, 2014. It also aired on TV Aichi, TVQ, TVO, AT-X, and Dlife. The opening theme song is "Unravel" by TK from Ling tosite Sigure and the ending theme is "The Saints" (聖者たち, Seijatachi) by People in the Box. A second season, titled Tokyo Ghoul √A (read as "Root A"), aired between January 9 and March 27, 2015. The opening theme song is "Munou" (無能, Munō; lit. 'Incompetence') by Österreich, while the ending theme is "Kisetsu wa Tsugitsugi Shinde Iku" (季節は次々死んでいく; lit. 'The Seasons Will Die Out, One After Another') by Amazarashi.

Funimation licensed the anime series in North America. On March 10, 2017, it was announced that the anime would air on Adult Swim's Saturday late-night action programming block Toonami, starting on March 25. Madman Entertainment announced that they had licensed the series in Australia and New Zealand, and simulcasted it on AnimeLab. Anime Limited licensed the series in the UK and Ireland, and later announced during MCM London Comic-Con that the series would be broadcast on Viceland UK.

An anime adaptation for Tokyo Ghoul:re was announced on October 5, 2017. Toshinori Watanabe replaced Shuhei Morita as the director, while Chūji Mikasano returned to write scripts. Studio Pierrot produced the animation, while Pierrot+ was credited for animation assistance. Atsuko Nakajima replaced Kazuhiro Miwa as the character designer. The opening theme of the first season is "Asphyxia" by Cö shu Nie and the ending theme is "Half" by Queen Bee. The series aired in two seasons of 12 episodes each, with the first season airing from April 3 to June 19, 2018, and the second season airing from October 9 to December 25 of that same year. The opening theme of the second season is "Katharsis" by TK from Ling tosite Sigure, and the ending theme of the second season is "Rakuen no Kimi" (楽園の君; lit. 'You of Paradise') by Österreich.

=== Video games ===
A video game titled Tokyo Ghoul: Carnaval Color by Bandai Namco Games was released in Japan for Android smartphones on February 6, 2015, and on February 9 for iOS. The player builds a team from a number of ghoul and investigator characters and explores a 3D map. Another video game titled Tokyo Ghoul: Jail for the PlayStation Vita console was released on October 1, 2015. It introduces a protagonist named Rio, who interacts with characters from the series. The game was developed by Bandai Namco Games as well and is categorized as an adventure RPG where players are able to explore Tokyo's 23 wards. The mobile game Tokyo Ghoul: Dark War, released in 2018, focuses on the conflict between ghouls and the CCG that terrorizes the city of Tokyo. A video game, titled Tokyo Ghoul: re Call to Exist, was released for the PlayStation 4 and Windows (via Steam) in November 2019. In March 2025, Behaviour Interactive announced a collaboration between the series and the Dead by Daylight video game, where Ken Kaneki would be added as a playable Killer character on April 2.

=== Live-action films ===
A live-action film based on the manga was released in Japan on July 29, 2017. Kentarō Hagiwara directed the film. The cast included Masataka Kubota for the role of protagonist Ken Kaneki and Fumika Shimizu for the role of Touka Kirishima. Yū Aoi was cast as Rize Kamishiro, Nobuyuki Suzuki played Kotaro Amon and Yo Oizumi played Kureo Mado. A sequel film titled Tokyo Ghoul S was released in Japan on July 19, 2019, with Maika Yamamoto replacing Fumika Shimizu as Touka Kirishima, and Shota Matsuda joining the cast as Shuu Tsukiyama.

=== Art exhibition ===
An art exhibition of the anime's tenth anniversary, titled Tokyo Ghoul EX., was held at Warehouse Terrada G1 Building in Tokyo from October 21 to December 1, 2024, and from December 14 to 29 at VS. Grand Green in Osaka.

== Reception ==
Tokyo Ghoul was nominated for the 38th Kodansha Manga Award in 2014. Tokyo Ghoul was chosen as one of the Best Manga at the Comic-Con International Best & Worst Manga of 2016. The Young Adult Library Services Association in the United States named the series one of its "Great Graphic Novels for Teens" and "Popular Paperbacks for Young Adults" in 2017. In 2018, it was nominated for the 30th Harvey Award for Best Manga. On TV Asahi's Manga Sōsenkyo 2021 poll, in which 150,000 people voted for their top 100 manga series, Tokyo Ghoul ranked 41st.

Tokyo Ghoul was the 27th best-selling manga series in Japan in 2013, with over 1.6 million estimated sales. By January 2014, the manga had sold around 2.6 million copies. It was the fourth best-selling manga series in Japan in 2014, with 6.9 million copies sold. The whole original series sold over 12 million copies. The sequel series, Tokyo Ghoul:re sold over 3.7 million copies in Japan during its debut year in 2015, and 4.3 million copies in 2016. It was the fifth best-selling manga series in 2017 with sales of over 5.3 million copies. It was the tenth best-selling manga series in 2018 with 3.2 million copies sold. Both series combined for over 24 million copies in circulation by June 2017, and they had 34 million copies in circulation worldwide by January 2018. By July 2018, both manga had 37 million in circulation. From December 2017 to December 2018, the franchise sold 2.3 billion yen, and was ranked at sixteenth place as one of the top-selling media franchises in Japan. By March 2019, both manga had 44 million copies in circulation. By January 2021, both manga had over 47 million copies in circulation.

On June 12, 2015, the Chinese Ministry of Culture listed Tokyo Ghoul √A among 38 anime and manga titles banned in China. In an academic article from the School of Marxism at Southwest Jiaotong University, it was argued that Tokyo Ghoul is representative of Japanese animation where characters turn evil, and such stories interfere with adolescents' moral values. In February 2021, it was reported that the series, along with Death Note and Inuyashiki, was banned from distribution on two unspecified websites in Russia. However, the Tokyo Ghoul series became unavailable for Russian audiences from March 2022 after Russia invaded its neighboring Ukraine. As a result, Sony, who distributes the series via Crunchyroll, has closed down its Wakanim and Crunchyroll EMEA services in the country, in line with global sanctions and boycotts. In the United States, the series was included in PEN America's Index of School Book Bans for the first time during the 2025–2026 school year.
