= Tokyo Ghoul (film) =

- Theatrical release poster
- Kanji: 東京喰種(トーキョーグール)
- Directed by: Kentarō Hagiwara
- Screenplay by: Ichirō Kusuno
- Based on: Tokyo Ghoul by Sui Ishida
- Produced by: Shōgo Ishizuka; Tomohiro Nagae
- Starring: Masataka Kubota; Fumika Shimizu; Yū Aoi; Nobuyuki Suzuki; Yo Oizumi
- Edited by: Akira Takeda; Yasuyuki Ōzeki
- Music by: Don Davis
- Production company: Geek Sight
- Distributed by: Shochiku
- Release date: July 29, 2017 (Japan)
- Running time: 120 minutes
- Country: Japan
- Languages: Japanese; English
- Box office: $10 million

Tokyo Ghoul (Japanese: 東京喰種(トーキョーグール), Hepburn: Tōkyō Gūru) is a 2017 Japanese dark fantasy action film based on the manga series Tokyo Ghoul by Sui Ishida. The film is directed by Kentarō Hagiwara and stars Masataka Kubota as Ken Kaneki and Fumika Shimizu as Tōka Kirishima. It was released in Japan by Shochiku on July 29, 2017.

== Plot ==
Tokyo Ghoul is set in an alternate reality where ghouls, individuals who can only survive by eating human flesh, live among the normal humans in secret, hiding their true nature to evade pursuit from the authorities.

Ken Kaneki, a normal college student who, after being taken to a hospital, discovers that he underwent a surgery that transformed him into a half-ghoul after being attacked by his date, Rize Kamishiro who reveals herself to be a ghoul. This was accomplished by transferring Rize's organs into his body, and now, like normal ghouls, he must consume human flesh to survive. Struggling with his new life as a half-ghoul, he must now adapt into the ghoul society, as well as keeping his identity hidden from his human companions.

== Cast ==
| Character | Actor | English Dubbing |
|---|---|---|
| Ken Kaneki | Masataka Kubota | Austin Tindle |
| Tōka Kirishima | Fumika Shimizu | Brina Palencia |
| Hideyoshi Nagachika | Kai Ogasawara | Clifford Chapin |
| Kōtarō Amon | Nobuyuki Suzuki | Mike McFarland |
| Hinami Fueguchi | Hiyori Sakurada | Lara Woodhull |
| Rize Kamishiro | Yū Aoi | Monica Rial |
| Kureo Mado | Yo Oizumi | Kenny Green |
| Yoshimura | Kunio Murai | Sean Hennigan |
| Nishiki Nishio | Shunya Shiraishi | Eric Vale |
| Ryōko Fueguchi | Shoko Aida | Colleen Clinkenbeard |
| Renji Yomo | Shuntarō Yanagi | Phil Parsons |
| Enji Koma | Kenta Hamano | Tyson Rinehart |
| Uta | Bandō Minosuke II | Aaron Roberts |
| Kaya Irimi | Nozomi Sasaki | Dawn M. Bennett |
| Yoriko Kosaka | Seika Furuhata | Jad Saxton |
| Hisashi Ogura | Dankan | Brian Mathis |

== Production ==
Principal photography lasted from July to September 2016.

== Release ==
On May 31, 2017, it was announced that Funimation have acquired the licensed of Tokyo Ghoul and will be coming to theaters soon. Tokyo Ghoul premiered in the US at Anime Expo 2017 in Los Angeles on July 3, 2017.

=== Home media ===
Funimation release the film on DVD and Blu-ray which included English Dubbed with voice actor Austin Tindle, Brina Palencia reprised their roles as Ken Kaneki and Touka Kirishima.

On home video, the film's DVD and Blu-ray releases have generated sales of $121,000 in the United States.

== Reception ==
=== Box office ===
The film grossed ¥1.1 billion ($10.02 million) in Japan. Overseas, it grossed US$71,222 in Australia and New Zealand, and $21,177 in Thailand, for a worldwide total of $10 million.

=== Critical reception ===
The review aggregator website Rotten Tomatoes reported that 82% of critics have given the film a positive review based on 17 reviews, with an average rating of 6.4/10.

Gabriella Ekens from Anime News Network was impressed by film's cinematography even though it didn't have a huge budget and praised Masataka Kubota and other cast for their strong performance. Although he criticized film for its Kagune effects. Mark Schilling of The Japan Times gave the film 4.5 out of 5 stars. Andrew Chan of the Film Critics Circle of Australia writes, "Tokyo Ghoul is one of those films where the over the top gore and violence ends up over shadowing everything from plot line to meaningful words or even its characters." Dread Central gave the film three and a half stars and called the film "A beautiful but flawed adaptation."

Variety said "This live-action adaptation of Sui Ishida's famous manga about flesh-eating monsters is likely to please fans, despite some technical imperfections." South China Morning Post found the film ambitious but felt it ultimately stumbled saying "The film collapses into a series of conventional stand-offs between opposing characters struggling as much with their own identities as their conflicts with each other. For about an hour, however, Tokyo Ghoul did offer something special." Film School Rejects said "It feels like a film designed for newcomers, but it ultimately fails to leave viewers hungry for more."

=== Accolades ===
Tokyo Ghoul won the Excellence Award in the Live-Action Theatrical Film category, and was nominated for the Best Award category in the VFX-Japan Awards 2018.

== Sequel ==
On September 22, 2018, it was announced that a sequel film for Tokyo Ghoul was green-lit for a 2019 release. On April 10, 2019, it was revealed that the title of the film would be Tokyo Ghoul S, and was scheduled for release on July 19, 2019. Maika Yamamoto will be replacing Fumika Shimizu in her role as Tōka Kirishima, and Shota Matsuda will join the cast as Shū Tsukiyama.
