= Kunio Murai =

Japanese actor and voice actor (born 1944)

- 村井 国夫
- Born: September 20, 1944 (age 81); Tianjin, China
- Citizenship: Japan
- Occupations: Actor, voice actor
- Years active: 1966-present
- Agent: Tom Project
- Spouse: Mikiko Otonashi

Kunio Murai (村井 國夫, Murai Kunio; born September 20, 1944) is a Chinese-born Japanese actor and voice actor. He is best known as the official Japanese dub voice of Harrison Ford, with Ford's personal approval.

== Filmography ==
=== Films ===
- Godzilla vs. Gigan (1972) (Takashi Shima)
- Submersion of Japan (1973) (Kataoka)
- The Battle of Port Arthur (1980) (Teisuke Oki)
- Shōsetsu Yoshida Gakkō (1983) (Takakichi Asō)
- The Return of Godzilla (1984) (Secretary Henmi)
- Godzilla, Mothra and King Ghidorah: Giant Monsters All-Out Attack (2001) (Masato Hinogaki)
- Tokyo Ghoul (2017) (Yoshimura)
- Kasane: Beauty and Fate (2018) (Yoshio Fujihara)
- Tokyo Ghoul S (2019) (Yoshimura)
- Old Narcissus (2023) (Mikio Tachikawa)
- Akashi (2025) - Grandfather

=== Television ===
- Mito Kōmon (1969) (Genjuro, Shichinosuke, etc.)
- Ten to Chi to (1969) (Kōsaka "Danjō" Masanobu)
- Haru no Sakamichi (1971) (Watanabe Kazuma)
- Daichūshingura (1971) (Ōno Gun'emon)
- Taiyō ni Hoero! (1972) (Nagasawa (ep. 8), Imai (ep. 101) and Satake (ep. 268))
- Key Hunter (1973)
- Edo o Kiru (1973) (Mukai Kurando)
- Katsu Kaishū (1974) (Enomoto Takeaki)
- Genroku Taiheiki (1975) (Hakura Itsuki)
- Ōedo Sōsamō (1975) (Izaburo)
- Fumō Chitai (1979) (Kaname Kaifu)
- Ōoka Echizen (1982) (Hashimoto)
- Tokugawa Ieyasu (1983) (Mizuno Nobumoto)
- Sanga Moyu (1984) (Orson Aikawa)
- Sanada Taiheiki (1985–86) (Ōtani Yoshitsugu)
- School Wars 2 (1990)
- Genroku Ryōran (1999) (Hotta Masatoshi)
- Seibu Keisatsu Special (2004) (Chief Cabinet Secretary Uryu)
- The Family Game (2013) (Yasuhiko)
- Nobunaga Concerto (2014) (Azai Hisamasa)
- Mikaiketsu Jiken: File. 05 (2016) (Hiro Hiyama)

=== Theater ===
- Fiddler on the Roof (1975-1977) Perchik
- The Boys in the Band (a.k.a. Midnight Party) (Hank)
- Les Misérables (1989-2001) (Inspector Javert)
- Kiss of the Spider Woman (1992) (Molina)
- The Sound of Music (1992) (Captain von Trapp)
- My Fair Lady (1993-1994) (Professor Henry Higgins)
- Hamlet (1998) (Claudius)
- Footloose (2001-2002) (Shaw Moore)
- Elisabeth (2004-2010) (Max)
- The Beggar's Opera (2006-2008) (Lockit)
- Me And My Girl (2006) (Sir John Tremayne)
- A Midsummer Night's Dream (2007) (Oberon)
- Copenhagen (2007) (Niels Bohr)
- The 25th Annual Putnam County Spelling Bee (2009) (Vice Principal Douglas Panch)
- Henry VI (2009) (Duke of Suffolk)
- Candide (2010) (Martin)
- Himitsu wa utau (2011) (Sir Hugo Latimer)
- Hamlet (2012-Claudius, 2017-Cornelius)
- Rudolf (2012) (Emperor Franz Joseph)
- The Count of Monte Cristo (2013-2014) (Faria)
- Sister Act (2014) (Monsignor Howard/Monsignor O'Hara)
- August: Osage County (2016) (Beverly Weston)
- Twilight (2018) (Norman Thayer Jr.)
- Little Women (2019) (Mr. Lawrence)
- Joseph and the Amazing Technicolor Dreamcoat (2020-2022) (Jacob)
- Waitress (2021) (Joe)

=== Theatrical animation ===
- Crayon Shin-chan: The Legend Called Buri Buri 3 Minutes Charge (2005) (Miraiman)
- Tensai Bakavon: Yomigaeru Flanders no Inu (2015) (Dante)

=== Dubbing ===
==== Live-action ====
- Harrison Ford
  - Star Wars Episode IV: A New Hope (1985 NTV edition) (Han Solo)
  - The Empire Strikes Back (1986 NTV edition) (Han Solo)
  - Raiders of the Lost Ark (Indiana Jones)
  - Return of the Jedi (1988 NTV edition) (Han Solo)
  - Indiana Jones and the Temple of Doom (Indiana Jones)
  - Indiana Jones and the Last Crusade (Indiana Jones)
  - The Young Indiana Jones Chronicles (Indiana Jones)
  - Air Force One (U.S. President James Marshall)
  - The Devil's Own (2000 NTV edition) (Sergeant Tom O'Meara)
  - Six Days Seven Nights (2001 Fuji TV edition) (Quinn Harris)
  - Random Hearts (2003 NTV edition) (Sergeant William 'Dutch' Van Den Broeck)
  - K-19: The Widowmaker (2006 TV Tokyo edition) (Alexei Vostrikov)
  - Indiana Jones and the Kingdom of the Crystal Skull (2023 NTV edition) (Indiana Jones)
  - Paranoia (Augustine "Jock" Goddard)
  - The Expendables 3 (Max Drummer)
  - Indiana Jones and the Dial of Destiny (Indiana Jones)
  - Captain America: Brave New World (Thaddeus "Thunderbolt" Ross / Red Hulk)
- Gérard Depardieu
  - The Count of Monte Cristo (Edmond Dantès)
  - Les Misérables (Jean Valjean)
  - Balzac: A Passionate Life (Honoré de Balzac)
- 500 Days of Summer (Narrator (Richard McGonagle))
- Angels & Demons (Richter (Stellan Skarsgård))
- Beauty and the Beast (Maurice (Kevin Kline))
- Edge of Darkness (Ronald Craven (Bob Peck))

== Awards and nominations ==
Year	Award	Work(s)	Result	Ref.
1992	47th Japan National Arts Festival for Theatre Award	Kiss of the Spider Woman	Won	
2006	32nd Kikuta Kazuo Theater Prize for Theater grand-prix	Elisabeth, Me and My Girl	Nominated	
2011	19th Yomiuri Theater Awards for Best Actor	Himitsu wa utau	Nominated	
2024	18th Seiyu Awards for Foreign Movie/Series Award	Dubbing roles for Harrison Ford	Won	
