= Enji (singer) =

Mongolian singer (born 1991)

- Born: Enkhjargal Erkhembayar; 8 May 1991 (age 34); Ulaanbaatar, Mongolia
- Genres: Jazz
- Occupations: Singer; songwriter
- Instrument: Vocals

Erkhembayar Enkhjargal (Mongolian: Эрхэмбаяр Энхжаргал; born 8 May 1991), known mononymously as Enji (Mongolian: Энжи) is a Mongolian jazz singer and songwriter.

== Biography ==
Enji learned the traditions of Mongolian folk song and folk dance in her childhood and later also the art of Urtin Duu, a throat singing that is more than a thousand years old. She completed a bachelor's degree in music education in Ulaanbaatar. In 2014, she was one of the first students at the Goethe Musiklabor Ulan Bator. There, Martin Zenker prepared her for her master's degree in jazz at the University of Music and Theatre Munich. Also in 2014, she appeared in jazz clubs in Ulaanbaatar and on Mongolian state television. In 2015, she attended her first concerts in Germany. In 2016 she and her band were invited to the Koktebel Jazz Festival in Crimea. Between 2018 and 2020, she completed a master's degree in jazz singing in Munich, where she graduated with top grades.

Enji's debut album Mongolian Song was released in 2018, which was followed in 2021 by the album Ursgal, mostly with her own compositions. Her "unique blend of jazz and folk with the traditions of Mongolian song" was highlighted on Deutschlandfunk. She became part of the young jazz scene in Munich, where she appeared as a guest singer and with pianists such as Sam Hylton and Vincent Eberle as well as with her own band in the relevant clubs. She toured South Korea on behalf of the Goethe-Institut, and in South Africa, she performed with Kevin Gibson and Andrew Lilley.

In July 2023, Enji released her third studio album, entitled Ulaan. In May 2025 Enji released her fourth studio album, entitled Sonor.

== Discography ==
- Mongolian Song (Enja 2018, with Johannes Enders, Paul Kirby, Martin Zenker, and Billy Hart)
- Ursgal (Squama 2021, with Paul Brändle, Munguntovch Tsolmonbayar, Moritz Stahl, and Alistair Duncan)
- Enji, Popp: 031921 5.24 5.53 (Squama 2022, EP)
- Ulaan (Squama 2023, with Joana Queiroz, Paul Brändle, Munguntovch Tsolmonbayar, Mariá Portugal, and Matthias Lindermayr)
- Sonor (Squama 2025)
