= Nobuyuki Suzuki =

Japanese actor

- 鈴木伸之
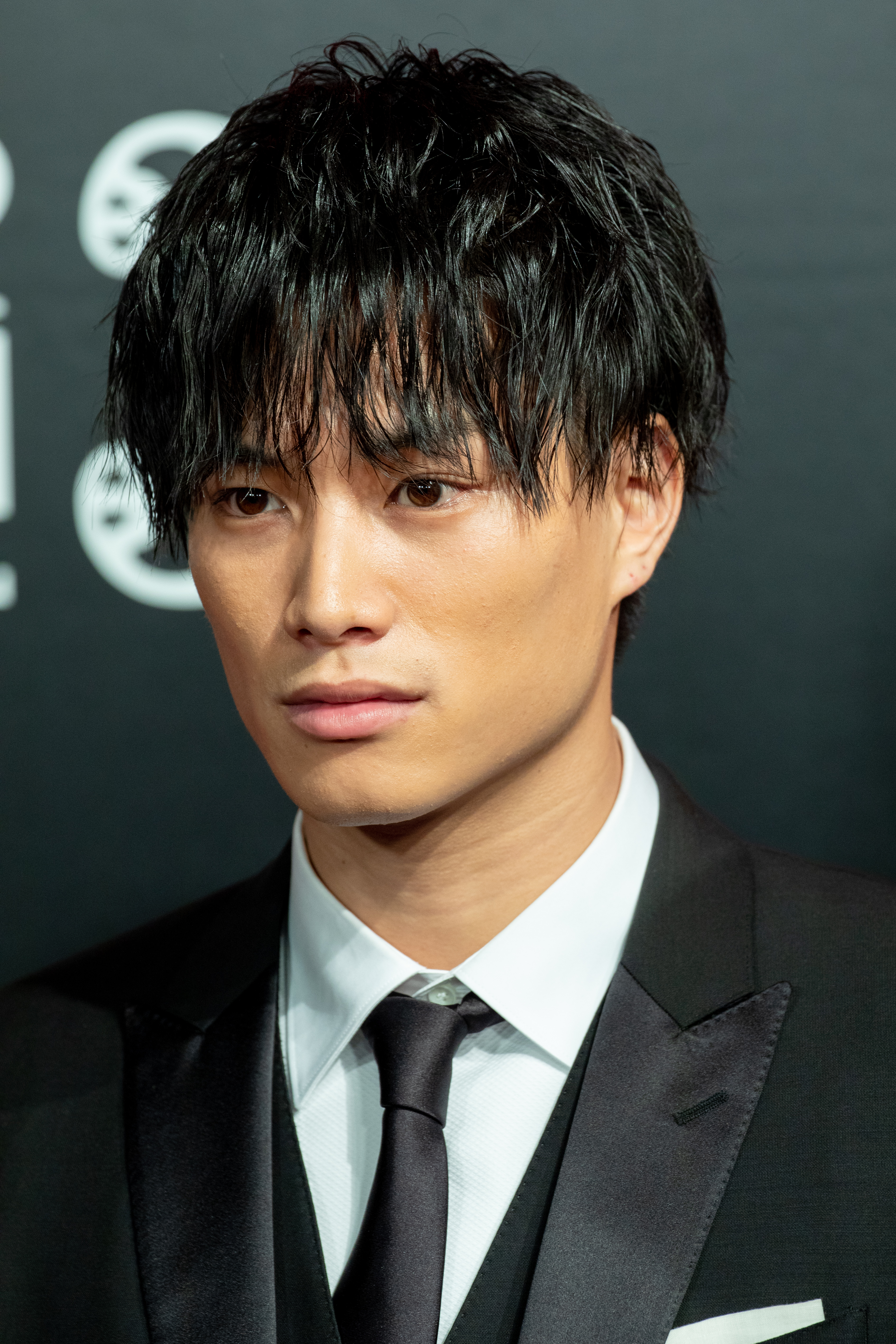
- Suzuki at the Tokyo International Film Festival in 2018
- Born: 14 October 1992 (age 34); Kanagawa Prefecture, Japan
- Other name: Nobu
- Occupation: Actor
- Years active: 2010–present
- Agent: LDH
- Height: 185 cm (6 ft 1 in)
- Website: www.ldh.co.jp

Nobuyuki Suzuki (鈴木伸之, Suzuki Nobuyuki; born 14 October 1992) is a Japanese actor and member of EXILE's theater company (Gekidan EXILE). He rose to fame by acting as a charming and handsome villain in several Japanese TV dramas and movies, such as Roosevelt Game, Water Polo Yankees, Wolf Girl and Black Prince and I love You Just a Little Bit.

Nobuyuki is represented by LDH.

== Career ==
Nobuyuki Suzuki was born on October 14, 1992, in the Kanagawa Prefecture of Japan, as the youngest of three brothers. He played baseball from the first grade of elementary school to the second grade of junior high school, but had to give up his path of becoming a professional player after breaking his elbow.

He participated at the VOCAL BATTLE AUDITION 2 held by LDH in February 2010 but failed. He was then scouted by the office and attended EXPG Tokyo School. In August of the same year, he passed the 3rd Gekidan EXILE Audition and started his career as an actor.

In 2013, he played his first leading role in the movie ARAGURE.

On August 6, 2016, it was announced that Nobuyuki would play the role of Kotaro Amon in the live-action adaptation of the popular manga Tokyo Ghoul, which was released on July 29, 2017.

On February 2, 2018, he released his first photo-book titled FACE.

On January 22, 2019, Nobuyuki and fellow Gekidan Exile member Masayasu Yagi set the Guinness World Record for "Most marshmallows caught with chopsticks in one minute (team of two)" with 43 marshmallows in one minute. However, this record was broken on March 20 by Americans Ashrita Furman and Bipin Larkin with a total number of 46 marshmallows. On February 14, Nobuyuki attended the PRINCE OF LEGEND PREMIUM LIVE SHOW, a fan-meeting with the whole Prince of Legend cast, at Yokohama Arena. During the event he performed a cover of A-ha's "Take On Me" together with Kazuma Kawamura, publicly showcasing his vocal abilities for the first time since his participation in the VOCAL BATTLE AUDITION 2 in 2010. On April 3, Fukuoka Softbank Hawks announced that Nobuyuki would throw the first pitch at the opening ceremony of Takagirl Day in TOKYO (vs. Orix Buffaloes) at Tokyo Dome on the 22nd of the same month. The speed of his pitch reached 122 km/h. Later on June 30, Nobuyuki and Masayasu set yet another Guinness World Record, this time for "Most marshmallows caught by mouth in one minute" with 53 marshmallows in total. On August 26, the stage play "Yusha no Tame ni Kane wa Naru / The Bell Rings for the Brave" was announced for 2020. This would be the first time that all nine members of Gekidan Exile appear in a play and are in charge of its production at the same time. When asked about a challenge he had recently faced during the announcement interview of the play, Nobuyuki revealed he had been studying English for the past 7 months, 4 hours a day, and that he would continue to do so for his own growth. On September 20, Nobuyuki participated as a guest in the Batman 80th Anniversary Shibuya Project Presentation held in Tokyo. There, he expressed his desire to advance to Hollywood at the age of 30 after having studied English intensely for 4 years and becoming fluent in the language. On October 16, 2019, he released a room-wear collection in collaboration with Japanese fashion brand PEACH JOHN. The clothes included are unisex and intended to be shared with your loved one.

On February 19, 2020, Nobuyuki released his second photo-book titled OVERSEAS. The shooting locations for this photo-book were Las Vegas and Los Angeles, symbolizing the actor's approach to his advancement to Hollywood which is his future dream.

== Filmography ==
=== Films ===
Year	Title	Role	Notes	Ref.
2012	The Kirishima Thing	Kosuke Kubo		
2013	ARAGURE	Seiya Himuro	Lead role	
2013	The Apology King ＜CASE 3＞	Erito		
2014	7 Days Report	Shugo Muto		
2014	ARAGURE II ROPPONGI v.s. SHIBUYA	Seiya Himuro	Lead role	
2015	Strayer's Chronicle	Sou		
2016	Wolf Girl and Black Prince	Nozomi Kamiya		
2016	Road to High & Low	Yamato Asahina		
2016	High & Low The Movie	Yamato Asahina		
2016	High & Low The Red Rain	Yamato Asahina		
2017	Tokyo Ghoul	Kotaro Amon		
2017	High&Low The Movie 2 / End of Sky	Yamato Asahina		
2017	High&Low The Movie 3 / Final Mission	Yamato Asahina		
2017	Revenge Girl	Toshiya Kadowaki	Lead role	
2018	CINEMA FIGHTERS -"Snowman"-	Roku	Short film	
2018	DTC -Yukemuri Junjou Hen- from HiGH & LOW	Yamato Asahina		
2018	jam	Tetsuo Kawasaki		
2019	Prince Of Legend	Takato Kyogoku		
2019	Tokidoki Momiji Iro	Yamato Nakajima	Lead role	
2019	Tokyo Ghoul S	Kotaro Amon		
2020	From Today, It's My Turn!! / Kyo Kara Ore Wa!! The Movie	Satoshi Katagiri		
2020	Kizoku Kourin: Prince of Legend	Takato Kyogoku		
2021	Brave: Gunjō Senki	Kōta Matsumoto		
2021	Tokyo Revengers	Masataka "Kiyomasa" Kiyomizu		
2022	Radiation House: The Movie	Shuntaro Tsujimura		
2025	Salaryman Kintaro Akatsuki-hen	Kintaro Yajima	Lead role	
2025	Salaryman Kintaro Sakigake-hen	Kintaro Yajima	Lead role	
2026	Mystery Arena	Gamble		
2026	Monster in Sheep's Clothing	Jun Igawa	Lead role	

=== Television dramas ===
Year	Title	Role	Notes	Ref.
2017	May I Blackmail You?	Kaoru Kyoda		
2017	Sleepless Pearl ~Mada Koishite mo Ii desu ka?~	Motoki Tokunaga		
2018	Half Blue Sky	Tooru Kanzaki	Asadora	
2018	From Today, It's My Turn!!	Satoshi Katagiri		
2018	Prince Of Legend	Takato Kyogoku	Lead role	
2019	Radiation House	Shuntaro Tsujimura		
2019	You and I on the G string	Yukihito Kase		
2020	Daddy is My Classmate	Shuntaro Tsujimura	Cameo	
2020	Cursed in Love	Itsuki Takatsuki		
2020	Danger-Less Detectives	Shin Takano	Lead role	
2020	Donna Bianca ~Keiji Uozumi Hisae~	Manabu Minegishi		
2021	Hitman in Love	Ryusei Yaotome		
2022	Kei x Yaku - Abunai Aibou	Ichiro	Lead role	
2022	Takahashi from the Bike Shop	Ryōhei Takahashi	Lead role	
2026	Song of the Samurai	Kondō Isami		

=== Web dramas ===
Year	Title	Role	Network	Ref.
2021	Boku no Satsui ga Koisuru Mae	Ryusei Yaotome	Hulu	
2021	JAM -the drama-	Tetsuo Kawasaki	Abema TV	

=== Stage ===
Year	Title
2010	GEKIDAN EXILE Hanagumi × Kazegumi Collaboration Show "Rokudenashi BLUES"
2011	12' ~12 Angry Men~
2011	GEKIDAN EXILE W-IMPACT Red Cliff -Ai-
2011	Reading play "Moshimo Kimi ga."
2012	Shida no Mure Junjou Junrei Hen
2013	GEKIDAN EXILE "Attack No.1" ＜Team B＞
2014	NTV 60th Anniversary Special Stage Play "Sanada 10 Braves"
2014	GEKIDAN EXILE "UTAHIME"
2014	GEKIDAN EXILE "Attack No.1" spin-off reading play "Mayuge Ichizoku no Inbou"
2016	Hounangumi presents reading play "Aitakute..."
2020	GEKIDAN EXILE "Yusha no Tame ni Kane wa Naru / The Bell Rings for the Brave"
2020	Reading drama BOOK ACT "Genin Kokan Nikki / Entertainer Exchange Diary "
2021	GEKIDAN EXILE "JAM -The Recital-"

=== Commercials ===
Year	Title	Ref.
2013	Sumitomo Life 2nd Commercial "Bokutachi no Fuyu - Koujou"	
2013	NTT Docomo "d fashion" Mens & Ladies	
2014	Ichikoshi Sightseeing	
2015	Youfuku no Aoyama "Aoyama Prestige Technology 4th Commercial" "Evolution of heat proof function"	
2017	Youfuku no Aoyama "In The Street"	
2018	Liberta "Dentiste"	
2019	Samsung Electronics "Samsung Galaxy S10"	
2019	Japan Tobacco Inc. "Omouta"	
2020	The Flower Cupid	
2021	Regina Clinic	
2021	ACOM	

=== Music Videos ===
Year	Artist	Title	Ref.
2011	Sandaime Jsoul Brothers	"Fighters" -Round 1-	
2016	Doberman Infinity	Do or Die	
2019	Sho Aoyagi	Home	

== Other work ==
=== Voice Acting ===
Year	Title	Role
2017	High & Low g-sword Animation DVD Special Edition	Yamato

=== Photobook ===
	Year	Title	Ref.
1st	2018	FACE	
2nd	2020	OVERSEAS	

=== Game ===
Year	Title	Role	Notes
2019	Prince Of Legend Love Royale	Takato Kyogoku	Released on March 25; Available on iOS / Android

=== Live ===
Year	Title
2016	High & Low The Live
2019	PRINCE OF LEGEND PREMIUM LIVE SHOW

== Awards ==
- BLOG of the year 2018, received on February 8, 2019
