= Sui Ishida =

Japanese manga artist

Sui Ishida 石田 スイ
- Born: December 28, 1986 (age 39) Fukuoka Prefecture, Japan
- Area: Manga artist
- Notable works: Tokyo Ghoul; Tokyo Ghoul:re; Choujin X

Sui Ishida (Japanese: 石田 スイ, Hepburn: Ishida Sui; born December 28, 1986) is a Japanese manga artist. He is popularly known for his dark fantasy manga series Tokyo Ghoul and Choujin X.

== Career history ==
Sui Ishida is best known for his dark fantasy series Tokyo Ghoul, a story about a young man named Ken Kaneki who gets transformed into a ghoul after encountering one. The series then ran from 2011 to 2014 in Shueisha's Weekly Young Jump magazine, and was later adapted into a light novel and anime series in 2014. The manga was also translated into English where it topped The New York Times Best Seller list in 2015. A prequel titled Tokyo Ghoul [Jack] was briefly serialized digitally on Jump Live in 2013. In 2014, he began a sequel titled Tokyo Ghoul:re. In 2017, a live-action adaptation of Tokyo Ghoul was released theatrically in Japan. In March 2018, an anime adaptation for Tokyo Ghoul:re began to air with a second season released in October 2018.

In 2016, Ishida created a 69-page storyboard of a manga chapter based on Yoshihiro Togashi's Hunter × Hunter series. Depicting the past of the character Hisoka, the storyboard was released digitally via Shonen Jump+ on June 2, 2016.

On May 10, 2021, Ishida started the manga series Choujin X on Shueisha's Tonari no Young Jump website.

== Works ==
=== Manga ===
Title	Year	Notes	Refs
Tokyo Ghoul	2011–2014	Serialized in Weekly Young Jump by Shueisha; Collected into 14 volumes	
Tokyo Ghoul [Jack]	2013	Serialized on Jump Live by Shueisha; Collected into 1 volume	
Tokyo Ghoul: Joker	2014	Serialized in Weekly Young Jump by Shueisha; Collected into 1 volume	
Tokyo Ghoul:re	2014–2018	Serialized in Weekly Young Jump by Shueisha; Collected into 16 volumes	
Untitled Hunter x Hunter story	2016	Published on Shōnen Jump+ by Shueisha; Name	
This Gorilla Will Die in 1 Day	2021	February 6, 2021 to February 7, 2021	
Choujin X	2021–present	Serialized in Tonari no Young Jump by Shueisha	

=== Light novels ===
Title	Year	Notes	Refs
Tokyo Ghoul	2013–2014	Artist; authored by Shin Towada; Published by Jump J Books; Published in 3 volumes	
Tokyo Ghoul:re[quest]	2016	Artist; authored by Shin Towada; Published by Jump J Books; Published in 1 volume	
JACKJEANNE-Summer Drama-	2021	Artist; authored by Shin Towada; Published by Jump J Books; Published in 1 volume	
JACKJEANNE Opera University and the Moon Signpost	2022	Artist; authored by Shin Towada; Published by Jump J Books; Published in 1 volume	
JACKJEANNE Seven Winds	2024	Artist; authored by Shin Towada; Published by Jump J Books; Published in 1 volume	

=== Video games ===
Title	Year	Notes	Refs
Jack Jeanne	2021	Video game published by BROCCOLI Co., Ltd. Original creator, original character designer, world designer, illustrator, and insert song lyricist.	

== Awards and nominations ==
Year	Award	Category	Work/Nominee	Result
2016	2nd Sugoi Japan Award	Best Manga Series	Tokyo Ghoul	2nd place
2018	30th Harvey Award	Best Manga Series	Tokyo Ghoul	Nominated
