= 東 =

東 (Simplified Chinese: 东), meaning "east", may refer to:

- Azuma (name), a Japanese surname and given name
- Dōng, a Chinese surname
- Dong (film), a 2006 Chinese documentary film

== See also ==
- Higashi-ku (disambiguation), for various districts in Japan
- Dong-gu (disambiguation), for various districts in South Korea
- 東山 (disambiguation) ("East Mountain")
- 東海 (disambiguation) ("East Sea")
