= East Hills =

East Hills may refer to:

Australia

- East Hills, New South Wales, a suburb of Sydney
  - Electoral district of East Hills, the corresponding seat in the New South Wales Legislative Assembly
  - East Hills Boys High School
  - East Hills Girls High School
  - East Hills Hostel
  - East Hills railway station on the East Hills railway line

United States

- East Hills (Idaho), a small mountain range that is a subrange of the Albion Mountains
- East Hills, New York, a village in Nassau County
- East Hills (Pittsburgh), Pennsylvania, the easternmost neighborhood in the city of Pittsburgh
- East Hills Mall, a shopping mall in St. Joseph, Missouri

== See also ==
- East Hill (disambiguation)
- 東山
