= Azuma (name) =

Azuma is both a Japanese surname and a masculine Japanese given name. Notable people with the name include:

== Surname ==
- Fukashi Azuma (東 不可止, born 1966), Japanese producer and director for TV Tokyo
- Kazuo Azuma (東 和男; born 1955), Japanese shogi player
- Kazuoki Azuma (吾妻 一興; born 1939), Japanese mathematician
- Kiyohiko Azuma (あずまきよひこ; born 1968), Japanese manga artist
- Hideo Azuma (吾妻 ひでお; 1950–2019), Japanese manga artist and father of lolicon manga
- Hiroki Azuma (critic) (東 浩紀; born 1971), Japanese cultural critic
- Hiroki Azuma (footballer) (東 博樹; born 1966), Japanese footballer
- Miyoko Azuma (東 美代子; born 1945), Japanese swimmer
- Ronald Azuma, American engineer
- Ryoko Azuma (東 良子; born 1973), Japanese military officer
- Ryotaro Azuma (東 龍太郎; 1893–1983), Japanese physician and bureaucrat who served as Governor of Tokyo
- Shiro Azuma (東 史郎; 1912–2006), Japanese soldier
- Takeshi Azuma (東 毅; born 1953), Japanese ice hockey player
- Yoshihiro Azuma (東 佳弘; born 1991), Japanese sprinter

== Given name ==
- Azuma Koshiishi (輿石 東; born 1936), Japanese politician
- Azuma Morisaki (森崎 東; 1927–2020), Japanese film director and screenwriter
- Azuma Yano (矢野 東; born 1977), Japanese golfer

== Fictional characters ==
- Kyo Azuma (東 京), a character in Inazuma Eleven
- Azuma, a high-ranking courtesan in Chikamatsu Monzaemon's 1718 play The Love Suicides at Amijima
- Jo Azuma (東 丈), a character in Genma Taisen
- Kazuma Azuma (東 和馬), a character in Yakitate!! Japan
- Soma Azuma, a character in Onmyou Taisenki
- Tetsuya Azuma, also known as Casshan or Casshern, the main and eponymous character of the Casshan franchise
- Midori Azuma (東 みどり), Tetsuya's mother from Casshan
- Kotaro Azuma (東 光太郎), a genius scientist from Casshan
- Azuma (Ghost in the Shell) (アズマ), a character in Ghost in the Shell: S.A.C. 2nd GIG
- Azuma, a member of the Grimoire Heart, and one of the Seven Kin of Purgatory in Fairy Tail
- Emily Azuma, a character in the webcomic Questionable Content
- Tokaku Azuma (東 兎角), one of the two main characters in the anime Riddle Story of Devil
- Azuma the Feldsher, a character in the video games Shadow Fight 3 and Shadow Fight Arena
- Manami Azuma, a character in Mousou Telepathy
- Jirou Azuma (我妻弐郎), the main character in Black Torch
- Azuma Genkaku (東 弦角), an antagonist in the manga Deadman Wonderland
