= List of Ronin Warriors episodes =

Ronin Warriors is a Japanese anime series and manga adaptation created by Hajime Yatate. The anime was produced and animated by Sunrise, and aired across Japan on Nagoya Television from April 30, 1988, to March 4, 1989, and has a total of 39 episodes. It was produced by Graz Entertainment and distributed by Cinar, and it was recorded by the Ocean Group. Ronin Warriors first aired on American television during the summer of 1995 and subsequently appeared through syndication, as well as the USA Network (1995), the Sci-Fi Channel (1996) and later on Cartoon Network (1999). From episodes 1-20, the opening theme is "Stardust Eyes" while the ending theme is "Faraway", both by Mariko Uranishi. From episodes 21–39, the opening theme is "Samurai Heart" while the ending is "Be Free", both by Hiroko Moriguchi.

Three OVA sequels were produced: Gaiden (Side Story), The Legend of the Inferno Armor, and Message, which combined contain 11 episodes. Gaiden would have "Stardust Eyes" and "Faraway" for its opening and closing theme for its first episode, and have "Samurai Heart" and "Be Free" for its second. Legend of the Inferno Armor would have "Stardust Eyes" for its opening theme and "Samurai Heart" as its closing theme for every episode. For Message, the opening theme is "Tsukamae Teite" and its solo on episode 5 is "Hoshi no Lullaby", both by Kaori Futenma.

The series was released on DVD in 2002, including the original Japanese version with English subtitles on the reverse side of the disc. On September 4, 2014, North American anime licensor Discotek Media announced their license of the original Japanese anime (Yoroiden Samurai Troopers), and planned to release the series on DVD in 2015. Discotek has said that on their Facebook page that they have no plans to release Ronin Warriors until they clear issues with the dub. Discotek has also licensed the OVAs and includes both Japanese and English audio as well as English subtitles. However, by 2021 the issues had been resolved and the series' English dub had a Blu-ray release on December 28, 2021.

== Episode list ==
No.	Ocean's dub title/Translated title Original Japanese title	Directed by	Written by	Storyboarded by	Original release date	English air date
1	"Shadowland" / "Target: Greater Tokyo"; Transliteration: "Nerawareta Daitōkyō" (Japanese: ねらわれた大東京)	Osamu Sekita	Jinzō Toriumi & Yuki Oonishi	Masashi Ikeda	April 30, 1988	June 26, 1995
Dark storm clouds descend on Toyama, which Násti Yagyu and her grandfather fear means the end of the world. Ryo, a young man accompanied by the tiger White Blaze, mysteriously appears in the street, nearly injuring a young boy named Jun as he is skateboarding. Believing that Ryo is one of the Ronin Warriors and that there is perhaps hope for the world, Násti leaves to meet him, but he is surrounded by police. The storm clouds move in, causing power to cut out; in the ensuing chaos, Jun is separated from his parents. Ryo and White Blaze fight a Dynasty soldier, and Jun is nearly killed before Násti saves him. Ryo and White Blaze are defeated, but another Ronin Warrior, Rowen, intervenes as the other Warriors, Cye, Sage, and Kento arrive. The Warriors summon their full armor and fight the soldier, but are unable to defeat him due to not working together as a team. The soldier takes Jun and Násti hostage, trapping them in a television screen where they feel the injuries he receives, and beats up Ryo until he calls upon his ultimate attack, "Flare Up Now", destroying the soldier but accidentally damaging a nearby building. Násti and Jun are freed, but the Dark Warlords and Arago, the leader of the Dynasty, introduce themselves as a giant castle appears in the sky.
2	"Glory for Anubis" / "Demon Commander! Shuten's Fierce Attack"; Transliteration: "Onimashō! Shuten no Mōkō" (Japanese: 鬼魔将!朱天の猛攻)	Mamoru Hamatsu	Jinzō Toriumi & Masanori Oka	Mamoru Hamatsu	May 7, 1988	June 27, 1995
Arago sends the Dark Warlord of Cruelty Anubis to eliminate the Ronin Warriors, targeting Násti as the Warriors will fight to protect her. The military unsuccessfully tries to launch an attack on Arago's castle, but the Dynasty turns their own weapons against them and destroys the attacking force. Anubis finds the Warriors, Násti, and Jun hiding in the subway and attacks. The Warriors use their armor to form the Circle of Power and protect Násti and Jun, but without their armors they are no match for Anubis, who traps them with his Quake With Fear attack. The Warriors are unable to dissolve the circle and call upon their armors, but the mystic Kháos appears and frees them with his staff. The Warriors summon their armor and Ryo and Anubis launch their most powerful attacks against each other at the same time, injuring Anubis and knocking one of Ryo's swords from his hands as he passes out. Realizing that the Circle of Power is unbroken and that he cannot allow the Warriors to face him, Arago sends a tornado of dark energy that scatters them to the most desolate regions on Earth.
3	"Secret of Wildfire" / "Armor Gear: The Secret of Rekka"; Transliteration: "Yoroi Gia, Rekka no Himitsu" (Japanese: 鎧擬亜、烈火の秘密)	Yoshitomo Yonetani	Saburo Ebinuma	Yoshitomo Yonetani	May 14, 1988	June 28, 1995
Násti and Jun find the sword that Ryo dropped, and White Blaze takes them towards the volcano where Arago dropped him; as Ryo awakens and begins to climb out of the volcano, Arago sends Anubis to destroy him for good. Anubis and the Dynasty soldiers pursue Násti and Jun, believing that they will lead them to Ryo. However, they are saved by Kháos, who uses his staff to open a giant chasm and eliminate the Dynasty soldiers, though Anubis emerges unharmed. The staff also restores power to the city, and, finding Násti's abandoned jeep, Násti and Jun leave to find Ryo. Anubis attacks Ryo, and though White Blaze returns his missing sword, Anubis knocks him back into the volcano. Though Ryo's power is increased, Anubis captures Násti and Jun, and Ryo is unable to approach them due to his armor being hot enough to burn him. Anubis casts them into the volcano to force Ryo to get rid of his armor to rescue them, but Ryo pulls Anubis in with him as the volcano begins to erupt. Ryo calls upon his armor and destroys Anubis' weapons before knocking Anubis into the eruption, but Anubis survives. Násti, Jun, Ryo, and White Blaze vow to find the remaining Warriors, who they believe are still alive, and Ryo accepts that they need to work as a team to defeat the Dynasty as Kháos watches from nearby.
4	"The Search Begins" / "The Trap of Poison Commander Nazha"; Transliteration: "Dokumashō Naaza no Wana" (Japanese: 毒魔将 那唖挫の罠)	Kunihisa Sugishima	Yūji Watanabe	Kunihisa Sugishima	May 21, 1988	June 29, 1995
Following Anubis' failure, Arago captures the people of the city and sends Sekhmet after the Ronin Warriors. At Násti's suggestion, she, Ryo, Jun, and White Blaze head to the university where her grandfather works to get his help in finding the other Ronin Warriors. On the way, the group stops by Jun's house to try to find his parents; though they do not find him, Jun vows to help the Warriors defeat Arago and save the world. At the university, the group tries to enlist the help of Násti's grandfather, but he refuses to help. Jun realizes that two suits of armor are two disguised Dynasty soldiers that attack. Ryo, with help from White Blaze and Jun, defeats the soldiers, but Dr. Yagyu is possessed by a Dynasty spirit and attacks. Ryo manages to free Dr. Yagyu, but he has been poisoned by the Dynasty and reveals that the Warriors have been returned to the places where their armor was created before dying. Násti tries to find the answer in his computer while Sekhmet watches nearby, planning to follow them and attack once they find their comrades. However, White Blaze detects Sekhmet and attacks him along with Ryo, but they are unable to defeat him. Násti realizes that her grandfather was referring to a poem he once taught her, which she finds on the computer before the university is destroyed. Jun notices that Sekhmet does not have six arms like it appears and is instead moving his arms fast, information that Ryo uses to defeat him. Following the information found in the riddle, the group heads to the Akiyoshidai Plataeu; unbeknownst to them, Sekhmet follows after them.
5	"Halo's Prison" / "The Warrior of Light Revives!"; Transliteration: "Fukkatsu! Hikari no Senshi" (Japanese: 復活!光の戦士)	Toshifumi Kawase	Hideki Sonoda	Toshifumi Kawase	May 28, 1988	June 30, 1995
On the road to the Akiyoshidai Plataeu, Násti explains that she believes Sage was sent to the caverns there, as the first verse of the poem led to Ryo while the next verse is "the light blossoms when in the darkest prison" and Sage is the Warrior of Light. They reach the Akiyoshidai Plataeu and Sekhmet attempts to kill Sage, but White Blaze senses his presence and alerts Ryo. Ryo discovers that his armor has grown more powerful since he awakened in the volcano and realizes that he grows stronger with each battle. Sekhmet blinds Ryo with his poison, but White Blaze saves him and they escape. Using his swords, Ryo tracks down Sage, who is imprisoned in rock, while Násti and Jun are captured by Sekhmet and Dynasty soldiers. Sekhmet attacks Ryo, who is no match for him without his sight, but Ryo manages to shatter Sage's prison. Sage emerges and defeats Sekhmet with his Thunder Bolt Cut; outside the caves, Sage heals Ryo's eyesight using his sword and the sun.
6	"The Counter Attack" / "Counterattack: The Furious Super Wave Crush"; Transliteration: "Hangeki, Ikari no Chōryūha" (Japanese: 反撃、怒りの超流破)	Susumu Ishizaki	Saburo Ebinuma	Yoshitomo Yonetani	June 11, 1988	July 3, 1995
The group discovers the next clue "Whirling water, sounding distant, calling you" and realize that Cye is probably in the Naruto Straight. Finding a whirlpool, the group splits up to find the Warriors: Násti and Sage head north to find Kento, with Arago sending Cale to do the same, while Ryo, White Blaze, and Jun stay to save Cye. Ryo battles Dynasty soldiers and summons his armor to defeat them, while White Blaze takes out two enemy archers. However, as Ryo heads underwater to find Cye, Sekhmet attacks and defeats Ryo, whose armor is affected by Sekhmet's poison, which is amplified by the water. Sekhmet attempts to finish Cye off before he can awaken, but is attacked by fish and a whale; though he kills them, Ryo's swords wake Cye. Cye rescues Ryo before returning to the water to continue the battle. As Cye is immune to his poison in the water, Sekhmet brings them to a nearby bridge and beats up Cye before Ryo is revived by Jun and White Blaze, who drag him into a fire. Cye and Ryo combine their Super Wave Smasher and Flare Up Now attacks to defeat Sekhmet. Seeing the power of their teamwork, they vow to find their friends and unite to defeat the Dynasty.
7	"Splitting the Stone" / "Enlightenment! Killer Lightning Slash"; Transliteration: "Kaigan! Hissatsu no Raikōzan" (Japanese: 開眼!必殺の雷光斬)	Osamu Sekita	Jinzo Toriumi	Osamu Sekita	June 18, 1988	July 4, 1995
Násti and Sage travel to Mount Daisetsu to find Kento, unknowingly followed by Cale. After they are forced to abandon Násti's jeep, Sage heads off on his own and orders Násti to return to the city, but she refuses and follows him. A snowstorm starts and Násti is attacked by a pack of wild wolves, but is saved by Sage. Cale tries to take them out with an avalanche, which sweeps away the wolves. Knowing that it is dangerous for Násti to leave, Sage allows Násti to come with him and they head to a giant rock called The Throne of the Gods. Násti believes that this is what the line of the poem "burning within a throne of rock" meant when it referred to Kento's location. Cale attacks them, and Sage tries to break the rock with his Thunder Bolt Cut while Cale attempts to kill Kento by thrusting his sword into the rock. Sage and Cale battle, but Sage is unable to defeat him and he and Násti fall over a cliff next to a waterfall, landing in a cave. While he is unconscious, Kháos appears to Sage and tells him that he needs to unlock the full power of his armor by achieving concentration of both mind and body. Násti decides to distract Cale while Sage rescues Kento and, upon reaching a cliff-top, calls Cale out. He does not appear, but she notices Kháos and, remembering how he previously aided them, wonders why he did not save Kento himself. However, he disappears as the snow starts up again. Cale captured Násti in a waterfall to draw Sage out; when this fails, he freezes the waterfall, but Sage emerges and saves Násti. With his full power unlocked, it restores life to the land and he successfully uses the Thunder Bolt Cut on the rock as the sword reaches Kento. It seems that Sage is too late, but Kento emerges from the rock and causes an explosion that blows Cale away. With Kento rescued, they head back to the city to reunite with the others and find Rowen.
8	"Friend or Foe" / "The Tactics of Illusion Commander Rajra"; Transliteration: "Genmashō, Rajura no Sakuryaku" (Japanese: 幻魔将、螺呪羅の策略)	Mamoru Hamatsu	Yuki Oonishi	Mamoru Hamatsu	June 25, 1988	July 5, 1995
Arago sends Dais to destroy the Ronin Warriors before they can locate and rescue Rowen. As they drive back to the city, Násti explains the poem to Sage and Kento, explaining that the last verse that will lead them to Rowen is "floating amongst the eyes of the ages, unmoored in the stream of the sky," but does not know what it means. At a temple, Ryo, Cye, Jun, and White Blaze wait for the others, but Jun is captured by Dais. Ryo and Cye battle him to save Jun and manage to free Jun, but he nearly falls to his death before White Blaze saves him. Dais defeats Ryo and Cye and claims he is holding Rowen captive, telling them to meet him in the city of Sandai to rescue him. Ryo and Cye head off to find Rowen, leaving Jun and White Blaze behind to let the others know what happened. At Sandai, Ryo and Cye find Rowen held captive by Dynasty soldiers, but "Rowen" is actually an illusion and that it is really Dais. Dais creates an illusion to manipulate Ryo and Cye into fighting each other, believing that they are fighting Dais, but they realize the truth after using their ultimate attacks on each other and knocking each other out. Dais prepares to finish them off, deciding to do the same to Sage and Kento after the others arrive. Sage sees through the illusion and drops his weapon, but Kento does not and attacks Sage. After the truth is revealed, Kento turns on Dais and uses his Iron Rock Crusher to drive him off. While the group recovers from their wounds, Ryo sees a shooting star and realizes that "unmoored in the stream of the sky" means that Rowen is in outer space, and Násti believes that he is right.
9	"Wildfire in the Sky" / "Rekka, Save the Sky"; Transliteration: "Rekka, Tenkū o Sukue" (Japanese: 烈火、天空をすくえ)	Susumu Ishizaki	Masanori Oka	Toshifumi Kawase	July 2, 1988	July 6, 1995
Now that they know where Rowen is, the Warriors try to figure out how to get to him before Arago destroys him. Násti proposes that two of the Warriors find out Arago's plan while the other two return to the city. When the Warriors get into an argument about who will go, Násti chooses Cye and Sage herself. However, that night, Ryo, Kento, and White Blaze sneak off to do the job themselves after telling Jun to tell Násti when she wakes up. Arago summons the Nether Spirits to deal with Rowen, which can combine their powers to create a massive supernatural construct called a Dark Matrix. As Kento and Ryo approach the building where the Dark Matrix is, Arago sends Dynasty soldiers to distract them. Though they easily defeat them, the Dark Matrix is launched, but Kháos intervenes and destroys it. Arago calls upon the spirits again to form another Matrix while sending Anubis to stop Ryo and Kento. They battle him, but knowing that they are running out of time, armor up and start climbing the building. However, the energy from the Dark Matrix strikes Anubis and powers him up; as he battles Ryo and Kento, their armor starts squeezing them to death. The Dark Matrix starts to launch and Ryo, seeing his only chance to save Rowen, jumps on it to ride it into space, but is absorbed by the Matrix. Kento meets up with the others and informs them of what happened, and they watch as the Dark Matrix launches into space.
10	"In the Sea of the Sky" / "The Gathering of the Five Warriors!"; Transliteration: "Shūketsu! Gonin no Senshi" (Japanese: 集結!5人の戦士)	Kunihisa Sugishima	Saburo Ebinuma	Kunihisa Sugishima	July 9, 1988	July 7, 1995
Ryo is alive inside the Dark Matrix, but his armor is absorbing the energy from it and slowly crushing him. Arago appears to the others and taunts them about the fact that Ryo and Rowen will die, sending his soldiers to face them. Anubis asks for a fair fight against Ryo, claiming it will not be victory, but Arago refuses to listen to him and sends him away, planning to use the power of the Nether Realm to destroy the Warriors. Inside the Dark Matrix, Ryo channels the energy his armor is absorbing and destroys the Dark Matrix from within with Flare Up Now. Seeing this from the ground, the other Warriors despair, but continue fighting. Ryo survives the explosion, but passes out and starts to drift out into space. However, Rowen wakes up and uses his bow to reel Ryo in, and they return to Earth. Sensing this, Anubis heads out to stop Ryo and Rowen, while Arago realizes that another power has awakened inside of Anubis. Rowen does not remember what happened, but before Ryo can explain, they are attacked by Anubis. Injured and weakened from the energy ball, Ryo fails to attack Anubis with Flare Up Now, and Anubis captures him and Rowen with Quake With Fear. However, Anubis hesitates to kill the helpless Ryo, with his desire for a fair fight conflicting with his Dynasty morals. Before he can decide, Rowen hits him with Arrow Shockwave, breaking his mask and helmet in half and revealing to a shocked Rowen that he is human. Anubis tries to attack Rowen again, but, with his loyalty faltering, is stopped by Arago and teleported back to his castle. The other Warriors, Násti, Jun, and White Blaze arrive and the Ronin Warriors are finally reunited. Seeing that he has failed to stop their reunion, Arago orders his castle gates sealed against the inevitable attack.
11	"Assault on the Dynasty" / "Break Down the Demon's Portal"; Transliteration: "Yōjamon o Uchiyabure" (Japanese: 妖邪門を打ち破れ)	Shinji Takamatsu	Hideki Sonoda	Shinji Takamatsu	July 16, 1988	July 10, 1995
Arago has his castle gates closed and the defenses activated as thick fog rolls over Toyama, which Násti reveals is part of the castle's defenses. The group comes to a bank of thick black fog that is also part of the defenses and is attacked by streams of energy, though they manage to escape. In the castle, Arago summons Dais to deal with the Warriors, and he convinces Arago to open the gates and let the Warriors in. He plans to lure them into a trap, as their armor will be easier to control inside the castle with the help of the Nether Spirits. Arago agrees, but warns Dais that he will be angry if he fails to stop the Warriors. The fog is lifted and the group can see the four gates to Arago's castle, but decide to leave Násti and Jun behind as it is too dangerous. Ryo refuses to listen to Jun's pleas to let him come and slaps him, causing Jun to run off as Násti follows him. Ryo sends White Blaze after them to protect them while he and the other Warriors enter the gates. Dais arrives and opens the gates, summoning the Nether Spirits. Unable to defeat Dais, the Warriors try to summon their armor, but the spirits block their powers and Dais easily defeats them. Násti finds Jun, who knows that Ryo never meant to hurt him and convinces her that they need to help the Warriors. The spirits attack them, but Kháos's staff appears and drives them away. Dais traps the Warriors and offers Ryo his life in exchange for serving Arago, but attempts to kill Ryo after he refuses. Before he can, Násti, Jun, and White Blaze arrive and Kháos's staff protects them and drives away the spirits. With the spirits gone, Ryo is able to summon his armor and blasts Dais away with Flare Up Now, destroying the castle gates. Arago promises that Ryo will fall and will not be able to defeat him. Ryo apologizes to Jun and thanks him and Násti for saving him. Násti points out that it was the staff that did it, causing the Warriors to realize that there is someone on their side trying to help them.
12	"Shallow Darkness" / "Seiji! Deadly Duel in the Darkness"; Transliteration: "Seiji! Kurayami no Shitō" (Japanese: セイジ!暗闇の死闘)	Takatsuna Senba	Yūji Watanabe	Yoshitomo Yonetani	July 23, 1988	July 11, 1995
The group advances through the city to make their way to Arago's castle and come across an abandoned store selling skateboards, which they realize is where they met for the first time. Jun leaves in search of find his parents and Násti follows, but an army of Dynasty soldiers attack the Warriors. The soldiers also go after Násti and Jun along with possessed cars, forcing the Warriors to split up. Sage realizes that his is the Dynasty's intention: to use Násti and Jun to split the Warriors up so they are weaker. Sage, Násti, and Jun escape the subway only to be confronted by Dynasty soldiers. Sage armors up and takes them out, but the Warriors are separated as they fight the soldiers. A building is brought down, forcing Sage, Jun, and Násti back into the subway, where they are confronted by Cale, who absorbs the light in the subway and Sage's light power. Sage is unable to unleash his Thunder Bolt Cut out of fear of hitting Násti and Jun, and Cale captures him with his Black Lightning Flash. The attack drains Sage of his energy and causes his armor to disappear, but before it can kill him, Jun attacks Cale with Kháos's staff. Jun is injured by an attack from Cale, but the staff frees Sage and restores his power along with the light in the subway. Sage calls upon his armor again and blasts Cale away with his Thunder Bolt Cut before apologizing to Jun, as he seen him as a burden. However, the Warriors are still scattered across the city, and Kháos's staff disappears.
13	"Fate of the Ronin Armor" / "The Armor Gear's True Form"; Transliteration: "Yoroi Gia no Shōtai" (Japanese: ヨロイギアの正体)	Toshifumi Kawase	Saburo Ebinuma	Toshifumi Kawase	July 30, 1988	July 12, 1995
Searching through the subway for the others, Kento and Rowen reunite. Kento is initially skeptical that it is really Rowen, but is convinced after Rowen makes a joke about how he found Kento by his growling stomach. Meanwhile, Arago addresses Cale, Dais, and Sekhmet, informing them that the Ronin armors are unbeatable together, but vulnerable when separated. He plans to use the Ronins' own strengths against them and assigns Dais to the task, though he does not tell him the plan. In the subway, Kento is anxious to get out, but Rowen cautions him that their job is to protect and rebuild and not destroy. Two subway trains come at them, separating them and throwing Kento into a field. There, he sees images of the Dark Warlords and Arago reveals that the field contains the bones of mortals who fell to the Ronin armor and that the Ronin armors and the Warlord armors have the same origin. He also reveals that the Ronin armors used to be worn by men that used them to conquer and that, as the people wearing them grow stronger the more they are used, so too grows the bloodlust. Arago believes that it will eventually bring the Warriors over to his side and that they will help him conquer everything. The other Warriors attack Kento and he defeats them, but it is revealed to be one of Dais' illusions. He and Arago try to convince Kento to join them, telling him that the armor contains evil and that its bloodthirsty nature will eventually overwhelm him and cause him to be the first to turn, as it is the most bloodthirsty of the armors. While fighting an illusion of an army, Kento feels the urge to kill, and the armor seems to take control of him as he fights Dais. After taunting Kento by attacking him in the guise of his friends, Dais causes Kento to hit him with Iron Rock Crusher. The attack shatters the illusion and blasts Dais away, but also causes destruction in the city, attracting Rowen to Kento's position. Arago speaks to Kento, telling him to look at the destruction he caused, which proved that it is all Kento will cause and that he will soon join his side. Rowen and Kento reunite, but Kento now has doubts about the nature of the armors. Arago congratulates Dais, telling him his plan is not over yet and that Anubis will handle the next part. Dais does not believe Anubis worthy, but Arago assures him that Anubis has changed.
14	"Armor of Life" / "Shuten, Fighting without a Heart"; Transliteration: "Shuten, Kokoro Naki Tatakai" (Japanese: シュテン、心なき戦い)	Susumu Ishizaki	Jinzo Toriumi	Takatsuna Senba	August 6, 1988	July 13, 1995
The Nether Spirits fortify the evil in Anubis' heart, as he had shown weakness when he previously battled Ryo and Rowen, and Arago sends him to enact the next phase of his plan. At an amusement park, Dynasty soldiers attack as Jun heads off with White Blaze to play. Sage battles them and is nearly beaten, but is saved by Ryo and Cye. Together, they defeat the Dynasty soldiers in the park and in a subway and decide that following the subway might lead them to Arago's castle. Rowen and Kento arrive, having followed the sounds of battle, but Kento displays doubts about his future. A powered-up Anubis arrives, but Kento's own doubts and Anubis being human increase Kento's fear of what he could become. This fear causes Kento to refuse to fight with his armor, and without him, the Warriors are defeated by Anubis' Quake With Fear. Kháos appears and tells the Warriors to trust their armor, as it responds to what is in their hearts. As Anubis prepares to finish Ryo off, Jun's courage causes Kento to summon his armor, as Jun taught him what real courage is. Kento hits Anubis with Iron Rock Crusher, knocking him out and driving the spirit's influence from his body. However, it leaves the Warriors wondering what it means for them that a human is wearing evil armor. Arago tries to pull Anubis back to his castle, but Kháos intervenes and pulls Anubis to him instead.
15	"The Ancient's Battle" / "Chaos, the Fated Battle"; Transliteration: "Kaosu, Shukumei no Taiketsu" (Japanese: カオス、宿命の対決)	Osamu Sekita	Yuki Oonishi	Osamu Sekita	August 13, 1988	July 14, 1995
The Ronin Warriors, Jun, and Násti meet with Kháos in a park. Kháos commends the Ronin Warriors for the good they have done so far and Násti for helping to bring the Warriors together. He confirms that the Ronin and Warlord armors share the same origin and that they can be used for good or evil. According to Kháos, Arago knows that the armors can be used to destroy him and seeks to bend the Warriors' armors to evil, being able to control the armor if goodness is not in the Ronins' hearts and souls. Anubis awakens, now understanding that Arago was using him for his armor, and Kháos explains that the nine armors were once one and formed out of human emotions. Anubis' virtue is Loyalty, which means he is loyal to whoever is his master. However, now free from Arago's control after over a thousand years, Anubis is free to pick his master and follow his own path. Realizing Anubis is lost to him, Arago sends the three Dark Warlords to attack Anubis and retrieve his armor, defeating him. However, before the Warlords can take Anubis to Arago, the Ronin Warriors hold off the Warlords. Arago blinds them temporarily with a bolt of energy, allowing the Warlords to escape with Anubis. The Warriors are more determined than ever to attack Arago's castle and defeat him, and Kháos agrees to become the bridge to the castle, but worries about the power of the Dark Side within. In the castle, Anubis is brought before Arago and imprisoned after unsuccessfully trying to convince the other Warlords of the truth. The Warlords ask for the power of the Dark Side to make them stronger so they can defeat the Warriors, but Arago reveals the source is pure evil and demands they prove themselves ready for the power. As the Warriors discuss the upcoming attack on the castle and Ryo's fears about what Kháos told them about their armor, Kháos summons Arago and does battle with him. Kháos is no match for Arago and is killed, but summons a bridge to Arago's castle from himself. As the Warriors prepare to assault Arago;s castle, he prepares for battle.
16	"Raid on Talpa's Castle" / "The Storming of Arago's Castle"; Transliteration: "Totsunyū, Arago-jō" (Japanese: 突入、アラゴ城)	Katsumi Minoguchi	Masanori Oka	Yoshitomo Yonetani	August 20, 1988	July 17, 1995
The Ronin Warriors, leaving behind Násti, Jun, and White Blaze, who wish them good luck, enter Kháos's bridge. Arago sends the Nether Spirits to destroy the bridge and the Warriors and collect their armor, but Kháos' spirit channels the bridge's energy and destroys the spirits. Upon arrival at the castle, Arago sends the Dark Warlords, now with increased power from the Nether Spirits, to attack the Warriors. Their attacks easily overpower the Warriors and the Warlords warn them not to go on or face destruction, but the Warriors decide to push on anyway. Entering the castle, they are separated and Sage is confronted by Cale, Ryo and Cye by Sekhmet, and Rowen and Kento by Dais. Cye and Kento go up against Sekhmet and Dais one on one to allow Ryo and Rowen to go confront Arago in search of answers. Arago explains that, as his Nether World grows bigger and feeds off the anger and hatred in humans, he needs the Earth, as the humans from Toyama allow him to create an unending army of Nether Spirits and Dynasty soldiers to take over the world. Ryo and Rowen attack Arago to no avail, and Ryo is blown outside the castle. Meanwhile, as the other Ronin fight their opponents, Anubis, still trapped in the castle dungeon, prepares to aid them.
17	"The Legend of the Armor" / "The Legend of the Armor Revealed"; Transliteration: "Akasareta Yoroi Densetsu" (Japanese: 明かされた鎧伝説)	Mamoru Hamatsu	Jinzo Toriumi	Mamoru Hamatsu	August 27, 1988 (Note: This episode was mistakenly re-aired on September 3, 1988, when episode 18 was scheduled to air. This resulted in all subsequent episodes being delayed a week, as well as the series being shortened from 40 episodes to 39.)	July 18, 1995
Ryo falls to a ledge and is nearly killed by Sekhmet, but is saved by Cye. Ryo climbs to the top of the castle and faces Arago again inside, but is defeated and thrown back outside. Meanwhile, Násti and Jun become determined to help the Ronin Warriors and advance through the castle on White Blaze. Arago watches the Warriors fight against the Warlords and, realizing that their armor grows stronger the more they battle, deciding he needs that power for himself. When the Warriors manage to get past the Warlords, Arago absorbs the Warlords to build a physical body for himself. Násti, Jun, and White Blaze find Ryo and come under attack by a Dynasty army, but are saved by Rowen and Cye, with Rowen destroying most of the army with Arrow Shockwave. Arago reveals that the armor originally belonged to him before Kháos stole it and tried to hide it from him. He attacks, injuring Ryo and causing his armor to disappear, and absorbing Rowen, Cye, and Kento. Meanwhile, Anubis escapes from his prison to help, saving Násti, Jun, and White Blaze. His presence causes the remaining Ronin virtues to activate and Ryo is healed. Sage attacks Arago, but his sword is destroyed and he is absorbed along with Anubis, leaving Arago having absorbed eight of the nine armors and Ryo alone to face him.
18	"Talpa's Triumph" / "The Terrifying Demon Emperor"; Transliteration: "Kyōfu no Yōja Teiō" (Japanese: 恐怖の妖邪帝王)	Kunihisa Sugishima	Saburo Ebinuma	Kunihisa Sugishima	September 10, 1988	July 19, 1995
Arago faces Ryo, taunting him about having absorbed his friends and causing Násti to lose hope, but not Jun. However, before he can harm or absorb Ryo, the other Warriors, who are still alive inside Arago, fight back and manage to force Arago to let Ryo go. Ryo becomes determined to find a way to free his friends and kill Arago, but is unsure how, as Arago grows stronger by feeding off the fear and suffering of the people he has captured. This gives Násti and Jun hope, as it means that Jun's parents and the other people Arago has captured are still alive. However, Ryo is reluctant to destroy Arago, as his attacks are ineffective and doing so would kill the Ronin Warriors. Ryo is nearly absorbed by Arago, but White Blaze saves him and they fight Arago, who forces the other Ronin Warriors to use their attacks against Ryo. Arago prepares to absorb Ryo, but the other Ronins take control of him and urge Ryo to use the opportunity to destroy Arago. However, he refuses, allowing Arago to regain control as he prepares to absorb Ryo.
19	"Wildfire's Fight Against Fate" / "Decisive Battle! Rekka vs. Arago"; Transliteration: "Kessen! Rekka Tai Arago" (Japanese: 決戦!烈火対アラゴ)	Susumu Ishizaki	Saburo Ebinuma	Katsuyoshi Yatabe	September 17, 1988	July 20, 1995
Ryo gives up hope despite Jun's pleas. However, Kháos' spirit appears to him to show him the origins of the armors and how Arago tried to take over the world in the past. Kháos had defeated and killed Arago, but Arago returned to the Nether World as a soul while vowing to one day return. With Arago's armor still intact and unable to destroy it, Kháos split the armor into the five Ronin and four Warlord armors to diffuse its power. Therefore, the nine armors are linked, but not necessarily to Arago's evil. While made up of the parts of the human spirit, the Ronins' armor are linked to the purest parts of it, while the other armors are more easily corruptible and eventually returned to Arago's side. While the armors can be used for either good or evil, it is the wearer's soul that determines this. Ryo is absorbed by Arago, who begins to destroy the city, and the spirit of Kháos apologizes to the Warriors for involving them in the battle against Arago. Arago attempts to cause Ryo despair by claiming his friends now hate and feel betrayed by him. However, Ryo refuses to give into despair and calls upon his friends to help him fight once more. Ryo emerges from Arago and absorbs the power of the other four armors to form a new armor, the Inferno Armor. Ryo destroys Arago with Flare Up Now, destroying him and his castle and freeing the Ronin Warriors. Násti, Jun, and White Blaze escape through Kháos's bridge and the group stands on a rooftop overlooking the now freed city, the threat over.
20	"Ronin vs. Saranbo" / "A New Battle"; Transliteration: "Arata naru Tatakai" (Japanese: 新たなる戦い)	Osamu Sekita	Jinzo Toriumi	Osamu Sekita	September 24, 1988	July 21, 1995
Awakening from a nightmare in which he is attacked and killed by Arago, Ryo watches as Cye and Kento practice their moves while they rest at a house on a lakeside. Meanwhile, Sage and Rowen visit the city where everything has returned to normal, with no one but them remembering what happened during Arago's reign of terror. Despite the peace, the Ronin Warriors worry about threats from other parts of the Dynasty than Arago and Ryo's new armor. At the gates to the Nether World, a new threat, Saranbo, appears, intending to destroy the world and steal the Ronin armors for himself to become invincible. Ryo finds Násti researching his armor, and she explains that her grandfather was aware of the armors' special powers and that the white armor he had summoned is called the Inferno Armor. However, she is worried about Ryo, as it takes a lot out of him to use the armor. A gate to the Nether World appears in front of Rowen and Sage and Saranbo attacks, demanding to know where the Inferno Armor is. They inform Cye, Kento, and Násti about this but not Ryo in order to protect him, as he is still exhausted from his fight with Arago and needs time to recover. They lure Saranbo into a trap, but he is unscathed by the combined power of Arrow Shockwave and Thunder Bolt Cut and easily defeats them. Upon learning that they do not possess the armor, he captures them and leaves in search of Ryo. Ryo and White Blaze leave in search of the others and, upon finding them, come under attack by Saranbo. Ryo loses until the Inferno Armor forms around him and he blasts Saranbo with Flare Up Now, apparently destroying him. However, Saranbo survives and learns that Ryo is the wielder of the Inferno armor. After the battle, Ryo who returns to his normal Wildfire armor and collapses.
21	"Ryo's Mega Armor" / "Shine, White Armor!"; Transliteration: "Kagayake Shiroki Yoroi!" (Japanese: 輝け白き鎧!)	Katsumi Minoguchi	Hideki Sonoda	Katsumi Minoguchi	October 1, 1988	July 24, 1995
Saranbo meets with the Dynasty soldiers to plan his next move in gaining the Inferno armor. Realizing that Ryo is weak and not using the full power of the armor, Saranbo decides to use this to his advantage. At Násti's house, as everyone else relaxes, Ryo is worried about the threat he knows is not over and eventually leaves. Násti follows Ryo and tries to comfort him, knowing he blames himself for his friends getting hurt, but he sends her away shortly before he is attacked by Dynasty soldiers. Ryo defeats the soldiers and Saranbo sends an image to confront him, telling him to gather his friends for a battle with him. Still feeling guilty over the others getting hurt, Ryo heads out to confront Saranbo alone at a pier, which Jun witnesses and informs the others of. At the pier, Ryo summons his armor and confronts Saranbo alone. Saranbo easily beats Ryo and starts draining him of his armor, but White Blaze saves him. Though Saranbo defeats White Blaze, the attack allows Ryo to get up and fire Flare Up Now at Saranbo, who returns with Wave of Destruction. Saranbo's attack overpowers Ryo's and Ryo is blasted into the water. Saranbo uses the Dark Flame to try to incinerate Ryo, but the other Ronin armors protect him from the flame at the expense of hurting their wearers. The other Ronins send their armors to Ryo, destroying the Dynasty soldiers and allowing Ryo to form the Inferno and destroy Saranbo with Flare Up Now. However, he collapses afterwards and his swords are damaged, unable to handle being used with the Inferno.
22	"Saber Stryke's Deadly Challenge" / "The Challenge of Kenbukyō"; Transliteration: "Kenbukyō no Chōsen" (Japanese: 剣舞卿の挑戦)	Mamoru Hamatsu & Kazuki Akane	Masanori Oka	Mamoru Hamatsu	October 15, 1988	July 25, 1995
Following Saranbo's defeat, Lord Saber Stryke appears with his tiger Black Blaze, glad that his old enemy has been defeated and also seeking the Inferno armor. As he is upset that he cannot trust his own swords, Jun suggests finding Ryo a new one. Násti looks through her grandfather's data and finds a special pair of swords meant for the original wearer of the Inferno armor called the Soul Swords of Fervor or the Soul Swords. According to legend, they are hidden at the base of a volcano and protected by a special divine power. Black Blaze appears and he and White Blaze fight; he eventually disappears, but the Warriors realize that he is from the Nether World and become determined to get the Swords of Fervor. The Warriors, Násti, Jun, and White Blaze travel to the location the Swords are supposed to be and find them in an energy triangle, which the Warriors dissipate with their armors power. However, Ryo realizes that they are fakes and Lord Saber Stryke appears, revealing to them that he possesses the real swords and challenging them to a fight for the swords. Lord Saber Stryke reveals that his old enemy is Arago, who he indicates is still alive and that he wishes for the Inferno armor to defeat him. Ryo launches Flare Up Now at Lord Saber Stryke, but his swords shatter and Lord Saber Stryke goes to kill him. However, White Blaze takes the blow for Ryo; honoring White Blaze's courage, Lord Saber Stryke leaves, but promises a rematch. White Blaze collapses from his wounds and the Warriors, Jun, and Násti rush to his side.
23	"White Blaze's Sacrifice" / "Byakuen Dies in Battle"; Transliteration: "Byakuen Shi o Kaketa Tatakai" (Japanese: 白炎死をかけた戦い)	Kunihisa Sugishima	Yuki Oonishi	Kunihisa Sugishima	October 22, 1988	July 26, 1995
Lord Saber Stryke locates the still-alive Arago and does battle with him, but proves unable to defeat him and is knocked into a chasm as Black Blaze goes after him. Meanwhile, Ryo, Násti, and Jun try to help White Blaze recover from his serious injuries while the other Ronins, unsure that they can trust Ryo in battle, decide to try to take on Lord Saber Stryke on their own. When Rowen suggests this to Ryo, he runs off, brooding over their destruction. Jun tries to cheer him up, but is interrupted by the arrival of Black Blaze with the Swords of Fervor and Lord Saber Stryke. Lord Saber Stryke challenges Ryo to a fair fight with the Inferno armor for the Soul Swords, but leaves after Ryo refuses. That night, White Blaze hears Black Blaze roaring and goes after him. The two tigers battle and, though White Blaze is mortally wounded, he manages to steal one of the Soul Swords and gives it to Ryo when he arrives, having woken up and found White Blaze gone. With the one Soul Sword in each of their possessions, Ryo agrees to a fight between him and Lord Saber Stryke, telling the other Ronins to stay out of it. Even with the Soul Sword, Ryo is no match for Lord Saber Stryke until he forms the Inferno. At the same time Lord Saber Stryke attacks him, Ryo uses the attack Rage of Inferno on him. Ryo emerges victorious with both Soul Swords while Lord Saber Stryke is mortally wounded. Both Lord Saber Stryke and White Blaze die, but Lord Saber Stryke orders Black Blaze to follow Ryo's orders as his new master and Black Blaze merges with White Blaze, reviving him.
24	"Sun Devil: Ambassador of Evil" / "The Demon Emperor's Emissary"; Transliteration: "Yōja Teiō no Shisha" (Japanese: 妖邪帝王の使者)	Susumu Ishizaki	Jinzo Toriumi & Masanori Oka	Kunihisa Sugishima	November 5, 1988	July 27, 1995
A Dynasty warrior arrives on Earth, landing in the volcano Mount Aso and causing it to erupt before the warlord uses black ice to calm it. Jun, Násti, White Blaze, and Ryo repair the Swords of Wildfire using the power of another volcano; as they head back, Ryo senses the warrior's presence nearby, though he dismisses it. On the ride home, Jun encourages Násti to race White Blaze, who now carries Black Blaze's power within him. At home, the Warriors see a news report about the eruption of Mount Aso and the ice that now covers it and decide to investigate. On the road, the warrior appears and Ryo engages in a battle with him, but proves to be no match for him, as he nearly kills Ryo before White Blaze knocks him away, knocking off his cloak. The warrior introduces himself as Sun Devil and explains that he was sent by his master to test their armors limits. Sun Devil splits into five copies which easily overpower the Warriors, but White Blaze attacks the one fighting Ryo and transforms into Black Blaze. At the others' insistence, Ryo forms the Inferno Armor though it will drain their power. Sun Devil explains he wanted to see the power of the Inferno and freezes the Ronins in black ice, but Ryo breaks free and destroys Sun Devil with Rage of Inferno and the Soul Swords. A gateway to the Nether Realm appears and Sun Devil's master speaks to the Ronins through it, revealing himself to be the still-alive Arago and determined to have the Ronin armor return to him.
25	"Torrent's Evil Twin" / "Confrontation! Two Suiko"; Transliteration: "Taiketsu! Futari no Suiko" (Japanese: 対決!二人の水滸)	Osamu Sekita	Saburo Ebinuma	Osamu Sekita	November 12, 1988	July 28, 1995
Wanting to redeem himself for his past failures, Sekhmet approaches Arago with a plan to defeat the Warriors and get their armor, creating an evil clone of Cye with the same armor, but red and more powerful. Arago is worried that they will be defeated again because of their reliance on the art of fighting battles, but Sekhmet is confident that he has accounted for that problem. Meanwhile, Ryo worries about being able to control the power of the Soul Swords and the Armor of Inferno while everyone else is worried that the Dynasty nearly overpowered them with its evil. That night, Ryo dreams that he tests his strength by using Flare Up Now to cut a boulder in half. Kháos's spirit appears to tell him that strength alone is not enough to defeat Arago and the forces of evil, as he must also fight the battle with his heart. He then appears in the dreams of the other Warriors to give them advice; the next day, Kento believes that they need to find their center to find the balance Kháos was talking about. Cye travels to the ocean, but is attacked by Dynasty soldiers and comes face to face with his evil clone, Red Torrent, forced to take the battle out of the water due to Red Torrent possessing Sekhmet's poison, which starts affecting the ocean. He is overpowered by Red Torrent's Super Wave Smasher until Kháos's spirit appears and tells Cye to ignore the turmoil and strength of his foe and find the peace in the battle. Cye realizes this is like how a whale lets a powerful current carry him. Kháos tells him not to fight, but to swim into the stream of its nature, and Cye clears his mind and searches for a solution. Red Torrent shoots his poisonous Super Wave Smasher, which Cye absorbs, using his armor to purify the water. Cye destroys Red Torrent with Super Wave Smasher, but a wave of poison emerges from his remains and Cye passes out after being overwhelmed by the attack. Sekhmet captures Cye, taking him through a gate to the Nether World.
26	"The Armor Must Be Destroyed" / "Kōrin, Bring Back the Light"; Transliteration: "Kōrin yo, Hikari o Torimodose" (Japanese: 光輪よ、光をとりもどせ)	Toshifumi Kawase	Yūji Watanabe	Katsumi Minoguchi	November 19, 1988	July 31, 1995
Kháos's spirit tells Sage to rely on mind, skill, and spirit and not just the strength of his armor to overcome evil, as harnessing these will allow him to attain even greater strength. Sage returns to the caves at the Catasota Gulch Pinnacles where the Armor of Halo was created and the source of its power. At the Pinnacles, Sage saves a deer from a pack of wolves, but the animals flee. Meanwhile, Arago summons Cale and sends him to go after Sage to try to turn him to the side of evil, believing that, once the Ronin Warriors see their true power, they will switch sides. Cale approaches Sage and explains that the animals ran from him because they sensed and fear the evil of his armor. Cale claims that the armors purpose is to bring destruction to the world and attacks. Cale battles Sage, trying to convince him of the armors evil power and for Sage to turn to evil, as the armor makes him continually fight and destroy. Fearing this may be true, Sage powers down his armor and runs, hiding in a waterfall and meditating. In order to show Sage how cold and dark the heart of a Dynasty warlord is, Cale covers everything, including all living creatures, in ice and snow, freezing Sage in the waterfall and trying to convince him to help destroy the world. In an attempt to drive Sage to evil, Cale revives and controls five deer and has them attack Sage, trying to force him to kill them and drive him further from good; when this fails, Cale kills them again. Sage summons his armor to fight Cale again, understanding that while his strength may come from the Dynasty, he still controls it with his mind. Sage unleashes the Thunder Bolt Cut, defeating Cale, but destroying the top of the caves. Cale tells Sage he has now become a Dynasty warrior before collapsing; not wanting to give into the evil in the armor, Sage separates it from him and cuts it in half with his sword. However, his sword channels the power of his spirit and repairs the armor; realizing that this is not an evil power, Sage regains faith in his mind, skill, and spirit to overcome evil. This causes life to be restored to the land; however, this leaves Sage vulnerable and Arago opens a gate to the Nether Realm and captures Sage and the Armor of Halo.
27	"Sand Blasted" / "Crush the Sand Demons, Furious Kongō"; Transliteration: "Ikare Kongō, Suna Yōja o Kudake" (Japanese: 怒れ金剛、砂妖邪をくだけ)	Katsuyoshi Yatabe	Hideki Sonoda	Mamoru Hamatsu	November 26, 1988	August 1, 1995
Having captured Cye and Sage, Arago sends Dais to capture another Ronin and Dais picks Kento. Dais reveals that he has a plan that Kento's brute strength will be no match against and asks for the help of the Twin Sand Strikers, which Arago agrees to as Dais has served him well in the past. While on his journey, Kento sleeps and remembers what Kháos's spirit told him in his dream: that while he is the strongest among the Ronin Warriors, one great force cannot ruin another and that he must use the spirit of the armor to push his way through the "sands of deception", telling him to know them and to "see what is not there." At a construction site, Kento is confronted by Dais, who he is shocked to see alive. However, Dais prevents the Sand Strikers from killing Kento, as he wants Kento to suffer and will be waiting for him on his quest. The three travel to a forest, which they petrify to await Kento's arrival. Kento arrives and battles Dais, unleashing Iron Rock Crusher and causing the area to turn into a desert. Dais reminds Kento how he once revealed to him that the stronger he gets, the stronger the hold of evil on him becomes, and that the world will end up just like it if he insists on fighting. Kento battles the Sand Strikers again, but when he unleashes Iron Rock Crusher once more, they absorb the power and defeat him. Kento awakens and, to confuse him, the Sand Strikers appear to clone themselves through their speed. Remembering what Kháos told him, Kento taps into the spirit of the armor, which he realizes is a part of the natural energy flowing through the Earth, and destroys the Sand Strikers with Iron Rock Crusher after locating them. Kento finally understands that, in order to use his armor's full strength, he must focus all of its power. Dais shows up again and attacks, but after he reveals that Cye and Sage have been captured, Kento willingly follows him to the Nether Realm to rescue them.
28	"Lady Kayura and the Dark Realm" / "The Mysterious Demon Lady, Kayura, Appears"; Transliteration: "Nazo no Onna Yōja Kayura Shutsugen" (Japanese: 謎の女妖邪カユラ出現)	Kunihisa Sugishima	Masanori Oka	Kunihisa Sugishima	December 3, 1988	August 2, 1995
Rowen practices his now-maximized powers by using Arrow Shockwave to successfully blast away storm clouds, but is blasted by an unseen force and pulled into the clouds. There, he is confronted by a beautiful girl named Lady Kayura, who reveals that she is loyal to the Dynasty and that Cye, Sage, and Kento have been captured. His attacks prove to be ineffective against her, and she leaves to go after Ryo but says that she will be back for him. Rowen heads out to help Ryo while who appears to be Kháos watches him. At a volcano, Ryo tests out his power and pledges to protect the world and defeat Arago. He is confronted by Lady Kayura, who produces Cye and Sage's weapons and leaves them for Rowen and Ryo, causing them to realize that she is telling the truth and become determined to save their friends. They return to Násti's house, where they argue over the next course of action until a vision appears of Arago's castle and their friends being tortured. Lady Kayura appears and tries to convince them to come with her, but they instead armor up to face her. Even together, Ryo and Rowen are unable to defeat Lady Kayura, with Flare Up Now being blocked. Lady Kayura defeats them with Star Sword Scream and summons a gate to the Nether Realm to capture them, but Kháos tosses his staff down and it and Rowen's armor give Ryo the power to summon the Inferno Armor. Ryo unleashes Rage of Inferno, destroying the gate and forcing Lady Kayura to flee. He and Rowen realize that Kháos is still around and helping them, even in spirit.
29	"Anubis Is Reborn" / "Go! Two Warriors..."; Transliteration: "Yuke! Futari no Senshitachi yo..." (Japanese: 行け!二人の戦士達よ…)	Susumu Ishizaki	Jinzo Toriumi	Toshifumi Kawase	December 10, 1988	August 3, 1995
Lady Kayura confronts Kháos at a temple, but he blocks her attacks and disappears, causing her to realize that she must report his return to Arago. Kháos travels to a waterfall, where it is revealed that he is not actually Kháos, but someone who has taken on his role and his way of doing things. Ryo is determined to get into the Nether Realm and rescue his friends, Rowen joining him despite Násti and Rowen's warnings that it is a trap. Lady Kayura reports on the fake Kháos to Arago and her belief that it is merely someone who is able to wield his staff, but Arago tells her to ignore him and focus on capturing Ryo and Rowen. As Ryo, Rowen, Násti, Jun, and White Blaze prepare to travel into the city to find a way into the Nether Realm, the fake Kháos appears and reveals himself to be Anubis, the former Warlord of Cruelty. Anubis explains that he is now following the path of Kháos and his power, but warns that he cannot protect the Warriors from everything and that they must be careful of the traps of the Nether Realm. While Anubis does not agree with what they are doing, he does agree to help in any way he can before leaving. In the city, they come under attack from Lady Kayura, but prove no match for her even with their armor. Lady Kayura turns the ground into quicksand to capture them, but Anubis appears and frees them before opening a portal to the Nether Realm. Lady Kayura promises to get them next time, while Násti and Jun hope that they succeed and return safely.
30	"Talpa Turns the Tide" / "The Demon World Is Here?"; Transliteration: "Koko wa Yōjakai ka?" (Japanese: ここは妖邪界か?)	Kazuki Akane	Yuki Oonishi	Kazuki Akane	December 17, 1988	August 4, 1995
As the city has been damaged by Lady Kayura's attack, Anubis appears and pledges to help the Warriors stop Arago or die trying. Násti and Jun fear him due to his past actions, but he convinces them of his sincerity and they invite him to stay with him after accepting him as a friend. Anubis explains to them how, four hundred years ago, he was a warrior who had joined Arago after becoming power-hungry and bloodthirsty. However, Kháos showed him that that was not a good thing and that Arago was not his destiny as he thought, and he now realizes that his destiny is to stop Arago. Anubis senses the presence of Dais and forces him to show himself, and he claims that all of the Ronin Warriors have been captured by Arago, However, Anubis points out that Ryo and Rowen are still free, and Dais explains that they are merely being toyed with by Arago and attacks Anubis, who easily defeats him, knocking his helmet off and revealing his face to Jun and Násti. Anubis refuses to kill him, saying that Dais' armor protects him and tries to convince Dais that the armor's power does not come from Arago like he believes, but that Arago wants it for himself before he, Jun, and Násti leave. In the Nether World, Ryo meets up with Rowen and White Blaze and a gate appears in front of them which they travel through. There, they are met by a Nether Spirit who claims that Cye, Sage and Kento are merely guests of Arago and asks them to join them, but must give up their armor first. However, they know that the spirit is lying and refuse and the spirit leaves as Arago's castle appears nearby. Arago visits the captured Warriors, who are being drained by Nether Spirits, and creates a sword from their armors' power to defeat Ryo and Rowen with. Arago then sends Lady Kayura to give the sword to the Dynasty warlord Dala to use against Ryo and Rowen and capture them. However, upon returning to her room, Lady Kayura is visited by Arago and begins to doubt if what she is doing is right. As Ryo, Rowen, and White Blaze make their way to the castle, they are surrounded by a massive army of Dynasty soldiers and are left fighting what looks like a hopeless battle.
31	"Legend of the White Armor" / "The Legendary Armor, Kikōtei"; Transliteration: "Densetsu no Yoroi, Kikōtei" (Japanese: 伝説の鎧、輝煌帝)	Toshifumi Kawase	Saburo Ebinuma	Tobishima Kyousaku	December 24, 1988	August 7, 1995
Ryo and Rowen battle the army and eventually manage to escape it, but are confronted by Dala, who reveals the origin of his sword, which is able to easily deflect Ryo's. Meanwhile, the Dark Warlords worry about being confronted by Ryo and Rowen with the power of the Inferno Armor and beg Arago to destroy them and end it. Arago summons Badamon, Lord of the Nether Spirits, to explain the story behind the Inferno. Badamon explains that it came to be when the world was plagued by evil a long time ago. The five Ronin armors combined together to form the Inferno, which was worn by the first Ronin Warrior, Hariel. Ryo and Rowen continue battling Dala, who taunts them about the fact that Ryo refuses to summon the Inferno to fight because it might drain their friends of the last of their energy and kill them. Badamon continues his explanation, telling the Warlords that the Inferno defeated the evil force plaguing the world long ago and that what they have seen is just the beginning of the Inferno's power. Nothing can stop it, and even he does not know its full power, but it is rumored that at full power it could destroy the world and leave behind a void. Arago explains that he wants to conquer the armor for that purpose and build a new world under his control, but Badamon plans to control the armor. Rowen leaves, leaving Ryo to battle Dala on his own while refusing to summon the Inferno. With the power of the three armors in his sword, Dala is able to use Cye, Kento, and Sage's attacks against Ryo. Badamon explains to the Warlords that he and his spirits can control the Inferno Armor where the Warlords would be destroyed and he has take control of the armor. Rowen frees the Warriors from their prison with his Arrow Shockwave and they send their armor power to Ryo, who forms the Inferno. Ryo destroys Dala and his sword with Rage of Inferno and, in his normal armor, helps Rowen defeat the Dynasty soldiers. They then continue their journey, while Badamon and his Nether Spirits prepare to take over the Inferno Armor.
32	"Strategies of the Nether World" / "Spirits of Earth, a Terrifying Plan"; Transliteration: "Chireishū, Kyōfu no Sakusen" (Japanese: 地霊衆、恐怖の作戦)	Osamu Sekita	Masanori Oka	Osamu Sekita	January 14, 1989 (Note: This episode was delayed a week due to coverage of the death of Emperor Hirohito on its originally scheduled air date of January 7, 1989.)	August 8, 1995
Badamon harnesses the power of the Nether Spirits to observe events of the past where Ryo summoned the Armor of Inferno in order to find an alternate way to summon it without the five main armors and control it, taking notice of how the armor was activated solely with one of the four and Khaos' staff. Meanwhile, Ryo and Rowen make their way through a maze to Arago's castle. Badamon reports to Arago a plan to summon the Inferno armor and take control of it: transfer the power of the three Dark Warlords' armors to Ryo, which would overwhelm him and cause him to be under their control, making him summon the Inferno. Arago agrees, but tells Badamon not to tell the Dark Warlords, as they may betray them if they realize they are being used. Badamon requests for Lady Kayura's aid and gives her magic sand, called "Kousa", he created that will allow her to control Ryo. Ryo and Rowen try to make their way to Arago's castle undetected, but are found and confronted by the Dark Warlords and Dynasty soldiers. They defeat the soldiers and escape, but are confronted by Lady Kayura, who uses the sand on the three Warlords, Ryo, Rowen, and White Blaze. She forces Ryo to summon the Inferno armor using the power of Rowen and the Dark Warlords' armors with the Nether Spirits and the sand to control him. However, instead of the Inferno being controlled by the Dark Warlords' armors, it works in reverse, controlling them and making them attack Lady Kayura. However, they are no match for her and she easily defeats them since their powers were given to Ryo. She wakes Ryo, but he drives the Nether Spirits and sand's influence from his body and battles Lady Kayura. Ryo uses Rage of Inferno while Lady Kayura uses Star Sword Scream, but she retreats after Ryo destroys her sword and the nearby area. However, Arago is pleased, as the Inferno Armor holds powers that even he was unaware of. Ryo reunites with Rowen and White Blaze to continue their quest.
33	"In Search of Secret Treasures" / "Search for the Mysterious Treasure"; Transliteration: "Nazo no Hihō o Motomete" (Japanese: 謎の秘宝を求めて)	Kunihisa Sugishima	Jinzo Toriumi & Masanori Oka	Katsuyoshi Yatabe	January 21, 1989	August 9, 1995
The clash between Ryo and Lady Kayura creates destruction in the mortal world and the Nether World. Ryo, exhausted and in pain from the battle, and Rowen rest and discuss how Ryo did not feel any different after absorbing the power of the Dark Warlords. This leads Rowen to theorize that they may not all be evil, as they briefly protected Ryo from Lady Kayura. While Lady Kayura lost against Ryo, Arago is pleased with her, as the Armor of Inferno was proven to have the power to destroy the mortal world like he wants. Jun, Násti, and Anubis look through Násti's grandfather's data and Anubis spots a symbol that Arago uses, and Násti discovers that the symbol stands for the Jewel of Life, an object capable of destroying Arago which was hidden by the first Ancients. After the discovery, Anubis senses something and, while investigating, comes under attack from Dynasty soldiers. Anubis fights them and they alert Badamon of Násti's discovery. Badamon orders the soldiers not to let Násti, Jun, and Anubis escape with the information and has two soldiers lure Anubis away while another tries to kill Násti and Jun. Anubis defeats the soldiers and Násti locates a map leading to the Jewel of Life which Anubis realizes is near water. Meanwhile, Ryo and Rowen contemplate how the Dark Warlords almost seemed to turn good and worry about their friends. Needing to stop Anubis, Násti, and Jun from finding the Jewel, Badamon dispatches the Dynasty warrior Kashura to stop them, explaining that legend says that the Jewel is the heart of the nine armors. It beats strong in the heart of the pure and gives strength to the weak, and thus is a threat to Arago and his empire. Násti uncovers the same thing, reading that the Jewel gives the armors their power and along with Anubis figures out that it must be in Jewel Lake. The three head there, with Anubis planning to travel to the Nether World afterwards to help the Ronin Warriors, but refusing to allow Jun and Násti to come as it is too dangerous. At Jewel Lake, Anubis parts the water with Kháos's staff and opens the tomb at the bottom. In the tomb, they find the armors of the Ancients that guard the tomb, murals of the battles between Hariel and evil in the past, and the Jewel of Life. When Jun picks up the Jewel, Kháos speaks to them, telling them that only the pure of heart can use the Jewel as in evil hands it could destroy the world. Kashura arrives with Dynasty soldiers and attacks, but the Ancient armors, possessed by the souls of their wearers, destroy the soldiers. When Kashura threatens Násti and Jun, Anubis stabs him through the back with Kháos's staff, killing him. At Kháos's request, Anubis releases the souls in the armors, allowing them to move on now that their job is finished. He then puts the Jewel around Násti's neck when Jun gives it to him, saying that Jun and Násti are the people purest of heart he knows and they will save their friends together.
34	"Strata's Defiant Stand" / "Tenkū's Battle of Wounds"; Transliteration: "Tenkū, Kizudarake no Tatakai" (Japanese: 天空、傷だらけの戦い)	Susumu Ishizaki	Masanori Oka & Yuki Oonishi	Asuka Keisaku	January 28, 1989	August 10, 1995
Anubis, Násti, and Jun contemplate the power of the Jewel of Life and wonder how it is supposed to defeat Arago, as Násti gives it to Jun to wear. As Dynasty soldiers cause havoc and destruction in the city, Badamon approaches Arago, fearing allowing Ryo and Rowen free rein within the castle. Meanwhile, a structure the Nether Spirits are building, which Badamon calls the Tower of Pain, is completed with the power of the Inferno Armor, but Arago assures him that they will not be free for long as he is drawing them into a trap. At Násti's home, Anubis contemplates the war with the Dynasty and looks for a sign from Kháos when it will be time for him to complete his destiny when Kháos's staff and the Jewel of Life suddenly glow, causing snow. Ryo and Rowen make their way through the maze, avoiding Dynasty soldiers and trying to find a way into the castle, but end up trapped in the dungeon. Upon escaping, they are confronted by Lady Kayura, who tricks Ryo into using Flare Up Now, draining his armor of power. The effects are seen in the mortal world as Arago's castle flickers in and out of view, causing Anubis to say that the Dynasty is rising again. While wondering what to do, the staff and the Jewel of Life glow again and Anubis finally understands what he has to do to help the others. Rowen holds off Lady Kayura while sending White Blaze to carry an unconscious Ryo to safety. Rowen battles Lady Kayura but is no match for her until Anubis aids them. During his fight with Lady Kayura, Rowen spots White Blaze carry Ryo and protects them, but is defeated. However, as Anubis, Násti, and Jun approach, the power of the Jewel of Life causes a water spout that knocks Lady Kayura off the barge and forces her back ashore. Násti, Jun, and Anubis land on the barge and reunite with Ryo and Rowen, who are re-energized by the Jewel's power.
35	"The Warriors Return" / "Rise Again, Armored Warriors..."; Transliteration: "Yomigaere, Gaisenshitachi yo..." (Japanese: よみがえれ、鎧戦士達よ…)	Kazuki Akane	Saburo Ebinuma	Kazuki Akane	February 4, 1989	August 11, 1995
The group is confronted by Lady Kayura and Dynasty soldiers and Ryo and Rowen fight them, having no luck against Lady Kayura. Meanwhile, Arago speaks with Badamon, who has prepared altars for the nine armors and has been having his Nether Spirits "purify" the bodies of the Dark Warlords, who he only sees as useful tools. Realizing they need the other Ronin Warriors to win, Rowen sacrifices himself to buy them time, but is defeated and seemingly killed. Ryo prepares to continue the battle with Lady Kayura, but Anubis interrupts and tells Ryo to let him handle it while Ryo leaves to rescue the Ronin Warriors. Dynasty soldiers attack Násti and Jun, but the Jewel of Life protects them and kills the soldiers. Knowing that the Jewel is a mystical artifact that poses a threat to the Dynasty and not wanting to risk Násti and Jun uncovering its powers, Badamon suggests they do something about it. However, Arago is not worried, believing that the Ronins and their allies have no way of using the three mystical artifacts that could spell doom for the Dynasty: the Inferno Armor, the Soul Swords of Fervor, and the Jewel. Anubis is able to hold his own against Lady Kayura with Kháos's staff protecting him; however, to his surprise, the staff does not strike her down. Rowen, revealed to have faked his death, ends up in a cavern where he finds the other Ronin Warriors, having turned to statues after being completely drained of power. Rowen uses the strength of his armor's power of Life to try to awaken the others before collapsing. Ryo arrives and is confronted by the Dark Warlords and defeated; however, Jun, Násti, and White Blaze arrive and, when Jun rushes forward to help, the Jewel protects Ryo and harms the Dark Warlords, driving them off. However, Lady Kayura arrives and, like the Staff of the Ancients, the Jewel has no effect on her. Rowen and the other Ronin Warriors appear to help Ryo fight the Dynasty.
36	"Cheap Tricks" / "Final Battle! Kayura vs. Kikōtei"; Transliteration: "Kessen! Kayura Tai Kikōtei" (Japanese: 決戦!カユラ対輝煌帝)	Toshifumi Kawase	Saburo Ebinuma	Asuka Keisaku	February 11, 1989	August 14, 1995
The reunited Ronin Warriors face down Lady Kayura in order to fight Arago. However, the Dark Warlords demand to fight them instead and drop Ryo, Cye, and Kento through trap doors to separate them, leaving Sage and Rowen to face Lady Kayura. Ryo, Sage, and Cye land in a pit is filled with water, but Cye manages to find an exit, dropping the three into a chasm. Sage and Rowen battle Lady Kayura, targeting her amulet while trying to protect Jun and Násti from Dynasty soldiers when the Jewel of Life seems to be ineffective. Cale confronts Cye in the chasm, using the darkness to his advantage as Cye cannot see where he is. At the same time, Kento faces Dais, who grows to a giant size to fight him, while Ryo faces Sekhmet and is trapped in a sea of acidic venom which will slowly erode at his armor and then his body. Anubis is confused when Kháos's staff glows and remembers how it would not let him harm Lady Kayura and how she disappeared after it did not. He realizes that this might be a sign that Ryo is in trouble and heads off to help him, saving him and driving Sekhmet away. As Kento is about to be killed by Dais, Anubis causes Dais to disappear using the staff and they leave as Ryo convinces Kento that Anubis is on their side. They reach Cye in time for Anubis to restore light to the area with the staff, which also drives off Cale. The group reunites and Ryo forms the Inferno, blocking Lady Kayura's Star Sword Scream and breaking her amulet with Rage of Inferno. Lady Kayura is left confused at where she is and when Ryo goes to finish her off, Anubis stops him, explaining that the staff would not let him harm her. The Jewel of Life also glows and Badamon and Arago grow worried as the Ronin Warriors now control the artifact, and the Warriors watch as Arago brings Lady Kayura back to him.
37	"Anubis' Armor Revived" / "The Red Lightning Flash Reborn"; Transliteration: "Fukkatsu no Kōraisen" (Japanese: 復活の紅雷閃)	Kunihisa Sugishima	Masanori Oka & Toshiko Nakaya	Kunihisa Sugishima	February 18, 1989	August 15, 1995
The Ronin Warriors practice for the upcoming fight with Arago while Anubis meditates. When they leave, Násti and Jun stay behind along with Anubis, who is unsure of what Kháos's will for him now is. The Warriors reluctantly accept this, but warn Anubis that they will not hold back on Lady Kayura if they encounter her, as she fights with Arago. Meanwhile, Lady Kayura remembers that she is the last remaining member of Kháos's people, which has granted her great supernatural powers. She takes her amulet off and resists the evil, worrying Badamon and Arago as, without Lady Kayura, he does not have the power of Kháos's clan on his side when the shrines he is building for the nine armors are complete. He says that his plan to unite the Dynasty and mortal world under his control is impossible without her help. Badamon proposes letting her regain her memories and then having him possess her mind and soul so she will be under their control. However, they must keep Anubis away for the plan to work, so Arago sends the Dark Warlords to deal with him. The Warriors battle an army of Dynasty soldiers, but are confused that no stronger enemies appear to fight. Badamon goes to Lady Kayura and possesses her; Anubis, sensing this and realizing that she is the last of Kháos's clan, becomes determined to save her like Kháos saved him. The Dark Warlords attack and Anubis is forced to fight them until he uses Kháos's staff to split the land and send them away. As the Warriors defeat the Dynasty soldiers, Lady Kayura arrives atop a Dynasty Dark Matrix, and they are knocked out as their attacks are ineffective. As Lady Kayura is about to capture them, Anubis arrives to save her from Badamon, but is confronted by the Dark Warlords. However, the Shakujo levitates and takes the form of his helmet from his old armor of Cruelty. Realizing that Kháos's will is that he fight in his armor again, he puts the helmet on and dons his old armor, launching Quake With Fear at Lady Kayura.
38	"Lady Evil Sees the Light" / "Kayura! A Sacred Awakening"; Transliteration: "Kayura! Sei naru Mezame" (Japanese: カユラ!聖なる目覚め)	Susumu Ishizaki	Yuki Oonishi	Asuka Keisaku	February 25, 1989	August 16, 1995
Anubis tries to reach the real Lady Kayura, but Badamon tells him that his hold on her is unbreakable. Meanwhile, Nether Spirits come from one of nine nearby towers and take one of the Ronin Warriors to one of the towers. The possessed Lady Kayura tries to convince Anubis to surrender while Anubis tries to convince the Dark Warlords that they are being used, which Lady Kayura proves by trapping them in spheres of energy. Badamon explains that the nine armors link the mortal realm and the Nether World, which has always been the Warlords' purpose. Násti confirms this, saying that there is an old legend that mentions nine keys, which she realizes means the nine armors, and warns that the world could be destroyed as a result. Lady Kayura defeats Anubis and captures him before going after Jun and the Jewel of Life. Násti realizes that the Jewel still has the power to defeat Arago, which is why she seeks it. Meanwhile, Anubis prays to Kháos for strength and manages to break Badamon's spell, freezing him and sending his armor from his body. This causes Kháos's staff to reappear and drive away the Nether Spirits holding him prisoner. Anubis sacrifices himself to save Násti and free Kayura from the influence of evil, as Badamon prepares to use the remaining armor to open a gateway to the mortal world. However, he warns that, if they miss the opportunity caused by the eclipse of the sun in the mortal world, not even the power of the armors will be enough to try again. Lady Kayura leads Násti, Jun and White Blaze to a barge that will lead them to safety and becomes determined to fight Arago as Anubis wanted her to, informing Jun that the Jewel of Life holds great power and the secret to defeating the Dynasty. Determined to save his friends, Jun has White Blaze carry him to Ryo and tries to use the Jewel to free him, but fails until Dynasty soldiers attack. As Lady Kayura, armed with Anubis' armor and Kháos's staff, faces off against Arago, the Jewel frees the Ronin Warriors and the Dark Warlords as Arago grows to a giant size to fight.
39	"Triumphant Warriors" / "Shine! Five Warriors"; Transliteration: "Kagayake! Gonin no Senshitachi" (Japanese: 輝け!五人の戦士達)	Osamu Sekita	Jinzo Toriumi & Satoshi Iwasaki	Mamoru Hamatsu	March 4, 1989	August 17, 1995
The Dark Warlords reject Arago and join the Warriors in fighting Arago, who warns them that, once the sun is completely dark, the mortal world will absorbed by the Nether Realm and he will be victorious. Lady Kayura warns Ryo to be careful, as the tower is filled with the essence of pain and is behind the Dynasty's evil power and could turn Ryo evil like she once was. Arago transports the tower and himself into the mortal world, where its influence brings out the worst in humanity and causes people to turn on each other. Continuing the fight in the mortal world, Ryo dons the Inferno Armor and unleashes a column of flame that destroys Badamon. However, Arago is able to turn Ryo's Rage of Inferno attack aside and incapacitate him, attempting to absorb Ryo. With encouragement from Anubis' spirit, Ryo projects his body and soul into Arago, creating an opening for the Warriors to finish him off. Jun calls out for Ryo to be saved and the Jewel of Life sends out a beam of energy that saves Ryo. With Arago's defeat, the tower and its influence and the Nether Realm disappear. Ryo thanks Jun for saving his life and everyone celebrates by throwing off their helmets, causing their armors to disappear. Lady Kayura congratulates the Warriors on defeating Arago and, as they are no longer needed, she and the former Dark Warlords return to the Nether Realm to rebuild. Everyone celebrates by playing a game of catch with a ball of energy created by the Jewel.

== OVAs ==
=== Ronin Warriors: Gaiden ===
No. overall	OVA no.	Title	Directed by	Storyboard by	Original release date	English air date
40	1	"Once Again! Samurai Troopers!"; Transliteration: "Gaisenshi, Futatabi" (Japanese: 鎧戦士、再び)	Kazuki Akane	Mamoru Hamatsu	April 30, 1989	April 2, 2003
In the streets of New York, Sage's Armor of Halo kills gang members attacking it and the bystanders, while the mysterious figure Shikaisen congratulates it. Meanwhile in Japan, Kento, having won $3 million in a lottery, throws a birthday party for Ryo. Ryo notices that Sage is missing from the party, and then a news broadcast of the killings caused by the Armor of Halo. The next day, Ryo decides to fly to New York and is joined by Cye and Kento, who were informed by Mia. Rowen, Mia, and Ully arrive in New York first; Rowen decides to find the photographer who took the picture of the Armor of Halo, while Mia and Ully decide to look at the university that contacted Sage to find his whereabouts. However, Shikaisen attacks the airplane, and they believe that they are being sent a message. Rowen finds that the photographer has been killed, and his sister Runa believes Rowen killed him. At Kento's uncle's restaurant, Rowen meets with Mia and Ully, who say that the university had no record of ever reaching out to Sage and deduce that Sage was lured away for a mysterious reason. As Ryo, Kento, and Cye arrive, Rowen is attacked by Runa to avenge her brother, but is saved by Ryo. Ryo then has a dream that Sage is being manipulated by Shikaisen, and upon awakening decides to follow the hunch. Rowen and Kento find the Armor of Halo acting on its own accord and attacking bystanders. Ryo and Cye arrive, but Shikaisen reveals himself, telling them that he has Sage and will soon acquire the other armors. The Ronin Warriors are attacked by the military and decide to split up. As Ryo and Rowen flee, they are met by Runa, who tells them they can tell her the story later and to follow her.
41	2	"Save Your Friend! Samurai Heart!"; Transliteration: "Tomo o Sukue, Samurai Hāto" (Japanese: 友を救え、サムライハート)	Kazuki Akane	Mamoru Hamatsu	June 1, 1989	April 2, 2003
Ryo and Rowen follow Runa as they flee the police. Rowen recognizes her as the girl who tried to kill him earlier, as she had once believed them to be murderers. Mia and Ully are attacked in Kento's uncle's restaurant and taken hostage. Runa leads Ryo and Rowen to safety underneath the water purification plant. As Runa mourns the death of her brother, they are joined by Kento and Cye. Meanwhile, Shikaisen meets with his henchmen in Los Angeles, where Mia and Ully are held. His scientist explains that they have been using a computer to use Sage's armor, while using a mind disruptor on Sage to get him to pilot the armor and unlock its full potential. They use the power to attack a parade of people in Little Tokyo. The remaining Ronin Warriors resolve to face Shikaisen and to never split up again; despite his misgivings, Ryo allows Runa to join them as they head through Los Angeles. They locate Shikaise's hideout and free Sage and the Armor of Halo before confronting Shikaisen, who has mastered the dark mystical arts of ancient kingdoms and captures them and the armors. Shikaisen attempts to attack Ully, but is thwarted by Runa, who is gravely injured as Mia frees the Ronin Warriors. Runa tells Ryo that she was glad she was able to meet someone as special as him before dying in his arms. The Ronin Warriors then call upon their armor and battle Shikaisen once again. As Ryo attacks Shikaisen, Shikaisen changes to his true form and the Ronin Warriors' attacks are dispelled by the information acquired by the computer. They instead draw upon the Inferno Armor, which the computer does not recognize, to defeat Shikaisen. As the Ronin Warriors meet in New York, they pay tribute to Runa by throwing a bouquet of flowers wrapped in her hair bow into the river.

=== Ronin Warriors: Legend of the Inferno Armor ===
No. overall	OVA no.	Title	Directed by	Written by	Storyboard by	Original release date	English air date
42	3	"Mukala of the Sun"; Transliteration: "Taiyō no Mukara" (Japanese: 太陽のムカラ)	Mamoru Hamatsu	Fuyunori Gobu	Kunihisa Sugishima	October 8, 1989	April 2, 2003
During summer vacation, Cye and Kento go surfing during the hottest day, and Cye wonders about the armor and if fighting and destruction will define their lives. A large gust of wind soon engulfs the city, causing heavy damage and endangering the citizens, and Ully and Rowen go to visit Mia, but follow after White Blaze when he runs to the city. Mia explains that Ryo left in a hurry without explanation, and sent White Blaze to find him. Ryo asks his armor why it brought him to the city, and soon notices a ring around the sun. The ring soon fills the city with wildlife and jungle vegetation, but Ryo notices that it is an illusion. He is soon attacked by Mukala, an African warrior who fights with speed, agility, and power beyond that of a normal person. White Blaze, Rowen, and Sage soon join Ryo, but even with their armor they are unable to defeat him. Mukala attacks Ryo, who notices that he attacks with the spirit of an animal. Cye and Kento arrive, but Mukala deflects and reverses several of their attacks before calling upon his own armor - a Black Inferno Armor that glows along with Ryo's armor. Ryo is abducted, and the others attempt to call upon their own Inferno Armor, but are unable to summon it due to Cye's hesitancy. Sage then attempts to retrieve Ryo, but is captured as well.
43	4	"Black Inferno"; Transliteration: "Kuroi Kikōtei" (Japanese: 黒い輝煌帝)	Mamoru Hamatsu	Fuyunori Gobu	Kazuki Akane	November 1, 1989	April 2, 2003
As Ryo and Sage awaken in a distant land, they decide to venture out at dawn while Rowen and Kento discuss the Black Inferno Armor and a plan to find it, as well as Ryo and Sage. Cye tells the others he believes that their attempts will be helpless as they were not strong enough to overcome him, angering Kento. Kento blames Cye's hesitancy for Ryo and Sage's disappearance, to which Cye responds that he is tired of fighting and no longer wants to live the life of a Ronin Warrior. Rowen tells Cye that this is their destiny, to which he attacks both Rowen and Kento. Rowen then throws his Armor of Torrent into the lake. Ryo and Sage deduce that they are in Africa, and soon encounter Mukala as well as an African maiden named Naria. Mukala overpowers Ryo and Sage, shattering their helmets and knocking them unconscious. Naria asks Mukala why he brought the Ronin Warriors to fight in a distant land and if that is what the Black Inferno Armor wants. Mia notices that there is no record of the Black Inferno Armor, but deduces that Mukala is located in Tanzania. Naria frees Ryo and Sage, revealing that she is engaged to Mukala and that he is following an ancient tradition. As the strongest warrior in the village, he is able to don the Black Inferno Armor, but the White Inferno Armor and Black Inferno Armor cannot meet and Naria begs them not to fight. Ryo tells Naria that he cannot summon his Inferno Armor without the others. Naria is surprised, as Mukala is able to summon the Black Inferno on his own, and that it may be testing Ryo and the White Inferno Armor. She also says the Black Inferno Armor is worshiped in their tribe, the Taulagi, as a god. Ryo is soon called to fight Mukala in a ritual, which Naria is vehemently against. She frees Ryo and Sage, but they are soon found by Mukala.
44	5	"Started Running Armor"; Transliteration: "Hashirihajimeta Yoroi" (Japanese: 走り始めた鎧)	Mamoru Hamatsu	Masashi Ikeda	Mamoru Hamatsu	December 1, 1989	April 2, 2003
Naria pleads with them to stop fighting, but Ryo and Sage deduce that it is their armors that want to fight rather than themselves. Sage saves Ryo, who refuses to fight, and resolves to keep fighting, but realizes that they have become pawns in a battle between the two Inferno Armors and also decides to stop fighting. Cye, separated from the group and questioning his will to fight, is found by White Blaze. Kento, Rowen, Mia, and Ully travel to Nairobi, Tanzania to find Ryo and Sage, as well as decipher the conflict between the two armors rather than leaving it as a contest of strength. As they attempt to locate the Taulagi village, they are attacked by the tribe. Kento and Ully are separated from Rowen and Mia, but follow Naria to Ryo and Sage's location. Rowen and Mia discover engravings in a cave which speaks of The Tree of Life, whose evil light will inspire the people and save them from all that threaten their lives. The Tree of Life forms the entrance to their valley, while all is underneath the Black Inferno Armor. Kento attempts to rescue Ryo and Sage, but is intercepted by Mukala. Kento's armor then flashes a darker color as he attempts to battle Mukala, which Ully notices as appearing more evil. Mia reads on the cave walls that if the Black and White Inferno Armors, which were both born in the valley, were to ever meet, that it would release an energy that would be too much for the universe to bear. Rowen's armor unlocks a power within the crystals around them, causing lightning to strike The Tree of Life. More dark crystals arise, which Mukala uses to don the Black Inferno Armor. Rowen then arrives and tells Kento to stop fighting, telling them that another person's will is manipulating them into a dishonest fight. Naria tells Mukala that the armor has been influencing him negatively. Kento and Rowen attempt to attack Mukala, but both notice that it is their armor's will that is forcing them to fight rather than their own. Both then free themselves from their armor, to which Mia notices that there is a split between their armors and their own virtues that represent the forces of good. Back in Japan, Cye retrieves his Armor of Torrent, deciding to wear it again to save his friends and test whether his will is stronger than that of his armor.
45	6	"The More Than Sadness, Seek!"; Transliteration: "Kanashimi o Koeru Mono o Motomete!" (Japanese: 悲しみを超えるものを、求めて!)	Mamoru Hamatsu	Masashi Ikeda	Kunihisa Sugishima	January 11, 1990	April 2, 2003
Naria, Mia, and Ully attempt to find ingredients to make medicine for the ailing Ronin Warriors. Mia again reiterates her belief that it was their armors that forced them to fight, rather than the Ronin Warriors themselves. Cye soon finds the group and uses his virtue to restore Ryo, Sage, Rowen, and Kento to health. They notice the virtue has disappeared from his armor, noticing it must be removing themselves during this conflict. Naria explains the history of the armor and their tribe: the Black Inferno Armor appeared in the Valley of the Black Crystal, and that the Talaugi were worshiped because of this. The Black Inferno Armor was worn by their tribe and protected them from outside influence, but one day showed that it could move on its own power and revealed a darker side. When Mukala discovered that there was another Inferno Armor, the Black Inferno Armor ordered that it find and fight it, to which Mukala obeyed. Naria is dismayed that Mukala has become overpowered by the Black Inferno Armor. Black Blaze soon separates himself from White Blaze, which then separates Cye from the Armor of Torrent, which moves on its own accord. The Ronin Warriors decide to destroy both Inferno Armors, as the armors without virtue become sinister forces. Naria pleads with Mukala to end the conflict, but to no avail. White Blaze is soon attacked by the tribe, which then capture Mia, Ully, and Naria. Black Blaze gives the Armor of Torrent to Mukala, who summons the other armors to create the Inferno Armor. The Ronin Warriors soon find Mukala, but want to confront the Inferno Armor rather than him. The two Inferno Armors manipulate the sun and moon, creating a lunar eclipse that darkens the land. The Ronin Warriors see visions of the end of the world that would result from the armors' lust for battle. They resolve to let their virtues win and summon their own armor to battle the Inferno Armor, which is now acting on its own will. Despite being initially unable to cause any damage, they decide to fight with their spirits as one, attacking the Inferno Armor with the power of their virtues. This defeats the evil spirit residing within, and Ryo is able to don the Inferno Armor once again. Ryo then commences battle with Mukala, who has donned the Black Inferno Armor. Ryo again pleads with Mukala to end the battle, saying that an armor that has abandoned its spirit can only bring death. As they fight, Naria and White Blaze are gravely injured; as Mukala sees the damage, the Ronin Warriors use the opportunity to attack him with their virtues and let him see the true nature of the human spirit. The eclipse soon clears, and the armors revive Naria and White Blaze before disappearing. Mukala then approaches Naria and calls her by her name, as the group watches.

=== Ronin Warriors: Message ===
No. overall	OVA no.	Title	Directed by	Written by	Storyboard by	Original release date	English air date
46	7	"The Fateful End"; Transliteration: "Wakatte Ita Ketsumatsu" (Japanese: 解かっていた結末)	Osamu Sekita	Masashi Ikeda	Masashi Ikeda	March 21, 1991	June 3, 2003
Rowen runs through the city, wondering if he is being called to fight again but unsure who is calling upon them, as he feels his days of fighting should be behind him. A mysterious being known as Suzunagi covers the city with light beams and attacks Rowen. Rowen is able to deflect her attacks, confirming Suzunagi's suspicions that, though they are no longer Ronin Warriors, they still have enhanced abilities. She tells Rowen that they will continue to be Ronin Warriors until they die, that she feels sorry for them, and that they should curse the Ancient One for giving them their armors. A flashback shows the origins of the Armor of Strata: The Ancient One uncovers a box containing it, relieved that it has not found its true master. However, it is time for it to be called upon again due to the impending evil. As he unlocks the Armor of Strata, he is met by a young Suzunagi, imploring him not to release the armor as it would ignite the fires of war. The Ancient One notices that the girl is filled with bitterness of the past and commands the Armor of Strata to release her from her anger, but she evades the attack. In the present day, Rowen tells Suzunagi to relieve her hatred against the armors, and resolves to find the source behind her anger in order to put her at peace. Rowen uncovers Suzunagi's drawings of the armors, but notices that they are of different designs. He then sees a vision of Suzunagi proclaiming her hatred of the armors and attempting to destroy them. Suzunagi tells Rowen that the sadness she felt as a child has evolved into hatred, and orders Rowen to kill her. Rowen refuses to harm her until he discovers why she hates the armors. Suzunagi then states that Rowen will be judged, and summons the Armor of Strata on Rowen's behalf. Rowen sits in a new Armor of Strata, but he is immobile.
47	8	"Predestined Future"; Transliteration: "Shirasareta Mirai" (Japanese: 知らされた未来)	Osamu Sekita	Masashi Ikeda	Masashi Ikeda	May 22, 1991	June 3, 2003
As Suzunagi looks upon the immobile Rowen, she mentions that he is the "first." Cye has a dream of the armors and a distressed Rowen, who calls for help. Ryo, Sage, Cye, and Kento reunite, having experienced the same dream. Ryo opens a package from Rowen, consisting of a book from the Edo period called "The Legend of the Five Warriors." It is a stage play about the Ronin Warriors and their battle against Talpa, written in the 19th century before those events took place. Rowen's package contains a letter stating that, though the five have not seen each other as often since the armors disappeared, he believes they are being called again and will investigate. Ryo expresses disbelief that the play contains all of their battles, feeling as though they are puppets on a cardboard stage. Cye laments the idea that they are being drawn into battle again, wondering if this will define his life. He soon receives visions of dynasty soldiers attacking the city, but also of himself, wearing the Armor of Torrent and being embraced and protected by Suzunagi. However, when she questions Suzunagi, she tells him to stay away and that it is her destiny to protect his future. A vision appears of Cye and his armor being auctioned, with the auctioneer stating that though Cye has lost his will to fight, he has still chosen the battlefield. Cye wonders why he made this decision, but Suzunagi tells him that it is due to his nature as a warrior. Suzunagi tells Cye that she can see all, and that she knows his future, feeling the need to protect him due to his virtue of kindness and his decision to choose the armor. Cye says the armor will be a part of him forever, as well as fighting and violence. He asks Suzunagi why he needs to be protected, and she tells him that she must give up her life to protect his spirit and to remain true to himself. Cye then receives a vision of Suzunagi being bound and captured, and attempts to rescue her. He asks Suzunagi if this is the future she foresaw, and refuses to let it happen by summoning his armor. A new Armor of Torrent appears, and a tear forms in its eye. Suzunagi then mentions that this is now "two."
48	9	"The Broken Confidence"; Transliteration: "Kudakareta Jishin" (Japanese: 砕かれた自信)	Osamu Sekita	Masashi Ikeda	Masashi Ikeda	June 21, 1991	June 3, 2003
Sage informs Kento that Rowen and Cye are missing, and that he could be next. Sage reads "The Legend of the Five Warriors" and wonders how the superstitions of a previous century could have such a large impact on their lives. He mentions that, though becoming Ronin Warriors fulfilled their dreams, he was more than prepared to put down the sword for the rest of his life. He reflects that, though the armors helped rescue the world from evil, he still feels guilt from the anguish that they indirectly caused. Sage speculates that the play was likely written to warn future generations of their armors' evil nature and notices that it foretells of a child who will be sent forward from the past to show how them how to live as individuals. He believes that she was likely sent to fulfill their innermost wishes, and that a grudge may exist between the armors. Discovering a passage of the Inferno Armor destroying the others, Sage notices that this has not yet happened and wonders if it is their destiny. Realizing that something must have happened in the past, Sage concludes that their duty as Ronin Warriors is not over and that another battle may be coming. The Armor of Halo manifests in front of him and attempts to attack, but Sage does not defend himself. The armor stops its attack, to which Sage says the time of fighting force with force is finished, causing the armor to disappear. Sage mentions that he can see the path, to which Suzunagi looks on in surprise. Looking at the book once again, Sage notices a drawing of the building where Rowen had previously went to before he disappeared and rushes towards it. Kento attempts to jump off a skyscraper but is stopped before he lands, and he concludes that someone must be keeping them alive to summon the Inferno Armor. Suzunagi then attacks Kento with the Armor of Hardrock, confirming that she wants to summon the Inferno Armor to guide it to its proper path, and for this reason she created new sets of armor. Kento tells Suzunagi that the Inferno Armor causes nothing but destruction, but Suzunagi already knows this, saying that darkness shrouds the Inferno Armor and the light is needed to free the world. The new Armor of Hardrock approaches Kento, and though he attempts to fight it, he causes no damage. A light then engulfs the area, showing a flashback of a young Suzunagi and her mother. Sage soon arrives and notices the new Armor of Hardrock, but upon seeing him, Suzunagi retreats. The Armor of Hardrock attempts to follow her, but Kento jumps upon it, causing himself and the armor to disappear as Sage questions if this is the beginning or the end.
49	10	"The Wandering Soul"; Transliteration: "Samayoeru Kokoro" (Japanese: さまよえる心)	Osamu Sekita	Masashi Ikeda	Masashi Ikeda	July 25, 1991	June 3, 2003
Sage enters the building where Suzunagi is residing. Suzunagi reflects on changing of the seasons, how they are self-contained from her guilt, and whether she belongs in the current world. She commends on how the beauty in nature transcends everything in the heart, providing a sense of comfort and balance that can put the soul at ease. As Suzunagi pulls the new Armor of the Halo out of a chest, Sage approaches her. Suzunagi asks Sage what he is looking for, but Sage mentions that she summoned him. She tells him that she has no idea what her motivations are, but Sage deduces that it likely has something to do with the Inferno Armor and its nature of destruction. He tells Suzunagi that the Ronin Warriors no longer want anything to with that life. Suzunagi responds that she wants to remove all sorrow from the world, but Sage tells her that doing so will remove all good things from the world as well. Sage is then transported to town in an Edo-era town center, where a young Suzunagi and her mother live and where a performance of "The Legend of the Five Warriors" is playing. The area is soon attacked by battleships, and the play's author, Suzunagi's father, is punished by death for insisting its contents are real and causing panic on the way of life amongst the people. Sage, clad in his old armor, attempts to destroy the battleships but inadvertently destroys the town center. Suzunagi tells Sage that, in this world, he is the spirit and that, since he tried to fix the area's situation, he should not blame her for doing the same and that this is why they need the Inferno Armor. She tearfully pleads with Sage to put on his new Armor of Halo. Sage complies, but, before he can call upon the armor, he disappears, leaving Suzunagi in tears.
50	11	"The Truth Arrives"; Transliteration: "Otozureta Shinjitsu" (Japanese: 訪れた真実)	Osamu Sekita	Masashi Ikeda	Masashi Ikeda	August 23, 1991	June 3, 2003
Suzunagi laments that she has lost her spirit, no longer finding joy in the world. Ryo asks Mia why she is trying to prevent him from confronting Suzunagi, noting that the other Ronin Warriors have disappeared. Mia suggests that he may not need to fight and suggests a different approach. Ryo listens to voicemails from the other four members. Rowen's talks about "The Legend of the Five Warriors" and its ending, claiming that it ends in a bottomless pit of darkness with the armors destroyed, and predicts that a final battle is coming, urging them to end the cycle of violence. Cye's reflects on their previous battles, but he is now more worried about his immediate surroundings and himself. He feels the armors have deep problems within themselves that are beyond his control, but he now wants to focus on what he can control - his own life. Kento's inquires on the occurrences of the last few days, and how he wishes they can overcome their tormentor with the Inferno Armor. He tells them that he is afraid, but he is afraid because he is unsure of who they are fighting - whether it is a new villain, or themselves. Sage's urges Ryo to have faith in their emotions, telling them it is important to cause empathy for others. He feels that the armors had an influence on them for several generations, and that though the armors entwined themselves in dark moments in human history, it is ultimately the human spirit that is in control of them. It is through this mix that has caused strong compassion within the Ronin Warriors as well as humanity. Mia attends a meeting of a foreign government to discuss the appearances of dynasty soldiers fighting and causing damage in the city, as similar occurrences happened in Japan, and she claims she has the answers they seek. Ryo confronts Suzunagi, claiming that he can feel the others and causing the new Armors of Strata, Torrent, Halo, and Hardrock to appear. Ryo tells Suzunagi that he will comply with her plan since he has confidence in his friends. Suzunagi tells Ryo the unique toll the armors have taken on each of its members: Rowen understands the mistakes of the past, Cye is searching for peace of mind, Kento wonders if the fighting will ever end, while Sage has denied himself all battles. She asks Ryo what he thinks will be the end result of following their armors and tells him to summon the Inferno Armor to end her anguish. Ryo tells her that he is taking the armor in order to find the answers to their questions and relieve her of her curse, as the darkness and suffering they encountered had left their hearts weary and scarred. Ryo reunites with the warriors and they and Suzunagi are transported to a graveyard which she claims is filled with warriors who rejected the power of the armors. Suzunagi tells the warriors she will kill them there, but White Blaze emerges, placing a flower on Suzunagi's mother's grave. Her mother's spirit appears, telling her that her sadness and suffering caused a great darkness to grow within her. However, the graveyard contains warriors who not only rejected the spirit of the armors, but embraced the power of love, allowing them to relieve their grudge against humanity and rest in peace. Suzunagi's flashback of the battleship attack continues, where she witnesses her mother being killed in a fire, leaving her alone and without someone to love. Her mother tells her that she placed her love in a small corner of the armors, trusting that the five spirits would arrive in a later era and help ease Suzunagi's suffering. Suzunagi's mother tells her that she will always love her, and thanks the Ronin Warriors for guiding Suzunagi back to the light. With Suzunagi able to love again, she has finally found the peace she had been waiting for. The Ronin Warriors gather for the final time and overlook the city in their new armors. They accept that they are beginning a new chapter as Warriors, but it will be themselves rather than their armors that will make an impact throughout history. As long as their hearts are filled with love, they know their spirits will dispel the negative influences and guide them towards the path of righteousness. A post-credit scene shows Ully, now in junior high, winning a kendo tournament.
