= East Hill =

East Hill may refer to:

- East Hill, Kent, England
- East Hill, a village amalgamated into Brome Lake, Quebec, Canada
- East Hill (Schoharie County, New York), an elevation
- East Hill, a mountain in Granite County, Montana

== See also ==
- East Hills (disambiguation)
