= Uchū Majin Daikengo =

Japanese mecha anime series

- 宇宙魔神ダイケンゴー
- Genre: Mecha
- Directed by: Masami Anno
- Music by: Hiroshi Tsutsui
- Country of origin: Japan
- Original language: Japanese
- No. of episodes: 26

Production
- Producers: Yoshiaki Koizumi (TV Asahi); Satoshi Yuyama (Tori Pro); Mitsuo Satō (Green Box)
- Production companies: TV Asahi; Tori Pro; Toei Animation

Original release
- Network: ANN (TV Asahi)
- Release: July 27, 1978 – February 15, 1979

Daikengo (Japanese: 宇宙魔神ダイケンゴー, Hepburn: Uchū Majin Daikengō; Space Demon-God Daikengō) is a Japanese mecha anime television series produced by Tori Pro. It consisted of 26 episodes from July 27, 1978, to February 15, 1979, and broadcast from TV Asahi.

== Plot summary ==
Space Guardian Daikengo flies through space to re-establish galactic peace. On-board is prince Ryger, who ran away from his planet Emperius to defeat the menace out of his reign borders, in order to save his people. Cleo, the corrupted prime minister's daughter, helps him along with two nice little robots, Anike and Otoke. They fight evil Lady Baracross, leading invasion forces, with her assistant Roboleon, wearing a Napoleon-style hat. Daikengo is the first robot with scuttles on his mouth. When he opens them, his vampire-style teeth are shown and he can spit fire.

== Overview ==
The show was the first and last work produced by Tori Pro which was launched by Jinzo Toriumi, who left Tatsunoko Productions. It was planned and produced by Satoshi Suyama and Akiyoshi Sakai who left the company at the same time. It is a robot anime that depicts the story of the main characters who are active in the universe. Mitsuko Horie, a singer who has sung many anime songs, made her voice acting debut here, and Bin Shimada would also debut here.

Sometimes it is said that "the stage is set on a star other than Earth" (although there are multiple episodes set on Earth), and the fashion of the characters is based on the Western European style of the Middle Ages, but mixed gender design (Prince Liger's costume has a hem that extends app the way down like a woman's skirt), and it has a different ethnic feel from Earth. There are also settings that have not been seen in robot animation so far, such as the "belt sword" taken out from the buckle of the belt and the original stone statue of Daikengo itself.

The show was broadcast at Asahi Broadcasting Corporation between July 27, 1978, and February 15, 1979.

Toei Channel re-broadcast the show between September 22 and December 15, 2008.

== Characters ==
- Liger (17 years old): Hiroya Ishimaru (also serves as the next notice narration)

The second prince of Emperius, Liger is a master of swords and a hot-blooded man. He is a pilot of combat ship. At first, he was literally a "rogue", but he grew up personally throughout his journey.

- Cleo (16 years old): Mitsuko Horie

Dulles' daughter, she is a beautiful woman who excels in martial arts, has a strong spirit. Cleo is a Daiken buggy pilot.

- Anike: Toku Nishio

The older brother of a support robot who serves Liger and is Daiken Caterpillar pilot.

- Otoke: You Inoue

The younger brother of a support robot who serves Liger. He is taller than his brother. Like his brother, he is a Daiken Caterpillar pilot.

- King Empel (50 years old): Yuzuru Fujimoto

Father of Liger, Empel is a king of Emperius, the main star of the Galactic Federation. He is always calm and deposited.

- Queen Eliza (42 years old): Kyoko Tarui

Liger's mother, Eliza is a gentle and peace-loving woman.

- Zamson (20 years old): Keaton Yamada (credited under his real name "Shunji Yamada")

Liger and Euger's older brother. It was thought that he was killed in action, but he revived as a cyborg.

- Bryman: Goro Naya (also serves as narration)

A mysterious cyborg warrior who drives a horse-shaped mecha sala bradder and helps Liger.

- Yuger (15 years old): Bin Shimada

Liger's younger brother, Yuger is a gentle and honest boy who is the exact opposite of his brother, but the sense of justice is comparable to his brother. Initially, he was supposed to become a Daikengo pilot at the behest of his father. In the final episode, he commanded the Galactic Federation Army and made a breakthrough to Magellan, which was protected by a space storm.

- Dulles (45 years old): Jun Hazumi

Cleo's father, Dulles is Emperius's military minister, but he is a member of the Magellan army. In episode 12, Yuger sees him communicating with Roboleon, which causes a coup d'état and makes Daikengo a souvenir, but Roboleon is about to purge him as a souvenir. However, he was saved by Liger who were secretly riding Daikengo, and even though he was forgiven, he rescued Liger from the sudden hit by Roboleon who withdrew, and ended up as a warrior.

- Emperor Magellan: Banjo Ginga (credited under his real name "Takashi Tanaka")

Ruler of Magellan, he is known for his great power.

- Baracross: Keiko Tomochika

General Commander of the Star Magellan, he is also a user of space ninjutsu.

Roboleon: Takeshi Aono A robot general made in rose cloth, Roboleon is a ruthless but comical side that mercilessly purges those who have surrendered.

- Goricki: Shigezō Sasaoka

A big man who is a servant of Dulles and has a strong strength. He followed him during the coup, but in the end he fought against Roboleon to protect Dulles, who was betrayed by Roboleon, but he was defeated.

- Dr. Gooder: Banjo Ginga (credited under his real name "Takashi Tanaka")

Magellan army scientist, he is remodels the dying Prince Zamson into a Bryman and secretly continues to support him.

== Mecha ==
=== Daikengo ===
The legendary guardian deity that has been passed down to the Emperius star for generations. He is resurrected by receiving the energy of the genie star.

The giant fighter Combat Ship (one crew member), the buggy-type giant machine Daiken Buggy (one crew member), and the giant tank Daiken Caterpillar (two crew members) combine to form the giant robot Daiken Go. Normally, it transforms into a mobile base / Daiken base and runs around the universe. When using the mechanism "Kengo Separator" they separate into each machine, "Daiken Base Arranger" to combine into the base form, and "Space Genie Daikengo" to combine into the Genie form.

The total length is 120.0m and the weight is 800t. The power source is photon energy. A single warp is also possible.

When the armor of the face splits in two, it has a mouth with fangs like Hannya, and it spits fire from there (Daiken Fire).

==== Weapons ====
• Daiken Fire Flamethrower emitted from the mouth. From there, it takes a pattern that leads to a special move. Similar flame radiation is possible from the upper part of the booster on the back.

• xDAIKEN Space Torpedo A shark- shaped torpedo fired from a triangular launch port that appears with both belly bellies stored. After the second episode, it becomes an ordinary missile and is sometimes called a Daiken missile.

• Daiken Chak Wing end tubular part the left and right pair are electromagnetically coupled to form a nunchaku- shaped weapon.

• Daiken Cutter It pops out from the tip of the toe and cuts through the enemy's beast bone mecha.

• Arrow Fencer A slender sword that is stored in the legs and taken out from the kneecap. Equipped with two, it basically fights with two swords. His special moves are the "Rotating Large Sword" that connects at the rear end of the handle and rotates it to chop it, and the "Special Cross Sword" that cuts the opponent into crosses using the dual wield style. The cross sword is used overwhelmingly more frequently. When taking it out, it takes a unique stance of crossing the two on the head.

• Daiken Shield Defensive armament, it removes the pentagonal shoulder shield and connects it at the rear end to use it as a handheld hexagonal shield. It may be thrown and attacked like Frisbee (Daiken Guard Run).

• Daiken Punch A so-called "rocket punch" that shoots from the elbow.

==== Beast Bone mecha ====
The main weapon of the Magellan Empire. As the name implies, it is a robot that imitates the bones of a beast. Prior to the advent of Daikengo, beast bone mecha was a threat to the Galactic Federation.

The animal bone mecha basically uses vertebrates such as dinosaurs as motifs, but there are also those with arthropods such as Kotsupider and Ganilla as motifs. In addition, there are mass-produced aircraft, and many fighters in the shape of fish bones have appeared.

==== Others ====
Sarah Blader A horse-shaped machine on which Bryman is boarding. It is mainly armed with two laser cannons on the forefoot.

Empel command A large battle mother ship owned by Emperius. There are countless fighters on board. With the exception of Daikengo, it can be said that it is the largest force currently owned by the Galactic Federation.

== Staff ==
- Planning: Jinzo Toriumi
- Original: Akiyoshi Sakai (serialized magazines "TV Land" and "Televi-kun")
- Art director: Mitsuki Nakamura
- Sound director: Yasunori Honda
- Music: Hiroshi Tsutsui
- Sound effects: Ishida Sound Pro
- Mechanic aettings: Kunio Okawara
- Character settings: Motosuke Takahashi, Chuichi Iguchi, Shuaki Takemoto
- General director: Akira Yahiro
- Producers: Yoshiaki Koizumi (TV Asahi), Satoshi Suyama (Tori Pro), Mitsuo Sato (Green Box)
- Animation director: Yoshinori Tanabe
- Background: Kazuo Okada
- Color design: Kunitoshi Okajima
- Special effects: Masanori Yamazaki
- Photography: Hideo Okazaki and others
- Edited by: Eiko Nishide
- Recording: Atsushi Harada
- Developing: Toei Chemical Industry
- Producers: Masatoshi Yui, Takashi Arai
- Production progress: Hiroshi Takahashi, Koji Yasuda, Sachiko Watanabe, etc.
- Production cooperation: Green Box
- Produced by: TV Asahi, Tori Pro, Toei Agency

== Episodes ==
In all times, the letter "star" is used in the subtitle.

Number of episodes	Broadcast date	Titles	Screenplay by	Directed by	Beast Bone mecha appearance
1	July 27 1978	Arakure Seiunji	Jinzo Toriumi	Asahi Yahiro	Chirano Sauler
2	August 3	Lonely Star Warrior	Satoshi Suyama; Ichiro Yamamura	Yoriyasu Kogawa	Stego Sauler
3	August 24	Wandering Star Bryman	Akiyoshi Sakai; Michio Fukushima	Shigeyasu Yamauchi	
4	August 31	Two Stray Stars	Jinzo Toriumi; Gen Mouri	Yoriyasu Kogawa	Bonebird
5	September 7	Friendship Asteroid (Asteroid)	Satoshi Suyama; Ichiro Yamamura	Yoriyasu Kogawa	
6	September 14	Farewell Guerrilla Stars	Akiyoshi Sakai; Michio Fukushima	Asahi Yahiro	Mount
7	September 21	No Abnormality on the Third Planet	Jinzo Toriumi; Gen Mouri	Shigeyasu Yamauchi	
8	September 28	Betrayal Star of Love	Akiyoshi Sakai; Michio Fukushima	Asahi Yahiro	
9	October 5	Oath of Two Binary Stars	Jinzo Toriumi; Gen Mouri	Yoriyasu Kogawa	
10	October 12	Don't Cry Mother Koiboshi	Akiyoshi Sakai; Michio Fukushima	Shigeyasu Yamauchi	Feniborn
11	October 19	Hell Nebula Showdown	Jinzo Toriumi; Gen Mouri	Asahi Yahiro	Natkats
12	October 26	The King Star Calling the Storm	Akiyoshi Sakai; Michio Fukushima	Yoriyasu Kogawa	Rigoder
13	November 2	The Secret of the Bry Star	Akiyoshi Sakai; Michio Fukushima	Yoriyasu Kogawa	Ganilla
14	November 9	Blueprints for Moving Stars	Masashi Ebinuma; Akiyoshi Sakai	Asahi Yahiro	Robadan
15	November 16	Devil Monster Star	Akiyoshi Sakai; Michio Fukushima	Shigeyasu Yamauchi	
16	November 23	Star Migratory Birds	Akiyoshi Sakai; Michio Fukushima	Yoriyasu Kogawa	
17	November 30	Friendship of the Third Planet	Jinzo Toriumi; Gen Mouri	Asahi Yahiro	
18	December 7	Mysterious Yurei Star	Akiyoshi Sakai; Michio Fukushima	Yoriyasu Kogawa	
19	December 14	Galactic Stray Stars	Jinzo Toriumi; Gen Mouri	Yoriyasu Kogawa	Leviathan
20	December 21	Mother Star Crisis	Michio Fukushima	Asahi Yahiro	Scorpion; Chirano Sauler; Stego Sauler; Rigoder
21	January 4 1979	The Cross of the Stars	Michio Fukushima	Yoriyasu Kogawa	Batbone
22	January 11	Dangerous! Third Planet	Michio Fukushima	Asahi Yahiro	
23	January 18	Conspiracy of the Magellan Nebula	Akiyoshi Sakai; Michio Fukushima	Asahi Yahiro	The Maze
24	February 1	The Challenge of the Star Demon King	Michio Fukushima	Yoriyasu Kogawa	
25	February 8	Nebula Lighthouse X-01	Michio Fukushima	Yoriyasu Kogawa	
26	February 15	Fight! Three Swordsmen of the King Star	Satoshi Suyama	Asahi Yahiro	Won Tiger

== Product development ==
Z Build Plan Daikengo, which is a set of combat ship, Daiken buggy, and Daiken caterpillar, is sold separately from Takatoku in the Z alloy series. In addition, "Daikengo Combat Action" that can be transformed into a Daiken base and a standard alloy of Daikengo and Sarabredder have been released.

At the time of broadcasting, Takatoku's Z Build Plan Daikengo advertisement published in the Asahi Shimbun was a catch phrase of Amazing Build Plan, and while the three machines before transformation can be played alone, Daiken can be connected vertically. It appeals to Go that it can be combined with the Daiken base by connecting it horizontally.
