= The Adventures of Hutch the Honeybee (1989 TV series) =

- 昆虫物語 みなしごハッチ
- Genre: Adventure
- Created by: Tatsuo Yoshida
- Based on: The Adventures of Hutch the Honeybee
- Written by: Jinzō Toriumi
- Directed by: Iku Suzuki
- Music by: Kōji Makaino
- Opening theme: "Minashigo Hatchi" by Hitomi Ishikawa
- Ending theme: "Yume no temae de" by Hitomi Ishikawa
- Country of origin: Japan
- Original language: Japanese
- No. of episodes: 55

Production
- Executive producer: Ippei Kuri
- Producers: Minoru Ohno; Tōru Horikoshi; Tsuneo Tamura
- Production companies: Tatsunoko Production; Yomiko Advertising

Original release
- Network: NTV
- Release: July 21, 1989 – August 31, 1990

The Adventures of Hutch the Honeybee (昆虫物語 みなしごハッチ, Konchū Monogatari: Minashigo Hatchi; lit. A Bug's Tale: Hutch the Orphan) is an anime television series produced by Yomiko Advertising and Tatsunoko Production that serves as a remake of the studio's 1970 television series of the same name. The series originally aired on NTV from July 21, 1989, to August 31, 1990.

The show follows the original series' main storyline, and tells the adventure of a young bee who searches for his missing queen bee mother. Like the 1970 show, this remake is notable for its sad and cruel scripts, often featuring the deaths of the protagonist's friends.

== Cast ==
- Hitomi Ishikawa as Hutch
- Atsuko Mine as Honey
- Masako Nozawa as Kumagoro
- Michiko Nomura as Aya
- Rei Sakuma as Roza
- Ryūji Saikachi as Old Man Osamushi
- Toshiko Maeda as Narrator
- Yoshiko Sakakibara as Mam

== Episodes ==
No.	Title	Original release date
1	"maboroshi no mama" (まぼろしのママ)	July 21, 1989
2	"mama wa doko ni" (ママはどこに)	July 28, 1989
3	"mushi no undōkai" (ムシのうんどう会)	August 11, 1989
4	"mama to yobasete" (ママと呼ばせて)	August 18, 1989
5	"damedame mushi no uta" (ダメダメ虫のうた)	August 25, 1989
6	"minami ni mama ga iru" (南にママがいる)	September 1, 1989
7	"baibai yowamushi-kun" (バイバイよわむし君)	September 8, 1989
8	"kiageha no shōjo" (キアゲハの少女)	September 15, 1989
9	"tomodachi ni narō" (ともだちになろう)	September 22, 1989
10	"nonki na kumabachi" (のんきなクマバチ)	September 29, 1989
11	"kagayake hotaru" (かがやけホタル)	October 6, 1989
12	"shiroari no yūki" (シロアリのゆうき)	October 13, 1989
13	"5 hiki no samurai mushi" (5匹のサムライ虫)	October 20, 1989
14	"madarachō no tabi" (マダラチョウの旅)	October 27, 1989
15	"osoroshii mizu'umi" (おそろしい湖)	November 3, 1989
16	"tentōmushi no hoshi" (テントウムシの星)	November 10, 1989
17	"subarashii takaramono" (すばらしい宝物)	November 17, 1989
18	"mama wa sugu soba ni" (ママはすぐそばに)	November 24, 1989
19	"mushi no konsato" (ムシのコンサート)	December 1, 1989
20	"ojiisan no himitsu" (おじいさんの秘密)	December 15, 1989
21	"kyōryū no oashisu" (恐竜のオアシス)	December 22, 1989
22	"yukiyama wo koete" (雪山をこえて)	December 29, 1989
23	"hani to no saikai" (ハニーとの再会)	January 12, 1990
24	"umi no mukō he" (海の向こうへ)	January 19, 1990
25	"mama wa hi no shima ni" (ママは火の島に)	January 26, 1990
26	"yume no temae de" (夢の手前で)	February 9, 1990
27	"mama no nukumori" (ママのぬくもり)	February 16, 1990
28	"kerao no hashi" (ケラオの橋)	February 23, 1990
29	"kogane no hikkoshi" (コガネのひっこし)	March 2, 1990
30	"kita ni kaeru" (北に帰る)	March 9, 1990
31	"hacchi to san dorobō" (ハッチと三泥棒)	March 16, 1990
32	"katatsumuri tonda" (カタツムリ飛んだ)	March 21, 1990
33	"nagasareta hacchi" (流されたハッチ)	March 30, 1990
34	"minami no obake mushi" (南のおばけムシ)	April 6, 1990
35	"saigo no uso" (さいごのウソ)	April 13, 1990
36	"ojiisan no tōdai" (おじいさんの灯台)	April 20, 1990
37	"yakusō wo motomete" (薬草をもとめて)	April 27, 1990
38	"hacchi to samurai" (ハッチとサムライ)	May 4, 1990
39	"nise mono suzumebachi" (ニセ者スズメバチ)	May 11, 1990
40	"wagamama mimi" (わがままミミー)	May 18, 1990
41	"majo no iru mori" (魔女のいる森)	May 25, 1990
42	"mura no abarenbō" (村のあばれんぼう)	June 1, 1990
43	"kagerō no hanazono" (カゲロウの花園)	June 8, 1990
44	"hontō no chikaramochi" (ほんとうの力持ち)	June 15, 1990
45	"hacchi to tonbo fūfu" (ハッチとトンボ夫婦)	June 22, 1990
46	"komori wa taihen" (子もりはたいへん)	June 29, 1990
47	"yume no izumi wo sagase" (夢の泉をさがせ)	July 6, 1990
48	"papamushi makeruna" (パパムシまけるな)	July 13, 1990
49	"mushi no hana matsuri" (ムシの花まつり)	July 20, 1990
50	"ma no yama no yūjō" (魔の山の友情)	July 27, 1990
51	"chiisana sensei" (ちいさな先生)	August 3, 1990
52	"oyako mushi no yūki" (おや子ムシの勇気)	August 10, 1990
53	"hachi no shōjo kenshi" (ハチの少女剣士)	August 17, 1990
54	"yume wo shinjite" (夢を信じて)	August 24, 1990
55	"saishūkai mama ni dakarete" (最終回 ママに抱かれて)	August 31, 1990

== Foreign versions ==
In France, whereas the original series had been broadcast under the title Le Petit Prince Orphelin (the Little Orphan Prince), this remake was broadcast on France 3 under the titles of Hacou l'abeille (Hacou the bee), or simply Hacou with only 26 of the 55 episodes being shown.

In Italy, the series was broadcast on Italia 1. Only 4 of the 55 episodes were aired

In the Middle East, the anime was dubbed in Jordan under the title of Arabic: Siwar Al-Asal (Arabic: سوار العسل). However, the Arabic dubbing was limited to dubbing the first 26 episodes of the series, and did not complete the rest.
