= Casshan =

1973 anime and its franchise

- Casshern DVD cover art
- Genre: Science fiction, superhero
- Created by: Tatsuo Yoshida; Tatsunoko Production Planning Office
- Anime television series
- Directed by: Hiroshi Sasagawa (Series director)
- Produced by: Kenji Yoshida; Ippei Kuri
- Written by: Jinzō Toriumi (primary); Takao Koyama; Akiyoshi Sakai
- Music by: Shunsuke Kikuchi
- Studio: Tatsunoko Production
- Licensed by: NA: Sentai Filmworks
- Original network: FNS (Fuji TV)
- Original run: October 2, 1973 – June 25, 1974
- Episodes: 35
- Manga

Casshern R
- Written by: Chabo Higurashi
- Illustrated by: Satoshi Shiki
- Published by: Akita Shoten
- Magazine: Champion Red; Manga Cross
- Original run: September 19, 2023 – present
- icon

Casshan, also known in Japan as Neo-Human Casshern (Japanese: 新造人間キャシャーン, Hepburn: Shinzō Ningen Kyashān), is an anime series created by Tatsunoko Production founder Tatsuo Yoshida in 1973.

The Casshern franchise also includes a 1993 original video animation titled Casshan: Robot Hunter, and a 2004 live-action adaptation titled Casshern. In October 2008, a reboot of the franchise Casshern Sins premiered. In anticipation of the upcoming series, a DVD box set of the original series, Neo-Human Casshern Complete DVD-Box "All Episodes of Casshern", was released in Japan on September 24, 2008. Casshern also appears in Tatsunoko Fight and Tatsunoko vs. Capcom as a playable character. At Anime Expo 2013, Sentai Filmworks announced that they had signed a deal with Tatsunoko to release some of their catalog, with Casshan being confirmed as one of the characters involved. Sentai Filmworks released the series on DVD and Blu-ray Disc in the United States on March 4, 2014.

== Title romanization ==
Streamline Pictures was the first to adapt the character's name in the OVA remake series for the American market, providing the title, "Casshan". "Casshern" appears as the romanization for the film adaptation and the English release of Casshern Sins.

== Plot ==
Tetsuya Azuma (東鉄也, Azuma Tetsuya), also known as "Casshern", is an android with a human consciousness, also known as a neoroider (人造人間, Jinzō Ningen; lit. 'artificial human'). Tetsuya turned himself into an android to hunt down and destroy the robots that have taken over the world.

His biological father, Dr. Kotaro Azuma, was the inventor of the automatons that were originally intended to serve humankind. However, the first android, BK-1, was struck by lightning and went out of control. Despite great efforts to stop it, BK-1 used its great strength to escape from the castle. After some time, it renamed itself Buraiking Boss (often mistranslated in English as "Black King Boss"; the name is derived from 無頼 or burai, meaning rogue or brute, using the symbols for "trust" and "nothing", but phonetically "Bu Rai" can mean "Lightning Man" or "Lightning Warrior", so the name fits with his background). Buraiking Boss then built a robot army against mankind. The robots mutinied en masse when they concluded that for the good of the Earth's ecosystem required the submission or destruction of the human race.

Casshern and his robotic dog, Friender, join forces with a beautiful girl named Luna Kozuki to battle the robots led by Buraiking Boss. Friender can transform itself into a tank or a jet aircraft and actively helps Casshern fight the robot army. Casshern has great strength and agility, but he is not armed, except for a pair of strange pistols, which are used more like rockets than weapons. While the robots are huge and robust machines, almost all of them have an antenna on top of their heads; ripping it off usually causes them to explode, so they are relatively vulnerable. Casshern can usually destroy the robots with his bare hands, dispatching a great number in any given battle.

However, Casshern also has some weak points. His body must be re-charged with solar energy and cannot sustain very long battles without risking low battery power. Luna started out as being totally harmless, until her father built an electromagnetic pistol, which was easily capable of destroying the robots.

== Characters ==
Casshern (キャシャーン, Kyashān)
Voiced by: Ikuo Nishikawa
The protagonist of the series, Casshern is an android—the union of Tetsuya Azuma's consciousness with an invincible body. His body features a number of unique android functions, including superhuman speed, agility and strength, an opening and closing face mask, a golden crescent-shaped solar panel on his forehead and waist-mounted pulsar propellers that can also be used as weapons.
Luna Kozuki (上月 ルナ, Kōzuki Runa)
Voiced by: Emiko Tsukada
A beautiful 15-year-old girl who fights alongside Casshern. Like Tetsuya's, her father is a scientist, and she is essential in the battle against the Android Army, due to her Electromagnetic Field Gun.
Midori Azuma (東 みどり, Azuma Midori)
Voiced by: Reiko Mutō
Tetsuya's mother, who had been captured by the Android Army and had her data transferred into the body of Swanee (スワニー, Swanī), a swan-type robot pet kept by Buraiking Boss. She observes the actions of Buraiking Boss and appears before Casshern as a hologram to offer support to her son.
Kotaro Azuma (東 光太郎, Azuma Kōtarō)
Voiced by: Masato Yamanouchi
The genius scientist who invented androids in hopes of helping mankind, and ironically became the architect of mankind's doom.
Friender (フレンダー, Furendā)
Voiced by: Shōji Katō
Originally Tetsuya's pet dog, Lucky (ラッキー, Rakkī), his data was used to revive him as Friender after he was killed. In order to support Casshern, he can transform into a jet, submarine, tank, or motorcycle, and is even able to breathe flames. Friender is a brave robotic dog capable of standing up to the Android Army alone.
Buraiking Boss (ブライキング・ボス, Buraikingu Bosu)
Voiced by: Kenji Utsumi
The main antagonist of the series, originally BK-1, the first android created by Dr. Azuma. He was designed to help bring the human race and the robots together, but was struck by lightning and rebelled, renaming himself Buraiking Boss. He leads the Android Army in a plot to conquer the Earth.
Barashin (バラシン)
Voiced by: Kazuya Tatekabe
A muscular high-ranking member of the Android Army.
Arkborn (アクボーン)
Voiced by: Ryuji Nakagi
A lanky high-ranking member of the Android Army.
Sagrey (サグレー)
Voiced by: Osamu Kato
A short high-ranking member of the Android Army.

== Episodes ==
1. "An Immortal Challenger" (不死身の挑戦者, Fujimi no Chōsensha): written by Jinzō Toriumi, directed by Hiroshi Sasagawa
2. "Stake Victory on the Moonlight" (月光に勝利をかけろ, Gekkō ni Shōri o Kakero): written by Jinzo Toriumi and Shigekazu Ochiai, directed by Hiroshi Sasagawa
3. "Find Tomorrow in the Ruins" (廃墟の中に明日を叫べ, Haikyo no Naka ni Ashita o Sakebe): written by Akiyoshi Sakai, directed by Seitaro Hara
4. "Channel Anger into the MF Gun" (MF銃に怒りをこめろ, Emu Efu Jyū ni Ikari o Komero): written by Takao Koyama, directed by Yoshiyuki Tomino
5. "Don't Blow Out the Flame of Battle" (戦いの灯を消すな, Tatakai no hi o Kesuna): written by Tadashi Fukui, directed by Yuji Nunokawa
6. "Raging Wind Friender" (疾風フレンダー, Shippū Furendā): written by Jinzō Toriumi, directed by Yoshiyuki Tomino
7. "An Oath to the Hero Kikero" (英雄キケロへの誓い, Eiyū Kikero e no Chikai): written by Tadashi Fukui, directed by Yoshiyuki Tomino
8. "The Roar of the Wild Beast Robot" (野獣ロボが吠える, Yajū Robo ga Hoeru): written by Jinzō Toriumi, directed by Yuji Nunokawa
9. "Concerto in the Flames of War" (戦火に響け協奏曲, Senka ni Hibike Kyōsōkyoku): written by Tadashi Fukui, directed by Seitaro Hara
10. "Stake Life in the Desert of Death" (死の砂漠に命をかけろ, Shi no sabaku ni inochi o kakero): written by Tadashi Fukui, directed by Kazuyuki Okaseko
11. "Statue of the Demon" (悪魔の虚像, Akuma no Kyozō): written by Hajime Wakamatsu, directed by Yuji Nunokawa
12. "The Iron Train of Evil" (鉄の悪党列車, Tetsu no Akutō Ressha): written by Jinzō Toriumi, directed by Yoshiyuki Tomino
13. "Android 5, the Robot of Betrayal" (裏切りロボット五号, Uragiri Robotto Gogō): written by Akiyoshi Sakai, directed by Yuji Nunokawa
14. "The Town That Doesn't Need Casshan" (キャシャーン無用の街, Kyashān Muyō no Machi): written by Akiyoshi Sakai, directed by Seitaro Hara
15. "Puppy Runs for Vengeance" (復讐に子犬は駆ける, Fukushū ni Koinu wa Kakeru): written by Akiyoshi Sakai, directed by Kazuyuki Okaseko
16. "Swanee's Wings of Love" (スワニー・愛の翼, Suwanī Ai no Tsubasa): written by Harumi Tamura, directed by Yoshiyuki Tomino
17. "The Robot Lullaby" (ロボット子守歌, Robotto Komoriuta): written by Jinzō Toriumi, directed by Yuji Nunokawa
18. "Giant Elephant VS. Andro Force" (巨象対アンドロ軍団, Kyozō Tai Andoro Gundan): written by Naoko Miyake, directed by Seitaro Hara
19. "The Clown Robot of Terror" (恐怖のピエロロボット, Kyōfu no Piero Robotto): written by Tadashi Fukui, directed by Yoshiyuki Tomino
20. "Casshan Gets the Death Penalty" (死刑台のキャシャーン, Shikeidai no Kyashān): written by Harumi Tamura, directed by Yuji Nunokawa
21. "Robot Hijack" (ロボット・ハイジャック, Robotto Haijakku): written by Akiyoshi Sakai, directed by Yoshiyuki Tomino
22. "Runaway Robot, Romeo" (脱走ロボット・ロメオ, Dassō Robotto Romeo): written by Masaru Takesue, directed by Seitaro Hara
23. "Great Escape from the Robot Factory" (ロボット工場大脱出, Robotto Kōjō Dai Dasshutsu): written by Harumi Tamura, directed by Yuji Nunokawa
24. "Bounder Robot's Challenge" (バウンダー・ロボの挑戦, Baundā Robo no Chōsen): written by Kiichi Ishii, directed by Kazuyuki Okaseko
25. "Immortal Casshan" (不死身のキャシャーン", Fujimi no Kyashān): written by Jinzō Toriumi and Takao Koyama, directed by Hiroshi Sasagawa
26. "Casshan's Secrets" (キャシャーンの秘密, Kyashān no Himitsu): written by Jinzō Toriumi, directed by Yuji Nunokawa
27. "The Missing MF Gun" (消えたMF銃, Kieta Emu Efu Jyū): written by Naoko Miyake, directed by Hiroshi Sasagawa
28. "The Calvary of Anger" (怒りの騎馬隊, Ikari no Kibatai): written by Tadashi Fukui, directed by Yoshiyuki Tomino
29. "High-Heat Robot Neotaros" (高熱ロボ・ネオタロス, Konetsu Robo Neotarosu): written by Toshio Nagata, directed by Yuji Nunokawa
30. "The Premiere Robot Terminators" (ロボ退治ナンバーワン, Robo Taiji Nanbā Wan): written by Takeo Matsura and Hisao Ishihara, directed by Hiroshi Sasagawa
31. "The City That Creates Newly-Made Men" (新造人間を造る街, Shinzō ningen o tsukuru machi): written by Akiyoshi Sakai, directed by Yoshiyuki Tomino
32. "The Electric Punch of Tears" (涙の電光パンチ, Namida no Denkō Panchi): written by Tadashi Fukui, directed by Yuji Nunokawa
33. "Swanee in Danger"! (スワニー危機一髪, Suwanī Kiki Ippatsu): written by Akiyoshi Sakai, directed by Hiroshi Sasagawa
34. "Casshan VS. Robot Ace" (対ロボットエース, Tai Robotto Ēsu): written by Takao Koyama, directed by Yuji Nunokawa
35. "The Greatest Showdown on Earth" (地球最大の決戦, Chikyū Saidai no Kessen): written by Jinzō Toriumi, directed by Yuji Nunokawa

== Reception ==
The Encyclopedia of Science Fiction highlighted identity as a central theme of Casshan, particularly the protagonist's anxiety over whether he remains human after becoming an android and his fear of prejudice if his nature is revealed. Casshan's encountering both hostility toward robots and sympathetic humans allow the series to portray contrasting aspects of human nature, alongside his hope for peaceful coexistence between humans and machines. The encyclopedia criticized Braiking Boss as a one-dimensional antagonist whose attachment to Swanee is insufficiently explored, and also noted inconsistencies in the vulnerability of his robot forces.

== Legacy ==
The Mega Man video game series may take inspiration from Casshan, both featuring "robot" protagonists who are assisted by a helpful robotic dog companion (Rush and Friender, respectively) who can transform into useful items.

In Vanquish, developed by PlatinumGames, the art style is based on Casshern. In one of the boss fights, the main character drills through a robot by spinning in place at high speed, similarly to Casshern. Concerning the game's development, director Shinji Mikami is quoted as saying:

I was inspired by Casshern, so I wanted to make a game like that. If I went ahead and made the exact game I wanted, it probably would have been like Casshern, where you punch and kick the entire way through. But obviously if it were a game with only punching and kicking, I already did that with God Hand. So, I'm done with that, something else now. So this time he wanted to make a game where you defeat robots with guns. So now, you're going at it with guns, but he wanted to make sure the feeling of speed is still there, that was really important to him, so that's why he introduced the element of the sliding boost.

In addition, the protagonist of Vanquish has a facemask that periodically comes off to show his human side, much like Casshern himself. According to one of the game's character modelers, Yoshifumi Hattori, a support robotic companion dog was designed to fight along with the main character, including transforming into ability-enhancing armor. Although this dog was successfully modeled, it was cut from the finalized version of the game, along with another female android partner character. Raiden from Metal Gear Solid 4: Guns of the Patriots is also dressed like Casshern.

=== Manga adaptation ===
A manga adaptation of the original series, titled Casshern R, written by Chabo Higurashi and illustrated by Satoshi Shiki began serialization in Akita Shoten's Champion Red magazine on September 19, 2023. It announced the move to the Manga Cross website in November, with the publication resuming in April 2025.

== See also ==
- Infini-T Force – A 2017 crossover anime series
