= Higashi-ku =

Higashi-ku (東区) is the name of several wards located in various cities in Japan. The name literally translated to "Eastern District", and hence it is a very common ward name.

- Higashi-ku, Sapporo, Hokkaido Prefercture
- Higashi-ku, Niigata, Niigata Prefecture
- Higashi-ku, Hamamatsu, Shizuoka Prefecture
- Higashi-ku, Nagoya, Aichi Prefecture
- Higashi-ku, Sakai, Osaka Prefecture
- Higashi-ku, Okayama, Okayama Prefecture
- Higashi-ku, Hiroshima, Hiroshima Prefecture
- Higashi-ku, Fukuoka, Fukuoka Prefecture
- Higashi-ku, Kumamoto, Kumamoto Prefecture
- Higashi-ku of Osaka merged with Minami-ku and is now part of Chūō-ku
