= Yi Tung Shan =

Mountain in Hong Kong

- 二東山
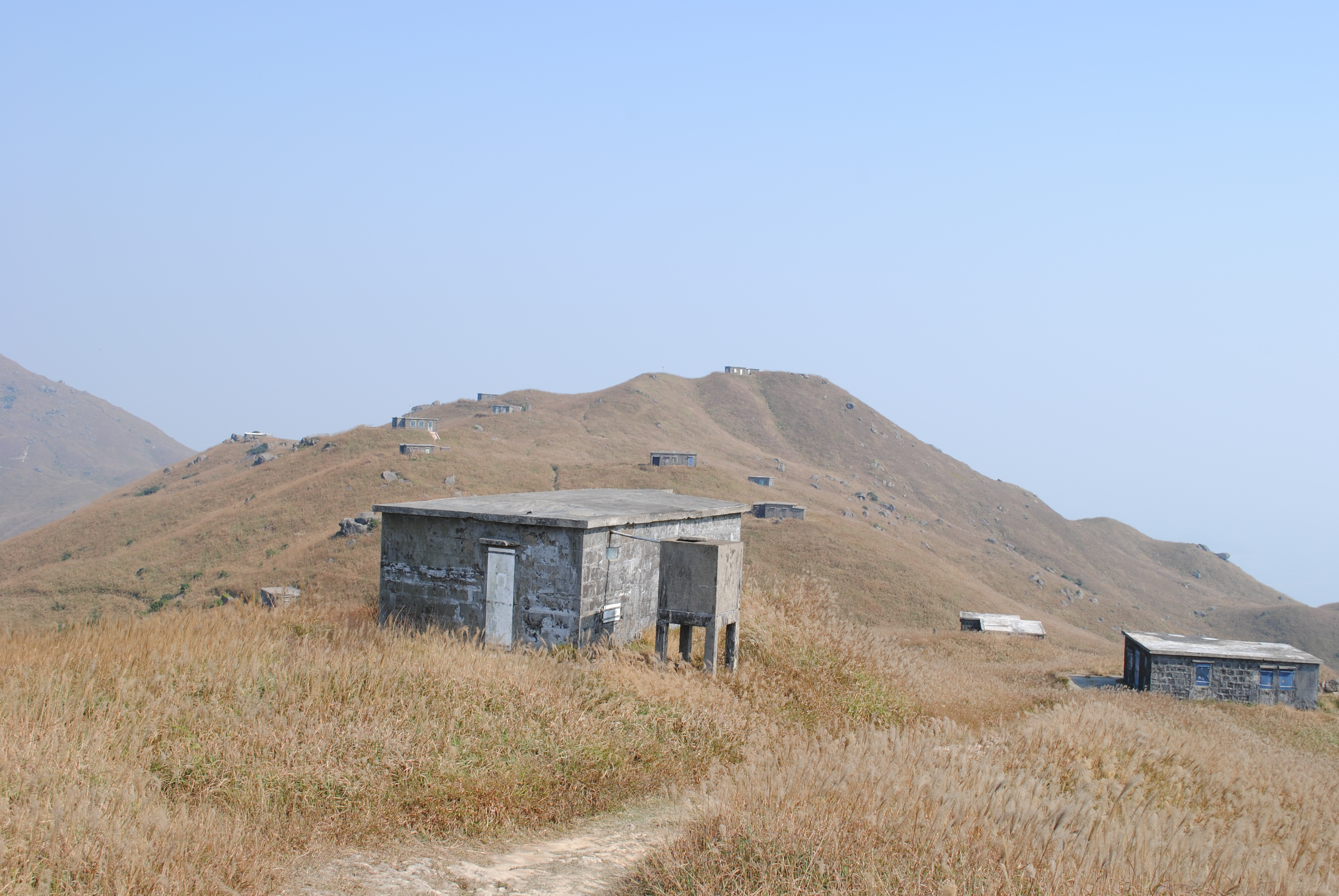
- View of Yi Tung Shan

Highest point
- Elevation: 747 m (2,451 ft)
- Coordinates: 22°15′34″N 113°58′0″E

Geography
- Location within Hong Kong

Yi Tung Shan (Chinese: 二東山) is the ninth highest mountain in Hong Kong. It is situated east of Sunset Peak on Lantau Island, and is 747 m in height. Stage 2 of The Lantau Trail runs along the north side of its peak.

== Name ==
While Sunset Peak's Cantonese name Tai Tung Shan literally means "Big East Mountain", Yi Tung Shan (Chinese: 二東山; Jyutping: Ji^{6} Tung^{1} Saan^{1}) literally means "Second East Mountain".

== See also ==
- List of mountains, peaks and hills in Hong Kong
- Sunset Peak
- Lantau Peak
- Lantau Trail
