= 東山 =

東山, meaning "eastern mountain(s)", may refer to:

Mandarin Chinese reading Dōngshān (also in simplified characters 东山):

- Dongshan County, Zhangzhou, Fujian, People's Republic of China
  - Dongshan Island, location of the Chinese Civil War Battle of Dongshan Island
- Dongshan District, Guangzhou, Guangdong, People's Republic of China
- Dongshan District, Hegang, Heilongjiang, People's Republic of China
- Dongshan District, Jieyang, Guangdong, People's Republic of China
- Dongshan District, Tainan, Taiwan, Republic of China
- Dongshan District, Urumqi, Xinjiang, People's Republic of China
- Shi Dongshan (1902–1955), Chinese film director

Cantonese Chinese reading Dūngsāan:

- Tung Shan (mountain), mountain in Hong Kong
- Yi Tung Shan, mountain in Hong Kong
- Sunset Peak (大東山), mountain in Hong Kong
- Tung Shan Mansion, building in Ko Shan Terrace, Taikoo Shing, Hong Kong

Korean reading Dongsan:

- Pen name of South Korean politician Yun Chi-Young
- Dongsan Station, Deokjin-gu, Jeonju, Jeollabuk-do, South Korea

Japanese on-yomi Tōsan or kun-yomi Higashiyama, as a placename:

- Higashiyama-chō, Chikusa-ku, Nagoya, Japan
- Higashiyama, Iwate, former town in Iwate, Japan
- Higashiyama-ku, Kyoto, Japan
  - Higashiyama period
- Higashiyama Line, Nagoya Municipal Subway System, Japan
- Higashiyama Station (Kyoto), Japan
- Higashiyama Station (Hokkaidō), Japan
- Higashiyama Station (Nara), Japan
- Tōsandō, old Japanese geographical region
  - Tōkai–Tōsan dialect

Japanese kun-yomi Higashiyama, as a name:

- Emperor Higashiyama (1675–1710), 113th Emperor of Japan
- Kaii Higashiyama (1908–1999), 20th-century Japanese artist.
- Noriyuki Higashiyama, member of J-pop group Shonentai
