= Kazuo Azuma =

Japanese shogi player (born 1955)

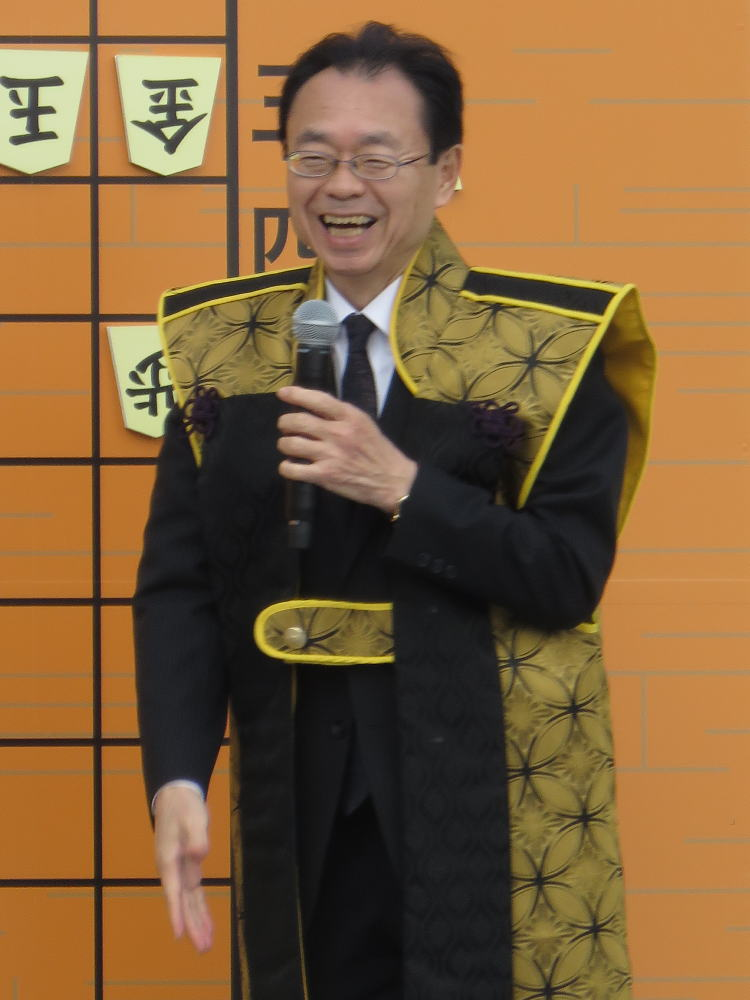
- Native name: 東和男
- Born: August 17, 1955 (age 70)
- Hometown: Sasebo, Nagasaki
- Nationality: Japanese

Career
- Achieved professional status: July 16, 1976 (aged 20)
- Badge Number: 128
- Rank: 8-dan
- Retired: May 17, 2021 (aged 65)
- Teacher: Kazukiyo Takashima (9-dan)
- Career record: 479–681 (.413)

Websites
- JSA profile page

Kazuo Azuma (東 和男, Azuma Kazuo; August 17, 1955) is a Japanese retired professional shogi player who achieved the rank of 8-dan. He is a former senior managing director of the Japan Shogi Association.

== Shogi professional ==
On April 1, 2021, the JSA posted on its official website that Azuma would be retiring upon completion of his last scheduled official game for the April 2021 – March 2022 shogi season because he had reached the mandatory retirement age of 65 years for Free Class players. His retirement became official on May 17, 2021, after losing his 34th Ryūō tournament Group 6 preliminary round game against Yūsei Koga. He finished with a career record of 479 wins and 681 losses for a winning percentage of 0.413.

=== Promotion history ===
The promotion history for Azuma is as follows:

- 6-kyū: 1971
- 1-dan: 1974
- 4-dan: July 16, 1976
- 5-dan: April 1, 1980
- 6-dan: April 1, 1984
- 7-dan: December 18, 1992
- 8-dan: April 1, 2015
- Retired: May 17, 2021

=== Awards and honors ===
Azuma received the JSA's "25 Years Service Award" in recognition of being an active professional for twenty-five years in 2001.

== JSA director ==
Azuma has served on the Japan Shogi Association's board of directors on a number of occasions. He first served as a director from 1995 to 2004, and then as a managing director from 2005 to 2006 and from 2011 to 2017.

In February 2017, Azuma was one of the two JSA board members to survive a no-confidence vote taken at an emergency meeting of the JSA membership as part of the fallout from 29th Ryūō challenger controversy. The following month he was elevated to senior managing director by the JSA board at a special meeting; he served in that capacity until the end of May 2017, but decided not to submit his name as a candidate for reelection as a board member at the JSA's 68th General Meeting on May 29, 2017.
