= Jinzō Toriumi =

Japanese screenwriter (1929–2008)

- Born: 鳥海 尽三; February 1, 1929; Takikawa, Hokkaido, Japan
- Died: January 17, 2008 (aged 78); Shinjuku, Tokyo, Japan
- Known for: Screenwriting, character design, illustration
- Notable work: Time Bokan series

Jinzō Toriumi (鳥海 尽三, Toriumi Jinzō; February 1, 1929 – January 17, 2008) was a Japanese screenwriter who first began his career during the "revolutionary era" of Japanese animation on Mach GoGoGo (Speed Racer), Science Ninja Team Gatchaman (Battle of the Planets/G-Force), and Yatterman.

Toriumi was born in the northern Japanese prefecture of Hokkaidō. After trying his hand at live-action at Nikkatsu, he began writing animation scripts at Mushi Productions for Mighty Atom (Astro Boy) in 1964. He went on to devote himself full-time to television at Tatsunoko Production in 1965. He contributed to Casshern, Tekkaman and Time Bokan. He later began writing for such Sunrise works as Armored Trooper VOTOMS, Yoroiden Samurai Troopers (Ronin Warriors), Mister Ajikko. He also wrote the novel versions of Gatchaman, Shin Heiyōden and Dororo, as well as the Anime Scenario Nyūmon (The Introduction to Anime Scriptwriting).

He used the Anime Scenario Nyūmon book when he became a vocational school teacher for future generations of scriptwriters. He also chaired Ohtori Koubou, a support organization for scriptwriters. He received the (Scenario) Scriptwriting Award from the Japan Writers Guild on May 26, 2000.

== Death ==
On January 17, 2008, he succumbed to liver cancer in a Tokyo hospital, aged 78. He was survived by his wife, Kazuyo.

== Filmography ==
=== Television ===
- series planner/head writer denoted in bold
- Astro Boy (1965)
- Space Ace (1965-1966)
- Sally the Witch (1967-1968)
- **Oraa Guzura Dado** (1967-1968)
- **Speed Racer** (1967-1968)
- Himitsu no Akko-chan (1969)
- **Judo Boy** (1969)
- **The Adventures of Hutch the Honeybee** (1970-1971)
- **Inakappe Taishō** (1970-1972)
- **Animentary: The Decision** (1971)
- **Science Ninja Team Gatchaman** (1972)
- **Pinocchio: The Series** (1972)
- Tamagon the Counselor (1972-1973)
- Demetan Croaker, The Boy Frog (1973)
- **Casshan** (1973-1974)
- **New Honeybee Hutch** (1974)
- **Urikupen Kyūjotai** (1974-1975)
- **Tekkaman: The Space Knight** (1975)
- **Time Bokan** (1975-1976)
- **Gowappa 5 Gōdam** (1976)
- **Paul's Miraculous Adventure** (1976-1977)
- **Temple the Balloonist** (1977-1978)
- **Yatterman** (1977-1979)
- **Uchū Majin Daikengo** (1978-1979)
- **Gatchaman II** (1978-1979)
- **Gatchaman Fighter** (1979-1980)
- **Zenderman** (1979-1980)
- Space Warrior Baldios (1980)
- Zukkoke Knight – Don De La Mancha (1980)
- Anime Yasei no Sakebi (1982)
- Armored Trooper Votoms (1983-1984)
- **Super Dimension Cavalry Southern Cross** (1984)
- Panzer World Galient (1984-1985)
- Oraa Guzura Dado (1987-1988)
- Ronin Warriors (1988-1989)
- **Mister Ajikko** (1988-1989): eps 70-99
- **The Adventures of Hutch the Honeybee** (1989-1990)
- **Yokoyama Mitsuteru Sangokushi** (1991-1992)
- **Jungle King Tar-chan** (1993-1994)
- **Ginga Sengoku Gun'yūden Rai** (1994-1995)

=== Film ===
- Science Ninja Team Gatchaman: The Movie (1978)

=== OVA ===
- Kentauros no Densetsu (1987)
