= East Hills Hostel =

Hostel near Liverpool, Australia

Coordinates: 33°58′15″S 150°58′38″E

East Hills Hostel was a migrant hostel, outside of Liverpool, Australia, on the outskirts of Hammondville. It was operated by Commonwealth Hostels Ltd. It was built to house migrant intakes from countries all over the world, but in its early inception was predominantly filled with British migrants.

The hostel was situated along Heathcote Road, approximately 2 km from East Hills, separated by the Georges River.
