= List of Kenichi: The Mightiest Disciple episodes =

Key visual for the series

Kenichi: The Mightiest Disciple is a Japanese anime television series based on Syun Matsuena's manga series Kenichi: The Mightiest Disciple. The series was produced by TMS Entertainment and directed by Hajime Kamegaki. It was broadcast on TV Tokyo from October 8, 2006, to September 29, 2007. The first opening theme for episodes 1–25 is "Be Strong", performed by Kana Yazumi, and the second opening theme for episodes 26–50 is "Yahhoo" (ヤッホー, Yahhō), performed by Diva × Diva (Miho Morikawa with Akira Asakura). The series' first ending theme for episodes 1–15 is "Kimi Ga Irukara" (君がいるから; lit. 'Because You Are There'), performed by Issei Eguchi. The second ending theme for episodes 16–25 is "Catch Your Dream", performed by Joanna Koike. The third ending theme for episodes 26–45 is "Run Over", performed by Joanna Koike. The fourth ending theme for episodes 46–49 is "Kokoro Kara no Message" (心からのメッセージ; lit. 'A Message from the Heart') is performed by Sakura. The series' last episode uses the first opening theme "Be Strong" by Kana Yazumi as ending theme.

In North America the series was licensed by Funimation in May 2008. The series was broadcast on Funimation Channel. The rights to the series expired in 2018. In December 2020, Discotek Media announced that they had licensed the anime television series and it would have an upscale release slated for 2021. The series returned to Funimation's streaming service in May 2021. Crunchyroll added the series to their catalog in September 2021.

An 11-episode original video animation (OVA) series produced by Brain's Base was released from March 14, 2012, to May 16, 2014. The story continues from the Ragnarok Arc entering the Yomi arc. The main cast for the OVA series is the same from those of the anime series except for Rie Kugimiya who replaced Tomoko Kawakami as Miu and Yuzuru Fujimoto who replaced Hiroshi Arikawa as her grandfather Hayato. The episodes later aired in 2014 on Tokyo MX and BS11, with the title Kenichi: The Mightiest Disciple – The Attack of Darkness (史上最強の弟子ケンイチ 闇の襲撃, Shijō Saikyō no Deshi Ken'ichi Yami no Shūgeki). Iori Nomizu performed the opening theme "Wish" (for episodes 4–9) and the ending themes "Glory Days" (for episodes 1–3) and "Breathless" (for episodes 4–9). During its television broadcast, the series featured the opening theme "Higher Ground", performed by Tomokazu Seki, and the same original second ending theme "Breathless", by Iori Nomizu. In January 2024, Discotek Media announced that they had licensed the OVA, and is set to be released on a Blu-ray set with an English dub on May 28 of the same year.

== Episodes ==
=== TV series (2006–07) ===
No.	Title	Original release date
1	"Ryōzanpaku: Where the Powerful Gather!" (Japanese: 梁山泊!豪傑の集いし場所)	October 8, 2006
While running late for class, Kenichi Shirahama bumps into new transfer student Miu Furinji. At the karate club, Kenichi is challenged by another student, Daimonji, to a match; the loser must leave the club. On the way home, Kenichi is awed when he sees Miu easily defeat a group of thugs. On Miu's advice, he heads to the Ryōzanpaku Dojo to train in martial arts. He meets Miu's grandfather Hayato Furinji (The Invincible Superman), Muay Thai fighter Apachai Hopachai (The Death God of the Muay Thai Underworld), Swordswoman Shigure Kōsaka (The Maiden of Weapons), Chinese martial artist Kensei Ma (The Master of All Chinese Martial Arts), Karate Master Shio Sakaki (The 100th Degree Street Fighter), and Jujutsu Master Akisame Kōetsuji (The Philosophical Judo Master).
2	"The Beginning of the Fight!" (Japanese: 一歩先へ!闘いの始まり)	October 15, 2006
Kenichi begins his extremely harsh training at the Ryōzanpaku Dojo under the guidance of Akisame. The training focuses on building strength and stamina. Concerned about Kenichi, Miu secretly teaches him a stepping technique to maneuver around a larger opponent. Kenichi practises the move constantly and is able to defeat Daimonji in the fight, though he admits he technically lost by using an illegal throwing move and quits the Karate club. Kenichi is then warned by ex bully Haruo Niijima that now he has defeated Daimonji other stronger fighters will likely want to fight him.
3	"Strength and Courage! For the Sake of Justice!" (Japanese: 力と勇気!正義を貫くために)	October 22, 2006
After watching Kenichi defeat Daimonji, Saijo Tsukuba, the strongest member of the karate club, becomes suspicious of Kenichi's abilities. At the school, Miu joins the girls' gymnastics club and unwillingly becomes the center of attention due to her remarkable abilities. Kenichi desperately tries to avoid Tsukuba, but is soon caught and is easily beaten. After Kenichi gives a heartfelt speech about his reasons for learning martial arts, Akisame decides to start teaching him martial arts techniques.
4	"Fight to Survive! It's Whether You Do It or You Don't!" (Japanese: ケンカ地獄!やるかやらないかだ)	October 29, 2006
Kenichi is once again beaten by Tsukuba despite his heavy training, and becomes depressed. With a desire to see him become stronger and more courageous Kenichi is also put through more rigorous training from the other masters Apachai and Kensei. Despite insisting that he will never train a student Sakaki decides to teach him a technique that a sports karate style user like Tsukuba is vulnerable to. Eventually Kenichi fights Tsukuba again, and this time emerges victorious by combining the techniques of all his masters into one fighting style. Only now his defeat of Tsukuba has attracted the attention of the criminal martial arts gang, Ragnarok.
5	"A Date?! You'd Better Score!" (Japanese: デート?きめちまえよ!)	November 5, 2006
Niijima adds fuel to the fire by making public Tsukuba's defeat and twisting the truth; as a result, Ragnarok, the strongest gang in the prefecture, targets Kenichi. Shortly after, all of the delinquents in the school search for him to bring him back to Kisara Nanjō, a Taekwondo fighter. Kenichi tries to avoid them by hiding in the gardening club during his breaks. At the dojo, the masters plan to help Kenichi find some much needed courage and arrange for him to take Miu on a date, but are interrupted when Kenichi has to save Niijima from Ragnarok thugs. It is later revealed that the masters purposely invited Ragnarok members to the movies to fight Kenichi so they could see how much he had improved.
6	"A Day at Ryōzanpaku! The Rooftop Dream!" (Japanese: 梁山泊での一日!屋根の上の夢)	November 12, 2006
Ragnarok's Takeda the Puncher is personally searching for Kenichi. Kenichi is now being continually targeted by strong opponents and Kenichi chooses to live at the Ryōzanpaku Dojo several days a week. He returns home to convince his eccentric gun-toting father to grant him permission; Kenichi returns to the dojo to continue his intensive training. Meanwhile his little sister, Honoka Shirahama, follows him to the dojo and sees his harsh training for herself. The Elder comments that Kenichi has somehow made everyone at the dojo a little happier.
7	"Hot Battle at the Gardening Club! A Return Match!" (Japanese: 熱闘園芸部リターンマッチ)	November 19, 2006
The dojo masters take turns training Kenichi. During Kenichi's shopping with Miu, he runs into Ragnarok member Koga the Kicker and his gang. Surrounded and outnumbered, the duo decide to fight back. Miu and Kenichi quickly put the delinquents out of commission which angers Kisara. Later, in school, Daimonji plans revenge on Kenichi and destroys all of the plants in the gardening club. Kenichi becomes outraged when his special Snow King orchid is crushed by Daimonji and due to his intense training defeats him with only a single punch. A few days later he is thrilled that his orchid has started growing again and resolves to continue growing himself.
8	"Amazing Bodies! The Mysterious Masters!" (Japanese: 脅威の肉体 謎の師匠達)	November 26, 2006
Furukawa Takashi, an aspiring Ragnarok member, intends to defeat Kenichi to get recognition by his peers. Being a weak fighter, he resorts to using a knife to attack Kenichi. Frightened by the weapon, Keniches freezes and Miu quickly comes to the rescue and disarms Furukawa. Embarrassed by the fact that Miu had to save him, and that his pants fell off, Kenichi considers himself a coward. Shigure offers to train him to defend against weapon users. Thanks to the training from Shigure, Kenichi is able to overcome his fear of knives. He encounters the group he faced earlier, who are questioning Izume and Himeno on his whereabouts, and Akisame demonstrates his monstrous power against them. Kenichi encounters Furukawa again but this time easily disarms him.
9	"Apapapa! Apachai's Training!" (Japanese: アパパパ〜!アパチャイの修行)	December 3, 2006
Apachai is afraid of hurting Kenichi and trains to be able to hold himself back so he can teach Kenichi Muay Thai. At school Takeda and Koga continue to search for Kenichi with their friend Ukita the Thrower. Niijima informs Kenichi the person he will most likely be fighting is Takeda, a former boxer. Apachai believes the Muay Thai fighting style will be most useful against a boxer, and the training begins. During Kenichi's sparring Apachai fails to adequately hold back and accidentally kills Kenichi who is quickly revived by Akisame. After his recovery Kenichi suffers from amnesia and does not remember what happened. Elder teaches Apachai a method of holding back. Since he forgot about being killed, Kenichi gets ready to be trained by Apachai again, who manages to hold back his fists but ends up knocking Kenichi through a wall with his foot.
10	"Go, Kenichi! A Boxer's Weakness!" (Japanese: 走れケンイチ!ボクサーの弱点)	December 10, 2006
Kenichi spars with Miu in preparation for his fight with Takeda. Shimayama and Tanaka plan on befriending Kenichi to become closer to Miu; Ukita takes them hostage in order to lure Kenichi out. Despite the fact that the two used to bully him, Kenichi comes to their rescue. He easily knocks out Ukita with a Muay Thai move before fighting Takeda who insists they fight using the rules of a boxing match. Kenichi tries his best to land a punch on Takeda, but Takeda is too quick for him even using only his right hand. After taking a good beating, Kenichi remembers the boxer's weakness: the low kick. The destructive power of the low kick takes effect, slowing down Takeda's attacks. The bell rings and they both take a break from fighting.
11	"The Fists of Betrayal! Takeda's Sorrowful Past!" (Japanese: 裏切りの拳 武田の悲しき過去)	December 16, 2006
Takeda reveals why he left pro boxing and why he despises people like Kenichi. After the bell rings again, the fight continues. The roof fence breaks and Kenichi saves Takeda from falling. Ukita regains consciousness and drags both of them back up. Miu notices from her class window and sees Takeda dangling from the roof, so she rushes out of class. But when she arrives she sees Kenichi knocked out, in a fit of rage she beats up both Ukita and Takeda. Kenichi brings both of the injured Ragnarok members to the dojo. Akisame-sensei treats everyone's injuries, including Takeda's paralyzed left arm, the injury that ruined his pro boxing career.
12	"A New Enemy! Shinnosuke Tsuji!" (Japanese: 新たなる敵!辻新之助)	December 24, 2006
Kenichi's father is both proud and depressed that Kenichi appears to have become stronger than he is. Kenichi feels uneasy about how he should express his feelings to Miu but all the advice he receives is totally useless. After Kisara hears of Takeda's defeat, Shinnosuke Tsuji is sent to kill Kenichi; however he invites Kenichi to join his gang instead. When Kenichi refuses and criticises his way of thinking, Shinnosuke challenges him to a fight.
13	"The Way of the Fight! The Rules of the Real Fight!" (Japanese: ケンカ殺法!実戦の掟)	January 7, 2007
All of Kenichi's attacks seem to have no effect on Shinnosuke. Even though Kenichi is stronger, his opponent has more fighting experience. Kensei stops Miu from interfering because it would hurt Kenichi's pride. Kenichi becomes careless and is knocked to the ground; Shinnosuke prepares to break his leg but Takeda comes to the rescue. Takeda carries Kenichi back to the Ryōzanpaku Dojo while Kensei secretly helps by preventing Shinnosuke's gang from following. To Kenichi's dismay his masters all criticize him for being defeated, because it will lead to further defeats. Niijima continues to spread his manipulated version of the news throughout the whole school. After his defeat has been revealed to everyone, he is constantly chased around by school delinquents. The masters decide that Kenichi should be taken in as a true disciple of the Ryōzanpaku Dojo, meaning he should live there permanently.
14	"Dedicated Training! And a Nearby Hot Spring Bath!" (Japanese: 命懸けの修行!混浴もついてます)	January 14, 2007
After his defeat against Tsuji, the masters decided to have Kenichi live with them, allowing for daily training. At first they are unusually nice to Kenichi who quickly becomes suspicious. After announcing their plan to have him live in the dojo Kenichi immediately tries to escape until Kensei persuades him with the idea that he would essentially be living with Miu. Kenichi moves into the dojo and is immediately put through hellish training that almost kills him several times. He decides to escape again but is convinced to stay by an encouraging letter from his father. Kensei later gives Kenichi "special training" by helping him peek on Miu and Shigure in the outdoor bath, only to end up sharing the bath with Elder instead.
15	"Honoka Infiltrates Ryōzanpaku!" (Japanese: ほのか潜入!梁山泊だじょ)	January 21, 2007
Kenichi continues with his new hellish training. Honoka decides to infiltrate the Ryōzanpaku Dojo by herself to make sure Kenichi is okay, and after meeting his masters and seeing his sheer determination, decides that the dojo is an acceptable place for her brother to stay. She also becomes good friends with Apachai and Shigure and promises to visit every day to play Othello.
16	"Ryōzanpaku Faces the Greatest Crisis?!" (Japanese: 梁山泊最大の危機!!?)	January 28, 2007
When Miu's jealous classmate Chihiro learns Kenichi and Miu are living together she tells homeroom teacher Fukujirō Yasunaga, hoping to get Miu expelled. Fukujirō decides to pays a visit to the Ryōzanpaku Dojo with his assistant Kyōko Ono to check on Miu's living conditions. Miu reveals to Kenichi and the masters that in order to get into school she lied about having parents on her school records. With her grandfather and Akisame both absent she enlists Sakaki and Shigure to play her parents and orders Kenichi, Apachai and Kensei to stay hidden. However the masters end up causing all kinds of trouble until the timely arrival of the Elder. Despite learning Kenichi does in fact live with Miu Fukujirō is happy to learn that Kenichi is a student of Akisame, who is also a famous artist, and concludes Miu's home life is acceptable. Kenichi decides to give the exhausted Miu a break by doing her chores while she sleeps.
17	"Protect the Name! Attack of the Dojo Challengers!" (Japanese: 守れ看板!道場破り襲来!)	February 4, 2007
Kenichi finds that he cannot land a successful hit on Miu for fear of her counterattack. Honoka spends the day with Apachai and Shigure. Sakaki lectures Kenichi on the importance of landing the first blow in any fight. While Kenichi and Miu are left alone rivals from a karate Dojo break into Ryōzanpaku Dojo to challenge their karate master, Sakaki, but with only Kenichi and Miu present, Miu declares she will fight in Sakaki's place. However, Kenichi finds his courage and steps in to protect Miu and manages to land an impressive blow to his much more skilled opponent. Sakaki then arrives to protect his student and shows his own monstrous power by defeating the entire group of challengers in only a few seconds. Kenichi is praised for managing to hit his opponent but realises Sakaki had been secretly watching the entire fight. Kenichi also learns how the dojo makes money, first by charging their challengers money to take part in fights, and then charging them a second time for treatment at Akisame and Kensei's medical clinic.
18	"Paradise? To the Mysterious Furinji Island!" (Japanese: 楽園???秘境·風林寺島へ!)	February 11, 2007
Kenichi begs the masters for a day off so they decide to take a short vacation to Furinji Island owned by the Elder and even take Honoka with them. Kenichi is forced to row the boat to get there with only the thought of Miu in a bikini as his motivation. On the island the masters try to force Kenichi to overcome his fear by jumping from a high cliff into the ocean with the promise that if he does so he can relax for the rest of the vacation. However, Kenichi does not know how to swim and instead runs away into the forest where he meets Shigure who successfully teaches him how to swim and even smiles for the first time. Returning to the cliff Kenichi jumps without fear when he sees Honoka being attacked by sharks which Kenichi tries to fight off. They are both saved by the Elder, who can run on water. Kenichi is praised by the Elder who remarks Kenichi reminds him of himself when he was a young man.
19	"The Strongest of the Ragnarok! Here Come the Eight Greatest Fists!" (Japanese: ラグナレク最強の者 八拳豪見参!)	February 18, 2007
Kisara officially becomes one of the deadly Eight Fists, Ragnarok's highest ranked members. The masters debate moving Kenichi on to even more advanced techniques. Kisara is attacked by Tsuji until Kenichi, unaware of who Kisara is, steps in to protect her and knocks Tsuji unconscious when he was not looking. Kisara is impressed with Kenichi's skills but surprised that he shows concern for the injured Tsuji. Later Niijima witnesses only 3 of Ragnarok's members easily defeat a gang of 50 people. Tsuji challenges Kenichi to another fight which Kenichi wins easily. Beaten, Tsuji disbands his own gang, until his gang insist they are Tsuji's friends and will stay with him. Tsuji warns Kenichi about a dangerous Ragnarok member, Hermit. Kenichi decides to begin the advanced technique training.
20	"Takeda's Crisis! The Law of Retribution!" (Japanese: 武田の危機!報復の掟!)	February 25, 2007
Niijima continues to spread lies around the school. After becoming one of the eight fists, Kisara starts to hunt down Takeda for betraying her. Kenichi begins his advanced technique training. Takeda is still receiving treatment from Akisame and witnesses for himself Kenichi's sheer determination in training to overcome his lack of natural ability. Kenichi insists on helping Takeda if he is ever in trouble and swaps phone numbers. Takeda is cornered by Kisara, Ukita, Koga and other Ragnarok members but decides not to get Kenichi involved. However, Kenichi ends up hearing the fight when Takeda's phone dials him by mistake. Ukita betrays Kisara and fights alongside Takeda. With help from Kensei, Kenichi and Miu learn where the fight is.
21	"Unforgivable! Kenichi's Fists of Fury!" (Japanese: 許さない!!ケンイチ怒りの拳!)	March 4, 2007
Kisara knocks out Ukita and fights Takeda by herself. Kenichi and Miu arrive in time to prevent Koga from breaking Ukita's arm. Kenichi fights every gang member while Miu fights with Kisara. Ending up trapped Kenichi successfully defends himself with one of Sakaki's advanced techniques. Miu knocks out Kisara. Kenichi is then saved by the arrival of Niijima who has been secretly forming his own gang to take on Ragnarok, the Shinpaku Alliance, and plans on making Kenichi his Assault Commander.
22	"Gather, Young Men! The New Shinpaku Alliance!" (Japanese: 集え若人!新白連合結成!)	March 11, 2007
Niijima outlines his master plan to build up the Shinpaku Alliance until he eventually rules the world. Takeda and Ukita thank Kenichi for his help. Kisara is ordered by Hermit to leave the new Shinpaku Alliance alone. Kisara instead decides to target Miu. Niijima and Shinpaku Alliance are attacked by Hermit, an extremely powerful fighter, and Niijima escapes using his Personal Niijima-style Escape Art. Niijima later follows Kenichi to Ryozanpaku Dojo and sneaks inside where he is terrified by the masters. He continues his plan for world conquest.
23	"Assault! The Next Door Ryōzanpaku!" (Japanese: 突撃!となりの梁山泊!)	March 18, 2007
Kenichi's classmate Izumi has a crush on him but feels she cannot compete with Miu. Niijima steps in with a devious plan and takes her to Ryozanpaku Dojo. Izumi becomes concerned for Kenichi and ends up in a catfight with Miu that even terrifies the masters. Izumi decides to train at the Dojo alongside Kenichi but cannot perform even a single push-up. Izumi apologises to Miu and leaves with a new appreciation of Kenichi and determined to overcome her own fear. Meanwhile the masters wonder how many push-ups Kenichi can do while Kenichi begs for mercy.
24	"The Captured Heart! Miu's Juliet!" (Japanese: 奪われたハート!美羽のジュリエット)	March 25, 2007
Natsu Tanimoto, the president of the drama club, invites Miu to perform "Romeo and Juliet" together at the school's play, much to Kenichi's despair. Kensei teaches Kenichi several advanced Chinese techniques. Miu practices for the play. Kenichi ends up protecting Tanimoto from delinquents and learns only some of the numerous lies Niijima has been spreading. Niijima is convinced there is more to Tanimoto than meets the eye. Despite being innocent Kenichi ends up being blamed for putting the delinquents in hospital with serious injuries.
25	"Stand Strong, Kenichi! Miu's Kiss!" (Japanese: 死守せよケンイチ!美羽のくちびる)	April 1, 2007
Due to the rumours about him Kenichi continues to be depressed, which is not helped by Miu's continued closeness with Tanimoto. Eager to have a rematch with Miu, Kisara and her crew plan to attack Miu the night of the play. With her grandfather away again Kenichi promises to watch the play. Miu is also happy when the masters turn up to watch. Kenichi has second thoughts about attending when he realises he would have to watch Miu kissing Tanimoto on stage. He meets Kisara on the way home and prevents them from ruining Miu's play, though he refuses to fight back against Kisara as he swore to never hit women. Kisara remembers similar events from her childhood and viciously beats Kenichi.
26	"The Stripped Mask! Hermit's True Identity!" (Japanese: 剥された仮面!ハーミットの正体!)	April 8, 2007
Realising Kenichi will not give up Kisara angrily leaves. Miu's play is a success. Apachai sneaks away and ends up winning a basketball game. Kenichi discovers that Tanimoto is not as nice as he appears and plans on stealing Miu from him. The masters allow Miu and Kenichi to have a moment together where Miu inquires about a Yin-Yang badge Kenichi wears but cannot remember where he got it. Hermit suddenly appears and ends up fighting Kenichi on top of a moving bus with Sakaki and Kensei following. Hermit reveals he is really Tanimoto and received his training from Kensei's brother, Sougetsu Ma. Kensei notes that Tanimoto is using a lethal fighting style and is trying to kill Kenichi rather than defeat him. However, thanks to his harsh training Kenichi manages to survive despite receiving what should have been a fatal strike to the head. Refusing Kenichi's offer of friendship Hermit attacks but Kenichi uses Kensei's advanced technique and knocks them both from the bus. Tanimoto escapes. Kenichi insists that he will defeat Tanimoto in the future. Kensei and Sakaki are proud Kenichi appears to be growing up.
27	"Hard vs. Soft! Once-in-a-Lifetime Quarrel Between Brothers!" (Japanese: 剛VS柔!空前絶後の兄弟喧嘩!)	April 15, 2007
Kensei Ma sneaks out of the Ryōzanpaku Dojo to solve a family problem, but is followed by Kenichi to a restaurant owned by Kensei's uncle Ryō "Hakubi" Ma. Kensei learns his brother Sougetsu is back in the country. Kensei is attacked by a young woman who turns out to be his daughter, Renka Ma, who is determined to return him to China where not only does he have a wife and several children, he is also the absent leader of the Phoenix Martial Arts Sect with over 10,000 disciples. Renka is surprised someone as weak as Kenichi can take such heavy beatings. They go to a meeting where Sougetsu attacks a mob boss and viciously beats Renka when she tries to stop him, uncaring that she is his niece. Kensei arrives and challenges Sougetsu to a fight to the death. The mob boss sets fire to the building. Kensei defeats Sougetsu but does not kill him. Kenichi tries to convince Sougetsu to leave with them but he refuses and stays inside the burning building. Kensei and Kenichi return to Ryozanpaku Dojo. Renka is furious her father escaped again and becomes more determined than ever to bring him back to China. She also expresses an interest in bringing Kenichi as well.
28	"Here Comes the Shock Troop Commander! Battle Royal at the Restaurant!" (Japanese: 斬り込み隊長参上!乱闘レストラン)	April 22, 2007
Kenichi receives an anonymous love letter of which Miu is immediately jealous. Niijima tries to recruit Takeda and Ukita to Shinpaku Alliance. Miu overhears Kenichi talk about his feelings for her with the masters and is pleased that Kenichi plans on politely turning down his anonymous admirer in favour of his friendship with her. Niijima and Shinpaku Alliance meet Ragnarok member Loki at a restaurant but find themselves outnumbered. Kenichi's admirer had invited him to the same restaurant and he ends up fighting Loki alongside Takeda and Ukita who were passing by. Kenichi defeats Loki by combining the moves of his masters into one technique. However, Takeda realises it was not Loki, but a Loki subordinate in disguise. Kenichi, Takeda and Ukita realise they all received the same anonymous love letter. Niijima reveals he sent all the letters to bring all three fighters to the same place in time for the fight with Loki. Elsewhere the real Loki watches security footage of the fight.
29	"The Fearsome Siegfried! Prelude to Destruction!" (Japanese: 恐るべしジーク!破滅へのプレリュード)	April 29, 2007
Niijima informs Kenichi about Ragnarok member Siegfried, also known as the Immortal Composer, who always recovers from any damage he receives and composes music using his fights as inspiration. Niijima spies on Loki and Siegfried and is captured by Loki's subordinate Number 20, though he escapes by groping her breasts. Siegfried chases him, and though Niijima manages to knock him down with his extendable baton, Siegfried is unhurt and captures Niijima. At the docks Loki, Siegfried and Number 20 plan on hiding Niijima on a ship out of the country. Kensei and Apachai both manage to locate Niijima using unorthodox methods. At the docks Siegfried insists on fighting Kenichi alone, promising to tell him Niijima's location if their fight proves inspiring enough for his next composition. Loki escapes so Miu follows and fights the fleeing Number 20. Kenichi easily knocks Siegfried down several times, only for him to rise unhurt and deliver devastating counter attacks, all while composing beautiful music.
30	"The Results of Training! Align Forward Half!" (Japanese: 修行の成果!小さく前にならえ!!)	May 6, 2007
Kenichi struggles to hold off Siegfried. Miu easily defeats Number 20, despite a major wardrobe malfunction, but fails to find Loki or Niijima. Kenichi finds himself on the defensive and, remembering a lesson from Sakaki, breaks off the fight and begins acting strangely, deliberately throwing off the pace of the fight, confusing Siegfried. Kenichi throws a fake punch but Siegfried falls down anyway. Kenichi realises that Siegfried fights by avoiding being hit, acting injured and then counterattacking to confuse his opponents, giving the impression he can always recover. Kenichi steps close to Siegfried, who allows him to do so, confident he can counter any move. Combining all his masters training on how to punch Kenichi invents a brand new punch allowing him to powerfully strike multiple times with a single hit. Siegfried is unable to dodge or counterattack and is knocked unconscious. Miu scolds Kenichi for using such a dangerous move. The ship leaves before Kenichi can save Niijima. On the ship Niijima gets drunk off a shipment of Sake, dresses as an alien and terrifies the crew. Loki and Number 20 give a report of Siegfried's defeat to Ragnarok's First Fist, Odin, who appears to know Kenichi. At Ryozanpaku Dojo the masters read a news article about a ship that was hijacked by an alien. Niijima washes up on the beach of Furinji Island.
31	"Honoka Will Help You!" (Japanese: ほのか、お手伝いするじょ!)	May 13, 2007
Kenichi has never once beaten Miu at sparring and believes that because he has no natural talent for martial arts he will never become a master no matter how much he trains. Apachai cannot beat Honoka at Othello. Sakaki and Kensei both play against Apachai only to lose straight away. Even Akisame only wins by a single point, which shocks everybody who had no idea Apachai was a master of Othello. Kenichi realises that dedication to his training is all he needs to improve and vows to do so. He wonders if Honoka, who has never lost to Apachai, might be able to beat Akisame. Akisame practises playing Othello. Tanimoto, aka Hermit, returns to Ragnarok, having been training for his rematch with Kenichi. Honoka sees delinquents harassing Tanimoto and tries to protect him. Tanimoto ends up saving Honoka, unaware she is Kenichi's sister, and takes her to his home when she is injured. Honoka feels sorry for him when she realises he lives alone. She insists on cooking for him, despite Tanimoto's demands for her to leave. Tanimoto has a flashback of his sister, and though Honoka's cooking is nearly inedible he eats it but becomes angry when Honoka finds a picture of his sister. Honoka teases him over the face he makes when he is fighting, making him laugh. At Ryozanpaku Dojo Honoka beats Apachai at Othello again. The masters wonder if, with training, she might be a better martial artist than Kenichi.
32	"Honoka's in Danger! Loki's Plot!" (Japanese: ほのかの危機!ロキの謀略)	May 20, 2007
Kenichi's training is increased in preparation for learning the Double Palm Strike. Kensei defeats a challenger using the Double Palm but accidentally injures Kenichi when the defeated challenger lands on top of him. Kenichi runs away from Ryozanpaku Dojo and returns home, lying to his parents about his reasons for leaving. Though Miu and the masters are upset Kenichi ran away Akisame believes Kenichi will return when he feels ready. Honoka visits Tanimoto. A flashback reveals Tanimoto and his sick sister Kaede were adopted by a heartless businessman who promised to pay for his sisters treatments if Tanimoto learned how to one day run the company. Loki and Number 20 visit Tanimoto with plans to defeat Kenichi from Odin's master, Sage Fist. Honoka reveals she is Kenichi's sister and is kidnapped by Loki. At school Kenichi avoids Miu and learns Takeda and Ukita joined Shinpaku Alliance. Niijima is contacted by Loki through his website revealing they have Honoka and challenging Kenichi to a fight. Kenichi, Takeda and Ukita immediately head to the meeting place, an old church, with Miu joining them. Akisame and Sakaki follow them secretly. At the church Tanimoto disagrees with Loki's plan to use Honoka but cannot disobey an order from Sage Fist. Kenichi arrives at the church first and after breaking down the gate challenges Tanimoto.
33	"Strike, Kenichi! Fists do the Talking!" (Japanese: ぶつけろケンイチ!拳は語る!)	June 3, 2007
While Akisame and Sakaki watch from a distance Kenichi prepares to fight Tanimoto. Miu, Takeda and Ukita are attacked by Loki's lookalikes who are easily defeated. Kenichi and Tanimoto fight each other viciously with neither able to gain the upper hand. Akisame and Sakaki bet on who will win. Tanimoto reveals how he and his sick sister were adopted and he was forced to learn to run the family business by his heartless father. But then his father fell in love with and married the doctor who was treating his sister and for a time they were happy. Only the doctor betrayed them and allowed his sister to become very sick before poisoning his father for his money. She was arrested and Tanimoto inherited the business but refused to trust anyone ever again. Kenichi refuses to pity him and they fight once more. Miu and the others arrive at the church. Kenichi refuses to believe that trusting others makes you weak and, using the faith he has in his friends and masters, summons the strength to deliver a Double Palm Strike, knocking Tanimoto down. Before they can fight again they are interrupted by Loki who is holding Honoka hostage on the church roof.
34	"Don't Give In! The Words Left by a Loved One!" (Japanese: 負けないで!愛する人が残した言葉)	June 10, 2007
Loki taunts Tanimoto by revealing that his adoptive father was killed by the corrupt board of directors who manipulated him into signing the company over to them so they could steal everything for themselves. Eventually the board of directors decided to simply kill Tanimoto, however Tanimoto was saved by Sage Fist who ruthlessly killed Tanimoto's attackers and told him to go and learn martial arts. With Number 20 holding Honoka at knifepoint Kenichi refuses to fight back, instead entering a defensive karate stance to protect himself while Loki viciously attacks him, which impresses Akisame and Sakaki. Honoka's crying reminds Tanimoto of when his sister finally died and he rushes to defend Honoka by knocking Number 20 unconscious, though he is stabbed in the process. With Honoka safe Kenichi is able to fight back and knocks Loki down, who kicks Tanimoto out of Ragnarok for disobeying the orders of Sage Fist. The fight is suddenly interrupted by Odin.
35	"There's No One in Our Way! Now is the Time to Settle the Fight!" (Japanese: 邪魔者なし!今こそ決着のとき)	June 17, 2007
Odin greets Kenichi as an old friend, though Kenichi does not remember him, and promises that soon the promise they made as children will be kept. He then admonishes Loki for lying about Sage Fist, who had not actually given any orders. Loki flees with Number 20. Odin offers to let Tanimoto stay in Ragnarok, but he refuses. Odin leaves, promising they will be enemies the next time they met. With Honoka safe Tanimoto insists on finishing their fight. The knife wound Tanimoto got from Number 20 weakens him and Kenichi is able to perform a counterattack. Through sheer willpower Tanimoto is able to remain standing. Kenichi realises Tanimoto had passed out even though he was still standing. Akisame and Sakaki reveal themselves and take Kenichi and Tanimoto to Ryozanpaku Dojo for treatment. Kensei learns from Tanimoto that his brother Sougetsu was a brutal master who used only the harshest methods to train Tanimoto how to kill without remorse, though he was always happy that Kensei was living a good life where he could not. Tanimoto bumps into Honoka while leaving and forbids her from visiting his house again, though he smiles when she once again teases him over his fighting face. He also meets the Elder who advises him not to go through life alone. At school Tanimoto returns to class and clears up the rumours about Kenichi beating up the delinquents, though he insists he will only stay at school until he defeats Kenichi.
36	"Miu vs. Renka! The Love Triangle Creates a Storm!" (Japanese: 美羽VS蓮華!!嵐を呼ぶトライアングル)	June 24, 2007
Kenichi wants to learn a death blow, but the Elder insists that as a martial artist Kenichi must invent his own. Kensei's daughter Renka appears having learned about Ryozanpaku Dojo from Hakubi. Miu overhears Renka planning on taking both Kensei and Kenichi to China and is immediately jealous. Renka decides to stay at Ryozanpaku Dojo, which terrifies the masters. Renka's attempts to get closer to Kenichi make Miu angry at him. The masters find the situation hilarious. Miu goes to Kenichi's room to apologise but ends up angry Renka is already there. However she is happy when she hears Kenichi say he respects her as a martial artist and his goal is to one day be strong enough to protect her. Miu and Renka almost end up fighting. Renka tricks Kenichi into a date at a swimming pool, hoping to get him to herself, however the masters tag along with Miu and Honoka. Despite Renka's objections Kenichi is made to continue his training in the pool. Two of Hakubi's disciples, Genson Ryū and Kōan Shokatsu, appear to find Renka, so she tricks Miu into thinking they are Chinese Mafia. Miu fights them but is hindered when her bikini top comes loose. Seeing her hurt a furious Kenichi steps in to protect Miu and defeats Koan and then fights Genson before the Elder steps in to prevent them from drowning. At Ryozanpaku Dojo apologies are made about the misunderstanding and Renka decides to return to the restaurant to deal with Hakubi who has been attacking mafia members every time he gets drunk. Before she leaves Renka tells Kenichi he already has a death blow she has seen him use several times, though he has not realised it yet. She leaves determined to steal Kenichi from Miu.
37	"Dangerous Trap! Let's Have Sumo Chanko Stew Together!" (Japanese: 危険な誘惑 一緒にちゃんこを!)	July 1, 2007
Ragnarok member Thor plans to develop his Sumo wrestling into a practical martial art. Loki plots against Odin by planning to replace him with Berserker. Niijima reveals he knows what Kenichi's death blow is, a combination of moves from every martial art Kenichi is learning, (a Karate punch, followed by a Muay Thai knee strike, followed by a Chinese head-butt and finished by a Judo throwing move). Niijima suggests Kenichi go on the offensive by attacking a Ragnarok member. Kenichi asks his masters advice on being the one to instigate violence. The masters are happy Kenichi has matured enough to ask such a question but insist that finding his own answer is an important part of his training. Kenichi decides it is acceptable to attack as long as he fights with honour. Kenichi and Shinpaku Alliance head to an underground fighting arena run by Thor where Kenichi challenges him to a match. If Kenichi wins, Thor must leave Ragnarok, if Thor wins Kenichi must become Thor's disciple and help him make Sumo into a real martial art. They enter a ring that has been dug into the ground so fighters cannot be thrown out, and instead must be beaten unconscious. Due to his thick muscles Kenichi is unable to hurt Thor with his normal attacks and gets hit by him several times. Kenichi uses his death blow on Thor but struggles to throw such a heavy opponent. Somehow Kenichi finds the strength to lift Thor completely off the ground and throw him out of the hole, which counts as Thor leaving the ring and being defeated. As an honourable martial artist Thor admits defeat and swears to leave Ragnarok and give up on his dreams to develop Sumo wrestling, though Kenichi points out he only asked Thor to leave Ragnarok and encourages him to keep following his dream.
38	"Cute Kitten! Hand-to-Hand Battle Among Women!" (Japanese: かわいい子猫 女たちの肉弾戦!)	July 8, 2007
Thor is punished by the rest of the Eight Fists after he chooses to leave Ragnarok. Kisara's unwillingness to join in the punishment makes the others suspicious of her loyalty. Later, Kenichi and Miu spot Kisara taking care of an abandoned kitten, and decide to help her find a home for it. However the Valkyrie, female fighters trained by Ragnarok member Freya in the use of weapons, see Kisara talking to Kenichi and report her to Freya as a traitor. Miu ends up depressed she could not bring the kitten to Ryozanpaku Dojo. Concerned for Miu Kensei and Shigure offer to cook dinner while Akisame and Sakaki interrogate Kenichi on why Miu is upset. Miu sees Kisara try and fail to have the kitten adopted and reveals she has loved cats since she was little, while Kisara had a kitten as a child that was killed by a dog. Kisara is suddenly attacked by the Valkyrie. Kenichi learns that the masters would happily let Miu keep the kitten and he rushes to tell her with Shigure's mouse Tochūmaru tagging along. Kisara tries to fight back but is hindered by having to defend the kitten as well as herself. Kenichi finds Miu in time to see Kisara losing the fight. Kisara hands Miu the injured kitten and insists she get it to a vet.
39	"Shigure's Personal...Lesson!" (Japanese: 危険な誘惑 一緒にちゃんこを!)	July 15, 2007
While Miu rushes to find a vet. Kenichi attacks the Valkyrie to protect Kisara but is immediately apologetic for hitting a woman and goes on the defensive rather than fight back. He is attacked by Freya using an unseen move. The Valkyrie beat Kenichi severely but are shocked when he manages to stand up. Still unwilling to fight back Kenichi uses Niijima's Personal Niijima-style Escape Art to flee with the unconscious Kisara. At Ryozanpaku Dojo Shigure and Kensei manage to cook an unorthodox meal, although no one feels comfortable eating with Kenichi and Miu missing. They are surprised that Shigure plans on eating with them at the table instead of alone in her room. The Elder is happy Kenichi has such a positive effect on her. Tochūmaru sends Shigure a firework signal warning her Kenichi is in trouble. The vet assures Miu the kitten is merely unconscious so she rushes to help Kenichi. Kenichi is saved by Shigure who is angrier with Kenichi for missing dinner than she is with the Valkyrie for attacking him. Kisara wakes up and announces she hates people who fight with weapons. Shigure knocks her out again to prevent her from being injured further. Despite Kenichi's warnings the Valkyrie insist on fighting Shigure who is convinced by Kenichi not to kill anybody and to use a rice spoon instead of her sword. Shigure skilfully uses her rice spoon to destroy the Valkyrie's weapons and clothes. The embarrassed Valkyrie flee. Kisara confronts Freya and quits Ragnarok. Shigure, Kenichi and Miu return to Ryozanpaku Dojo in time to prevent Apachai passing out from hunger. Kenichi remembers he was supposed to tell Miu she could keep the kitten but is too late as the vet already had it adopted. Kisara and Miu punish Kenichi together.
40	"The Place the Promise was Made! Everything Started Here!" (Japanese: 約束の地! すべてはここから)	July 22, 2007
Tanimoto tells Kenichi about the Eight Fists top 3 fighters, Odin, Berserker and Freya and that Odin was personally trained by Sage Fist. Tochūmaru tries to steal Kenichi's Yin-yang badge. Kenichi can only remember he got the badge when he was 6 years old by trading it with someone for a cat badge. Miu takes Kenichi to find the store where he got the badge and reveals she spent part of her childhood living in the same area with her grandfather and together they find the store. Miu reveals she originally bought the Yin-yang badge as a little girl but traded it to Kenichi for the cat badge. Kenichi remembers he had met Miu when he was 6 years old. They are suddenly interrupted by Odin who calls a temporary truce. At first he is friendly but becomes angry when Kenichi not only cannot remember their promise but cannot even remember his real name. Kenichi ends up remembering Odin is actually Ryūto Asamiya, his childhood friend he has not seen in 10 years. He also remembers Ryūto bought the cat badge Kenichi ended up trading to Miu and together he and Ryuto watched the 6 year old Miu beat up 3 thugs trying to rob the store, which led to Kenichi and Ryuto making their promise, to train in martial arts until they became as strong as Miu. Kenichi then introduces Ryuto to the grown up Miu. Ryuto becomes angry at Kenichi's request to end the fight between Ragnarok and Shinpaku Alliance and challenges Kenichi to a fight, swearing to make him remember their real promise.
41	"Terror of the Sphere of Control! A Dragon Descends!" (Japanese: 制空圏の恐怖! 龍は舞い降りた!)	July 29, 2007
Kenichi fights Ryuto but he is on a completely different level and knocks Kenichi down without touching him. Sakaki and Apachai take Honoka to a restaurant where Sakaki knocks out a thug also without touching him, explaining to Honoka that he used his Qi to knock out his opponent with his powerful killing intent, the same move Ryuto used on Kenichi. Despite being injured Kenichi uses his own Qi to stand, shocking Ryuto. Miu explains, as Kenichi is routinely beaten up by masters who are far stronger than Ryuto, he has gained a tremendous level of resistance to physical damage. Despite this Kenichi is unable to get past Ryuto's "Seikuken", the area around his body over which Ryuto has perfect control, allowing for perfect defence and offense everywhere within the reach of his arms and legs, and as Kenichi has no real killing intent he is unable to break the Seikuken, even with his death blow. Ryuto steals his Yin-yang badge and replaces it with his own identical Yin-yang badge he also bought 10 years ago after Kenichi did something he found unforgivable, claiming it to be the badge of a loser. He leaves with Kenichi's badge. Niijima starts a rumour that Tanimoto has joined Shinpaku Alliance, when in reality it was Siegfried, now a member of Shinpaku Alliance, wearing Tanimoto's Hermit clothes. At Ryozanpaku Dojo the masters mercilessly tease Kenichi over his defeat until he regains his fighting spirit. The Elder reassures Kenichi that even though he lost he learned more about himself than he would have done had he won.
42	"Elder 's Super Express! Do-or-Die Secluded Tour in the Mountains!" (Japanese: 年長者「sの特別な訓練! 山のをするか、または死になさい!)	August 5, 2007
Kenichi is angry over losing to Odin and decides to train to put more killing intent into his attacks until the Elder steps in to train Kenichi personally. This shocks everybody as the Elder has never before trained a disciple, not even the other masters. Niijima plans on recruiting Kisara to Shinpaku Alliance by blackmail. Instead Siegfried bribes her with kittens. She agrees to join Shinpaku Alliance when Niijima reveals the Second Fist Berserker is coming. Kenichi and the Elder go to the Elders secret training area, the Dark Valley, where even the slightest mistake could be fatal. Loki tries to convince Berserker to defeat Odin and take over Ragnarok. The Elder forbids Kenichi from practising martial art. Kenichi is unable to leave due to their distance from civilisation and the wild bears in the forest. Kenichi spends his time fetching water and firewood. An unseen presence repeatedly swipes at Kenichi from behind, which worries him. The Elder proves adept at catching fish with his bare hands, while Kenichi catches nothing and instead scavenges nuts from the forest. The unseen presence continues to harass Kenichi who goes against the Elders orders and secretly trains at night, which leaves him exhausted and starving. He attempts to steal the Elders food but ends up lost in the forest. At Ryozanpaku Dojo they become worried for Kenichi's safety and threaten to serve Akisame nothing but green bell peppers, which he hates, unless he tells them what the Elder is up to. Akisame reveals that if Kenichi succeeds at the Elders training he will be a better martial artist, but if he fails he will no longer be the same Kenichi he once was.
43	"Limiter! Invitation to the World of Bloodshed!" (Japanese: リミッター!修羅道への誘い)	August 12, 2007
Kenichi is found unconscious by Ogata Ishinsai who lives alone in the Dark Valley. Kenichi tells him about his defeat by Odin. Akisame explains to Miu there are two types of martial artists, those who remain calm and rely on training, and those who lose control and fight with pure rage. Due to his loss against Odin, Kenichi is dangerously close to losing control, and the Elder is trying to prevent this happening. Akisame explains Ryozanpaku Dojo had a disciple before Kenichi, Ogata Ishinsai, who did lose control and was expelled after he killed another martial artist. Kenichi is attacked by a bear but is saved by Ogata who brutally slaughters it, horrifying Kenichi. Ogata offers to become Kenichi's master and train him to gain the power to kill his opponents. Kenichi declines the offer as he only fights to protect people he cares about. Plus he already has 6 terrifying masters. Ogata gives him directions back to the Elders camp. The Elder is happy Kenichi has learned to control his anger and teaches Kenichi how to use the Seikuken, allowing him to finally catch a fish. Kenichi also manages to defend himself from the Elder, who was actually the one swiping at the back of his head with his super speed. Kenichi's joy at learning Seikuken soon disappears when the Elder announces his real Dark Valley training can now begin. In the Forest Ogata is upset the Elder had used him to teach Kenichi an important lesson. Deciding to return to the city he dons his fighting outfit, revealing his true identity as the Sage Fist.
44	"Collapse of the Shinpaku Federation! The Crazy Fist Stealthily Approaches!" (Japanese: 新白連合崩壊!忍び寄る狂拳)	August 19, 2007
Kenichi continues with the Elders nightmarish Seikuken training which again, almost kills him numerous times. Niijima arranges a gathering to welcome Kisara and her followers into Shinpaku Alliance. Takeda and Ukita are both attacked by Berserker, while Miu runs into Kisara at a pet shop. Kisara thinks Miu has a crush on Kenichi, though Miu denies it a little too much. They are both attacked by Freya, who fights using a lightning fast Bō staff, and her Valkyries. Miu and Kisara prepare to fight together. Berserker easily takes out Ukita and faces Takeda, who realises Berserker does not use martial arts, he is a street fighter who uses pure natural talent combined with anger to make himself stronger. Takeda only succeeds in grazing Berserker's face before being beaten unconscious. Niijima draws Berserker away from Takeda and Ukita, avoiding his attacks with Personal Niijima-style Escape Art. Miu fights the Valkyrie allowing Kisara to face Freya alone. Niijima tricks berserker into falling into a pit trap.
45	"The Decisive Attack! Kisara Dances!" (Japanese: 決別の一撃!キサラ、舞う!)	August 26, 2007
With Berserker in the pit Niijima tries to trap him there by pouring glue on him. Berserker escapes the pit and is about to kill Niijima but is stopped by Siegfried. Niijima escapes. Freya believes that because women are naturally weaker than men female martial artists should use weapons to overcome the disadvantage. Kisara disagrees as she chooses to use martial arts to become stronger rather than rely on a weapon to gain strength. Miu keeps the Valkyrie from interfering in their fight. Siegfried is unable to keep up with Berserker who breaks several of his ribs. Desperate, Siegfried attempts to drown both himself and Berserker in the river, but Berserker activates his Berserker Mode, becoming much stronger than he was before. He beats Siegfried unconscious underwater and disappears. Siegfried is saved from drowning by the masters who had been passing by. Kisara and Miu continue their respective fights with Freya and the Valkyrie. In Dark Valley Kenichi's training continues to increase in difficulty. Miu defeats all the Valkyrie. Kisara steals one of Miu's moves and succeeds in breaking Freya's staff. Freya concedes defeat as using her staff with sharp broken points would be too dangerous. Tanimoto learns Niijima has planned a large counterattack against Ragnarok. Niijima and his one surviving subordinate Matsui barricade themselves in an abandoned factory. Koga the Kicker, who remains loyal to Ragnarok, attempts to poison Niijima with laxatives, only for Niijima to force him to drink them instead. Koga flees to find a bathroom. Loki and Number 20 arrive with every member of Ragnarok's army and surround the warehouse.
46	"Farewell! A Determined Niijima Joins the Fray!" (Japanese: さらば!!新島、決意の出陣)	September 2, 2007
Kenichi receives an encouraging message from Niijima. Kenichi realises it is Niijima's way of saying goodbye before the battle with Ragnarok. Niijima flees the warehouse when Ragnarok set it on fire. The Elder agrees to end Kenichi's training early but they are still hours away from home. Niijima is torn between wanting to escape and actual concern for Matsui. Thor joins the fight against Ragnarok's army. Tanimoto also joins, determined to fight Loki personally. Kenichi is carried by the Elder running at superhuman speed along the top of electrical wires to get there in time. Odin and Berserker turn up at the battle. Loki declares Odin unfit to lead Ragnarok. At Ryozanpaku Dojo Siegfried is desperate to join the battle, though Akisame and Kensei insist he must stay in bed. Instead Apachai carries Siegfried on his bed and all the masters head out to watch the battle. Loki finally reveals his plan to replace Odin with Berserker and introduces several new fighters as his new Eight Fists. However, Berserker stays loyal to Odin and takes out the new Eight Fists and Loki. Hermit, furious at losing the chance to fight Loki, chooses to fight Berserker. Thor is stopped by Odin who uses an advanced technique to injure his internal organs. Before Thor can be killed the Elder drops Kenichi right in front of Odin.
47	"The Weakness of the Genius! Effort Surpasses Talent!" (Japanese: 天才の弱点!努力は才能を凌駕する!)	September 9, 2007
The masters, Miu and Siegfried and the Elder set up a picnic across the river so they can enjoy watching the battle. Kenichi learns Berserker took out Takeda, Ukita and Siegfried and attacks, revealing to Odin he has learned Seikuken. Tanimoto insists on fighting Berserker so Kenichi can save his strength to fight Odin. However, Odin has no interest in fighting Kenichi a second time and instead has Berserker fight both Kenichi and Tanimoto by himself. Tanimoto manages to hit Berserker, who is happy to finally have a real challenge. At first Tanimoto's training and Berserkers raw talent and strength allow neither to gain the upper hand, until Berserker activates his Berserker Mode once again, fighting on pure instinct and rage. Tanimoto manages to perform a counter, knocking Berserker to the ground. Berserker, fuelled by adrenaline, attacks wildly, allowing Tanimoto to dislocate his elbow before finally defeating him. Kenichi prepares to face Odin.
48	"Showdown between the Leaders! The Man with the Legendary Spear!" (Japanese: 頂上対決!伝説の槍を持つ男)	September 16, 2007
Berserker manages to stand up again but is convinced by Kenichi to give up, recalling his lesson that you learn more from defeat than from victory. Odin suddenly knocks out the weakened Berserker. Kenichi and Odin both activate their Seikuken and exchange a flurry of blows, neither able to overcome the others Seikuken. The masters realise Odin's master must be Sage Fist, and that he is also secretly watching the battle. Siegfried escapes the masters and swims across the river to join the battle. Odin distracts Kenichi by ordering his army to attack Kenichi's friends. With help from the Elder, Siegfried joins the battle just in time to help the weakened Tanimoto. Suddenly, the entire Shinpaku Alliance, led by the recovered Takeda and Ukita, arrive and join the battle on more equal terms with Ragnarok. Kenichi succeeds in throwing Odin using the very first stepping technique he learned from Miu. Odin reveals why he is called Odin. Just as Odin sacrificed an eye to gain the ability to see everything, by taking off his glasses he becomes near-sighted and able to use an incredibly difficult Inner Eye technique allowing him to perfectly predict exactly where Kenichi will strike next. Using this technique allows Odin to improve his Seikuken beyond normal levels and to use an incredibly accurate Gungnir attack that can even penetrate an opponent's Seikuken to land a blow.
49	"The Mightiest Transformation! The Ryōzanpaku Rhythm!" (Japanese: 最強変身!リズム梁山泊!)	September 23, 2007
Kenichi is unable to avoid Odin's Gungnir attack and takes several heavy strikes. Odin recalls how, as a child, he realised Kenichi was not as dedicated to learning martial arts as he was and after Kenichi's betrayal bought himself a Yin-yang badge and trained for 10 years to defeat Kenichi and prove he was weak by swapping his badge for Kenichi's. Eventually he witnessed Sage fist mercilessly kill two assassins and became his disciple to attain power. Kenichi allows himself to be struck several times to get in close and use the powerful punch he used to defeat Siegfried, though Odin still manages to block it. Realising that Odin can predict his every move with his Inner Eye Kenichi instead models his movements after all of his masters, completely changing the rhythm of his movements so that even Odin's Inner Eye cannot predict where he will strike. By copying the movements of Apachai, Sakaki, Kensei, and Shigure Kenichi is able to land multiple powerful strikes on Odin. This greatly entertains the watching masters who are proud their disciple has improved to such a degree as to copy their moves. By finally imitating Akisame Kenichi performs a Judo throw but Odin is accidentally wounded when he lands on broken metal. Odin, furious that Kenichi still does not remember how he betrayed him as a child uses an extremely dangerous technique, by combining both the Dou and Sei energies in his body he becomes monstrously powerful.
50	"The Mightiest Disciple, Kenichi!" (Japanese: 史上最強の弟子ケンイチ!!)	September 29, 2007
Having combined his Dou and Sei energies Odin becomes monstrously powerful for a short time, though the two energies will eventually destroy his body and drive him insane. Kenichi is completely overwhelmed by Odin's power. The masters realise Sage Fist had deliberately used Odin as a test subject to see exactly what happens to a person's body and mind when Dou and Sei are combined. Odin tells Kenichi exactly what happened as children. While young Miu fought Kenichi grabbed a whistle from Odin to warn Miu of a thug approaching her from behind. She defeated the thug but Kenichi was knocked out and Odin took the credit for warning Miu. Feeling guilty Odin fought with Kenichi over the Yin-yang badge, though Kenichi ended up winning he tried to give Odin the badge and said if anyone asked, Odin could claim he won their fight. This drove Odin to train for 10 years, not so he could take the badge, but so he could finally win against Kenichi for real. Sage Fist is about to interrupt but is surrounded by the masters who insist that masters never interfere with battles between disciples. Outraged, Kenichi rises up and fights Odin once more. However, the combined energies begin to damage Odin's body, preventing him from defending himself. Kenichi's final strike knocks him down. The roof they are standing on is now too damaged by the fire to support them and it collapses. Kenichi tries to save Odin, who finally admits Kenichi is the winner and returns Kenichi's badge before falling into the fire. Odin is saved at the last second by Sage Fist, while Kenichi is saved by the Elder. Sage Fist leaves with Odin, promising that soon Ryozanpaku Dojo will no longer be the strongest in the world. Together the masters manage to contain the explosion, saving the people outside. Kenichi is sad he did not manage to become friends with Odin again, but is happy he still has his other friends at Ryozanpaku Dojo and Shinpaku Alliance. He returns with the Elder, having reclaimed his badge and more determined than ever to become the Number One Disciple.

=== Kenichi: The Mightiest Disciple – The Attack of Darkness (2012–14) ===
No.	Title	Original release date
1	"New Assassins!"; Transliteration: "Aratanaru shikaku" (Japanese: 新アサシン!)	March 14, 2012
Kenichi has recovered from his battle against Ragnarok. The masters discuss the emergence of Yami, who have joined forces with Sage Fist to take out Ryozanpaku Dojo. They conclude Yami's first move will be to take out the Ryozanpaku disciple, Kenichi. Kenichi has fallen behind in school. Tanimoto reveals Shinpaku Alliance will be targeted by Yami. Miu tells Kenichi he lacks a warriors heart, a disadvantage against Yami, who fight to kill. Kenichi takes Honoka and Miu shopping. They are attacked by two disciples of Yami sent to kill Kenichi. Kenichi uses his full power when Honoka is hurt. The disciples reveal they were sent to kill Kenichi while dozens of Yami fighters were sent to kill the masters at Ryozanpaku Dojo. The masters easily defeat the Yami fighters. Miu and Kenichi defeat the disciples. Everyone works together to repair the damage done to Ryozanpaku Dojo during the masters fight.
2	"The Girl from China!"; Transliteration: "Chūgoku kara kita shōjo" (Japanese: 中国からの女の子！)	June 18, 2012
Kenichi has planted flowers all over Shinpaku Alliance headquarters. He meets a girl from China named Li Raichi who is lost and shares his love for flowers. Kenichi realises she had been searching for Shinpaku Alliance headquarters. Renka Ma appears at Ryozanpaku Dojo for Kenichi which makes Miu jealous. Shinpaku Alliance is attacked by a Yami disciple called Spark, who uses drunken boxing while wearing armour that produces sparks to blind her opponents. She demands to fight and kill Kenichi. Realising Spark does not know what Kenichi looks like Takeda and Siegfried both claim to be Kenichi, but she knows they are lying and she almost kills Siegfried. Kenichi appears and fights her, but is at a disadvantage as he swore to never hit women. Realising she is the girl he met earlier he pins her several times but releases her before she can break her own bones to escape. She almost chokes Kenichi unconscious but admits defeat as Kenichi knows someone who values flowers as much as she does could not be a true killer. Spark is struck by Li Tenmon, a Yami member and Sparks Master/Father who uses an extremely destructive martial art to almost destroy the building. Kensei appears and defeats Li. Li accuses Kensei of holding back so he would not die. Kensei accuses him of the same thing, otherwise he would have killed everybody but could not as he is a father and could not bring himself to kill someone else's child. Li leaves with his daughter, but wonders if Kenichi is strong enough to keep his title as the Strongest Disciple.
3	"Beautiful Assassin!"; Transliteration: "Uruwashiki ansatsusha" (Japanese: 美しい暗殺者！)	November 16, 2012
Kenichi wants to know how strong he really is. Sakaki accepts a job from the Japanese government. Kenichi goes with him to learn about the real world of martial arts. Christopher Éclair, a Yami assassin, flies to Japan. Sakaki and Kenichi are asked to prevent Christopher assassinating arms dealer Gauche Wynne. Christopher attacks and kidnaps Kenichi, planning to exchange him for Gauche. At an empty hotel Christopher tells Kenichi about his past with Sakaki. Sakaki appears and fights Christopher. Miu fights his knife wielding subordinates. Kenichi avoids being stabbed using Personal Niijima-style Escape Art. Christopher insults Kenichi's worth as a disciple. Gauche appears with a gun, distracting Sakaki who is thrown out a window to fall to his death, devastating Kenichi and Miu. Christopher breaks Gauche's leg. Kenichi lands a surprise punch to Christophers face, who claims he merely forgot to dodge it as Kenichi had no killing intent. He fights both Kenichi and Miu. Gauche offers Kenichi money to protect him, but Miu explains Kenichi fights for his belief in doing what is right, not for money, which surprises Gauche. Sakaki reappears in the middle of the fight and punches Christopher in the face for dropping him out of the window. Then when he sees Christopher had hurt Kenichi and Miu he beats him unconscious with his monstrous power, destroying part of the building. At Ryozanpaku Dojo Kenichi's injuries are treated. The masters consider his returning alive to be a huge success. Miu realizes Kenichi is actually much stronger than she had thought he was. The police tell Sakaki that Christopher escaped, while Gauche, inspired by Kenichi, gave up arms dealing, donated his wealth to charity and disappeared into the mountains to discover what it means to have belief.
4	"Beautiful Wings!"; Transliteration: "Utsukushiki tsubasa" (Japanese: 美しい羽!)	September 16, 2013
Yami member Akira Hongou and his disciple Shō Kanō attend a Yami meeting to decide which of their disciples will kill Kenichi after the defeat of Sage Fist's disciple, Odin. A spy is allowed to escape by Shō after preventing her from stealing data. It is the anniversary of Miu's parents deaths and she invites Kenichi to go with her and the Elder to visit their graves. At the Furinji family shrine Kenichi notices Miu's father's name is missing. Shō watches them secretly. Miu and Kenichi go on a date to a flower garden. They end up separated and Miu meets Shō who immediately falls in love with her graceful martial arts style. He asks her to go with him to join Yami claiming he knew her father, Saiga Furinji. Desperate to learn about her father Miu agrees to go with him. Kenichi spots them leaving on Shō's motorbike and Shō is shocked Kenichi can run fast enough to keep up with them. Kenichi catches and stops the bike and notices that Miu and Shō martial arts are very similar. Before they can fight Tanimoto appears and saves Kenichi from a lethal strike, revealing Shō is the leader of Yomi, the disciples of the Yami masters. Shō attempts to flee with Miu, though Miu is convinced to stay by Kenichi who swears to keep training to protect her. Shō leaves, confident Miu will soon realise she belongs with Yami, and having stolen one of her hairclips and replaced it with his earring. Kenichi is devastated that Shō kissed Miu on the cheek. It is revealed Tanimoto was only at the flower garden because Honoka beat him at Othello so he would take her on a picnic.
5	"God of Death vs The Demon!"; Transliteration: "shinigami vs. akuma" (Japanese: 悪魔対死の神！)	September 16, 2013
The Elder has been secretly buying expensive scrolls and hiding the cost from Miu. He is caught by Kenichi. The Elder insists the scroll is related to how Apachai came to be at Ryozanpaku Dojo and will tell Kenichi the story if he keeps the scroll a secret. In flashback the Elder and young Miu travel to a poor village. The villagers offer the Elder money to kill a pirate who has kidnapped their children as slaves and has a bodyguard, a deadly Muay Thai fighter named Apachai Hopachai. Miu meets a strange man, revealed to be Apachai, and shares her food with him. The Elder fights the pirates until he encounters Apachai and their fight damages the ship. Miu follows secretly but is captured when the pirates threaten the other children. The captain shoots at both the Elder and Apachai to prevent further damage to the ship. When he then threatens to shoot Miu Apachai realises the captain is evil and works with the Elder to save the children. The Elder performs a strange technique on the captain but leaves him alive. The next day the captain wakes up with total amnesia from the Elders technique, to make him a better man by erasing his evil memories. Kenichi doubts such a memory erasing technique exists. The Elder and Miu returned the children and gave them the captains treasure, refusing to take any himself, instead taking only the money he had agreed to be paid as it contained the villagers gratitude and was therefore much more valuable. Apachai followed them back to Ryozanpaku Dojo. Kenichi realises the story has nothing to do with the scroll and threatens to tell Miu. Instead the Elder uses his memory erasing technique on Kenichi who forgets the scroll ever existed.
6	"The Soldier from Russia!"; Transliteration: "Roshia kara kita senshi" (Japanese: ロシア兵士！)	November 18, 2013
Several Yomi members, including Boris Ivanov, disciple of Yami master Alexander Gaidar, are put under the leadership of Shō and ordered to eliminate as many dojo's in Japan as possible as a declaration of war against Ryozanpaku. Kenichi once again attempts to escape Ryozanpaku to get a break from constantly training and finally succeeds with help from Tochumaru. He ends up hiding at Tanimoto's home, who is still searching for his old master, Sougetsu Ma. Boris learns that only one Dojo is left standing and orders his team to attack at once. Apachai discovers Kenichi hiding at Tanimoto's home but is bribed with food to keep it a secret. At school Kenichi tries to avoid Miu until he learns she is not upset at him for escaping, though he becomes upset at her as she has kept Shō's earring in case she has a chance to exchange it for her stolen hairclip. Tanimoto forces Kenichi to attend a Shinpaku meeting where Niijima is planning to take out Yomi to establish Shinpaku as a respected organisation. Boris and his team approach Ryozanpaku, though Boris, who struggles to read Japanese, does not realize it is Ryozanpaku Dojo. At Tanimoto's house Tanimoto and Honoka continue their Othello feud. Tanimoto scolds Kenichi for avoiding his training, even though he had promised to become strong enough to protect Miu. At Ryozanpaku most of Boris' team are effortlessly incapacitated by the Masters. Boris, hoping for a decent fight, issues a formal duel challenge just as Kenichi returns.
7	"Conviction Concentrated in One's Fist!"; Transliteration: "Kobushi ni kometa shinnen" (Japanese: 信念は一つの拳に集中します！)	November 18, 2013
Boris realises he is at Ryozanpaku but insists on fighting the Masters. The Masters refuse to fight a disciple, but worry about Kenichi as Boris is obviously more skilled. Kenichi appears and is attacked by Boris who injures Miu. Kenichi duels with Boris who fights using a Russian martial art Command Sambo, and immediately strangles Kenichi, but Kenichi uses a karate organ manipulation technique to keep breathing and escapes being pinned. Boris struggles to remain calm as Kenichi appears weak and should already be dead but keeps on fighting. Boris' every move is countered by Kenichi using Seikuken and other techniques. The Masters are impressed at the training Boris must have gone through. Boris, who was trained to kill, cannot understand Kenichi's martial art and they fight evenly matched. Apachai, having stolen Boris' radio, is contacted by Boris' leader, Sho, and an embarrassed Boris is forced to take the call in the middle of the fight. Sho orders Boris to retreat so Boris gives Kenichi an official Yomi duel emblem, swearing to one day kill Kenichi and retrieve the emblem. Boris retreats with his team while the Masters prepare for war with Yami. At sea a submarine surfaces next to the Yami ship, carrying Boris' master, Alexander Gaidar. He argues with Sage Fist, upset he and Sho manipulated Boris into unknowingly attacking Ryozanpaku, starting the war ahead of schedule. The Masters expel Kenichi from Ryozanpaku to keep him safe. Kenichi easily sees through their poor acting and refuses to be expelled, determined to fight Yami. The Masters are proud Kenichi is willing to fight Yami, despite the high risk of death, which, according to Akisame's calculation, will be in 3 months unless Kenichi is put through 3 times his current amount of training. Kenichi attempts to escape again but is tied up by Shigure and dragged back to Ryozanpaku.
8	"The God of Destruction Under the Tracks"; Transliteration: "Gādo-shita no hakaijin" (Japanese: ガード下の破壊神)	February 14, 2014
Ikki Takeda searches for a master to teach him boxing and runs into James Shiba who he starts pursuing and pressuring into becoming his master after accomplishing two unaccomplishable tasks for him, he relents and lets him become his disciple and starts training him. Kenichi gets a new uniform from his masters with pieces from each fighting style.
9	"Anonymous (18 years) ♡"; Transliteration: "Tokumeikibō jūhassai ♡" (Japanese: 匿名希望18歳♡)	February 14, 2014
Akisame Kōetsuji and James Shiba are competing through their disciples and Kenichi learns about the secret underground and asks Shio to take him there which he does together with Apachai Hopachai, where he forces him to fight several opponents before hauling him away as Rachel Stanley challenges him.
10	"The King of Tidat (1)"; Transliteration: "Tidādo no Ō (zenpen)" (Japanese: ティダードの王（前編）)	May 16, 2014
Kenichi and Miu are on a field trip in the mountains with their school, they encounter a little girl who leads them into a trap by Radin Tidat Jihan one of the disciples of Yomi. Meanwhile Miu gets sick because of suppressed memories leaving Kenichi to face Radin Tadit Jihan on his own while trying to protect her. Kenichi manages to hide Miu inside a ski lift and faces off with Radin Tidat Jihan.
11	"The King of Tidat (2)"; Transliteration: "Tidādo no Ō (kōhen)" (Japanese: ティダードの王（後編）)	May 16, 2014
Kenichi's fight with Radin Tidat Jihan continues who fights dirty and aims to kill and lets his subordinates step in every time he is at a disadvantage, luckily Natsu Tanimoto and Haruo Niijima show up the moment Miu is discovered and Kenichi is to die. Natsu makes short work of his henchmen while Kenichi and Radin fall off a cliff. Then Silcardo Jenazad shows up saying Radin is a disgrace and he tries to bury them with an avalanche which Kenichi escapes but kills Radin Tidat Jihan. Back home Kenichi and Ryōzanpaku receive an invitation for the Desperate Fight of Disciples which they accept, as they try to leave the Shinpaku Alliance shows up wanting to come with them.

== Home media ==
Funimation Entertainment (Region 1)
Volume		Episodes	Release date	Ref.
Season One	Part 1	1–13	March 10, 2009	
Season One	Part 2	14–26	June 16, 2009	
Season Two	Part 1	27–38	March 9, 2010	
Season Two	Part 2	39–50	May 25, 2010	

Anime Classics
Volume	Release date	Discs	Episodes	Ref.
Complete Season 1	September 27, 2011	4	1–26	
Complete Season 2	May 29, 2012	4	27–50	
