= Anime Sound Production =

Anime Sound Production (株式会社アニメ・サウンド・プロダクション, Kabushiki gaisha Anime Saundo Purodakushon) is a sound effects company working in the television, movie, radio, video, CD, cassette and video game animation industry in Japan.

== Company history ==
The company was founded on January 1, 1977, by Shoji Kato (加藤 昭二, Katō Shōji), a former sound effects artist from Fizz Sound Creation (formerly Ishida Sound Productions, Inc.).

=== Employees ===
==== Executive ====
Representative Director: Toru Noguchi (野口 透)

==== Staff ====
- Toru Noguchi (野口 透)
- Tsutomu Sukigara (鋤柄 務)

==== Former staff ====
- Shoji Kato (加藤昭二)
- Hiroshi Inoue (井上 裕)
- Masato Kai (甲斐 雅人)
- Rie Komiya (古宮 理恵) (freelance)
- Kiyoshi Matsuda (松田 清)
- Shinji Kazama (風間 慎二)
- Kenichi Mori (森 賢一) (formerly of Fizz Sound Creation)
- Junichi Sasaki (佐々木 純一) (freelance)

== Works ==
(Listed in alphabetic order)

=== Principal productions ===
- B-Daman series
- El Hazard series
- Eyeshield 21
- Fushigi Yuugi series
- Irresponsible Captain Tylor series
- Tomato-Man and the Knights of the Salad Table
- Kare Kano
- Neon Genesis Evangelion series
- Ninku
- Oh My Goddess! (OVA)
- Tenchi Muyo! series
- Trouble Chocolate
- Vampire Princess Miyu series
- Yu-Gi-Oh! Duel Monsters
- Yu-Gi-Oh! Duel Monsters GX
- Yu Yu Hakusho series
- Full Moon o Sagashite
- Magical Princess Minky Momo series
- Mermaid Melody Pichi Pichi Pitch series
- Onegai My Melody series
- Hamtaro series
- Ultra Maniac
- Mirmo!
- Akubi-chan series

=== Freelance productions ===
This list contains some of the productions in which individual employees of Anime Sound took part, but for which the company itself was not hired. Any productions which are listed in the Principal production list are not repeated here.

==== Shoji Kato ====
- Moonlight Mask
- Gatchaman II
- Gatchaman F
- Ikki Tousen
- Dirty Pair
- Full Moon o Sagashite
- AIKa R-16: Virgin Mission
- Animal Yokochō
- Twin Spica
- Ninku
- Chi's Sweet Home
- Gon, the Little Fox
- Like the Clouds, Like the Wind
- The Story of Saiunkoku
- Kaitei Daisensou: Ai no 20.000 Miles
- Eyeshield 21 series
- Scan2Go
- House of Five Leaves
- Tokimeki Tonight
- Kobo-chan
- Junk Boy
- Iga no Kabamaru
- Lament of the Lamb
- Tensai Bakabon
- The Place Promised in Our Early Days
- Yu Yu Hakusho series
- Fushigi Yuugi (OVA 3)
- Kobo, the Li'l Rascal
- Mojacko
- My Big Big Friend
- In This Corner of the World
- Time Patrol Bon
- Mad Bull 34
- Harlock Saga
- I Shall Never Return
- Touch
- 5 Centimeters Per Second
- Osomatsu-kun
- Yoroshiku Mechadock
- Okawari-Boy Starzan S
- Anime Ganbare Goemon
- Super Doll Licca-chan
- Princess Comet
- Magical Princess Minky Momo series

==== Junichi Sasaki ====
- Creamy Mami, the Magic Angel
- Persia, the Magic Fairy
- Magical Emi, the Magic Star
- Pastel Yumi, the Magic Idol
- Magical Angel Sweet Mint
- Anmitsu Hime
- Idol Angel Yokoso Yoko
- Idol Fighter Su-Chi-Pai
- Jankenman
- Floral Magician Mary Bell
- Tomato-Man and the Knights of the Salad Table
- Tenchi Muyo! series
- Oh My Goddess! (OVA)
- Moldiver
- Gokudo
- Trouble Chocolate
- Angel Heart
- Vampire Princess Miyu series
- Violence Jack
- Baketsu de Gohan
- Princess Minerva
- Hikari no Densetsu
- Comic Party
- Can Can Bunny Extra
- Chimera - Angel of Death
- Countdown: Akira
- D4 Princess
- Mermaid Melody Pichi Pichi Pitch series
- Dirty Pair OVA series
- Dirty Pair Flash
- Magic Knight Rayearth series
- Steel Angel Kurumi series
- Zettai Shōnen
- AD Police
- Alice SOS
- Agent Aika
- Burn Up!
- New Angel
- Kodocha (OVA)
- Nontan
- Mob Psycho 100
- Parade Parade
- Plastic Little
- Perverted Thomas
- Ronin Warriors
- Platinumhuen Ordian
- The Rapeman
- Darling
- Otaku no Video
- Silent Möbius
- Show Ahozoshi Akanuke Ichiban!
- Scramble Wars
- Steins;Gate
- Dual Parallel Trouble Adventure
- Edokko Boy: Gatten Taro
- Exper Zenon
- FAKE
- Hanaukyo Maid-tai
- Kekko Kamen
- Level-C
- G-On Riders
- Oshare Majo: Love and Berry
- Masquerade (OVA)
- Ballad of a Shinigami
- Yu-Gi-Oh! 5D's
- Yu-Gi-Oh! Arc-V
- Norakuro-kun
- 801 T.T.S. Airbats
- Key the Metal Idol
- Master of Martial Hearts
- Welcome to Lodoss Island!
- Kowarekake no Orgel
- Robot Carnival
- Kizuna: Bonds of Love
- Ronin Warriors
- Moeyo Ken
- Usagi-chan de Cue!!
- Bubblegum Crash
- 801 T.T.S. Airbats
- Anoko ni 1000%
- Demon Hunter Makaryuudo
- X-Men

==== Toru Noguchi ====
- Idol Angel Yokoso Yoko
- Jankenman
- Floral Magician Mary Bell
- Tomato-Man and the Knights of the Salad Table
- Final Fantasy: Unlimited
- The Family's Defensive Alliance
- Fancy Lala
- Fushigi Yuugi series
- Neon Genesis Evangelion series
- Mermaid Melody Pichi Pichi Pitch series
- Jin-Roh
- Ask Dr. Rin!
- Ashita e Free Kick
- Akachan to Boku
- Android Kikaider
- A Letter to Momo
- The Big O
- The Big O (first season)
- The Cat Returns
- Hikari no Densetsu
- Yu-Gi-Oh! Duel Monsters
- Yu-Gi-Oh! Duel Monsters GX
- Magical Hat
- Magic Knight Rayearth series
- Mega Man: Upon a Star
- Nadia: The Secret of Blue Water
- Casshern Sins
- Code:Breaker
- The Legend of Zorro
- Irresponsible Captain Tylor
- Kare Kano
- Neon Genesis Evangelion
- Black Bullet
- Zillion
- Japan Animator Expo
- Casshern Sins
- Hyouge Mono
- Hyper Police
- Sonic Soldier Borgman
- Tailenders
- Shin Godzilla
- Sugar Sugar Rune (Reboot/Remake anime)
- Yoroshiku Mechadock
- Time Bokan: Royal Revival
- Aoi Kioku - Manmou Kaitaku to Shounen-tachi
- Antique Heart
- Kūsō no Sora Tobu Kikaitachi
- Spirited Away (w/Michihiro Ito)
- Howl's Moving Castle
- Kusoh no Kikai-tachi no Naka no Hakai no Hatsumei

==== Rie Komiya ====
- Death Note (anime version)
- House of Five Leaves
- Yu Yu Hakusho series
- Chiisana Kyōjin Microman: Daigekisen! Microman VS Saikyō Senshi Gorgon
- YAT Anshin! Uchū Ryokō
- Kiba
- Ronin Warriors
- Fushigi Yuugi (OVA 3)
- Mermaid Melody Pichi Pichi Pitch series
- Nagasarete Airantou
- Onegai My Melody series
- Hamtaro series
- Ultra Maniac
- Mirmo!
- Jewelpet
- Dotto! Koni-chan
- Shizuku-chan
- The Place Promised in Our Early Days
- Akubi-chan series
- In This Corner of the World
- Cinderella
