= Mama Loves the Poyopoyo-Saurus =

Japanese manga series

- Cover of second release volume 1 of Mama Poyo.

ママはぽよぽよザウルスがお好き (Mama wa Poyopoyo-Zaurusu ga Osuki)
- Genre: Comedy, Parenting, School
- Manga
- Written by: Takako Aonuma
- Published by: Fujinseikatsusha
- Magazine: Petit Enfant
- Original run: August 1993 – May 1998
- Volumes: 4
- Anime television series
- Directed by: Takayoshi Suzuki
- Music by: Kazunori Maruyama
- Studio: Nippon Animation
- Original network: JNN (MBS, TBS)
- Original run: 2 September 1995 – 31 August 1996
- Episodes: 52

Mama Loves the Poyopoyo-Saurus (Japanese: ママはぽよぽよザウルスがお好き, Hepburn: Mama wa Poyopoyo-Zaurusu ga Osuki) is a yonkoma manga series by Takako Aonuma which ran in the Fujinseikatsusha child-raising magazine Petit Enfant. The manga was adapted to a 52-episode anime television series which ran on the MBS and TBS networks (except for TV Yamaguchi) from September 2, 1995, through August 31, 1996. The series is sometimes called Mama Poyo.

The series follows the "adventures" of a young mother and father as they deal with the joys and challenges of raising small children. The "poyopoyo" in the title is an onomatopoeia for the young children "toddling" around (or walking unsteadily).

== Books ==
=== Manga, first release ===
- Volume 1: ISBN 4-574-00058-9
- Volume 2: ISBN 4-574-00063-5
- Volume 3: ISBN 4-574-00072-4
- Volume 4: ISBN 4-574-00082-1

=== Manga, second release ===
- Volume 1: ISBN 4-344-00422-1
- Volume 2: ISBN 4-344-00443-4
- Volume 3: ISBN 4-344-00461-2

=== Toilet training book ===
Mama Poyo toilet training book.

This book was written by Eiichi Hoashi, a well-known child psychologist in Japan. Aonuma wrote the accompanying manga used to illustrate the various ideas and techniques presented in the book.

- The Battle to Get Two-year-old Ann Out of Diapers: Mama Poyo Special: Going to Undies in Four Steps, ISBN 4-574-00078-3

=== Anime picture books ===
- Volume 1: ISBN 4-574-80037-2
- Volume 2: ISBN 4-574-80038-0
- Volume 3: ISBN 4-574-80039-9
- Volume 4: ISBN 4-574-80040-2
- Volume 5: ISBN
- Volume 6: ISBN
- Volume 7: ISBN
- Volume 8: ISBN
- Volume 9: ISBN 4-574-80045-3
- Volume 10: ISBN 4-574-80046-1
- Volume 11: ISBN 4-574-80078-X
- Volume 12: ISBN 4-574-80079-8

== Anime ==
=== Cast ===
In the manga, the names of the characters are the real names of the Aonuma family, but in the anime, they are given new names. The following are names used in the anime:

- Hyōga Poyota: Yuri Shiratori (5 years old, boy, in oldest class in pre-school)
- Jura Poyota: Satomi Kōrogi (3 years old, girl, in youngest class in pre-school)
- Miki Poyota: Rica Matsumoto (Mom, housewife and picture book author)
- Gendai Poyota: Yūichi Nagashima (Dad, salaryman, called "Darling" by Miki)

Other characters:

- Emi Kunitachi: Kumiko Nishihara
- Reira Kunitachi: Hinako Kanamaru
- Yū Kunitachi: Fujiko Takimoto
- Employee B: Wakana Yamazaki

=== Staff ===
- Original creator: Takako Aonuma
- Director: Takayoshi Suzuki
- Script: Mamiko Ikeda, Minori Ikeno, Tomoko Ishizuka
- Producers: Hiroshi Nishikiori, Fūta Morita, Jōhei Matsuura, Shinya Hanai, Masahiro Hosoda, others
- Character designs: Tatsuo Miura
- Animation director: Tatsuo Miura, Hiroshi Oikawa, Shinichirō Kajiura, Hirokazu Ishino, others
- Background artist: Gōichi Kudō
- Art director: Satoshi Suzuki
- Music: Kazunori Maruyama
- Sound effects: Mitsuru Kageyama (Fizz Sound Creation)
- Audio production: San'onkyō
- Production: MBS, Nippon Animation
- Writing: Takako Aonuma, MBS, Nippon Animation

=== Theme songs ===
==== Opening ====
Beeper Love
Vocals: Now
Lyrics: Umedy
Composer: Cake-K
Arrangement: Shige

==== Ending ====
Itsu no Ma ni ka Kimi o (いつのまにか君を) (acoustic version)
Vocals: Masatoshi Ono
Lyrics: Masatoshi Ono
Composer: Tsukasa
Arrangement: Yoshio Tsuru
Spicy Life (スパイシー・ライフ)
Vocals: Rica Matsumoto
Lyrics: Rui Serizawa
Composer: Kazuyoshi Shina
Arrangement: Tatsuya Nishiwaki
