= Kimi wa 008 =

Japanese manga series

- First tankōbon volume cover

君は008
- Genre: Action, spy
- Manga
- Written by: Syun Matsuena
- Published by: Shogakukan
- Imprint: Shōnen Sunday Comics
- Magazine: Weekly Shōnen Sunday
- Original run: February 21, 2018 – April 24, 2024
- Volumes: 33
- icon

Kimi wa 008 (君は008; lit. 'You Are 008') is a Japanese manga series written and illustrated by Syun Matsuena. It was serialized in Shogakukan's shōnen manga magazine Weekly Shōnen Sunday from February 2018 to April 2024, with its chapters collected in 33 tankōbon volumes.

== Plot ==
Eito Akashi has somehow failed every high school entrance exam. That is because an agency has kept him from doing so, so he can enter their school for training agents. Uninterested at first, he discovers his father was an agent. Wanting to find the cause of his father's death, he enters the school, armed only with his determination.

== Characters ==
Eito Akashi (明石 エイト, Akashi Eito)
Eito is a normal person but is very determined and hard working. He is very selfless and will risk his life to save others. Eito joins the academy to find out more about his father, who was an agent, and to find the cause of his death. While not gifted like other students, he is very observant and quick to improvise.
Ayame Kido (城戸 あやめ, Kido Ayame)
Ayame is a prodigy, often followed by her pet owl Koton. She shows little emotion and is socially awkward, but becomes cold when on missions. It is later revealed she comes from a long-line of assassins, but she was rescued by Eito's father.

== Publication ==
Written and illustrated by Syun Matsuena, Kimi wa 008 was serialized in Shogakukan's shōnen manga magazine Weekly Shōnen Sunday from February 21, 2018, to April 24, 2024. Shogakukan collected its chapters in 33 tankōbon volumes, released from May 18, 2018, to July 18, 2024.

=== Volumes ===
No.	Japanese release date	Japanese ISBN
1	May 18, 2018	978-4-09-128290-3
2	August 17, 2018	978-4-09-128387-0
3	November 16, 2018	978-4-09-128580-5
4	February 18, 2019	978-4-09-128789-2
5	May 17, 2019	978-4-09-129149-3
6	August 16, 2019	978-4-09-129316-9
7	November 18, 2019	978-4-09-129437-1
8	February 18, 2020	978-4-09-129551-4
9	May 18, 2020	978-4-09-850069-7
10	August 18, 2020	978-4-09-850170-0
11	November 18, 2020	978-4-09-850278-3
12	February 18, 2021	978-4-09-850390-2
13	May 18, 2021	978-4-09-850523-4
14	June 17, 2021	978-4-09-850607-1
15	September 17, 2021	978-4-09-850650-7
16	October 18, 2021	978-4-09-850736-8
17	January 18, 2022	978-4-09-850865-5
18	February 18, 2022	978-4-09-851040-5
19	May 18, 2022	978-4-09-851128-0
20	June 17, 2022	978-4-09-851145-7
21	September 15, 2022	978-4-09-851258-4
22	October 18, 2022	978-4-09-851386-4
23	January 18, 2023	978-4-09-851386-4
24	February 16, 2023	978-4-09-851386-4
25	May 18, 2023	978-4-09-852055-8
26	June 16, 2023	978-4-09-852121-0
27	September 15, 2023	978-4-09-852782-3
28	October 18, 2023	978-4-09-852852-3
29	January 18, 2024	978-4-09-853075-5
30	March 18, 2024	978-4-09-853175-2
31	May 17, 2024	978-4-09-853292-6
32	June 18, 2024	978-4-09-853375-6
33	July 18, 2024	978-4-09-853433-3

== Reception ==
By November 2018, the manga had 170,000 copies in circulation. By March 2019, the manga had 220,000 copies in circulation.

== See also ==
- Kenichi: The Mightiest Disciple, another manga series by the same author
- Waza no Tabibito, another manga by the same author
- Tokiwa Kitareri!!, another manga series by the same author
