= Waza no Tabibito =

Japanese manga and anime film

- Cover of the tankōbon volume

技の旅人
- Genre: Action, high fantasy
- Anime film
- Directed by: Syun Matsuena
- Written by: Syun Matsuena
- Music by: Tenmon
- Released: July 2, 2011
- Runtime: 31 minutes
- Manga
- Written by: Syun Matsuena
- Published by: Shogakukan
- Imprint: Shōnen Sunday Comics
- Magazine: Weekly Shōnen Sunday
- Original run: September 21, 2011 – September 28, 2011
- Volumes: 1
- icon

Waza no Tabibito (技の旅人; 'Wanderer of Skill') is a Japanese anime film and two-chapter manga created by Syun Matsuena. The CGI film was screened at the Shogakukan's Jisedai World Hobby Fair '11 Summer in July 2011, while the manga was published in Shogakukan's shōnen manga magazine Weekly Shōnen Sunday in September 2011.

== Characters ==
Tekuni Depagā (てくに でぱがー)
Voiced by: Rie Kugimiya
Fukku Rō (フック ロウ)
Voiced by: Takashi Mochizuki
Ruri (ルリ)
Voiced by: Arise Sato
Shiento (シエント)
Voiced by: Tomokazu Seki
Caroto (キャロト)
Voiced by: Tomoko Kawakami
Asami (アサミ)
Voiced by: Asami Kikuchi
Hyūga DD (ヒュウガDD)
Voiced by: Hironori Kondō
Robot (ロボ, Robo)
Voiced by: Syun Matsuena

== Media ==
=== Film ===
Created, designed, written and produced by Syun Matsuena, with music composed by Tenmon, the Waza no Tabibito CGI film was screened at the Shogakukan's Jisedai World Hobby Fair '11 Summer on July 2, 2011. The film was released on DVD, along with the collected tankōbon volume of the manga and a soundtrack CD, on November 18, 2011.

=== Manga ===
Written and illustrated by Syun Matsuena, the two chapters of Waza no Tabibito were published in Shogakukan's shōnen manga magazine Weekly Shōnen Sunday from September 21–28, 2011. Shogakukan collected these chapters in a single tankōbon volume, released on November 18, 2011.

== See also ==
- Kenichi: The Mightiest Disciple, another manga series by the same author
- Kimi wa 008, another manga series by the same author
- Tokiwa Kitareri!!, another manga series by the same author
