= Tokiwa Kitareri!! =

Japanese manga series by Syun Matsuena

- First tankōbon volume cover

トキワ来たれり！！
- Genre: Action
- Manga
- Written by: Syun Matsuena
- Published by: Shogakukan
- Imprint: Shōnen Sunday Comics
- Magazine: Weekly Shōnen Sunday
- Original run: December 3, 2014 – June 7, 2017
- Volumes: 13
- icon

Tokiwa Kitareri!! (トキワ来たれり！！) is a Japanese manga series written and illustrated by Syun Matsuena. It was serialized in Shogakukan's Weekly Shōnen Sunday from December 2014 to June 2017, with its chapters collected in 13 tankōbon volumes.

== Publication ==
Written and illustrated by Syun Matsuena, Tokiwa Kitareri!! was serialized in Shogakukan's Weekly Shōnen Sunday from December 3, 2014, to June 7, 2017. Shogakukan collected its chapters into individual tankōbon volumes. The first volume was released on February 18, 2015. An animated promotional video for the fifth volume release, produced by J.C.Staff and directed by Kiyotaka Ohata, was released on January 16, 2018; it features Kensho Ono as Tokiwa Yasaka, Takahiro Sakurai as Kanata Kusanagi, Eri Kitamura as Rein, Yasuaki Takumi as Deusu Makina, Daiki Yamashita as Haruka Yata, and Yuna Yoshino as Aria. The 13th and final volume was released on July 18, 2017.

=== Volumes ===
No.	Japanese release date	Japanese ISBN
1	February 18, 2015	978-4-09-125596-9
2	April 17, 2015	978-4-09-125800-7
3	July 17, 2015	978-4-09-126187-8
4	September 18, 2015	978-4-09-126247-9
5	January 18, 2016	978-4-09-126499-2
6	April 18, 2016	978-4-09-127094-8
7	June 17, 2016	978-4-09-127230-0
8	September 16, 2016	978-4-09-127334-5
9	December 16, 2016	978-4-09-127422-9
10	March 17, 2017	978-4-09-127505-9
11	June 16, 2017	978-4-09-127573-8
12	July 18, 2017	978-4-09-127654-4
13	July 18, 2017	978-4-09-127674-2

== See also ==
- Kenichi: The Mightiest Disciple, another manga series by the same author
- Waza no Tabibito, another manga by the same author
- Kimi wa 008, another manga series by the same author
