= Takako Aonuma =

Japanese manga artist

- Born: January 1, 1960 (age 66); Hakodate, Hokkaidō, Japan
- Occupation: Manga artist

Takako Aonuma (青沼貴子, Aonuma Takako; January 1, 1960) is a Japanese manga artist who writes primarily yonkoma manga.

== Works ==
- Ann 2-sai, Omutsu ha Zushi Taisakisen
- Persia ga Suki!
- Mama Loves the Poyopoyo-Saurus
- Odoron Angel
- Takako Aonuma no Madame Hanako
- Tanpopo-chan
- It Buries and Is the Fruit
