= Fizz Sound Creation =

Japanese sound effects company

Fizz Sound Creation Co., Ltd. (株式会社フィズサウンドクリエイション, Kabushiki Kaisha Fizu Saundo Kurieishon) is a sound effects company working in the television, movie, radio, video, CD, cassette and game animation industry in Japan.

== Company history ==
The company was founded in 1971 by Hidenori Ishida (石田 秀憲, Ishida Hidenori) as Ishida Sound Production, Inc. (石田サウンドプロダクション, Ishida Saundo Purodakushon). In 1980, the company name was changed to Fizz Sound Creation.

=== Employees ===
==== Executives ====
- Representative Director: Masahiro Shōji (庄司 雅弘)
- Director: Akihiko Matsuda (松田 昭彦) (retired in dec. 2015)
- Director: Hidenori Arai (新井 秀徳) (retired in dec. 2015)
- Auditor: Hiroko Harada (原田 浩子)

==== Staff ====
- Masahiro Shōji (庄司 雅弘)
- Masami Kitakata (北方 将実)
- Yuka Kazama (風間 結花)

==== Former staff ====
- Atsushi Harada (原田 敦)
- Hidenori Ishida (石田 秀憲)
- Osamu Itō (伊藤 修)
- Kenichi Mori (森 賢一) (transferred to Harada Sound. then went over to Anime Sound Production and later left)
- Keisuke Ishida (石田 圭介)
- Shinji Kobayashi (小林 真二)
- Katsumi Itō (伊藤 克己) (left and founded Swara Productions)
- Shōji Katō (加藤 昭二) (left and founded Anime Sound Production, retired)
- Yasufumi Yoda (依田 安文) (later part of Wai Wai Sound, died in 2008)
- Akihiko Matsuda (松田 昭彦) (now part of JetSoundEngine)
- Hidenori Arai (新井 秀徳) (now part of JetSoundEngine)
- Mutsuhiro Nishimura (西村 睦弘) (now part of JetSoundEngine)
- Mitsuru Kageyama (蔭山 満)
- Kentarō Washio (鷲尾 健太郎)

== Works ==
Listed in alphabetic order.

=== Principal production ===
- 3000 Leagues in Search of Mother (World Masterpiece Theater)
- The Adventures of Tom Sawyer (World Masterpiece Theater)
- After War Gundam X
- Ai no Wakakusa Monogatari (World Masterpiece Theater)
  - Wakakusa Monogatari Nan to Jo-sensei (World Masterpiece Theater)
- Anne of Green Gables (World Masterpiece Theater)
- Amada Anime Series: Super Mario Bros. (OVA)
- ATASHIn'CHI
- Beet the Vandel Buster
- Black Jack
- The Bush Baby (World Masterpiece Theater)
- The Care Bears (DiC Series)
- Chibi Maruko-chan
- City Hunter series
- Crayon Shin-chan
- Corrector Yui
- Cutie Honey
- D.C.: Da Capo
- Daddy Long-Legs (World Masterpiece Theater)
- A Dog of Flanders (World Masterpiece Theater)
- Dragon Ball
- Dragon Ball GT
- Dragon Ball Z
- Dr. Slump
- Doraemon series
- Erudoran series
- Grimm's Fairy Tale Classics (World Masterpiece Theater)
- Jikū Senshi Spielban
- Katri the Milkmaid (World Masterpiece Theater)
- The Swiss Family Robinson: Flone of the Mysterious Island (World Masterpiece Theater)
- Kochira Katsushika-ku Kameari Kōen-mae Hashutsujo
- Lassie (World Masterpiece Theater)
- Little Lord Fauntleroy (World Masterpiece Theater)
- A Little Princess (World Masterpiece Theater)
- Lucy of the Southern Rainbow (World Masterpiece Theater)
- Macross 7
- Macross Dynamite 7
- Mobile Fighter G Gundam
- Mobile Suit Gundam (credited as "Ishida Sound")
- Mobile Suit Gundam: The 08th MS Team
- Mobile Suit Gundam 0083: Stardust Memory
- Mobile Suit Gundam F91
- Mobile Suit Gundam SEED
- Mobile Suit Gundam SEED Destiny
- Mobile Suit Gundam Wing
- Mobile Suit Victory Gundam
- Zeta Gundam A New Translation: Heirs to the Stars
- Zeta Gundam A New Translation II: Lovers
- Zeta Gundam A New Translation III: Love is the Pulse of the Stars
- Monster Rancher
- Nintama Rantarō
- Oishinbo
- One Piece
- Peter Pan (World Masterpiece Theater)
- Planetes
- Pollyanna (World Masterpiece Theater)
- Rascal the Raccoon (World Masterpiece Theater)
- Remi, Nobody's Girl (World Masterpiece Theater)
- Rockman EXE series
- Romeo and the Black Brothers (World Masterpiece Theater)
- Sans Famille (World Masterpiece Theater)
- Sgt. Frog
- The Story of Perrine (World Masterpiece Theater)
- Story of the Alps: My Annette (World Masterpiece Theater)
- Stitch!
- Super Gals!
- The Super Dimension Fortress Macross
- The Super Dimension Fortress Macross: Do You Remember Love?
- The Snow Queen
- Tico of the Seven Seas (World Masterpiece Theater)
- Tonde Burin
- UFO Ultramaiden Valkyrie
- Urusei Yatsura
- Yawara! A Fashionable Judo Girl
- Yūsha series
- Zoids series

=== Freelance production ===
This list contains some of the productions in which individual employees of FIZZ took part, but for which the company itself was not hired. Any productions which are listed in the Principal production list are not repeated here.

==== Akihiko Matsuda ====
- 21-emon
- Armor Hunter Mellowlink
- Armored Trooper Votoms
- B·B
- Batsu & Terī
- Biriken nan demo Shōkai
- Blue Comet SPT Layzner
- Chinpui
- chibi maruko chan
- Chuka Ichiban
- Coji-Coji
- Cyborg 009 The Movie: Legend of the Super Galaxy
- Dirty Pair: Affair of Nolandia
- Esper Mami
- Fang of the Sun Dougram
- Five Star Stories
- Fuku-chan
- Game Center Arashi
- Hēi! Bunbū
- Hunter × Hunter
- Kaibutsu-kun (1980 version, this was the first credit under the "Fizz Sound Creation" name)
- Kerokero Chaimu
- Kikōkai Galient
- Locke the Superman
- Makiba no Shōjo Katori (from episode 2)
- Meiken Jolie
- Mikan Enikki
- Mini-Dora SOS (Doraemon movie)
- Ninja Senshi Tobikage
- Patalliro!
- Pro Golfer Saru
- Queen Millennia
- Seijūshi Bismarck
- Shin Pro Golfer Saru
- Shizukanaru Don – Yakuza Side Story
- Shōkōshi Cedie
- sonic the hedgehog cd (heard in the opening & ending)
- Shūkan Storyland
- Space Runaway Ideon
- Uchū Ōji
- Watashi no Ashinaga Ojisan
- Wow, The Kid Gang of Bandits (Doraemon movie)

==== Hidenori Arai ====
- Bosukoa Adventure
- Ceres, Celestial Legend
- Chōkuse ni Narisō
- Dororonpa!
- Gu-Gu Ganmo
- Gun Frontier
- Karaoke Senshi Maiku Jirō
- Katapishi
- Lost Universe
- Mama wa Shōgaku Yonensei
- Miracle Girls
- Masked Ninja Red Shadow (anime series)
- Rainbowman (anime version)
- Shōnen Ashibe series
- Slayers series
- Tsuru Pika Hagemaru-kun

==== Masahiro Shōji ====
- Burn Up Scramble
- Cluster Edge
- Code Geass - Lelouch of the Rebellion
- Cyber Team in Akihabara
- Desert Punk
- Doraemon movie series
- Eden's Bowy
- éX-Driver
- Excel Saga
- F
- Gasaraki
- Genki Bakuhatsu Ganbarugā
- Gun X Sword
- Haibane Renmei
- Heisei Inu Monogatari Bau
- Idol Densetsu Eriko
- Infinite Ryvius
- Iria: Zeiram the Animation
- Kage Kara Mamoru!
- Legend of Heavenly Sphere Shurato
- Mahōjin Guru Guru series
- Martian Successor Nadesico
- Moero! Top Striker
- NG Knight Ramune & 40
- Omishi Magical Theater: Risky Safety
- Pigmalio
- Scryed
- Seven of Seven
- Silent Möbius
- Steam Detectives
- Super Gals! Kotobuki Ran
- VS. Knight Ramune & 40 Fire
- Yokohama Kaidashi Kikou
- Zettai Muteki Raijin-Oh

==== Mutsuhiro Nishimura ====
- Demon Lord Dante
- Elfen Lied
- Hikaru no Go
