= Miho Morikawa =

Japanese singer and model

- Born: May 5, 1968 (age 57); Osaka Prefecture, Japan
- Occupations: Singer, Professor
- Website: morikawamiho.com

Miho Morikawa (森川美穂, Morikawa Miho; born May 5, 1968, Osaka Prefecture, Japan) is a Japanese singer and model. She's currently a professor in the Music Performance Department at Osaka University of Arts.

== Biography ==
Miho Morikawa got her start at the age of 17 after winning a singing contest, which led to her first album, called Sentimental Times, in 1985. Soon after her debut, she started writing lyrics and eventually composing some of the songs as well. On her EP Holiday, Miho played the blues harp in some songs. Her 1992 album, Freestyle, debuted at No.10 on the Japanese Album Chart. She has done songs for several anime series; including "Blue Water" and "Yes I Will" from Fushigi no Umi no Nadia, "Positive" from Ranma ½, and "By Yourself" from a Dirty Pair OAV and "Yahoo!" the second opening of Kenichi: The Mightiest Disciple with Akira Asakura under the group name Diva x Diva.

In 2001, she appeared in the musical The Threepenny Opera directed by Yukio Ninagawa. In 2003, she left the Yamaha Music Foundation after working with them for 19 years, returning to Osaka, then in 2004 played the lead role of Amneris in a Shiki production of Aida. In 2007, Miho became a part-time lecturer at Osaka University of Arts, and is currently a professor in the Music Performance Department.

Since 2016, she has released a new album annually. In June 2024, she launched a weekly podcast.

== Discography ==
=== Studio albums ===
Year	Title	Label
1986	多感世代	Vap
1987	おんなになあれ	Vap
1987	Nude Voice	Vap
1988	½ Contrast	Vap
1988	Ow-witch!	Vap
1990	Vocalization	Eastworld
1991	Pop The Top!	Eastworld
1992	Freestyle	Eastworld
1993	A Holiday	Eastworld
1994	情熱の瞳	Eastworld
1995	Hallow	TM Factory
1996	Solista	TM Factory
1998	Tasty	TM Factory
2000	Lost&Found	TM Factory
2010	Glad	Hoy-Hoy Records
2012	森川美穂夏祭り～森川魂～ 名古屋公演	Bellwood Records
2016	Life Is Beautiful	築音堂
2017	Be Free Best Collection	Japan Record, Tokuma Japan Communications
2018	Female	La Vie
2019	Another Face -Tribute To Gorō Matsui + Kōji Tamaki-	La Vie
2020	ひとり夏フェス 2020.08.23	Hoy-Hoy Records
2021	I・N・G	La Vie
2022	Love Letter	La Vie
2023	Brightest	La Vie
2024	Mifo	La Vie
2025	Legendary	La Vie

=== Singles ===
Year	Title	Label
1985	教室	Vap
1985	ブルーな嵐	Vap
1986	姫様ズーム・イン	Vap
1986	赤い涙	Vap
1986	サーフサイド・ブリーズ〜真夏の風	Vap
1987	おんなになあれ	Vap
1987	Pride	Vap
1988	Be Free	Vap
1988	わかりあいたい	Vap
1988	Real Mind	Vap
1989	チャンス	Vap
1990	Blue Water	Eastworld
1990	心のパーキング・ゾーン	Eastworld
1991	Lovin’ You	Eastworld
1992	Tsubasa Ni Kaete	Eastworld
1993	君が君でいるために	Eastworld
1995	Close Your Eyes	TM Factory
2020	HERE WITH ME	Yamaha
2021	いつかは昔のことになる	Yamaha

=== Compilations ===
Year	Title	Label
1989	Time-ize	Vap
1992	Voices	Eastworld
1996	Her-Best	TM Factory
1997	Her-Best II	TM Factory
2004	Golden☆Best	Eastworld
2007	Vap Single Collection	Vivid Sound
2020	Very Best Songs 35	Yamaha
