= Hiroshi Arikawa =

Japanese actor and voice actor (1940–2011)

- Born: November 2, 1940; Kagoshima, Japan
- Died: October 16, 2011 (aged 70); Komae, Tokyo, Japan
- Occupations: Actor, voice actor
- Years active: 1963–2011

Hiroshi Arikawa (有川博, Arikawa Hiroshi; November 2, 1940 – October 16, 2011) was a Japanese actor and voice actor from Kagoshima Prefecture affiliated with Engekishūdan En.

Formerly affiliated with Gekidan Haiyūza, Arikawa enrolled in Gekidan Kumo in 1965. It wasn't until 1975 that Arikawa would enroll in Engekishūdan En. On October 16, 2011, he died of acute respiratory failure.

== Filmography ==
=== Film ===
- Hibotan bakuto: Tekkaba retsuden (1969)
- Seito Shokun! (1984)
- Early Spring Story (1985)
- Matamata abunai deka (1988) - Attorney
- Hashire! Shiroi okami (1990) - Cal (voice)
- Sharaku (1995) - Tsuruya Kiemon
- Berserk: The Golden Age Arc (2012) - Hassan (voice) (final film role)

=== Television drama ===
- Fuun Lion-Maru (1973) - Koreshinji Tamakage
- Shinsengumi (1973) - Okita Sōji
- Mito Kōmon (1975–2010) - Kudō Shinpachirō, Kyōnosuke Tachibana, Abe Masatake, etc.
- Hissatsu Shōbainin (1978) - Sakaguchi
- Tokugawa Ieyasu (1983) - Ōtani Yoshitsugu
- Haru no Hatō (1985) - Uchimura Kanzō
- Sanada Taiheiki (1985–1986) - Doi Toshikatsu
- Choujinki Metalder (1987) - Shinware Kōki
- Dokuganryū Masamune (1987) - Shinjō Danjō
- Tabaruzaka (1987) - Yamagata Aritomo
- Bayside Shakedown (1997) - First District Police Headquarters Manager
- Seijuu Sentai Gingaman (1998) - Elder Ōgi

=== Theater ===
- Romeo and Juliet (1970) (Romeo)
- Hamlet (1983) (Horatio)
- My Fair Lady (1990) (Colonel Pickering)
- 'Tis Pity She's a Whore (2006) (Donado)

=== Television animation ===
- Georgie! (1983) (Skiffins)
- Monster (2004) (Richard Braun)
- Ergo Proxy (2006) (Hoody)
- Kenichi: The Mightiest Disciple (2006) (Hayato Fūrinji)
- Shōnen Onmyōji (2006) (Tenkū)
- Tegami Bachi (2009) (Narrator)
- Bunny Drop (2011) (Sōichi Kaga)

=== Theatrical animation ===
- Eden of the East: Paradise Lost (2010) (Saizo Ato/Mr. Outside)
- Berserk: The Golden Age Arc I - The Egg of the King (2012) (Hassan)

=== Video games ===
- Glass Rose (2003) (Denemon Yoshinodou)
- Kingdom Hearts Birth by Sleep (2010) (Merlin)

=== Dubbing roles ===
==== Live-action ====
- Ian McKellen
  - The Lord of the Rings: The Fellowship of the Ring (Gandalf)
  - The Lord of the Rings: The Two Towers (Gandalf)
  - The Lord of the Rings: The Return of the King (Gandalf)
  - X2 (Magneto)
  - X-Men: The Last Stand (Magneto)
- 20,000 Leagues Under the Sea (2002 NHK-BS2 edition) (Captain Nemo (Michael Caine))
- The Avengers (Sir August De Wynter (Sean Connery))
- Bad Company (Officer Oakes (Anthony Hopkins))
- The Big Lebowski (VHS/DVD edition) (Jeffrey "The Big" Lebowski (David Huddleston))
- The Chorus (Pierre Morhange (Jacques Perrin))
- Columbo (Patrick McGoohan)
- Die Hard (1990 TV Asahi edition) (Hans Gruber (Alan Rickman))
- Dreamer (Pop Crane (Kris Kristofferson))
- ER (Doctor Carl Vucelich (Ron Rifkin))
- Executive Decision (1999 TV Asahi edition) (Nagi Hassan (David Suchet))
- Fair Game (Colonel Ilya Kazak (Steven Berkoff))
- Hard to Kill (1994 TV Asahi edition) (Senator Vernon Trent (William Sadler))
- The Incredible Hulk (David Banner (Bill Bixby))
- Knight Rider (Michael Knight (David Hasselhoff))
- L.A. Confidential (Capt. Dudley Smith (James Cromwell))
- The Lake House (Simon J. Wyler (Christopher Plummer))
- Little Voice (Ray Say (Michael Caine))
- The Mask of Zorro (Don Rafael Montero (Stuart Wilson))
- Misery (Paul Sheldon (James Caan))
- The Missing (Samuel Jones / Chaa-duu-ba-its-iidan (Tommy Lee Jones))
- Mission: Impossible 2 (2006 TV Asahi edition) (Mission Commander Swanbeck (Anthony Hopkins))
- Presumed Innocent (Alejandro "Sandy" Stern (Raul Julia))
- The Silence of the Lambs (Jack Crawford (Scott Glenn))
- Super Mario Bros. (1994 NTV edition) (President Koopa (Dennis Hopper))
- Terrahawks (Tiger Ninestein)
- True Grit (Rooster Cogburn (Jeff Bridges))

==== Animation ====
- Flushed Away (The Toad)
- Pocahontas (Governor Ratcliffe)
- Pocahontas II: Journey to a New World (Governor Ratcliffe)
- Ratatouille (Auguste Gusteau)
