= Kana Yazumi =

Japanese singer-songwriter

Kana Yazumi 矢住 夏菜
- Born: August 13, 1985 (age 40); Kawasaki, Kanagawa, Japan
- Origin: Kawasaki, Kanagawa, Japan
- Genres: J-pop
- Occupation(s): Singer, songwriter
- Instrument: Vocals
- Website: http://yazumi.net

Kana Yazumi (矢住 夏菜, Yazumi Kana; born August 13, 1985, in, Kawasaki, Kanagawa Prefecture), is a Japanese singer-songwriter. Her second single "Be Strong" was used as the first opening theme of the anime series Kenichi: The Mightiest Disciple.

== Discography ==
=== Singles ===
- "Fall" (May 26, 2006)
- "Be Strong" (February 7, 2007) ranked 197th at Oricon singles charts
- "Perfect Fit/Deep Forest" (September 24, 2008,) ranked 166th at Oricon singles charts
- "Slave" (August 26, 2009)
- "Happiness" (November 4, 2009) featured in the video game Rune Factory 3

=== Albums ===
- Document (May 16, 2007,)
- Mysterious Circle (May 26, 2010)
- Red Blood Cell (March 8, 2013)
