= Persia, the Magic Fairy =

Magical girl media franchise

- Illustration of Riki and Gaku Muroi with Persia Hayami by Yoshiyuki Kishi

魔法の妖精ペルシャ (Mahō no Yōsei Perusha)
- Genre: Magical girl
- Created by: Takako Aonuma
- Anime television series
- Directed by: Takashi Anno (chief director)
- Produced by: Toru Horikoshi (NTV); Minoru Ono (Yomiko); Masaaki Fusekawa (Studio Pierrot)
- Written by: Sukehiro Tomita
- Music by: Kōji Makaino
- Studio: Studio Pierrot
- Original network: NNS (NTV)
- Original run: July 6, 1984 – May 31, 1985
- Episodes: 48
- Original video animation

Persia, the Magic Fairy: Merry-go-Round
- Directed by: Takashi Anno (chief director)
- Music by: Kōji Makaino
- Studio: Studio Pierrot
- Released: September 25, 1987
- Runtime: 45 minutes

Persia, the Magic Fairy (魔法の妖精 ペルシャ, Mahō no Yōsei Perusha) is a magical girl anime television series produced by Studio Pierrot which aired on Nippon Television from July 1984 to May 1985. It is an adaptation of the manga series by Takako Aonuma titled Persia ga Suki!. In addition to the TV series, two OVAs were released, and the main character, Persia, also appeared in two other Studio Pierrot special presentations. This was the second of six magical girl anime to be created by Studio Pierrot, and featured the character designs of Yoshiyuki Kishi, who did the character designs for Pierrot's next magical girl series Magical Emi, the Magic Star, is also credited as the series's character designer and animation director.

== Story ==
11-year old Persia is an energetic, caring, loyal and happy young girl who has grown up alongside the animals on the Serengeti plains of Africa. She is wearing only a leopard skin during her stay there. Twins Riki and Gaku Muroi and their grandfather, Gōken, bring Persia to Japan with them in Minato-machi (lit. Port Town), where she lives with a couple who own a grocery store.

Because of an incident during the return flight to Japan, Persia finds herself in the "Lovely Dream", the land where dreams are born and grow. It is a wintry place, and dreams cannot get out. The Fairy Queen appears before Persia in the form of a butterfly, and explains that the Lovely Dream is in danger, requesting Persia's help. She gives Persia a magical golden headband with a star which reacts to the word "Papurikko". With it, Persia can conjure a magic baton which bridges her world and Lovely Dream, as well as transform into an older self by saying "Perukko Raburin Kurukuru Rinkuru".

Persia is sent with three kappa back into the regular world with the mission of collecting love energy to thaw the frozen Lovely Dream.

== Characters ==
Persia Hayami (速水ペルシャ, Hayami Perusha)
Voiced by: Miina Tominaga
After visiting the Lovely Dream, Persia gains a magical headband with which she can summon a magical baton to transform into a teenager and perform magic. At the beginning she is in love with both Riki and Gaku Muroi, later she will realize her love for Gaku, feeling jealousy for him many times. She can be irresponsible with her magic, for example using it to bring her pet lion Simba to Japan.

Gaku Muroi (室井学, Muroi Gaku)
Voiced by: Keiichi Nanba
Twin brother of Riki and grandson of Gōken, he cares a lot of Persia and he will realize he is falling in love with her.

Riki Muroi (室井力, Muroi Riki)
Voiced by: Yū Mizushima
Twin brother of Gaku and grandson of Gōken, he cares for Persia Hayami as if she were his little sister. He is dating Sayo Mitomo.

Sayo Mitomo (御友小夜, Mitomo Sayo)
Voiced by: Saeko Shimazu
Girlfriend of Riki Muroi.

Gera Gera (ゲラゲラ, Gera Gera)
Voiced by: Shigeru Chiba
One of the kappa from the Lovely Dream who accompany Persia, he wears an orange shirt and often scolds Persia when she does something irresponsible. His name means "guffawing".

Meso Meso (メソメソ, Meso Meso)
Voiced by: Sukekiyo Kameyama
One of the kappa from the Lovely Dream who accompany Persia, he is something of a coward and wears a red bow tie. His name comes from a Japanese psychomime for the sound of whimpering, possibly due to his cowardly nature.

Puri Puri (プリプリ)
Voiced by: Yūko Mita
One of the kappa from the Lovely Dream who accompany Persia, Puri Puri is a girl kappa. She wears a pink purse over her shoulder. Her name comes from an onomatopoeia meaning "huffing", probably due to her habit of scolding Persia.

Simba (シンバ, Shinba)
Voiced by: Daisuke Gōri
A lion from Africa, Simba is Persia's best friend. She used her magic to bring him to Japan, then to transform him into a cat so that he could stay with her. Her magic also allows him to speak in the human language.

Hideki Hayami (速水英樹, Hayami Hideki)
Voiced by: Akio Nojima
Husband of Kumi and adopted father of Persia, Hideki runs a grocery store with his wife.

Kumi Hayami (速水久美, Hayami Kumi)
Voiced by: Gara Takashima
Wife of Hideki and adopted mother of Persia, Kumi runs a grocery store with her husband.

Gōken Muroi (室井剛健, Muroi Gōken)
Voiced by: Yuzuru Fujimoto
Grandfather of Gaku and Riki, Gōken brought Persia to Japan and helps her to settle into Japanese life.

Yoyoko Manabe (真鍋よよ子, Manabe Yoyoko)
Voiced by: Sakurako Kishiro
A girl in Persia's class, she has a huge crush on Gaku and dreams of being with him. She is jealous of Persia because she gets to spend time with Gaku.

Akanuma-sensei (赤沼先生, Akanuma-sensei)
Voiced by: Hideyuki Tanaka

Bon Bon (ボンボン, Bon Bon)
Voiced by: Masako Sugaya

Fairy (妖精, Yōsei)
Voiced by: Yōko Asagami

Fairy (フェアリ, Feari)
Voiced by: Maiko Okamoto (episode 19) and Yuriko Yamamoto (episode 47)

Kenji Sawaki (沢木研二, Sawaki Kenji)
Voiced by: Kazuhiko Inoue

School Principal (校長先生, Kōchō-sensei)
Voiced by: Ikuya Sawaki

Kishin Shinokawa (篠川紀信, Shinokawa Kishin)
Voiced by: Yuriko Fuchizaki

Tōta Fuyuki (冬木 冬太, Fuyuki Tōta)

== Music ==
=== Original songs ===
By Maiko Okamoto

1. Tripper In A Strange Land (Japanese: 見知らぬ国のトリッパー, Hepburn: Mishiranukuni no Toripar) (OP 1)
2. Lovely Dream (Japanese: ラブリードリーム, Hepburn: Lovely Dream) (ED 1)

By MIMA

1. Don't be Fashionable (Japanese: おしゃれめさるな, Hepburn: Osyaremesaruna) (OP 2)

By Miina Tominaga

1. I love Simba (Japanese: だいすきシンバ, Hepburn: Daisuki Simba) (ED 2)

== Manga ==
- I Love Persia!
- Cover of volume 5 of the bunkoban release of Persia

ペルシャがすき! (Perusha ga Suki!)
- Manga
- Written by: Takako Aonuma
- Published by: Shueisha
- Magazine: Weekly Margaret
- Original run: January 1984 – November 1985
- Volumes: 9

The manga, I Love Persia! (ペルシャがすき!, Perusha ga Suki!), was serialized in Weekly Margaret magazine from 1984 through October 1985, and released as nine tankōbon published by Shueisha. It was republished in 2000 and 2001 in bunkoban format as six volumes.

=== Original release ===
- Volume 1: ISBN 4-08-850851-3
- Volume 2: ISBN 4-08-850867-X
- Volume 3: ISBN
- Volume 4: ISBN 4-08-850879-3
- Volume 5: ISBN 4-08-850888-2
- Volume 6: ISBN 4-08-850889-0
- Volume 7: ISBN 4-08-850892-0
- Volume 8: ISBN 4-08-850893-9
- Volume 9: ISBN 4-08-850894-7

=== Bunkoban ===
- Volume 1: ISBN 4-08-617638-6
- Volume 2: ISBN 4-08-617639-4
- Volume 3: ISBN 4-08-617640-8
- Volume 4: ISBN 4-08-617641-6
- Volume 5: ISBN 4-08-617667-X
- Volume 6: ISBN 4-08-617668-8

== Impact and influence ==
Persia stars in Adesugata Mahou no Sannin Musume, along with Creamy Mami and Magical Emi. She is also in Majokko Club Yoningumi A-Kukan Kara no Alien X, with Creamy Mami, Magical Emi and Pastel Yumi. The series was parodied in the 1985 hentai OVA Mahou no Rouge Lipstick.

== Internationalization ==
Magical Fairy Persia was released and dubbed into Italian as Evelyn e la magia di un sogno d'amore by Studio PV. It was first broadcast on Italia 1 in September 1985, and was first broadcast on Italia Teen Television on July 8, 2004. It was also released in French as Vanessa et la Magie des Rêves on February 13, 1988.
