= Kenichi: The Mightiest Disciple =

Japanese manga series

- First tankōbon volume cover, featuring Kenichi Shirahama (left) and Miu Fūrinji

史上最強の弟子ケンイチ (Shijō Saikyō no Deshi: Ken'ichi)
- Genre: Adventure; Comedy; Martial arts
- Manga

Tatakae! Ryōzanpaku Shijō Saikyō no Deshi
- Written by: Syun Matsuena
- Published by: Shogakukan
- Imprint: Shōnen Sunday Comics
- Magazine: Shōnen Sunday Super
- Original run: October 20, 1999 – February 25, 2002
- Volumes: 5
- Manga
- Written by: Syun Matsuena
- Published by: Shogakukan
- Imprint: Shōnen Sunday Comics
- Magazine: Weekly Shōnen Sunday
- Original run: April 17, 2002 – September 17, 2014
- Volumes: 61
Further information
Anime television series
Directed by	Hajime Kamegaki
Produced by	Susumu Matsuyama; Tetsu Kojima
Written by	Yoshiyuki Suga
Music by	Joe Rinoie
Studio	TMS Entertainment
Licensed by	NA: Discotek Media; UK: Manga Entertainment
Original network	TXN (TV Tokyo)
English network	US: Funimation Channel
Original run	October 8, 2006 – September 29, 2007
Episodes	50
Manga
Shijō Saikyō no Deshi Ken'ichi Plus
Written by	Syun Matsuena
Published by	Shogakukan
Imprint	Shōnen Sunday Comics
Magazine	Shōnen Sunday S
Original run	February 25, 2012 – April 25, 2012
Volumes	1
Original video animation
Kenichi: The Mightiest Disciple – The Attack of Darkness
Directed by	Hiroshi Ishiodori
Produced by	Junya Okamoto; Atsushi Chiku; Jukko Ozawa
Written by	Eizo Kobayashi
Music by	Keiji Inai
Studio	Brain's Base
Licensed by	NA: Discotek Media; SEA: Muse Communication
Released	March 14, 2012 – May 16, 2014
Episodes	11
Manga
Shijō Saikyō no Deshi Kenichi 2: Tatsujin-hen
Written by	Syun Matsuena
Published by	Shogakukan
Magazine	Sunday Webry
Original run	March 25, 2026 – present
Volumes	2
- icon

Kenichi: The Mightiest Disciple (Japanese: 史上最強の弟子ケンイチ, Hepburn: Shijō Saikyō no Deshi Ken'ichi; lit. 'Kenichi: History's Strongest Disciple') is a Japanese manga series written and illustrated by Syun Matsuena. Matsuena first published a manga titled Tatakae! Ryōzanpaku Shijō Saikyō no Deshi, which ran in Shogakukan's Shōnen Sunday Super from October 1999 to February 2002. Kenichi: The Mightiest Disciple is a remake of the series, and was serialized in Shogakukan's Weekly Shōnen Sunday from April 2002 to September 2014, with its chapters collected in 61 tankōbon volumes.

The series follows Kenichi Shirahama, a bullied high school student whose life is completely transformed after he meets Miu Fūrinji, a talented martial artist. Miu introduces Kenichi to Ryōzanpaku, a legendary dojo where he learns various martial arts styles from the dojo's six eccentric masters. Through their intense training, Kenichi grows stronger and is forced to battle the delinquent gang Ragnarok and the shadow organization Yami.

A 50-episode anime television series adaptation produced by TMS Entertainment aired on TV Tokyo from October 2006 to September 2007. Brain's Base produced an 11-episode original video animation (OVA) series, titled Kenichi: The Mightiest Disciple – The Attack of Darkness, released between March 2012 and May 2014. The anime television series was licensed in North America by Funimation in 2008; the rights to the series expired in 2018 and it was re-licensed by Discotek Media in 2020.

The Kenichi: The Mightiest Disciple manga has had over 12 million copies in circulation. A manga sequel, Shijō Saikyō no Deshi Kenichi 2: Tatsujin-hen, started on the Sunday Webry digital platform in March 2026.

== Plot ==
The story centers on Kenichi Shirahama, a 15-year-old high school student who has long endured bullying. After befriending transfer student Miu Fūrinji, he resolves to strengthen himself and accompanies her to Ryōzanpaku, a dojo overseen by her grandfather, the undefeated martial artist Hayato Fūrinji, where several masters of diverse disciplines reside. Following basic instruction from Miu, Kenichi defeats a prominent member of the school's karate club, drawing the attention of delinquents. Initially training for self-defense, he eventually becomes a full disciple of Ryōzanpaku and develops feelings for Miu. His routine alternates between training under the dojo's six masters and confronting members of "Ragnarok", a gang of bullies seeking either to recruit or defeat him.

After Ragnarok's dissolution, Kenichi and Miu face Yomi—disciples trained by masters of Yami, a rival organization to Ryōzanpaku. While Ryōzanpaku adheres to the principle of sparing opponents (Katsujin-ken), Yami embraces lethal methods (Satsujin-ken). The conflict between the factions escalates until a final confrontation over Yami's goal to instigate global chaos, termed "The Eternal Sunset". Following the prevention of this scheme and Yami's defeat, both organizations disband. Kenichi continues his training at Ryōzanpaku; years later, he emerges as a renowned novelist, with implications that he marries Miu and surpasses her grandfather's martial prowess—fulfilling Hayato's vow that Miu may only wed someone capable of defeating him.

The sequel series takes place a few months after Yami's defeat. Ryōzanpaku is faced with a new crisis when the Kuremisago Clan appears. This ancient clan of martial artists is fighting for the family's succession. Some members want Miu, the daughter of the previous leader's daughter, to assume the position, while others want to kill her to prevent it. Meanwhile, Kenichi and his friends find some pages of an ancient scroll containing the Kuremisago's most dangerous techniques and secrets, and they decide to collect the rest, fighting old and new enemies along the way.

== Main characters ==
Kenichi Shirahama (白浜 兼一, Shirahama Ken'ichi)
Voiced by: Tomokazu Seki (Japanese); Jessie James Grelle (English)
Kenichi is a second year high school student. The story follows him as he continues to train, and eventually live, at the Ryozanpaku dojo, fighting increasingly capable enemies. He lacks any form of sakki (killer intent) and adheres to a strict code of morals. As a result, Kenichi has made many friends, mostly of former enemies, and wins the affections of Renka Ma, Miu, Izumi, and Li Raichi.
Miu Fūrinji (風林寺 美羽, Fūrinji Miu)
Voiced by: Tomoko Kawakami (TV series), Rie Kugimiya (OVA) (Japanese); Carrie Savage (English)
Kenichi's classmate and love interest. Miu came into Hayato's care when his son murdered several of his friends and his wife, sparing Miu by accident. Thereafter Miu learned martial arts from her grandfather. Miu is often clumsy among her fellows, and requires Kenichi's support in making friends. Miu has a great fondness for kittens and becomes hostile towards anyone who harms one. She is prone to rash decisions in money-making.
Hayato Fūrinji (風林寺 隼人, Fūrinji Hayato)
Voiced by: Hiroshi Arikawa (TV series), Yuzuru Fujimoto (OVA) (Japanese); R. Bruce Elliott (English)
Miu's grandfather and the elder of the Ryōzanpaku Dojo. He is tall, muscular, and possesses tremendous vitality despite his advanced age and is known for never having lost a fight in his entire life. Hayato is a kind old man but still possesses a reckless streak and can be arrogant. He is fond of Kenichi, calling him "Ken-chan", and is the only one who apologizes to him for difficult exercises. He also realizes Kenichi's feelings for Miu but declares that he will only allow Kenichi to marry her if he defeats him in a fight.
Shio Sakaki (逆鬼 至緒, Sakaki Shio)
Voiced by: Unshō Ishizuka (Japanese); Christopher Sabat (English)
A 30-year-old master of karate. He is a tall man almost always seen wearing a leather jacket and has a long scar across the bridge of his nose. He is often depicted as fierce in conversation and embarrassed by trivial things, and tends to quarrel with others, especially Apachai. He also gambles and drinks frequently and often places bets on Kenichi.
Apachai Hopachai (アパチャイ・ホパチャイ, Apachai Hopachai)
Voiced by: Hiroya Ishimaru (Japanese); Sonny Strait (English)
A 28-year-old master of Muay Thai and is known as the "Grim Reaper" of the Muay Thai underworld fighting circuit. He is tall and powerfully built, has tanned skin, and is usually seen wearing a tank top and shorts with bandages wrapped around his hands and feet. Apachai has been fighting life or death battles in underground Muay Thai fights since he was a teenager.
Shigure Kōsaka (香坂 しぐれ, Kōsaka Shigure)
Voiced by: Mamiko Noto (Japanese); Trina Nishimura (English)
A 23-year-old ninja and weapons master, who dresses in a small pink kimono; underneath she wears bandages over her chest and a fundoshi. When fighting seriously, she dons chain mail. She has a pet mouse named Tōchūmaru (闘忠丸) who is also a weapons master.
Akisame Kōetsuji (岬越寺 秋雨, Kōetsuji Akisame)
Voiced by: Jūrōta Kosugi (Japanese); Kent Williams (English)
A 38-year-old Jujitsu master, and the first master to train Kenichi. He is an old friend of Miu's father, Saiga. Despite his apparent fragility, he is immensely strong and capable, and can easily interpret other characters' unspoken thoughts. Additionally he has mastered calligraphy, painting, pottery, and sculpting, and builds contraptions as both training devices for Kenichi and power sources for the dojo, including a treadmill generator. He also owns an orthopedic clinic and can reset bones with ease. He has proved to be a good trauma surgeon also, and speaks Russian fluently.
Kensei Ma (馬 剣星, Ba/Ma Kensei)
Voiced by: Issei Futamata (Japanese); Vic Mignogna (TV series), Daniel J. Edwards (OVA) (English)
A 42-year-old master of Chinese Kenpō. He is short, balding, and always wears a hat. He has been training in martial arts since he was very young and was the leader of a large martial arts alliance in China, which has 10,000 followers, which he left behind. He has a wife and three children in China. Kenichi has absolute trust in Ma and has stated that he has never questioned his convictions as a martial artist.
Haruo Niijima (新島 春男, Niijima Haruo)
Voiced by: Takumi Yamazaki (Japanese); Todd Haberkorn (English)
A member of the Newspaper Club at Kenichi's school and has a broad range of expertise, including stealth, lock picking, tinkering, programming, and blackmailing. He retreats from most physical danger; but is also a skilled tactician.

== Media ==
=== Manga ===
Manga author Syun Matsuena first published a manga series titled Tatakae! Ryōzanpaku Shijō Saikyō no Deshi (戦え!梁山泊 史上最強の弟子; lit. 'Fight! Ryōzanpaku, History's Strongest Disciple'), which ran for 28 chapters in Shogakukan's monthly magazine Shōnen Sunday Super from October 20, 1999, to February 25, 2002. Its chapters were collected in five tankōbon volumes, released from September 18, 2000, to April 18, 2002. Shogakukan started releasing a 13-volume collector's edition on August 18, 2026.

Matsuena would later release the remake, Kenichi: The Mightiest Disciple, which started in Shogakukan's Weekly Shōnen Sunday on April 17, 2002. (Note: It started in the magazine's 20th issue of 2002 (cover dated May 1), released on April 17 of the same year.) The manga finished after 12 years of publication in the magazine on September 17, 2014. Shogakukan collected the 583 individual chapters in 61 tankōbon volumes, published under the Shōnen Sunday Comics imprint, from August 9, 2002, to February 18, 2015.

A spin-off, titled Shijō Saikyō no Deshi Ken'ichi Plus (史上最強の弟子ケンイチ プラス, Shijō Saikyō no Deshi Ken'ichi Purasu), was serialized for three chapters in Shōnen Sunday S from February 25 to April 25, 2012; the chapters were collected in a single volume by Shogakukan, released on September 18 of that same year.

In January 2026, Matsuena announced on his X account a sequel series, titled Shijō Saikyō no Deshi Kenichi 2: Tatsujin-hen (史上最強の弟子ケンイチ2 達人編; 'Kenichi: The Mightiest Disciple 2 – Masters Arc'), which started on Shogakukan's Sunday Webry digital platform on March 25, 2026. Shogakukn released its first volume on August 18, 2026. As of October 16, 2026, two volumes have been released.

=== Anime ===
A 50-episode anime television series adaptation by TMS Entertainment was broadcast on TV Tokyo from October 8, 2006, to September 29, 2007. The first opening theme for episodes 1–25 is "Be Strong", performed by Kana Yazumi, and the second opening theme for episodes 26–50 is "Yahhoo" (ヤッホー, Yahhō), performed by Diva × Diva (Miho Morikawa with Akira Asakura). The series' first ending theme for episodes 1–15 is "Kimi Ga Irukara" (君がいるから; lit. 'Because You Are There'), performed by Issei Eguchi. The second ending theme for episodes 16–25 is "Catch Your Dream", performed by Joanna Koike. The third ending theme for episodes 26–45 is "Run Over", performed by Joanna Koike. The fourth ending theme for episodes 46–49 is "Kokoro Kara no Message" (心からのメッセージ; lit. 'A Message from Heart') is performed by Sakura. The series' last episode uses the first opening theme "Be Strong" by Kana Yazumi as ending theme.

In North America the series was licensed by Funimation in May 2008. The series was broadcast on Funimation Channel. The rights to the series expired in 2018. In December 2020, Discotek Media announced that they had licensed the anime television and would have an upscale release slated for 2021; it was released on two Blu-ray Disc sets on August 31, 2021, and January 25, 2022. The series returned to Funimation's streaming service in May 2021. Crunchyroll added the series to their catalog in September 2021.

=== Original video animation ===
An 11-episode original video animation (OVA) series produced by Brain's Base started on March 14, 2012. The story continues from the Ragnarok Arc entering the Yomi arc. The second OVA episode, featuring later story in the Yomi arc, was released on June 18, 2012. The third OVA episode was released on November 16, 2012. The fourth and fifth OVA episodes were released on September 16, 2013. The sixth and seventh OVA episodes were released on November 18, 2013. The eighth and ninth OVA episodes were released on February 14, 2014. The 10th and 11th OVA episodes were released on May 16, 2014. The main cast for the OVA series is the same from those of the anime series except for Rie Kugimiya who replaced Tomoko Kawakami as Miu and Yuzuru Fujimoto who replaced Hiroshi Arikawa as her grandfather Hayato. The episodes aired in 2014 on Tokyo MX and BS11, with the title Kenichi: The Mightiest Disciple – The Attack of Darkness (史上最強の弟子ケンイチ 闇の襲撃, Shijō Saikyō no Deshi Ken'ichi Yami no Shūgeki). Iori Nomizu performed the opening theme "Wish" (for episodes 4–9) and the ending themes "Glory Days" (for episodes 1–3) and "Breathless" (for episodes 4–9). During its television broadcast, the series featured the opening theme "Higher Ground", performed by Tomokazu Seki, and the same original second ending theme "Breathless", by Iori Nomizu.

In January 2024, Discotek Media announced that it had licensed the OVA, and was released on a Blu-ray set with an English dub on May 28 of the same year.

=== Video games ===
On March 15, 2007, Capcom released the series' first game, Shijō Saikyō no Deshi Ken'ichi: Gekitō! Ragnarok Hachikengō, exclusively on the PlayStation 2. The game was developed with Eighting.

Kenichi Shirahama appeared in the Weekly Shōnen Sunday and Weekly Shōnen Magazine 2009 crossover fighting game Sunday vs Magazine: Shūketsu! Chōjō Daikessen. Characters from the series also appeared in another crossover game of the same magazine, Shōnen Sunday & Shōnen Magazine White Comic, also released in 2009 for Nintendo DS.

=== Other media ===
A gaiden volume was released by Shogakukan on September 18, 2007. An official guidebook was released by Shogakukan on May 16, 2014.

== Reception ==
By February 2012, the manga had over 12 million copies in circulation.

Bamboo Dong of Anime News Network (ANN) offered a negative assessment of the first season (part one), criticizing its repetitive nature and inconsistent tone, which struggled to balance between mindless action and a semi-serious martial arts narrative. Dong found the technical explanations of combat techniques lacking compared to series like Naruto, despite the latter featuring fictional abilities. The review concluded by suggesting the show might only appeal to younger viewers seeking confidence-building stories, as it failed to engage older audiences. However, Dong later reviewed the first season (part two) more favorably, praising its improved focus on Kenichi's martial arts progression over his initial transformation from a weakling. The fanservice, while present, was deemed appropriate, and Miu was highlighted as a strong female lead. The series was recommended for fans of Naruto, Bleach, and other Shōnen Jump titles due to its action and grounded combat.

Theron Martin, also writing for ANN, likened the first season (part one) to The Karate Kid (1984) but noted its lighter tone, which helped mitigate its often absurd scenarios. While criticizing its early pacing and comedic excesses, Martin praised its exploration of martial arts fundamentals and concluded that despite its flaws, the series delivered an entertaining, if cheesy, experience.

Davey C. Jones of Active Anime lauded the first season (part one) for its dynamic fights and humor, calling it a perfect blend of comedy and martial arts action. In reviewing the second season (part two), Jones compared it favorably to Ranma ½, emphasizing its energetic combat and comedic appeal.

C.M. Brendelson of Otaku USA described Kenichi as a typical underdog protagonist akin to Peter Parker, while Miu stood out as both highly skilled and visually striking. The series was noted for its focus on Kenichi's growth through defeat rather than a desire for supremacy, and while fanservice was prevalent, it did not overshadow the narrative. Brendelson concluded that the show, while not universally appealing, offered a lighthearted mix of action and comedy.

Allen Moody of THEM Anime Reviews praised Kenichi as a relatable protagonist with strong moral convictions, along with the series' action and character dynamics. However, he criticized excessive melodrama during fight sequences.

== See also ==
- Waza no Tabibito, another manga by the same author
- Tokiwa Kitareri!!, another manga series by the same author
- Kimi wa 008, another manga series by the same author
