= Yuzuru Fujimoto =

Japanese actor (1935–2019)

- 藤本 譲
- Born: Taijō Fujimoto (藤本 泰譲); September 24, 1935; Tokyo Prefecture, Japan
- Died: June 10, 2019 (aged 83); Minato, Tokyo, Japan
- Occupation: Voice actor
- Years active: 1953–2019
- Agent: 81 Produce
- Spouse: 1
- Website: Official profile

Taijō Fujimoto (藤本 泰譲, Fujimoto Taijō; September 24, 1935 – June 10, 2019) known professionally as Yuzuru Fujimoto (藤本 譲, Fujimoto Yuzuru), was a Japanese voice actor.

== Biography ==
He was a Rissho University graduate.

In 1953, he joined the Sogei theater company.

After joining the Sogei theater company, he affiliated with the theater company Doujinkai, Enkyo Pro, Taiyo Promotion, Ezaki Productions, Office Chuo, and Production Baobab throughout his career before joining 81 Produce on August 1, 2009, where he was affiliated with until his death.

Fujimoto made his anime voice acting debut as the narrator of Gigantor in 1963.

In 2016, he stepped down from all regular roles due to health issues, and had been in recovery for some time until his death.

=== Death ===
Fujimoto died of heart failure on June 10, 2019, at the age of 83. His death was announced days later on June 17 on 81 Produce's website.

== Filmography ==
=== Television animation ===
1960s

- Gigantor (1963) – Narrator
- Ōgon Bat (1967) – Narrator
- Humanoid Monster Bem (1968) – Narrator

1970s

- Science Ninja Team Gatchaman (1972) – A detective
- Doraemon (1973) – Papa
- Brave Raideen (1975) – Professor Steam
- Gaiking (1975) – Namura
- Blocker Gundan 4 Machine Blaster (1976) – Yoshitarō Harao
- Nobody's Boy: Remi (1977–1978) – Policeman (episode 10)
- Paul's Miraculous Adventure (1977) – Gabriel
- Angie Girl (1978) – Johann

1980s

- Astro Boy (1980) – Professor Ikisugi
- Invincible Robo Trider G7 (1980) – Tetsuo Atsui
- Ninja Hattori-kun (1981) – Kentarō Mitsuba
- Ginga Hyōryū Vifam 13 (1983) – Frederick Roden
- Magical Fairy Persia (1984) – Goken Muroi
- Princess Sarah (1985) – Mr. Barrow
- Mister Ajikko (1987) – Ajiō-sama
- Zillion (1987) – Gord
- Legend of Heavenly Sphere Shurato (1989) – Yūtarō Hidaka

1990s

- Armored Police Metal Jack (1991) – Megadeath
- Oishinbo (1991) – Takehara
- Mobile Suit Gundam Wing (1995) – Professor G
- After War Gundam X (1996) – Fong Alternative
- Detective Conan (1996) – Tani, Ōyama, Yabuuchi, Murakami, etc.
- Gasaraki (1998) – Giichirō Gōwa
- The Big O (1999) – Santa Claus
- Wild Arms: Twilight Venom (1999) – Kojima

2000s

- Hiwou War Chronicles (2000) – Nagai
- Samurai Girl: Real Bout High School (2001) – Tessai Onizuka
- Inuyasha (2001) – Mushin
- Ghost in the Shell: Stand Alone Complex (2002) – Kunihiko Nibu
- Croket! (2003) – Kusamochi
- Monster (2004) – Robbie
- Kenichi: The Mightiest Disciple (2007) – Hayato Fūrinji (2nd voice)
- Moyasimon: Tales of Agriculture (2007) – Kikuji Hiyoshi
- Hell Girl (2009) – Kadokura

2010s

- Dance in the Vampire Bund (2010) – Juneau Dermailles
- Inazuma Eleven (2010) – Daisuke Endō
- Katanagatari (2010) – Masatsuna Yanari
- Little Battlers Experience (2011) – Cillian Kaidō
- Garo: The Animation (2015) – Lara's grandfather

=== OVA ===
- Konpeki no Kantai (1993) – Yasaburo Otaka
- Please Save My Earth (1993) – Raozo Matsudaira
- Sohryuden: Legend of the Dragon Kings (1993) – Chiyou
- Iria: Zeiram the Animation (1994) – Dr. Touka
- Mobile Suit Gundam: The 08th MS Team (1996) – Kojima
- Sonic the Hedgehog (1996) – The President
- Apocalypse Zero (1996) – Tomohisa, Narrator

=== Theatrical animation ===
- Mobile Suit Gundam (1981) – Degwin Sodo Zabi
- Doraemon: Nobita and the Kingdom of Clouds (1992) – Resentative
- Pom Poko (1994) – Mizuki
- Case Closed: The Phantom of Baker Street (2002) – Colonel Moran
- Inuyasha the Movie: The Castle Beyond the Looking Glass (2002) – Mushin
- Appleseed (2004) – Edward Uranus III
- Pokémon: Arceus and the Jewel of Life (2009) – Tapp
- Doraemon: Nobita and the Island of Miracles—Animal Adventure (2012) – Ouro

=== Video games ===
- Gihren no Yabou (1998) – Degwin Sodo Zabi
- Metal Gear Solid (1998) – Kenneth Baker
- Metal Gear Solid 2: Sons of Liberty (2001) – President James Johnson
- Harukanaru Toki no Naka de 3 (2004) – Emperor Go-Shirakawa
- Super Robot Wars GC (2004) – Tetsuo Atsui, Great Dorumen
- Killzone 3 (2011) – Orlock (Japanese dub)

=== Dubbing ===
==== Live-action ====
- James Earl Jones
  - Coming to America – King Jaffe Joffer
  - The Ambulance (1992 TV Tokyo edition) – Lt. Frank Spencer
  - The Hunt for Red October (1993 TBS and 1999 TV Asahi editions) – Vice Admiral James Greer
  - Patriot Games (1999 TV Asahi edition) – Vice Admiral Jim Greer
  - The Sandlot – Mr. Mertle
  - Sommersby – Judge Barry Conrad Isaacs
  - Clear and Present Danger (1997 TV Asahi edition) – Vice Admiral Jim Greer
- Pat Hingle
  - Batman (1995 TV Asahi edition) – James Gordon
  - Batman Returns (1994 TV Asahi edition) – James Gordon
  - Batman Forever (1998 TV Asahi edition) – James Gordon
  - The Quick and the Dead (1997 TV Asahi edition) – Horace
  - Batman & Robin (2000 TV Asahi edition) – James Gordon
- Philip Baker Hall
  - The Rock (1999 NTV edition) – Chief Justice
  - Boogie Nights – Floyd Gondolli
  - Rush Hour – Captain William Diel
  - The Sum of All Fears – David Becker
  - Mr. Popper's Penguins – Mr. Franklin
- Ned Beatty
  - Network (1980 TBS edition) – Arthur Jensen
  - Hostage Flight – Art Hofstadter
  - Rudy – Daniel Ruettiger Sr.
  - Just Cause (1997 TV Tokyo edition) – McNair
  - He Got Game – Warden Wyatt
- George Kennedy
  - The Dirty Dozen – Maj. Max Armbruster
  - Creepshow 2 (1989 TV Tokyo edition) – Ray Spruce
  - The Naked Gun 2½: The Smell of Fear – Captain Ed Hocken
  - Naked Gun 33 1/3: The Final Insult – Captain Ed Hocken
- The Absent-Minded Professor – Alonzo P. Hawk (Keenan Wynn)
- Alcatraz – Raymond "Ray" Archer (Robert Forster)
- Bad Girls – Frank Jarrett (Robert Loggia)
- A Better Tomorrow – Father Sung (Tien Feng)
- Bill & Ted's Bogus Journey – Rufus (George Carlin)
- The Bourne Identity – Nykwana Wombosi (Adewale Akinnuoye-Agbaje)
- Broken Embraces – Ernesto Martel (José Luis Gómez)
- Captain America – General Fleming (Darren McGavin)
- Changing Lanes – Stephen Delano (Sydney Pollack)
- Con Air (2000 TV Asahi edition) – Guard Falzon (Steve Eastin)
- Crimson Tide – Vladimir Radchenko (Daniel von Bargen)
- The Da Vinci Code – Jacques Saunière (Jean-Pierre Marielle)
- Death Wish (1980 TV Asahi edition) – Police Commissioner (Stephen Elliott)
- Deuce Bigalow: Male Gigolo – Robert Bigalow (Richard Riehle)
- Die Hard (1992 Fuji TV edition) – Joseph Yoshinobu Takagi (James Shigeta)
- Down with Love – Theodore Banner (Tony Randall)
- Dr. Dolittle 3 – Jud Jones (John Amos)
- Dr. No – M (Bernard Lee)
- The Empire Strikes Back – Admiral Ackbar
- Evilspeak (1986 TBS edition) – Sarge (R. G. Armstrong)
- The Fast and the Furious (2005 TV Asahi edition) – Bilkins (Thom Barry)
- 2 Fast 2 Furious (2006 TV Asahi edition) – Bilkins (Thom Barry)
- Firelight – Lord Clare (Joss Ackland)
- The Golden Compass – High Councilor (Christopher Lee)
- Goldfinger (2006 DVD edition) – M (Bernard Lee)
- Guilty by Suspicion – Chairman Wood (Gailard Sartain)
- Harlem Nights – Bennie Wilson (Redd Foxx)
- The Hunt for Red October – Captain 2nd Rank Viktor Tupolev (Stellan Skarsgård)
- Insomnia – Chief Charlie Nyback (Paul Dooley)
- Jungle 2 Jungle – Alexei Jovanovic (David Ogden Stiers)
- Keeping the Faith – Rabbi Ben Lewis (Eli Wallach)
- Kiss of the Dragon – Uncle Tai (Burt Kwouk)
- Lock, Stock and Two Smoking Barrels – Barry "the Baptist" (Lenny McLean)
- Marie Antoinette – Louis XV of France (Rip Torn)
- Men of Honor – Mr. Pappy (Hal Holbrook)
- Miracles – Uncle Hoi (Wu Ma)
- My Favorite Martian – Mr. Channing (Michael Lerner)
- The NeverEnding Story (1987 TV Asahi edition) – Carl Conrad Coreander (Thomas Hill)
- The New Daughter – Roger Wayne (James Gammon)
- Red – Henry Britton (Ernest Borgnine)
- Red Dawn – Jack Mason (Ben Johnson)
- Return of the Jedi – Admiral Ackbar
- Scarface (1989 TV Asahi edition) – Mel Bernstein (Harris Yulin)
- Snatch – Doug the Head (Mike Reid)
- Star Wars: The Force Awakens – Admiral Ackbar
- Superman IV: The Quest for Peace – Lex Luthor (Gene Hackman)
- Surrogates – Dr. Lionel Canter (James Cromwell)
- The Thirteenth Floor – Hannon Fuller, Grierson (Armin Mueller-Stahl)
- The Untouchables – Chief Mike Dorsett (Richard Bradford)
- Wild Wild West (2002 NTV edition) – General 'Bloodbath' McGrath (Ted Levine)
- Win Win – Leo Poplar (Burt Young)

==== Animation ====
- Atomic Betty – Admiral DeGill
- Babar – Cornelius
- The Boondocks – Robert Jebediah Freeman
- Chip 'n Dale Rescue Rangers – Monterey Jack
- Oliver & Company – Winston
- The Rescuers – Mr. Snoops
- The Secret of NIMH – The Great Owl

=== Other voices ===
- Star Tours – The Adventures Continue at Tokyo Disneyland – Admiral Ackbar
