= Studio Pierrot =

Japanese animation studio

Studio Pierrot Co., Ltd.
- Logo used since 2025

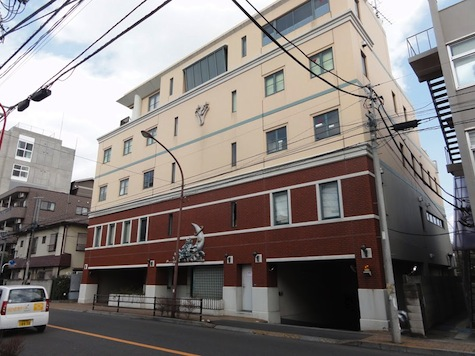
- Headquarters in Mitaka, Tokyo
- Native name: 株式会社スタジオぴえろ
- Romanized name: Kabushiki-gaisha Sutajio Piero
- Formerly: Studio Pierrot Co., Ltd. (1979–2002); Pierrot Co., Ltd. (2002–2025)
- Type: Kabushiki gaisha
- Industry: Japanese animation; Character licensing
- Predecessor: Pierrot Project (Note: Pierrot Project Co., Ltd. (株式会社ぴえろプロジェクト, Kabushiki-gaisha Piero purojekuto) was the licensing company of Studio Pierrot, handling character licensing for the studio's works. This company was founded in 1984 and was absorbed into Studio Pierrot in 2002.)
- Founded: May 1979; 47 years ago
- Founder: Yuji Nunokawa; Hisayuki Toriumi; Mitsuo Kaminashi; Masami Annou
- Headquarters: Shimorenjaku, Mitaka, Tokyo, Japan
- Area served: Worldwide
- Key people: Kazumichi Ueda (Note: President and CEO.); Kiero Itsumi (Note: President.); Michiyuki Honma (Note: Chairman.)
- Number of employees: 240 (as of April 2025)
- Divisions: Pierrot DAR (Note: Pierrot DAR (Digital Animation Room) is a division of the Japanese animation studio Pierrot that specializes in digital animation processes, including digital painting, computer-generated effects (CG), scene composition, background retouching, visual effects, and photography.); Pierrot Design Room (Note: This department specializes in 2D graphic design elements within anime productions, including title logos, typography, and other graphic components that enhance visual storytelling.); Pierrot Animation Room (Note: This division is responsible for key aspects of the animation process, such as key animation, in-between animation, and finishing touches that bring characters and scenes to life.); Pierrot Films (Note: Pierrot Films (stylized as PIERROT FILMS) is a division of the Japanese animation studio Pierrot, launched in July 2024 by veteran animation producer Yoshihiro Tominaga, with the motto "Creating animation that deeply moves the heart." The brand aims to produce high-quality animation with increased dedication and care, delivering works that resonate emotionally with audiences.)
- Subsidiaries: Studio Signpost; Pierrot China
- Website: pierrot.jp
- Footnotes; Member of the Association of Japanese Animations.

Studio Pierrot Co., Ltd. (Japanese: 株式会社スタジオぴえろ, Hepburn: Kabushiki-gaisha Sutajio Piero), known as Pierrot Co., Ltd. (Note: Japanese: 株式会社ぴえろ, Hepburn: Kabushiki-gaisha Piero) between 2002 and 2025, is a Japanese animation studio established in May 1979 by Yuji Nunokawa, Hisayuki Toriumi, Mitsuo Kaminashi and Masami Annou, previously animators for Tatsunoko Production and Mushi Production. Its headquarters are located in Mitaka, Tokyo. Pierrot is renowned for several worldwide popular anime series, such as Naruto, Bleach, Tokyo Ghoul, Creamy Mami, YuYu Hakusho, Urusei Yatsura, Fushigi Yûgi, and many others. Aside from animation production, the company also handles character licensing.

Yu Yu Hakusho and Saiyuki, two of the company's anime series, won the Animage Anime Grand Prix Award in 1994 and 1995, and 2000, respectively.

== History ==
The studio was founded in 1979 by Yuji Nunokawa, Hisayuki Toriumi, Mitsuo Kaminashi, and Masami Annou. Prior to the studio's founding, all four animators previously worked at Tatsunoko Production and Mushi Production. Nunokawa was the studio's first president and CEO, a position which he held until 2012. That year, Nunokawa retired and was elected as chairman of the board; and Michiyuki Honma, the senior managing director, succeeded him as president. Nunokawa remained with the company as chairman until his death in 2022, and two years later in July 2024, Honma retired from his position as CEO in which he was also elected to chairman. Pierrot's director of sales, Kazumichi Ueda, succeeded Honma as CEO and president. The company took on a dual representative structure and Keiro Itsumi, the company's senior managing director, was promoted as a second president to the company (with Ueda).

On April 18, 2025, the company entered into a capital and business partnership with Asahi Production.

== Productions ==
=== TV series ===
==== 1980s ====
Title	Years	Network	Director(s)	Eps.	Note(s)
The Wonderful Adventures of Nils	Jan. 1980 – Mar. 1981	NHK	Hisayuki Toriumi	52	Adaptation of the 1906 novel The Wonderful Adventures of Nils by the Swedish author Selma Lagerlöf.
Miss Machiko	Oct. 1981 – Oct. 1983	TV Tokyo	Masami Anno	95	Adaptation of the manga by Takeshi Ebihara.
Urusei Yatsura	Oct. 1981 – Mar. 1986	Fuji TV	Mamoru Oshii; Kazuo Yamazaki	194	Adaptation of the manga by Rumiko Takahashi. Episodes 1-106 only, Studio Deen took over the animation role starting with episode 107.
Esteban, Child of the Sun (The Mysterious Cities of Gold)	Jun. 1982 – Jun. 1983	NHK; Antenne 2	Hisayuki Toriumi	39	Very loosely based on the 1966 novel The King's Fifth by Scott O'Dell. Co-produced with DIC.
Mrs. Pepper Pot	Apr. 1983 – Mar. 1984	NHK	Keiji Hayakawa	130	Adaptation of children's books by Alf Prøysen. Co-produced with Studio Gallop.
Creamy Mami, the Magic Angel	Jul. 1983 – Jun. 1984	Nippon TV	Osamu Kobayashi	52	Original work.
Chikkun Takkun	Apr. 1984 – Sep. 1984	Fuji TV	Keiji Hayakawa (eps. 1–14); Masami Anno (eps. 15–23)	23	Adaptation of the manga by Shotaro Ishinomori.
Persia, the Magic Fairy	Jul. 1984 – May 1985	Nippon TV	Takashi Anno	48	Adaptation of the manga Persia ga Suki! by Takako Aonuma.
Star Musketeer Bismark	Oct. 1984 – Sep. 1985	Nippon TV	Masami Anno	51	Original work. Dubbed and rewritten in the United States by World Events Productions under the name Saber Rider and the Star Sheriffs.
Magical Emi, the Magic Star	Jun. 1985 – Feb. 1986	Nippon TV	Takashi Anno	38	Original work.
Ninja Robot Tobikage	Oct. 1985 – Jul. 1986	Nippon TV	Masami Anno	43	Original work.
Pastel Yumi, the Magic Idol	Mar. 1986 – Aug. 1987	Nippon TV	Akira Shigino	26	Original work.
Anmitsu Hime	Oct. 1986 – Sep. 1987	Fuji TV	Masami Anno	51	Adaptation of the manga by Shosuke Kurakane. A remake of the manga by Izumi Takemoto is serialized simultaneously with the anime adaptation.
Ganbare, Kickers!	Oct. 1986 – Jan. 1988	NTV	Akira Shigino	26	Adaptation of the manga by Noriaki Nagai.
Kimagure Orange Road	Apr 1987 – Mar. 1988	NTV	Osamu Kobayashi	48	Adaptation of the manga by Izumi Matsumoto.
Norakuro-kun	Oct. 1987 – Oct. 1988	Fuji TV	Masami Anno	50	Second television adaptation of the manga Norakuro by Suiho Tagawa, with the first being in 1970 by TCJ.
Osomatsu-kun	Feb. 1988 – Dec. 1989	Fuji TV	Akira Shigino	86	Second television adaptation of the manga by Fujio Akatsuka, with the first being in 1966 by Children's Corner and Studio Zero.
The Burning Wild Man	Mar. 1988 – Sep. 1988	Nippon TV	Osamu Kobayashi	24	Adaptation of the manga by Tadashi Sato.
Magical Hat	Oct. 1989 – Jul. 1990	Fuji TV	Akira Shigino	33	Adaptation of the manga by Yōji Katakura.

==== 1990s ====
Title	Years	Network	Director(s)	Eps.	Note(s)
Heisei Tensai Bakabon	Jan. 1990 – Dec. 1990	Fuji TV	Hiroshi Sasagawa	46	Third television adaptation of the manga Tensai Bakabon by Fujio Akatsuka, previously adapted twice by TMS Entertainment in 1971 and 1975 respectively, the second series being titled as Ganso Tensai Bakabon.
Musashi, the Samurai Lord	Oct. 1990 – Sep. 1991	NTV	Akira Shigino	50	Original work.
Tasuke, the Samurai Cop	Oct. 1990 – Mar. 1991	TV Tokyo	Takeshi Mori	22	Adaptation of the manga by Manavu Kashimoto.
Chokkaku, the Stubborn Samurai Boy	Jan.–Oct. 1991	Fuji TV	Masami Anno	36	Adaptation of the manga by Yu Koyama.
Little Ghosts, There, Here and Where	Apr. 1991 – Apr. 1992	NTV	Osamu Kobayashi	50	Adaptation of children's picture books by Eiko Kadono and Yoko Sasaki.
Marude Dameo	Nov. 1991 – Sep. 1992	Fuji TV	Akira Shigino	47	Adaptation of the manga by Kenji Morita.
Nontan	Oct. 1992 – Mar. 1994	Fuji TV	Akira Shigino	263	Adaptation of children's picture books by Sachiko Kiyono.
YuYu Hakusho	Oct. 1992 – Jan. 1995	Fuji TV	Noriyuki Abe	112	Adaptation of the manga by Yoshihiro Togashi.
Tottemo! Luckyman	Apr. 1994 – Mar. 1995	TV Tokyo	Osamu Nabeshima	50	Adaptation of the manga by Hiroshi Gamo
Ninku	Jan. 1995 – Feb. 1996	Fuji TV	Noriyuki Abe	55	Adaptation of the manga by Koji Kiriyama.
Fushigi Yûgi	Apr. 1995 – Mar. 1996	TV Tokyo	Hajime Kamegaki	52	Adaptation of the manga by Yuu Watase.
Midori no Makibaō	Mar. 1996 – Jul. 1997	Fuji TV	Noriyuki Abe	61	Adaptation of the manga by Tsunomaru.
Gon, the Stone-Age Boy	Apr. 1996 – Jan. 1997	NHK	Yutaka Kagawa	39	Adaptation of the manga by Shunji Sonoyama.
Baby and Me	Jul. 1996 – Mar. 1997	TV Tokyo	Takahiro Omori	35	Adaptation of the manga by Marimo Ragawa.
Hyper Police	Apr. 1997 – Sep. 1997	TV Tokyo	Takahiro Omori	25	Adaptation of the manga by Minoru Tachikawa.
Clamp School Detectives	May 1997 – Oct. 1997	TV Tokyo	Osamu Nabeshima	26	Adaptation of the manga by Clamp.
Flame of Recca	Jul. 1997 – Jul. 1998	Fuji TV	Noriyuki Abe	42	Adaptation of the manga by Nobuyuki Anzai.
Takoyaki Mantoman	Apr. 1998 – Sep. 1999	TV Tokyo	Akira Shigino	77	Adaptation of children's picture book by Hiroo Takada and Yasutoshi Nakamura.
Fancy Lala, the Magic Stage	Apr. 1998 – Sep. 1998	TV Osaka	Takahiro Omori	26	Original work.
Neo Ranga	Apr. 1998 – Sep. 1999	WOWOW	Jun Kamiya (eps 1–24) Toshiyuki Tsuru (eps 25–48)	48	Original work.
Dokkiri Doctor	Oct. 1998 – Jun. 1999	Fuji TV	Kazunori Mizuno	26	Adaptation of the manga by Fujihiko Hosono.
Yoiko	Nov. 1998 – Mar. 1999	TBS	Takahiro Omori	20	Adaptation of the manga by Yugo Ishikawa.
Microman, the Little Giant	Jan. 1999 – Dec. 1999	TV Tokyo	Noriyuki Abe	52	Adaptation of the manga by Hisashi Matsumoto.
Power Stone	Apr. 1999 – Sep. 1999	TBS	Takahiro Omori	26	Adaptation of the video game by Capcom.
I'm Gonna Be An Angel!	Apr. 1999 – Sep. 1999	TV Tokyo	Hiroshi Nishikiori	26	Original work.
Great Teacher Onizuka	Jun. 1999 – Sep. 2000	Fuji TV	Noriyuki Abe	43	Adaptation of the manga by Tooru Fujisawa.
Guru Guru Town Hanamaru-kun	Oct. 1999 – Sep. 2001	TV Osaka	Jun Kamiya	101	Original work.
Rerere no Tensai Bakabon	Oct. 1999 – Mar. 2000	TV Tokyo	Hayato Date	24	Fourth television adaptation of Tensai Bakabon following Heisei Tensai Bakabon, which was already produced by Pierrot.

==== 2000s ====
Title	Years	Network	Director(s)	Eps.	Note(s)
OH! Super Milk-chan	Jan. 2000 – Apr. 2000	WOWOW	Takahiro Omori	12	Sequel to Super Milk-chan.
Gensomaden Saiyuki	Apr. 2000 – Mar. 2001	TV Tokyo	Hayato Date	50	Based on a manga by Kazuya Minekura.
Ceres, Celestial Legend	Apr. 2000 – Sep. 2000	WOWOW	Hajime Kamegaki	24	Based on a manga by Yuu Watase.
Ghost Stories	Oct. 2000 – Mar. 2001	Fuji TV	Noriyuki Abe	20	Based on a manga by Toru Tsunametsu.
Super Gals!	Apr. 2001 – Mar. 2002	TV Tokyo	Tsuneo Kobayashi	52	Based on a manga by Mihona Fujii.
Kaze no Yojimbo	Oct. 2001 – Mar. 2002	NTV	Hayato Date	25	Based on Akira Kurosawa's film Yojimbo.
Hikaru no Go	Oct. 2001 – Mar. 2003	TV Tokyo	Susumu Nishizawa (eps 1–15) Jun Kamiya (eps 16–58); Tetsuya Endo (eps 59–75)	75	Based on a manga by Yumi Hotta and Takeshi Obata.
Kogepan	Nov. 2001	Animax	Hidekazu Ohara	10	Based on a media mix project by San-X.
Tokyo Underground	Apr. 2002 – Sep. 2002	TV Tokyo	Hayato Date	26	Based on a manga by Akinobu Uraku.
Tokyo Mew Mew	Apr. 2002 – Mar. 2003	TV Aichi	Noriyuki Abe	52	Based on a manga by Reiko Yoshida and Mia Ikumi.
The Twelve Kingdoms	Apr. 2002 – Aug. 2003	NHK	Tsuneo Kobayashi	45	Based on a light novel by Fuyumi Ono and Akihiro Yamada.
Naruto	Oct. 2002 – Feb. 2007	TV Tokyo	Hayato Date	220	Based on a manga by Masashi Kishimoto.
E's Otherwise	Apr. 2003 – Sep. 2003	TV Tokyo	Masami Shimoda	26	Based on a manga by Satoru Yuiga.
Detective School Q	Apr. 2003 – Mar. 2004	TBS	Noriyuki Abe	45	Based on a manga by Shin Kibayashi and Fumiya Satō.
Saiyuki Reload	Oct. 2003 – Mar. 2004	TV Tokyo	Tetsuya Endo	25	Based on Saiyuki manga sequel by Kazuya Minekura.
Saiyuki Reload Gunlock	Apr. 2004 – Sep. 2004	TV Tokyo	Tetsuya Endo	26	Sequel to Saiyuki Reload.
Midori Days	Apr. 2004 – Jun. 2004	TV Kanagawa	Tsuneo Kobayashi	13	Based on a manga by Kazurou Inoue.
Bleach	Oct. 2004 – Mar. 2012	TV Tokyo	Noriyuki Abe	366	Based on a manga by Tite Kubo.
Emma – A Victorian Romance	Apr. 2005 – Jun. 2005	TBS	Tsuneo Kobayashi	12	Based on a manga by Kaoru Mori.
Sugar Sugar Rune	Jul. 2005 – Jun. 2006	TV Tokyo	Yukihiro Matsushita	51	Based on a manga by Moyoco Anno.
Naruto: Shippuden	Feb. 2007 – Mar. 2017	TV Tokyo	Hayato Date (eps 1–479) Osamu Kobayashi (eps 480–483); Chiaki Kon (eps 484–488); Toshinori Watanabe (eps 489–493); Masahiko Murata (eps 494–500)	500	Sequel to Naruto.
Blue Dragon	Apr. 2007 – Mar. 2008	TV Tokyo	Yukihiro Matsushita	51	Based on a video game by Mistwalker and Artoon.
Blue Dragon: Trials of the Seven Shadows	Apr. 2008 – Mar. 2009	TV Tokyo	Yukihiro Matsushita	51	Sequel to Blue Dragon.
Hanasakeru Seishōnen	Apr. 2009 – Feb. 2010	NHK	Hajime Kamegaki	39	Based on a manga by Natsumi Itsuki.

==== 2010s ====
Title	Years	Network	Director(s)	Eps.	Note(s)
Level E	Jan. 2011 – Apr. 2011	TV Tokyo	Toshiyuki Kato	13	Based on a manga by Yoshihiro Togashi. Co-produced with David Production.
Kingdom	Jul. 2012 – Feb. 2013	NHK	Jun Kamiya	38	Based on a manga by Yasuhisa Hara.
Rock Lee & His Ninja Pals	Apr. 2012 – Mar. 2013	TV Tokyo	Masahiko Murata	51	Based on Naruto spin-off manga by Kenji Taira
Polar Bear Café	Apr. 2012 – Mar. 2013	TV Tokyo	Mitsuyuki Masuhara	50	Based on a manga by Aloha Higa.
Kingdom Season 2	Jun. 2013 – Mar. 2014	NHK	Akira Iwanaga	39	Season 2 of Kingdom.
Gaist Crusher	Oct. 2013 – Oct. 2014	TV Tokyo	Yoshihiro Takamoto	51	Based on a video game by Capcom.
The World Is Still Beautiful	Apr. 2014 – Jun. 2014	NTV	Hajime Kamegaki	12	Based on a manga by Dai Shiina.
Baby Steps	Apr. 2014 – Sep. 2014	NHK	Masahiko Murata	25	Based on a manga by Hikaru Katsuki.
Tokyo Ghoul	Jul. 2014 – Sep. 2014	Tokyo MX	Shuhei Morita	12	Based on a manga by Sui Ishida.
Yona of the Dawn	Oct. 2014 – Mar. 2015	AT-X	Kazuhiro Yoneda	24	Based on a manga by Mizuho Kusanagi.
Tokyo Ghoul √A	Jan. 2015 – Mar. 2015	Tokyo MX	Shuhei Morita	12	Season 2 of Tokyo Ghoul.
Baby Steps Season 2	Apr. 2015 – Sep. 2015	NHK	Masahiko Murata	25	Season 2 of Baby Steps.
Mr. Osomatsu (season 1)	Oct. 2015 – Mar. 2016	TV Tokyo	Yoichi Fujita	25	Based on Fujio Akatsuka's 1962 manga series, Osomatsu-kun.
Divine Gate	Jan. 2016 – Mar. 2016	Tokyo MX	Noriyuki Abe	12	Based on a smartphone game by Acquire.
Twin Star Exorcists	Apr. 2016 – Mar. 2017	TV Tokyo	Tomohisa Taguchi	50	Based on a manga by Yoshiaki Sukeno.
Puzzle & Dragons X	Jul. 2016 – Mar. 2018	TV Tokyo	Hajime Kamegaki	89	Based on a 3DS game by GungHo Online.
Tsukiuta. The Animation	Jul. 2016 – Sep. 2016	Tokyo MX	Itsuro Kawasaki	13	Based on a media mix project by Movic. (Note: Animation Production Cooperation (アニメーション制作協力) – Pierrot Plus)
Soul Buster	Oct. 2016 – Dec. 2016	Tokyo MX	Toshinori Watanabe	12	Based on a manhua by Bai Mao.
ēlDLIVE	Jan. 2017 – Mar. 2017	Tokyo MX	Joji Furuta	12	Based on a manga by Akira Amano.
Boruto: Naruto Next Generations	Apr. 2017 – Mar. 2023	TV Tokyo	Hiroyuki Yamashita (eps 1–66) Toshiro Fujii (eps 67–104); Masayuki Kouda (eps 105–281, 287–293); Noriyuki Abe (eps 282–286)	293	Based on Naruto manga sequel, Boruto, by Masashi Kishimoto and Mikio Ikemoto.
Convenience Store Boy Friends	Jul. 2017 – Sep. 2017	TBS	Hayato Date	12	Based on a media mix project by Kadokawa.
Black Clover (season 1)	Oct. 2017 – Mar. 2021	TV Tokyo	Tatsuya Yoshihara (#1-152); Ayataka Tanemura (#153-170)	170	Based on a manga by Yuki Tabata.
Mr. Osomatsu (season 2)	Oct. 2017 – Mar. 2018	TV Tokyo	Yoichi Fujita	25	Season 2 of Mr. Osomatsu
Dynamic Chord	Oct. 2017 – Dec. 2017	TBS	Shigenori Kageyama	12	Based on a visual novel by Honeybee Black.
Sanrio Boys	Jan. 2018 – Mar. 2018	Tokyo MX	Masashi Kudo	12	Based on a media mix project by Sanrio.
Puzzle & Dragons	Apr. 2018 – present	TV Tokyo	Hajime Kamegaki	TBA	Based on a smartphone game by GungHo Online.
Tokyo Ghoul:re (part 1)	Apr. 2018 – Jun. 2018	Tokyo MX	Toshinori Watanabe	12	Based on Tokyo Ghoul manga sequel by Sui Ishida.
Tokyo Ghoul:re (part 2)	Oct. 2018 – Dec. 2018	Tokyo MX	Toshinori Watanabe	12	Part 2 of Tokyo Ghoul:re.

==== 2020s ====
Title	Years	Network	Director	Eps.	Studio	Note(s)
Kingdom Season 3	Apr. 2020 – Oct. 2021	NHK	Kenichi Imaizumi	26	Studio Pierrot	Season 3 of Kingdom. Co-produced with Studio Signpost.
Akudama Drive	Oct. 2020 – Dec. 2020	AT-X	Tomohisa Taguchi	12	Studio Pierrot	Original work. Co-produced with Too Kyo Games.
Mr. Osomatsu (season 3)	Oct. 2020 – Mar. 2021	TV Tokyo	Yoichi Fujita	25	Studio Pierrot	Season 3 of Mr. Osomatsu.
Kingdom Season 4	Apr. 2022 – Oct. 2022	NHK	Kenichi Imaizumi	26	Studio Pierrot	Season 4 of Kingdom. Co-produced with Studio Signpost.
Bleach: Thousand-Year Blood War (part 1)	Oct. 2022 – Dec. 2022	TV Tokyo	Tomohisa Taguchi	13	Studio Pierrot	Sequel to Bleach.
Play It Cool, Guys	Oct. 2022 – Mar. 2023	TV Tokyo	Chiaki Kon	24	Studio Pierrot	Based on a manga by Kokone Nata.
Bleach: Thousand-Year Blood War (part 2)	Jul. 2023 – Sep. 2023	TV Tokyo	Tomohisa Taguchi	13	Studio Pierrot	Part 2 of Bleach: Thousand-Year Blood War.
Kingdom Season 5	Jan. 2024 – Mar. 2024	NHK	Kenichi Imaizumi	13	Studio Pierrot	Season 5 of Kingdom. Co-produced with Studio Signpost.
Yatagarasu: The Raven Does Not Choose Its Master	Apr. 2024 – Sep. 2024	NHK	Yoshiaki Kyōgoku	20	Studio Pierrot	Based on a novel by Chisato Abe.
Bleach: Thousand-Year Blood War (part 3)	Oct. 2024 – Dec. 2024	TV Tokyo	Hikaru Murata	14	Pierrot Films	Part 3 of Bleach: Thousand-Year Blood War.
Mr. Osomatsu (season 4)	Jul. 2025 – Oct. 2025	TV Tokyo	Yoshinori Odaka	12	Pierrot Films	Season 4 of Mr. Osomatsu.
Kingdom Season 6	Oct. 2025 – Dec. 2025	NHK	Kenichi Imaizumi	13	Studio Pierrot	Season 6 of Kingdom. Co-produced with Studio Signpost.
Magical Sisters LuluttoLilly	Apr. 2026 – present	Tokyo MX	Shintarō Dōge	TBA	Studio Pierrot	Original work.
Bleach: Thousand-Year Blood War (part 4)	Jul. 2026 – Oct. 2026	TV Tokyo	Hikaru Murata	10	Pierrot Films	Part 4 of Bleach: Thousand-Year Blood War.
Black Clover (season 2)	Oct. 2026 – present	TV Tokyo	Ayataka Tanemura	TBA	Studio Pierrot	Season 2 of Black Clover.
Charisma	Jan. 2027 – scheduled	TBS	Jōji Furuta	TBA	Pierrot Films	Based on a 2.5D mixed-media project.
Yona of the Dawn (sequel)	TBA	TBA	TBA	TBA	Pierrot Films	Sequel to Yona of the Dawn.

=== Anime films ===
Year	Title	Director	Dur.
1983	Urusei Yatsura: Only You	Mamoru Oshii	89 m
1984	Urusei Yatsura 2: Beautiful Dreamer	Mamoru Oshii	97 m
1987	Lullaby for Wednesday's Cinderella	Motosuke Takahashi	52 m
1987	Bari Bari Densetsu	Osamu Uemura	84 m
1988	Kimagure Orange Road: I Want to Return to That Day	Tomomi Mochizuki	69 m
1989	Osomatsu-kun: Greetings from the Watermelon Planet!	Akira Shigino	24 m
1990	Maroko	Mamoru Oshii	90 m
1991	The Earring of Moonlight	Takeshi Mori	70 m
1993	Yu Yu Hakusho: The Movie	Noriyuki Abe	25 m
1994	Yu Yu Hakusho: Poltergeist Report	Masakatsu Iijima	93 m
1994	Ninku: Tomb of Knives	Noriyuki Abe	34 m
1995	Ninku: The Movie	Noriyuki Abe	25 m
1996	Kimagure Orange Road: Summer's Beginning	Kunihiko Yuyama	95 m
1999	Daigekisen! Microman vs. Saikyou Senshi Gorgon	Noriyuki Abe	30 m
2001	Saiyuki: Requiem	Hayato Date	95 m
2003	Ryoukan-san	Masami Anno	70 m
2004	Naruto the Movie: Ninja Clash in the Land of Snow	Tensai Okamura	83 m
2005	Naruto the Movie: Legend of the Stone of Gelel	Hirotsugu Kawasaki	97 m
2006	Naruto the Movie: Guardians of the Crescent Moon Kingdom	Toshiyuki Tsuru	95 m
2006	Bleach: Memories of Nobody	Noriyuki Abe	93 m
2007	Naruto Shippuden the Movie	Hajime Kamegaki	95 m
2007	Bleach: The DiamondDust Rebellion	Noriyuki Abe	92 m
2008	Naruto Shippuden the Movie: Bonds	Hajime Kamegaki	93 m
2008	Bleach: Fade to Black	Noriyuki Abe	94 m
2009	Naruto Shippuden the Movie: The Will of Fire	Masahiko Murata	95 m
2010	Naruto Shippuden the Movie: The Lost Tower	Masahiko Murata	99 m
2010	Bleach: Hell Verse	Noriyuki Abe	94 m
2011	Legend of the Millennium Dragon	Hirotsugu Kawasaki	98 m
2011	Naruto the Movie: Blood Prison	Masahiko Murata	94 m
2012	Road to Ninja: Naruto the Movie	Hayato Date	110 m
2014	The Last: Naruto the Movie	Tsuneo Kobayashi	114 m
2015	Boruto: Naruto the Movie	Hiroyuki Yamashita	96 m
2019	Mr. Osomatsu: The Movie	Yoichi Fujita	108 m
2022	Mr. Osomatsu: The Hipipo Tribe and the Glistening Fruit	Yoshinori Odaka	75 m
2023	Black Clover: Sword of the Wizard King	Ayataka Tanemura	113 m
2023	Mr. Osomatsu: The Soul's Takoyaki Party and the Legendary Sleepover Party	Hikaru Yamaguchi	59 m

=== OVAs and specials ===
Note: This may not be a complete list.

- Dallos (December 16, 1983 – August 5, 1984) — 4 episodes
- Area 88 (February 5, 1985 – August 15, 1986) — 3 episodes (2 international)
- Cosmo Police Justy (July 20, 1985)
- Creamy Mami, the Magic Angel: Eien no Once More (1984)
- Creamy Mami, the Magic Angel: Lovely Serenade (1985)
- Creamy Mami, the Magic Angel: Long Goodbye (1985)
- Kimagure Orange Road: Shonen Jump Special (November 23, 1985) — Short film
- Fire Tripper (December 16, 1985)
- Creamy Mami, the Magic Angel Song Special 2: Curtain Call (1986)
- Maris the Chojo (May 21, 1986)
- Magical Emi, the Magic Star: Finale! Finale! (1986)
- Bari Bari Densetsu (May 10, 1986 – December 16, 1986) — 2 episodes
- Magical Emi, the Magic Star: Semishigure (1986)
- Laughing Target (March 21, 1987)
- Lily C.A.T. (September 1, 1987)
- Persia, the Magic Fairy: Merry-go-Round (1987)
- Salamander (February 25, 1988 – February 21, 1989) — 3 episodes
- Harbor Light Story Fashion Lala Yori (March 11, 1988)
- Baoh (November 1, 1989)
- Gosenzo-sama Banbanzai! (August 5, 1989 – January 25, 1990) — 6 episodes
- Like the Clouds, Like the Wind (March 21, 1990) — Television film
- Shougakusei no Yuukai Boushi: Yumi-chan Abunai yo! (May 21, 1991) — Educational Film
- Beyond the Tide of Time (June 16, 1991) — Television film
- The Abashiri Family (May 21, 1991 – November 21, 1991) — 4 episodes
- The Heroic Legend of Arslan (August 17, 1991 – September 21, 1995, episodes 3–4, co-animated with Daume) — 6 episodes
- Here Is Greenwood (November 22, 1991 – March 26, 1993) — 6 episodes
- Eternal Filena (December 21, 1992 – February 25, 1993) — 6 episodes
- Kyō Kara Ore Wa!! (April 1, 1993 – December 21, 1996) — 10 episodes
- Yu Yu Hakusho: Eizo Hakusho (September 21, 1994 – February 7, 1996) — 6 episodes
- Plastic Little: The Adventures of Captain Tita (March 21, 1994)
- Key the Metal Idol (December 16, 1994 – August 7, 1996) — 13 episodes
- Street Fighter II: Return to the Fujiwara Capital (March 29, 1995) (animation)
- Sonic the Hedgehog (1996)
- My Dear Marie (1996) — 3 episodes
- Hunter x Hunter Pilot (1998)
- Tokimeki Memorial: Forever With You (1999) — 2 episodes
- Tenamonya Voyagers (1999) — 4 episodes
- Fushigi Yuugi: Eikouden (2001–2002) — 4 episodes
- Hikaru no Go Special, Match of Justice! The Ancient Flower Blooms!! (2002)
- Gensoumaden Saiyuuki: Kibou no Zaika (2002)
- I"s (2002–2003) — 2 episodes
- I"s Pure (2002–2003, with ARMS) — 6 episodes
- Hikaru no Go: Memories (2004)
- Bleach: Memories in the Rain (2004)
- Gakkou no Kaidan (2005–2009) — 10 episodes
- Naruto: Finally a Clash!! Jounin vs. Genin! (2005)
- Bleach: The Sealed Sword Frenzy (2006)
- Saiyuki Reload: Burial (2007–2008) — 3 episodes
- Tamala 2010: A Punk Cat in Space (2007)
- Naruto x UT (2011)
- Green Lantern: Emerald Knights (2013)
- Yona of the Dawn (2015) — 3 episodes
- Tokyo Ghoul [JACK](2015)
- Tokyo Ghoul [PINTO](2015)
- The Day Naruto Became Hokage (2016)
- Road of Naruto (2022)

=== ONAs ===
Year	Title	Director	Eps.	Note(s)
2018	Hero Mask	Hiroyasu Aoki	15	Original work. Released on Netflix.
2019	Hero Mask Season 2	Hiroyasu Aoki	9	Season 2 of Hero Mask. Released on Netflix.
2021	Mr. Osomatsu: Valentine's Day Shorts	Yoichi Fujita	3	Short series of Mr. Osomatsu. Released on dTV.
2021	Mr. Osomatsu: White Day Shorts	Yoichi Fujita	3	Short series of Mr. Osomatsu. Released on dTV.
2024	WcDonald's		4	In collaboration with McDonald's

=== Video games ===
Note: This may not be a complete list.

Title	Years	Publisher	Notes
Keio Flying Squadron	1993	JVC Musical Industries	Animated cutscenes
TIZ: Tokyo Insect Zoo	1996	General Entertainment	Animated cutscenes
Keio Flying Squadron 2	1996	JVC Musical Industries	Animated cutscenes
Rami-chan no Ōedo Sugoroku: Keiō Yūgekitai Gaiden	1998	Victor Interactive Software	Animated cutscenes
Yu Yu Hakusho: Dark Tournament	2004	Digital Fiction	Animated cutscenes
Flame of Recca: Final Burning	2004	Konami	Animated cutscenes
Battle Stadium D.O.N	2005	Bandai Namco Games	Animated cutscenes
Bleach: Soul Resurrección	2011	Sony Interactive Entertainment	Animated cutscenes
Naruto Shippuden: Ultimate Ninja Storm Generations	2012	Bandai Namco Games	Animated cutscenes

=== Outsourced Western animation ===
Title	Years	Network	Notes
Green Lantern: Emerald Knights	Jun. 2011	Warner Home Video	Co-animated with Studio 4°C and JM Animation
The Legend of Korra	Apr. 2012 – Dec. 2014	Nickelodeon	Eps. 13–18, 21
