= Tokyo Ghoul season 1 =

Tokyo Ghoul
- Season 1
- No. of episodes: 12

Release
- Original network: Tokyo MX, TVO, TVA, TVQ, BS Dlife, CS AT-X
- Original release: July 4 – September 19, 2014

Season chronology
- Next → Tokyo Ghoul √A

The first season of the Tokyo Ghoul anime television series is adapted from Sui Ishida's manga series of the same name. The anime is produced by Pierrot and directed by Shuhei Morita. The season aired from July to September 2014 on Tokyo MX, TVO, TVA, TVQ, BS Dlife and AT-X. The season adapts the first 66 chapters of the manga.

The series follows Ken Kaneki, a seventeen-year-old college student who survives an encounter with the binge-eating ghoul Rize Kamishiro, after having her organs transplanted into him. As a result, Ken became a half-ghoul, half-human hybrid, who learns the ghoul lifestyle after working at the ghoul-run cafe "Anteiku." Later he is captured by a dangerous ghoul, named Jason, due to the similarities he shares with Rize.

The score is composed by Yutaka Yamada. The opening theme for the series is "Unravel" by TK from Ling Tosite Sigure, and the ending theme is "The Saints" (聖者たち, Seijatachi) by People In The Box.

The anime series was released in Japan by TC Entertainment, with Marvelous handling the promotion of the series. TC Entertainment released the series onto four volumes, with the first volume being released on September 26, 2014, and the fourth volume being released on December 26, 2014. A complete set containing all twelve episodes was released on June 29, 2016.

In English speaking regions, the anime series is licensed by Crunchyroll in North America, Madman Entertainment in Australia and New Zealand, and Anime Limited in the United Kingdom and Ireland. Funimation simulcasted the series on their website, produced an English dub, and released the series on home media on September 22, 2015. Madman Entertainment simulcasted the series on AnimeLab, and released the series on November 18, 2015. Anime Limited simulcasted the series on Wakamin, and released the series on September 28, 2015. The season ran on Adult Swim's Toonami programming block in the United States from March to June 2017.

== Episodes ==
| No. overall | No. in season | Title (Note: English translated titles are taken from Crunchyroll.) | Directed by (Note: Information is taken from the ending credits of each episode.) | Storyboarded by | Original release date | English air date |
|---|---|---|---|---|---|---|
| 1 | 1 | "Tragedy"; Transliteration: "Higeki" (Japanese: 悲劇) | Shuhei Morita | Shuhei Morita | July 4, 2014 | March 26, 2017 |
Ken Kaneki is a boy who befriends the beautiful and enigmatic Rize Kamishiro, unaware that she is a ghoul. Rize reveals her intentions to eat Kaneki but by a stroke of luck Kaneki survives her attack but is mortally wounded. He is saved by an emergency operation, performed by Dr. Akihiro Kanou, transferring Rize's organs into himself. This subsequently turns him into a half-ghoul half-human hybrid and Kaneki struggles to survive and cope by himself.
| 2 | 2 | "Incubation"; Transliteration: "Fuka" (Japanese: 孵化) | Shin Matsuo | Shin Matsuo | July 11, 2014 | April 2, 2017 |
Kaneki struggles to adapt to his new nature with no success, until another ghoul, Nishiki Nishio, attempts to prey on his friend, Hideyoshi Nagachika, and he must fight to protect him.
| 3 | 3 | "Dove"; Transliteration: "Shirohato" (Japanese: 白鳩) | Sōichi Shimada | Sōichi Shimada | July 18, 2014 | April 9, 2017 |
After saving his friend, Kaneki is taken in by Yoshimura, a ghoul who runs the Cafe "Anteiku", who teaches him to blend in human society while hiding his true nature. However, he gets bullied by another ghoul named Touka Kirishima.
| 4 | 4 | "Supper"; Transliteration: "Bansan" (Japanese: 晩餐) | Tadahito Matsubayashi | Tadahito Matsubayashi | July 25, 2014 | April 23, 2017 (Note: Due to special scheduling, Tokyo Ghoul did not air on the night of April 15–16, 2017.) |
A ghoul named Tsukiyama approaches Kaneki with unknown intentions and the two start hanging out. However, Tsukiyama has prepared a mortal trap where Kaneki is to be killed and eaten. Kaneki finds himself in an arena facing a giant ghoul executioner, Taro, but Tsukiyama intervenes and kills Taro as he wants Kaneki for himself.
| 5 | 5 | "Scars"; Transliteration: "Zankon" (Japanese: 残痕) | Yoshiaki Kyougoku | Yoshiaki Kyougoku | August 1, 2014 | April 30, 2017 |
Intending to consume Kaneki himself, Tsukiyama prepares another trap, using Nishio's human girlfriend Nishino Kimi as a hostage. Kaneki confronts Tsukiyama and is assisted by Nishio and then Touka. They are no match for Tsukiyama as their kagune are not as strong because they do not consume human flesh, so Touka bites Kaneki, restoring her kagune.
| 6 | 6 | "Cloudburst"; Transliteration: "Shūu" (Japanese: 驟雨) | Sōichi Shimada | Sōichi Shimada | August 8, 2014 | May 7, 2017 |
Tsukiyama is defeated by Touka with Nishio's help. Meanwhile, recent developments in the 20th ward draw the attention of the Commission of Counter Ghoul (CCG), who sends two of their investigators, Kureo Mado & Kōtarō Amon to hunt down all ghouls in the area. They find Hinami's father, Fueguchi and kill him. They then use some of Fueguchi's blood to attract ghouls and trap Hinami and her mother, Ryouko.
| 7 | 7 | "Captivity"; Transliteration: "Yūshū" (Japanese: 幽囚) | Tadahito Matsubayashi | Tadahito Matsubayashi | August 15, 2014 | May 14, 2017 |
Hinami's mother Ryouko is killed by Mado. An angry and vengeful Touka attacks members of the CCG. She kills Kusaba and attacks Amon, but Mado intervenes, using his kagune-like quinque and wounds Touka. Kaneki tells Touka that he wants to fight the ghoul investigators, much to Touka's chagrin, and is given his mask by Uta.
| 8 | 8 | "Circular"; Transliteration: "Enkan" (Japanese: 円環) | Shin Matsuo | Shin Matsuo | August 22, 2014 | May 21, 2017 |
Mado lures Hinami into a trap, but she is followed by Kaneki and Touka. Touka attacks Mado while Kaneki confronts Amon. During the fight with Amon, Kaneki realizes that he's the only one that understands the plight of both humans and ghouls. Kaneki bites Amon, releasing his kagune, but then tells Amon to escape, to his surprise. Meanwhile as Mado fights Touka, he reveals that the quinque used by the CCG are made from the kagune of dead ghouls. Hinami eventually uses her kagune to save Touka fatally wounding Mado, but refusing to kill him.
| 9 | 9 | "Birdcage"; Transliteration: "Torikago" (Japanese: 鳥籠) | Yoshiaki Kyougoku | Yoshiaki Kyougoku | August 29, 2014 | June 4, 2017 (Note: Adult Swim showed a Samurai Jack marathon on May 27–28, 2017.) |
Amon recalls his early days in the CCG when he was partnered with the experienced Mado. Meanwhile, Touka looks after Hinami above the cafe. Still mourning the loss of his partner, Amon is relocated to the 11th ward, where the CCG have trouble facing dangerous ghouls who do not fear them.
| 10 | 10 | "Aogiri" (Japanese: 青桐) | Tadahito Matsubayashi | Tadahito Matsubayashi | September 5, 2014 | June 11, 2017 |
In the 11th ward, Aogiri Tree ghouls attack a CCG branch and kill all the investigators, to the concern of Yoshimura and Yomo. Banjou Kazuichi from the 11th Ward comes to the cafe looking for Rize, then Touka's brother Ayato arrives, and then Yamori (Jason) who brutally beats and then kidnaps Kaneki. While the CCG plan an attack on the Aogiri Tree, Touka, Nishio and Hinami prepare to rescue Kaneki with the aid of an unlikely ally: Tsukiyama.
| 11 | 11 | "High Spirits"; Transliteration: "Shōten" (Japanese: 衝天) | Shin Matsuo | Shin Matsuo | September 12, 2014 | June 18, 2017 |
As Kaneki is tortured mercilessly by Yamori, the CCG storm the Aogiri Tree hideout. Meanwhile the Anteiku group infiltrate the building to rescue Kaneki. The CCG gain the upper hand, but are then confronted by the One-Eyed Owl, the leader of Aogiri Tree.
| 12 | 12 | "Ghoul"; Transliteration: "Kushu" (Japanese: 喰種) | Shuhei Morita | Shuhei Morita | September 19, 2014 | June 25, 2017 |
During the physical and mental tortures he suffers at the hands of Jason, who reveals to him that Dr. Kanou turned him into a ghoul on purpose, Kaneki's hair turns white and he sees a vision of Rize. After a lengthy dialogue and analysation of his past with her, comes to accept his ghoul-half and breaks free of his chains. Kaneki fights back and mortally wounding Yamori before devouring his kagune.

== Home media release ==
=== Japanese ===
TC Entertainment (Japan – Region 2/A)
| Vol. | Episodes | Blu-ray / DVD artwork | Release date | Ref. |
|---|---|---|---|---|
| 1 | 1–3 | Ken Kaneki | September 26, 2014 | |
| 2 | 4–6 | Tōka Kirishima | October 31, 2014 | |
| 3 | 7–9 | Shū Tsukiyama | November 28, 2014 | |
| 4 | 10–12 | Ken Kaneki | December 26, 2014 | |

=== English ===
Crunchyroll LLC (North America – Region 1/A)
| Vol. | Episodes | Release date | Ref. |
|---|---|---|---|
| 1 | 1–12 | September 22, 2015 | |
| Classics | 1–12 | September 11, 2018 | |

Madman Entertainment (Australia and New Zealand – Region 4/B)
| Vol. | Episodes | Release date | Ref. |
|---|---|---|---|
| 1 | 1–12 | November 18, 2015 | |

Anime Limited (United Kingdom and Ireland – Region 2/B)
| Vol. | Episodes | Release date | Ref. |
|---|---|---|---|
| 1 | 1–12 | September 28, 2015 | |
| Collection | 1–12, √A 1–12, Jack and Pinto | December 3, 2018 | |
