= Tokyo Ghoul √A =

- Season 2
- No. of episodes: 12

Release
- Original network: Tokyo MX, TVO, TVA, TVQ, BS Dlife
- Original release: January 9 – March 27, 2015

Season chronology
- ← Previous; Tokyo Ghoul Next → Tokyo Ghoul:re

The second season of the Tokyo Ghoul anime television series, titled Tokyo Ghoul √A, (Note: Spoken as "Root A") is produced by Pierrot, and directed by Shuhei Morita. The season aired from January to March 2015 on Tokyo MX, TVO, TVA, TVQ, MRO, BS Dlife and AT-X.

The season roughly adapts the second half of the Tokyo Ghoul manga, although, √A does not directly adapt everything from the manga. Rather, it mixes in the manga's content with an anime original story composition credited towards the author Sui Ishida. The season follows Ken Kaneki after he joins Aogiri Tree, as the group begins their battle against the CCG, who are trying to exterminate the ghoul organization.

The music is composed by Yutaka Yamada, who also produced the score for the first season. The opening theme for the season is "Munou" (無能, Munō; transl. "Incompetence") by österreich, and the ending theme is "Kisetsu wa Tsugitsugi Shinde Iku" (季節は次々死んでいく; transl. "The Seasons Die Out, One After Another") by amazarashi.

TC Entertainment released the series in Japan onto six volumes from March 27 to August 28, 2015. A complete set containing all twelve episodes was later released on September 30, 2016.

The series is licensed by Crunchyroll, which produced an English dub as it aired, and released the series on home video on May 24, 2016. Madman Entertainment licensed the series in Australia and New Zealand, simulcasted the series on AnimeLab, and released the series on home video on July 6, 2016. Anime Limited licensed the series in the United Kingdom and Ireland, who simulcasted the series on Wakamin, and released the series on home video on June 13, 2016. The season ran on Adult Swim's Toonami programming block in the United States from July to October 2017.

== Episodes ==
No. overall	No. in season	Title (Note: English translated titles are taken from Crunchyroll.)	Directed by (Note: Information is taken from the ending credits of each episode.)	Storyboarded by	Original release date	English air date
13	1	"New Surge"; Transliteration: "Shinkō" (Japanese: 新洸)	Shin Matsuo	Shin Matsuo	January 9, 2015	July 9, 2017
An all-out battle takes place between the CCG and the Aogiri led by the One-Eyed Owl. Shinohara and Iwa take on the One-Eyed Owl using new quinque armour called aratas, but are unable to defeat him. As the building collapses, the CCG lose about half of their troops and suspect that it was a trap. Meanwhile, Touka fights her brother Ayato but she is badly injured and saved by Kaneki. To her surprise, Kaneki leaves the Anteiku group to join the Aogiri Tree.
14	2	"Dancing Flowers"; Transliteration: "Buka" (Japanese: 舞花)	Tadahito Matsubayashi	Tadahito Matsubayashi	January 16, 2015	July 16, 2017
The 9th and 10th wards are lost to the Aogiri, apparently led by a ghoul with an eyepatch. Meanwhile Mado's daughter Akira, is assigned to become Amon's new partner. Touka decided to go Kaami University. Akira suggests that a ghoul organization is in control of the 20th ward, but also causes some friction among the investigators because of her abrupt manner. Now the coffee shop is reopened. Kaneki has now joined the Aogiri.
15	3	"Hangman"; Transliteration: "Tsurushibito" (Japanese: 吊人)	Yoshiaki Kyougoku	Yoshiaki Kyougoku	January 23, 2015	July 23, 2017
Kaneki and Ayato lead an Aogiri attack on a CCG convoy to rescue Naki, one of Jason's old cohorts who is being taken to the maximum security prison for ghouls known as Cochlea. During the mission, they are attacked by two one-eyed ghouls in black and white striped masks. Touka pays a visit to the university which Kaneki used to attend, where she has an encounter with Hideyoshi Nagachika (Hide) who is now working as a messenger for the CCG.
16	4	"Deeper Layers"; Transliteration: "Shinsō" (Japanese: 深層)	Yoriyasu Kogawa	Yoriyasu Kogawa	January 30, 2015	July 30, 2017
While Amon and Akira visit Cochlea prison to learn more about Aogiri's plan from Donato Porpora, the Aogiri commence their invasion of Cochlea and free a majority of the imprisoned ghouls. The two one-eyed ghouls, Kurona and Nashiro Yasuhisa, meet up with the idiosyncratic inspector Juzo Suzuya. Kaneki frees the powerful ghoul Matasaka Kamishiro, commonly known as Sachi, a ghoul who had a personal relationship with Rize. However, Kaneki is attacked by him and badly beaten. Eto arrives and greets Shachi, asking if he would like to see Rize. Meanwhile, a worn out Kaneki begins devouring ghoul corpses in desperation.
17	5	"Rift"; Transliteration: "Sakeme" (Japanese: 裂目)	Yoshifumi Sueda	Yoshifumi Sueda	February 6, 2015	August 6, 2017
The battle at Cochlea intensifies on several fronts. Juzo defeats Kurona and Nashiro Yasuhisa, and Shinohara in his arata armour almost kills Ayato. Kaneki undergoes a transformation, generating an additional kagune after consuming dead ghouls, however he is beaten by Amon. Amon recalls the time Kaneki spared him and so he hesitates, reluctant to kill Kaneki. At that moment, the One-Eyed-Owl arrives, grabs Ayato and Kaneki, then departs.
18	6	"Thousand Paths"; Transliteration: "Senro" (Japanese: 千路)	Tadahito Matsubayashi	Tadahito Matsubayashi	February 13, 2015	August 13, 2017
Juzo recalls the time when he was known as Rei, an arena executioner for the ghoul Big Madam, and then his acceptance into the CCG by Shinohara. Amon and Akira spend some time together and develop a better understanding of each other. Meanwhile the CCG prepare a task force to combat the One-Eyed-Owl and the Aogiri. Kaneki painfully tries to gain control his new kagune.
19	7	"Permeation"; Transliteration: "Tōka" (Japanese: 透過)	Sōichi Shimada	Sōichi Shimada	February 20, 2015	August 20, 2017
Hinami misses Kaneki but is uncertain what to do about it. Tsukiyama, who has been working as Yoshimura's spy to gather information on Kaneki, takes Hinami out to a cafe to cheer her up. Sen Takatsuki, Kaneki's and Hinami's favourite author, shows up at the cafe and tells Hinami that in her current state, she cannot help her Onii-chan (Kaneki). Takatsuki visits the CCG, and tells Shinohara about Anteiku so he pays a visit with Juzo and meets Yoshimura. Later, Kaneki appears at Anteiku and although Touka rushes there to see him, she beats him up instead of revealing her true feelings for him.
20	8	"Old Nines"; Transliteration: "Kyūkyū" (Japanese: 旧九)	Yoriyasu Kogawa	Yoriyasu Kogawa	February 27, 2015	August 27, 2017
Yoshimura tells Kaneki about his early life as the killer Kuzen, who worked for an organization known as V, and that the One-Eyed-Owl is actually his child, Eto, with a human woman, Ukina. When V found out about his family they killed Ukina while Kuzen and baby Eto escaped. Yoshimura then sends Touka and Hinami to safety with Yomo, suspecting that the CCG has discovered the truth about Anteiku and is planning an attack. Indeed, CCG's chairman Tsuneyoshi Washuu authorizes an attack on Anteiku in order to kill the Owl.
21	9	"City In Waiting"; Transliteration: "Gaibō" (Japanese: 街望)	Yoshiaki Kyougoku	Yoshiaki Kyougoku	March 6, 2015	September 10, 2017 (Note: Adult Swim showed a Dragon Ball Z Kai marathon on September 2–3, 2017.)
The CCG staff prepare their testamentary notes in their own personal ways in preparation for a potentially fatal full scale assault on Anteiku. They launch the attack using conventional and specialized weapons and are greeted by the Devil Apes and Black Dober groups with Yoshimura and his friends - Yoshimura pretending to be the One-Eyed Owl. Despite being warned of the danger, Touka and Kaneki head to the 20th ward to assist their friends.
22	10	"Last Rain"; Transliteration: "Shūu" (Japanese: 終雨)	Shin Matsuo	Shin Matsuo	March 13, 2015	September 17, 2017
Kaneki's friends from Anteiku are defeated one by one but he arrives to help them. Juzo, Shinohara and a few other investigators finally defeat Yoshimura after a long, fierce battle. Amon faces off against Kaneki, but with victory in sight for the CCG, the real One-Eyed Owl appears before the investigators.
23	11	"Deluge of Flowers"; Transliteration: "Itsuka" (Japanese: 溢花)	Sōichi Shimada	Sōichi Shimada	March 20, 2015	September 24, 2017
The One-Eyed Owl easily defeats Shinohara and Juzo, and when the Aogiri Tree joins the battle, the CCG is driven into a corner. Kaneki and Amon face off, and reluctantly engage in battle. Eventually the strongest investigator, Kishō Arima attacks the One-Eyed Owl giving the CCG renewed hope to fight. Badly wounded, the One-Eyed Owl consumes Yoshimura's body and escapes. Also wounded, Kaneki struggles towards Anteiku. He wakes up in the cafe and finds Hide trying to make coffee for him. In a post-credits scene, the Owl regurgitates a still alive Yoshimura and goes back to her original form, revealing herself to be both Sen Takatsuki and the Owl/Eto.
24	12	"Ken" (Japanese: 研)	Shuhei Morita	Shuhei Morita	March 27, 2015	October 1, 2017
Kaneki thinks back to happier times in Anteiku. Hide reveals that he knew Kaneki was a ghoul after Nishiki attacked the two of them. Hide collapses from blood loss and passes out in Kaneki's arms, having been mortally wounded on the battlefield. Touka chases after Kaneki when she sees him walking out of the burning Anteiku but is stopped by Yomo, who states that Yoshimura's last request was for him to protect her. Kaneki walks toward the CCG, carrying Hide's body in his arms, and faces Arima to battle. The next morning, Kaneki, Hide and Amon have vanished along with the other CCG members, leaving only an unharmed Arima, most likely having won against Kaneki, leaving Kaneki's fate unknown. After the credits, it is shown that Touka has opened up a new café.

== Home media release ==
=== Japanese ===
TC Entertainment (Japan – Region 2/A)
Vol.	Episodes	Blu-ray / DVD artwork	Release date	Ref.
1	1–2	Ken Kaneki	March 27, 2015	
2	3–4	Shū Tsukiyama, Naki	April 24, 2015	
3	5–6	Suzuya Jūzō, Yukinori Shinohara	May 29, 2015	
4	7–8	Akira Mado, Kōtarō Amon	June 26, 2015	
5	9–10	Tōka Kirishima, Hinami Fueguchi	July 31, 2015	
6	11–12	Ken Kaneki, Hideyoshi Nagachika	August 28, 2015	

=== English ===
Crunchyroll LLC (North America – Region 1/A)
Vol.	Episodes	Release date	Ref.
1	1–12	May 24, 2016	

Madman Entertainment (Australia and New Zealand – Region 4/B)
Vol.	Episodes	Release date	Ref.
1	1–12	July 6, 2016	

Anime Limited (United Kingdom and Ireland – Region 2/B)
Vol.	Episodes	Release date	Ref.
1	1–12	June 13, 2016	
