= Tokyo Ghoul:re (TV series) =

- Season 3
- No. of episodes: 24

Release
- Original network: Tokyo MX, SUN, TVA, TVQ, BS11
- Original release: April 3 – December 25, 2018

Season chronology
- ← Previous; Tokyo Ghoul √A

Tokyo Ghoul:re is the third and final season of the Tokyo Ghoul anime television series which is based on Sui Ishida's sequel manga series of the same name. The anime is produced by Pierrot and directed by Toshinori Watanabe. Tokyo Ghoul:re aired from April to December 2018 on Tokyo MX, SUN, TVA, TVQ and BS11. Notably, Tokyo Ghoul:re follows the manga's continuity, effectively disregarding the events introduced in the previous season, Tokyo Ghoul √A, (Note: Spoken as "Root A") for it diverged significantly from the manga, incorporating an anime-original storyline that was not part of Sui Ishida's original work. As a result, Tokyo Ghoul:re does not reconcile or reference most of the unique plotlines from √A, instead aligning closely with the narrative established in the manga.

Set two years after the ending of the original series, it follows the story of Haise Sasaki, Ken Kaneki's new identity, who is a member of the CCG and the leader of the Quinx Squad, a group of half-ghoul, half-human hybrids who use their ability to attack and defeat ghouls.

Yutaka Yamada returns as the composer for the score. For the first part, the opening theme for the is "Asphyxia" by Cö shu Nie, and the ending theme is "Half" by Queen Bee. For the second part, the opening theme is "katharsis" by TK from Ling Tosite Sigure, and the ending theme is "Rakuen no Kimi" (楽園の君) by österreich.

TC Entertainment released the series onto six volumes in Japan, with the first volume being released on June 27, 2018, and the final volume released on March 27, 2019.

Crunchyroll licensed the anime in North America and simulcasted the series while producing an English dub as it aired. The company released the first part on home media on May 28, 2019. Madman Entertainment licensed the series in Australia and New Zealand, who simulcasted the series on AnimeLab. Anime Limited licensed the series in the United Kingdom and Ireland, who simulcasted the series on Crunchyroll.

The thirteenth episode, the first of the second part, received an advanced screening event on Yahoo! Japan's GyaO! service on September 29, 2018, at 12:00 pm JST. The advanced screening only showcased the main part of the anime, with the opening and ending themes omitted. Outside of Japan, Wakanim provided an advanced screening on October 5, 2018, in France, and AnimeLab provided an advanced screening on October 8, 2018, in Australia and New Zealand.

== Episodes ==
No. overall	No. in season	Title (Note: English translated titles are taken from Crunchyroll.)	Directed by (Note: Information is taken from the ending credits of each episode.)	Original release date
Part 1
25	1	"START: Those Who Hunt"; Transliteration: "Karu Monotachi: Sutāto" (Japanese: 狩る者たち START)	Toshinori Watanabe	April 3, 2018
Quinx squad leader Kuki Urie and his frustrating underling Ginshi Shirazu are surveying Tokyo in search of the ghoul serial killer Torso, who has been killing women and eating their torsos but leaving the rest of their bodies. Eventually, they meet with photographer Chie Hori, who gives them valuable information in exchange for the underpants of senior Quinx Haise Sasaki. Hinami, now an Aogiri Tree member, warns Torso to be careful because they are close to catching him. Learning that the culprit is a taxi driver, Toru Mutsuki discovers him and is brutally attacked in his car. However, this allows Ginshi and Urie to locate the killer and lure him into a roadblock trap. While they face the killer, however, a mysterious and exceptionally strong ghoul named Orochi attacks, massacring all of the officers maintaining the roadblock, and allowing the taxi driver to escape. Sasaki appears and faces Orochi, but then suffers a hallucination of Ken Kaneki telling him to "accept" him in order to kill Orochi brutally. Sasaki then unleashes his kagune.
26	2	"member: Fragments"; Transliteration: "Kakera: Menbā" (Japanese: 欠片 member)	Toshinori Watanabe	April 10, 2018
When Sasaki removes Orochi's mask during their fight he is shocked to see the face of Nishio underneath, who calls him "Kaneki", prompting his memories to flicker back and forth and drive him insane. To prevent Sasaki from killing his fellow CCG agents, Akira Mado tranquilizes him. After returning to his senses, Sasaki demotes Urie for endangering his squadmates and promotes Ginshi to Quinx Squad leader. Sasaki then spars with Kisho Arima, before telling him that he was worried that the memories of his past self "Kaneki" were returning and that they might drive him away from his family with the Quinx Squad. Later, Torso meets with The Rabbit (Ayato Kirishima), to become a member of Aogiri Tree. Sasaki, Ginshi, and Mutsuki then begin investigating a ghoul nicknamed "Nutcracker" who has been crushing the testicles of her victims and stop by in the coffee shop:re. While at the shop, Sasaki recognizes and is recognized by Touka. After tasting the coffee she makes for him, he begins to cry, subconsciously recalling his time at Anteiku. He then thinks to himself that he had never before seen anyone so beautiful.
27	3	"fresh: Eve"; Transliteration: "Zen'yasai: Furesshu" (Japanese: 前夜祭 fresh)	Taiji Kawanishi	April 17, 2018
Kanae von Rosewald brings Shu Tsukiyama the underwear that Chie Hori had collected from Haise Sasaki, but the latter falls into despair after realizing that he couldn't recognize the scent as Kaneki's. Later, the Quinx Squad continue their investigation of Nutcracker and cross-dress to disguise themselves at a nightclub where she had been sighted. At the nightclub, two members of the Clowns recognize Sasaki as Kaneki and note that "for Kaneki to come out, Sasaki will have to 'die.'" The squad, alongside Juzo Suzuya, then follow up on a lead that takes them to the auction where the Nutcracker had been selling her victims to the gourmets. Note: This episode features an insert song by popular American youtuber and singer Amanda Lee.
28	4	"MAIN: Auction"; Transliteration: "Ōkushon: Mēn" (Japanese: オークション MAIN)	So Toyama	April 24, 2018
Kidnapped and entered into a circus-themed gourmet auction, Toru is sold off to Big Madam. However, Suzuya initiates an assault on the auction in which many ghouls and CCG operatives are killed. Eto watches the chaos from afar in amusement alongside Dr. Kanou, and sends in a mysterious ghoul called Takizawa, who brutally kills a squad leader. During the fray, Torso and Kanae fight over who gets to keep Toru.
29	5	"PresS: Night of Scattering"; Transliteration: "Chiri Yuku Yoru: Puresu" (Japanese: 散りゆく夜 Press)	Toshinori Watanabe	May 1, 2018
Takizawa, revealed to be former Investigator Seidou Takizawa, now a crazed one-eyed ghoul, slaughters an entire squad of CCG operatives, while another squad is killed by Nutcracker. Meanwhile, Sasaki and the Quinx Squad face off against Kanae, who furiously blames him for Tsukiyama's reduced mental state, but is critically injured and rescued by a mysterious ghoul named Matsumae. Big Madam and the other auctioneers are attacked by Suzuya and Urie, but mid-way through the fight, Urie is critically injured and swallowed by Big Madam. The episode ends with Takizawa leaping from above and attacking Sasaki, who is forced by his superiors to fight the SS-rated one-eyed ghoul alone.
30	6	"turn: In the End"; Transliteration: "Sono, Hate ni: Tān" (Japanese: その、果てに turn)	Masayuki Matsumoto	May 8, 2018
Sasaki suffers multiple hallucinations of Ken Kaneki, while Takizawa is beating him inside the auction room. Meanwhile, the Nutcracker is killed by Quinx Squad members Ginshi Shirazu and Saiko Yonebayashi. Big Madam fights both Urie, who nearly goes insane, and Mutsuki, who unleashes his kagune. She comes face to face with Juzo, who despite that he was tortured and emasculated by her, is unable to kill her. She is eventually wounded by fellow Suzuya squad member Hanbee Abara, who covers Juzo's ears while the CCG investigators kill her. Meanwhile, Hinami, realizing that Sasaki is Kaneki, and Saiko, on hearing Sasaki's screams, both rush into the auction room, where Hinami fights Takizawa in order to save him. Sasaki fearfully accepts his Kaneki side and fights Takizawa. They both pierce each other with their kagunes and fall down.
31	7	"mind: Days of Recollections"; Transliteration: "Kokorooboe Arishi Hibi: Maindo" (Japanese: 心覚え在りし日々 mind)	Toshinori Watanabe	May 15, 2018
Hinami is arrested by CCG operators led by Kisho Arima. Sasaki, having survived his encounter with Takizawa, saves her from execution by asking to take her into custody. She is imprisoned in Cochlea ghoul prison. In the following weeks after the operation, the members of the Quinx Squad are being promoted while Sasaki becomes senior investigator. At the next morning, he hallucinates that an investigator is Yamori. The same night, Sen Takatsuki (Eto) delivers him a package with Kaneki's old mask and a book signed by her in it. He goes to the :re cafe where he is served coffee by Touka. After he leaves, Touka, Uta, Yomo and Nishio discuss about Kaneki. Sasaki starts searching about Kaneki and then suffers a hallucination of Yoshimura and Anteiku. On the same night, Tsukiyama still is in terrible pain despite eating many 'meals'.
32	8	"TAKe: One Who Writhes"; Transliteration: "Ugomeku Mono: Tēku" (Japanese: 蠢くモノ TAKe)	Taiji Kawanishi	May 22, 2018
Tsukiyama is always hungry and can't control his kagune.In the meantime, Tatara refuses Ayato's request to rescue Hinami from Cochlea. Sasaki is approached by the ghoul investigators Nimura Furuta and Shiki Kijima who tell him that he is going to work them on the upcoming Rose Investigation. In CCG HQ, Sasaki and the Quinx Squad are informed by the investigator Kori Ui about the Rose ghoul gang (actually members of the Tsukiyama crime family), who attack Furuta and Kijima. They are saved by the investigator Hairu Ihei. Gang member Yuuma is arrested and tortured by Kijima in Cochlea. Sasaki visits Uta to learn more about the mask and Takatsuki's book, who in turn lies about both of those things. Sasaki then asks him to make him a new mask. Chie Hori delivers Sasaki's photos to Kanae von Rosewald and Tsukiyama recognizes him as 'The' Kaneki.
33	9	"play: Ghost"; Transliteration: "Bōrei: Purē" (Japanese: 亡霊 play)	Toshinori Watanabe	May 29, 2018
Tsukiyama wants to make Sasaki remember that he is Kaneki. He and Kanae find him on the street, along with the Quinx Squad, and Tsukiyama runs towards him but falls down. Sasaki hears him saying "Kaneki" but he doesn't recognise him. Sasaki goes to Uta's shop and orders masks for the entire Quinx Squad, in order to impersonate ghouls for the upcoming Rose Investigation. Kori Ui rejects the plan, knowing that Sasaki is a ghoul. In the meantime, Kijima's video of him torturing Yuuma brutally and provoking Rose gang to kill him has gone viral. Tsukiyama plans to release him and to use Kaneki/Sasaki as a key person by restoring his memories. Tsukiyama makes many failed attempts to speak to Sasaki, so Kanae bribes some Aogiri members to attack the Squad in order to isolate Sasaki. However, Yamori's old gang attacks Sasaki by accident and Mutsuki battles with Torso but he is attacked by the ghoul Grave Robber. Sasaki kills his attackers with his kagune. Saiko is almost killed but for Amon Kotaru, who is revealed to be alive. Eto watches the entire scene.
34	10	"think: Sway"; Transliteration: "Yureru: Shinku" (Japanese: ゆれる think)	Masayuki Matsumoto	June 5, 2018
Kanae comes face to face with Eto who first toys with him and then attacks him with her full power. It's revealed that Kanae loves Tsukiyama but he doesn't, so Kanae wishes he could kill Sasaki. Eto tells him that she will "be his god" and captures him. Back on the CCG HQ, Sasaki asks Ui to reconsider his plan about ghoul impersonation and Ui agrees. The same night, Sasaki wears Kaneki's mask and along with the Quinx Squad start a patrol. Sasaki is recognised by ghouls as Eyepatch, so he starts finding information about him. He learns that the Eyepatch was the one who "killed" Amon and he sees again a Kaneki hallucination crying about killing Amon. Tsukiyama meets again with Sasaki who asks him if he is a ghoul and if he knows Ken Kaneki. Tsukiyama refuses to tell him. CCG's chairman, Tsuneyoshi Washu, gives Ui permission to kill Tsukiyama's family. On the same night, Tsukiyama's father drugs him in order to keep him safe. The CCG are at the front of the Tsukiyama mansion ready to attack. Tsukiyama's father allows himself to be arrested while Tsukiyama takes control of the family as the CCG arrives in his hideout. In the meantime, Kanae is tortured and mutilated by Eto.
35	11	"writE: The Absent One"; Transliteration: "Ketsuraku-sha: Raito" (Japanese: 欠落者 writE)	Toshinori Watanabe	June 12, 2018
Kijima, Nimura Furuta, Sasaki, and the Quinx Squad are killing ghouls on the Tsukiyama hideout. In the meantime, Tsukiyama begrudgingly says goodbye to his friends who tell him to go to the rooftop where a helicopter is going to take him away. Kori Ui sends Sasaki on the roof. Tsukiyama arrives there too and comes face to face with Sasaki. Sasaki tells Tsukiyama to surrender but Tsukiyama attacks him. Meanwhile, Kanae is now insane and attacks CCG investigators on the hideout. Hariu Ihei is wounded badly by Matsumae and makes a final stand but Matsumae decapitates her. Kijima arrives on the scene but Matsumae slices him up and cuts him in two with his own quinque killing him. Furuta protects himself from one of Matsumae's attacks by using another agent as a human shield, and then kills Matsumae with Kijima's quinque. The Quinx Squad come face to face with Noro. Sasaki fights with Tsukiyama and in a moment of weakness, loses his hand by an attack from Kanae. Noro is destroyed by Ginshi Shirazu but he doesn't die. Kanae tries to kill Sasaki, who starts to remember that Arima was mocking him for his defeat at his hands. Sasaki escapes Kanae who is revealed to be a woman named Karren. Eto arrives on the scene with her form as the One-Eyed Owl.
36	12	"Beautiful Dream: Dawn"; Transliteration: "Yoake: Byūtifuru Dorīmu" (Japanese: 夜明け Beautiful Dream)	Toshinori Watanabe	June 19, 2018
As the battle on the hideout continues, Sasaki is attacked by Eto, who reveals her identity as Sen Takatsuki and addresses him as Kaneki. She watches as Karren brutally attacks Sasaki and kicks him in the head multiple times. Inside his mind, Sasaki sees a child version of Kaneki whom he strangles. As the child curses him, Sasaki realizes that he is Kaneki as he sees a memory of his mother abusing him. He remembers Hide and his battle with Arima, who pierced him in the head with his quinque and brainwashed him in the aftermath of that incident. With his memories back and rc cells unsuppressed, Sasaki's hair turns black and he accepts his fate of being who he is and has had the responsibility to always be—Kaneki Ken. Meanwhile, Kori Ui and the rest of CCG find Furuta, who has killed all the other CCG investigators unbeknownst to anybody else and, claims to be the sole survivor. Kaneki fights with Karren, piercing her mercilessly with his kagune as Tsukiyama watches. Although Kaneki recognises Tsukiyama, he stabs him. Meanwhile, Urie and Shirazu fight and kill Noro, but Shirazu ends up dying due to his injuries. Kaneki and Eto fight, running from the windows towards the roof of the hideout. Kaneki destroys her kakuja, ripping her apart. Eto falls from the building while declaring her love for him. Kori Ui finds Kaneki devouring Eto's kakuja on the roof. Kaneki pretends to still be Sasaki and throws Tsukiyama from the building. Karren falls along with him in order to save him, however she falls down to her death. Kaneki meets the Quinx Squad and sees Shirazu's body. Kaneki coldly blames Urie for Shirazu's death and calls him weak. Tsukiyama is saved by Touka, Yomo and Chie Hori. Naki and other Aogiri Tree members steal Shirazu's corpse.
Part 2
37	13	"Place: And So, Once Again"; Transliteration: "Soshite, Mōichido: Purēsu" (Japanese: そして、もう一度 Place)	Taiji Kawanishi	September 29, 2018 (GyaO! screening); October 9, 2018
The CCG has found Aogiri's base in Rushima, an island in Tokyo Bay, and have launched their assault. Meanwhile Ken Kaneki, still living as Haise Sasaki despite regaining his memory, and Nimura Furuta arrest Sen Takatsuki's (Eto) editor in order for him to confess that Takatsuki is a ghoul. After exiting the room, Nimura tells Kaneki that Hinami is about to be executed in the coming days. In a press conference about her last book, Takatsuki reveals that she is a ghoul and that her last book is about uniting ghouls and humans. Kaneki arrives and arrests her. As they arrive at Cochlea, Eto tells him that in the book lies the truth about the CCG: the Washuu family, CCG's leading family, are working with the ghoul organization V, the same one who killed her mother, and that Rize Kamishiro was a ghoul who fled from V. In a V meeting, Kaiko orders Nimura to find out if Eto is the One-Eyed King, the semi-mythical leader of Aogiri. Kaiko also confirms that they have found Shachi's (Rize's foster father) hideout in the meeting and orders Kishou Arima to locate him and make him reveal Rize's location. Arima and his squad find and kill Shachi after he refuses to answer them. In Cochlea, Nimura tries to learn from Eto the identity of the King. Eto mocks him and hints that Nimura is also a Washuu unable to call his real father "father". Nimura reveals to Eto that he killed and cooked her editor as he exits the room. Eto later tells Kaneki that he must kill the King. As Ayato joins up with Banjou and his gang, they ready a plan to attack Cochlea and free Hinami. A riot begins at Cochlea as they launch their assault. During the chaos, Kaneki walks into Hinami's cell and tells her it's time for them to leave.
38	14	"VOLT: White Darkness"; Transliteration: "Shiroi Yami: Bōruto" (Japanese: 白い闇 VOLT)	Taiji Kawanishi	October 16, 2018
Ayato, Banjou and his gang storm into Cochlea and massacre several CCG guards. As Kaneki walks into Hinami's cell he decides that he intends to save her as his last job and get killed by Arima. Arima arrives at Cochlea and attacks Ayato. As Ayato is about to be killed, Yomo and Touka arrive and save him. It is revealed in a flashback that Yomo is actually Touka and Ayato's uncle as their mother, Hikari, was his sister. Hikari was killed by Arima while her husband Arata wasn't able to save her. Arata became a kakuja in order to be stronger but was eventually killed by Kureo Mado and Shinohara while Yomo joined Anteiku and Yoshimura. Touka, Ayato and Yomo continue their battle against Arima. During their escape from the hallway, Kaneki and Hinami come across Nimura who mockingly fights Kaneki and Hinami, but is defeated quickly when Hinami pierces his chest with her kagune. Kaneki arrives just in time to save Yomo from being killed by Arima. As they all escape with Hinami, Kaneki tries to buy them some time by fighting Arima. As they face off, they descend into the depths of Cochlea, both landing into a flower pit at the very bottom. Arima arms himself with the Owl's quinque and injures Kaneki many times while calling him weak, stating that he had the opportunity to kill him many times. Kaneki unleashes his kakuja for battle. Meanwhile, Nimura and several V agents turn on the machine that Touka, Hinami and the other fleeing ghouls are using to escape. Suddenly, Eto breaks out of her cell and chases Nimura after defeating the other V agents. As she is about to kill him, he reveals that Akihiro Kanou turned him into a ghoul by matching him with Rize's kagune, and he uses it to destroy her kakuja and defeat her. Back at the pit, Kaneki is injured multiple times by Arima and as he is about to give up and let Arima to kill him, he envisions a hallucination of Hide telling him to live. Coming back to reality, Kaneki launches at Arima's quinque and destroys it. After Kaneki declares the fight over and declines the notion that he would kill him, Arima slices his own throat with the severed quinque he held onto.
39	15	"union: Cross Game"; Transliteration: "Kurosu Gēmu: Yunion" (Japanese: クロスゲーム union)	Masayuki Matsumoto	October 23, 2018
During the Rushima Landing Operation, Torso strangles Mutsuki and takes him captive into a cave. Meanwhile, Hanbee Abara is attacked by Kurona Yasuhisa who seeks revenge on Juzo for severely wounding her sister, Nashiro. As she defeats him and is about to kill him, Juzo appears and saves him as he proceeds to battle Kurona. Inside a nearby building, Akira, Houji and a CCG squad face Tatara. Tatara, who lost his brother to Houji, fights them in his kakuja form. Kurona reveals to Juzo that she keeps Nashiro inside of her as a parasitic humanoid face in her abdomen to save her from dying. She believes that Dr. Kanou, who made them ghouls, will save her life later down the line. Juzo tells to her that Nashiro is already dead and defeats her as she narrowly escapes. Meanwhile, Tatara is betrayed and killed by Takizawa, who wanted revenge on him for mutilating and capturing him during the Anteiku raid as well as allowing Kanou to torture him in order to create the "perfect" Kaneki. As the CCG squad apprehends him, Takizawa kills Houji and the group. Suddenly, Amon appears and saves Akira from being strangled to death by Takizawa, revealing he was also captured and turned into a ghoul by Kanou, but was considered a "failed" experiment to him. An injured Kurona finds Kanou in his lab and asks him to save Nashiro. Kanou mocks her belief that she's alive and explains to her that Nashiro was dead even after the fusion. Kurona decides to kill him as revenge, however he unleashes his Quinx clone experiments to defend himself. Takizawa fights and defeats Amon as Quinx Squad arrives in order to fight him. Kurona fights Kanou's Quinx experiments and denounces him, calling him crazy. Nishio arrives in Kanou's lab and captures him. Meanwhile, as Naki and the White Suits are surrounded by the CCG, Tsukiyama appears offering help.
40	16	"vive: Those Left Behind"; Transliteration: "Nokoshita Mono: Bību" (Japanese: 遺したもの vive)	Hye Jin Seo	October 30, 2018
Tsukiyama saves Naki and the White Suites by killing the CCG agents. Nishio is forced to fight Clown members Shikorae and Roma Hoito while Kanou escapes. At the same time, Takizawa fights with the Quinx Squad and as Urie is about to kill him, Akira protects him by putting herself up as a human shield. She apologizes to him for being unable to save him during the Anteiku raid and collapses wounded. Amon holds off the Quinx Squad and orders Takizawa to take her to safety in which he does. Amon fights the Quinx Squad with his giant kakuja. Saiko defeats him but is unable to finish him off upon realizing that he was the one who saved her life, allowing him to escape. Meanwhile, aboard the ship where Yoshitoki Washuu is located, Itsuki Marude confronts him. He tells him that because of Takatsuki's book he conducted a research on the Washuu family and discovered that they are actually ghouls, making the CCG an anti-ghoul agency governed by ghouls. He shoots Yoshitoki in the head hoping to be wrong, but Yoshitoki unleashes his ghoul powers as defense and confirms the rumor. Later, Matsuri discovers his father Yoshitoki's body. Back at Cochlea, Donato Porpora escapes from his cell and kills the prison's director. Uta appears giving him a clown mask and later, Nimura, Donato, Uta and several V agents assassinate CCG's chairman Tsuneyoshi Washuu, the father of Yoshitoki, Nimura, Arima and Rize in his office. Meanwhile in the flower pit of Cochlea, while on the verge of death from striking himself, Arima reveals to Kaneki that he, Nimura and all the other agents raised in the Sunlit Garden are actually half-human, Illegitimate members of the Washuu family, having ghoul father and human mothers. Arima explains that half-humans live shorter than normal humans, and that he was on the verge of death regardless of killing himself. He additionally reveals that the Washuu family are ghouls, that he hated his very own existence for the sole purpose of killing ghouls and that he is in fact the One-Eyed King. He was conspiring with Eto all along to find a ghoul that could kill him in order to become a symbol for peace between ghouls and humans. He begs Kaneki to take the credit for his death before finally dying from his injuries, and Kaneki accepts his plea.
41	17	"MovE: Confluence, Confusion"; Transliteration: "Deai, Tomadoi: Mūbu" (Japanese: 出会い、とまどい MovE)	Toru Yoshida	November 6, 2018
The next day after saving his friends from Cochlea, Kaneki holds a meeting in Touka's coffee shop between his friends, former Aogiri members and Arima's Squad who defected from CCG to join him. He declares himself as the One Eyed King and starts a new ghoul organization purposed to unite humans and ghouls through force. The organization's name is Goat. The other ghouls accept him as their leader, with the exception of Naki due to Yamori's death; however, he comes along too. Meanwhile, after the death of the members of the Washuu family, several CCG's offices are attacked by ghouls. At the same time, Akira, who is also in Touka's shop, is gravely ill due to her injuries. Nico appears and gives Nishiki the address of Dr Ogura, the leader of the Great Wheel Act, a ghoul rights organization. Kaneki, Nishio and Tsukiyama meet him, and he offers his support as well as his doctors in order to cure Akira. Kaneki reunites with Amon and they have a conversation about Kaneki's motives on forming Goat. Upon hearing that Akira is awake, Amon visits her (bringing her cat, also). He apologizes for not revealing himself to her sooner; Akira, however, doesn't feel anything about it. Later, Touka takes Akira for a walk. She reveals that she was the one who killed her father due to him killing Hinami's parents. Touka takes her to a playground where she sees ghoul children and former Aogiri (now Goat) members, playing. After they hug, Touka sends them to hug Akira. After that, Hinami, unable to hate Kureo Mado, hugs Akira as well. Upon hearing her heartbeat, Akira realizes that she no longer hates ghouls and that her life is now empty.
42	18	"FACE: Effulgence"; Transliteration: "Kakukakutaru: Fēsu" (Japanese: 赫赫たる FACE)	Taiji Kawanishi	November 13, 2018
Mutsuki has lost his mind after the fight with Torso, making him realize that he is in love with sensei, aka Kaneki. Furuta has become the head of the Washuu clan and is now leading the CCG. He instructed Suzuya to become the new Arima and announced their next plan of action in order to fight off the Clowns. After stopping the various assaults that happened simultaneously in the 9th, 2nd, 18th, and 19th Ward, the Clowns army came right outside the door of the CCG headquarters where Suzuya started fighting with No Face and where they realized that the majority of the Clowns are humans that are forced into fighting against their will. Meanwhile, Urie is fighting against Donato and after losing the battle he goes berserk and Saiko tries to get him back to his senses. Before the episode ends, Furuta visits Mutsuki in the hospital and then we see him in a huge meeting of the CCG, making a speech about how they will destroy all the ghouls and presenting a new Quinx Squad named Oggai.
43	19	"proof: Bonds"; Transliteration: "Kizuna: Purūfu" (Japanese: 紲 proof)	Hiroaki Kudō	November 20, 2018
Kaneki, Nishiki, and Tsukiyama try to save some ghouls that are attacked by CCG, but arrive too late and everyone is already dead. Next day, as Kaneki tries to come up with the next plan of action, Touka reveals her 'feelings' for him and asks him to trust his friends more and not do things by himself. Mutsuki comes in the coffee shop and starts attacking them, because he wants his 'sensei' to come back and join the CCG. They manage to escape and find themselves in an abandoned tower where they have sex. Meanwhile, Takeomi Kuroiwa and Yoriko get married but unfortunately Furuta finds out about her relationship with Touka when they were students and locks Yoriko away. As Nishiki checks up on Kaneki, he implies to him that Touka is actually pregnant which he verifies with her himself later on and they decide to get married as well. Furuta and the Clowns are preparing for their attack on the ghouls where they are going to use their final secret weapon.
44	20	"incarnation: Awakened Child"; Transliteration: "Mezameta ko: Inkānēshon" (Japanese: めざめた子 incarnation)	Masayuki Matsumoto	November 27, 2018
In the banquet of Kaneki and Touka's wedding, Mutsuki and the rest of the CCG forces invade and start attacking them. Meanwhile, Urie and Kuroiwa go to confront Furuta in the CCG headquarters and try to prove that he does not take sane and reasonable decisions. When they go inside his office, they are attacked by Roma who ends up being the SSS rate ghoul named Dodgy Mother and Shikorae, where Kuroiwa gets badly injured but Urie manages to kill them both. Furuta stabs Kuroiwa in the head and later on, Maruda comes in and shoots him but doesn't kill him. He is accompanied by Hide who asks for Urie's help. Deep underground, Touka is fighting with Mutsuki while Tsukiyama, Nishio, and Yomo are against the Suzuya squad and Kaneki fights the Oggai squad. Soon, Suzuya starts attacking Kaneki and they engage into a huge fight but Kaneki realizes that Touka is cornered and in danger and goes to her rescue. After being brutally torn to pieces by the Oggai squad, Kaneki releases his inner beast and produces probably the biggest kagune ever seen.
45	21	"Morse: Remembrances"; Transliteration: "Kokorooboe: Mōsu" (Japanese: 心覚え Morse)	Mitsuhiro Yoneda	December 4, 2018
Kaneki and his 'dragon' kagune is out of control and kills everyone in its path. Furuta meets Mutsuki and tells her that the Oggai was the reason why Kaneki turned into a beast and that everything is her fault. Kanou is confronted by Kurona and before shooting himself with a gun, he confesses that people will now figure out the possibilities of using ghouls for medical purposes. The ghouls meet up with Hide and go to the CCG Headquarters in order to form an alliance and save Kaneki. After agreeing to work together, Nishino reveals to them that the only way to destroy this monster is by finding and extracting Kaneki's body in order for the kagune to decay. Touka then remembers that she gave Kaneki her parents' ring and suggests to use metal detectors to find his body through the massive kagune that has spread around the city. As the CCG and the ghouls work together to find his body, 'dragon' starts releasing monsters made from its own mass that attack everyone. The CCG fights off the monsters as the rest carry on with the search. Mutsuki then comes up to Urie and Yonebayashi blaming himself for the situation and trying to kill them but the Quinx squad talks to him, making him realize that he has been part of their 'family' all along.
46	22	"call: The Far Side of Tragedy"; Transliteration: "Higeki no Hate: Kōru" (Japanese: 悲劇の果て call)	Hye Jin Seo, Toshinori Watanabe	December 11, 2018
Kaneki is lost in his thoughts and after having a meaningful conversation with Rize, he steps out of his 'mind realm'. Touka finds his body and they all take him to the CCG headquarters where he regains his consciousness. Realizing that humans and ghouls are now working together for the greater good, he goes to see the city with Urie and Yonebayashi. At that time, Furuta broadcasts scenes of the monster attacking the people and showing that they are made of some sort of poison that will turn every human into a ghoul. Kaneki and the rest run to the scene only to be attacked by the same monsters that manages to poison Yonebayashi. Kaneki kills all of the monsters and they return to the CCG where they are informed that Yonebayashi along with anyone who breathed the poison has now turned into a ghoul. Later on, Kaneki meets up with Hide and makes him remove his mask to witness his face and what he has done to him. Before the episode ends, Kaneki decides to fight back along with everyone's help.
47	23	"ACT: Encounters"; Transliteration: "Kaigō: Akuto" (Japanese: 邂逅 ACT)	Toshinori Watanabe	December 18, 2018
It's discovered that the dragon has another core. In order to prevent poison from being released, turning all humans into ghouls, it needs to be destroyed. Kaneki alone is resistant to the poison and while he attempts to destroy the core the ghouls join with the CCG to fight with the Clowns and save the city. As the tide is swinging in their favor, a ghoul with an appearance similar to the Owl's joins the fight. Hinami learns that it's being controlled by Donato, who is confronted by Kotaro. Meanwhile Uta and Itori fight Yomo and are defeated, but Yomo refuses to kill. Amon kills Donato, his son, who confesses that he never hated his father in spite of fighting against him and the CCG. Ayato fights off monsters while Kaneki continues deeper underground, and finds Furuta guarding the dragon's core.
48	24	"The Final Episode (Note: This episode does not have an official title in Japan, however Crunchyroll lists this as the title in its release.)"	Toshinori Watanabe	December 25, 2018
Furuta and Kaneki fight, while dialoguing about their ideals and shared history. Above ground, the losing CCG and ghoul forces are saved by the appearance of Takizawa, the White Suits, Kurona, as well as Matsuri who reappears. Kaneki defeats Furuta, telling him that in spite of the evils in the world and suffering he personally went through, he would not have chosen any other path. Kaneki realizes that Rize's body is the core's energy source and is able to release her, resulting in her death and stopping the release of the poison. Six years later, Tokyo has returned to normal and humans and ghouls live peacefully together. Kaneki, Touka, and their baby daughter are visited by Hide and their friends and they enjoy a cup of coffee together.

== Home media release ==
=== Japanese ===
TC Entertainment (Japan – Region 2/A)
Vol.	Episodes	Blu-ray / DVD artwork	Release date	Ref.
1	1–2	Ginshi Shirazu, Tōru Mutsuki, Haise Sasaki, Kuki Urie, Saiko Yonebayashi	June 27, 2018	
2	3–4	Kuki Urie, Ginshi Shirazu	July 25, 2018	
3	5–6	Tōru Mutsuki, Saiko Yonebayashi	August 29, 2018	
4	7–8	Jūzō Suzuya, Keijin Nakarai, Hanbē Abara, Mizurō Tamaki, Miyuki Mikage	September 26, 2018	
5	9–10	Kanae von Rosewald, Shū Tsukiyama	October 31, 2018	
6	11–12	Nimura Furuta, Eto	November 28, 2018	
1	13–15	Ken Kaneki, Kishō Arima	December 21, 2018	
2	16–18	Ken Kaneki, Shū Tsukiyama	January 30, 2019	
3	19–21	Ken Kaneki, Hideyoshi Nagachika	February 27, 2019	
4	22–24	Ichika Kaneki, Ken Kaneki, Touka Kirishima	March 27, 2019	

=== English ===
Crunchyroll LLC (North America – Region 1/A)
Part	Episodes	Release date	Ref.
1	1–12	May 28, 2019	
2	13–24	October 8, 2019	

Madman Entertainment (Australia and New Zealand – Region 4/B)
Part	Episodes	Release date	Ref.
1	1–12	August 7, 2019	
2	13–24	December 4, 2019	
