= Kakurenbo =

Kakurenbo: Hide & Seek
- Theatrical poster.
- Directed by: Shuhei Morita
- Written by: Shuhei Morita
- Produced by: Shuhei Morita
- Starring: Junko Takeuchi; Akiko Kobayashi
- Production company: YamatoWorks
- Release date: March 2005
- Running time: 25 minutes
- Language: Japanese

Kakurenbo: Hide & Seek (カクレンボ, Kakurenbo; lit. 'Hide and Seek') is a Japanese cel-shaded anime short film written and directed by Shuhei Morita.

The film entails a game of "Otokoyo" (オトコヨ; lit. Man Hunt), a version of hide and seek played by children, wearing fox masks, near the ruins of an abandoned old Kowloon-inspired city. The children who play this disappear, believed to be spirited away by demons. Kakurenbo follows Hikora, a boy who joins the game with hopes of finding his missing sister, Sorincha. The storyline is built on the idea that Tokyo is losing its natural aesthetic, which includes child's games such as hide and seek in order for industrial progress to ensue i.e. lighting the city of Tokyo costing innocence of childhood games.

== Characters ==
Hikora (ヒコラ)
Voiced by: Junko Takeuchi (Japanese); Michael Sinterniklaas (English)
The young boy who plays the game to find his missing sister.
Sorincha (ソリンチャ)
Voiced by: Masami Suzuki (Japanese); Veronica Taylor (English)
Hikora's sister who went missing when she played the game with the other children.
Yaimao (ヤイマオ)
Voiced by: Makoto Ueki (Japanese); Dan Green (English)
Hikora's best friend who plays the game to lend a hand in finding Sorincha.
Noshiga (ノシガ)
Voiced by: Ryo Naito (Japanese); Sean Schemmel (English)
The leader of his little gang who claims is not afraid of demons.
Tachiji (タチジ)
Voiced by: Mika Ishibashi (Japanese); Tom Wayland (English)
One of the members in Noshiga's gang. He has blond hair and wears glasses.
Suku (スク)
Voiced by: Akiko Kobayashi (Japanese); Veronica Taylor (English)
Another member of Noshiga's gang. He is short and has a large, red scarf.
Inmu (インム) and Yanku (ヤンク)
Twin brothers with a dark past. Their reason for playing is a mystery.

=== Demons ===
Once the seven children pass through the gates to enter the abandoned streets, they are pursued by four different demons and then finally by the one demon who is "it". They guard the battery tower within the center of the city, where every child they catch is taken to be used as power cells for the city. The tower has socket rows that go on to the very first children who played.

Kimotori (肝取鬼; lit. 'Liver-Taker')
A three-armed, four-legged, red humanoid demon that holds a mechanical wheel on its back. Captures Tachiji, and then Suku.
Chitori (血取鬼; lit. 'Blood-Taker')
A horned komainu demon that wears a tarp over its back. Captures Noshiga.
Aburatori (油取鬼; lit. 'Oil-Taker')
The twin child-like demons. One is sitting on a menacing-looking cart, while the other pulls it. Captures both Inmu and Yanku.
Kotori (子取鬼; lit. 'Child-Taker')
A spider-like demon with eight arms. Captures Yaimao.
Oshira-sama (おしら様; lit. 'Great White Lord')
A nine-tailed fox who is the leader of the demons. It possesses the last child who wins the game of "Otokoyo", and wears a fox mask that changes into an oni mask that the person who is "it" wears. In the beginning of the film, it possessed Sorincha (who apparently won the game before Hikora), and in the end, it possessed Hikora after he won the game.

== Reception ==
Kakurenbo premiered in March 2005 at the Tokyo International Anime Fair, where it won the award for Notable Entry in the General Category. In Korea, it received a Best Film Nomination at the Seoul Comics and Animation Festival. It then went on to win Best Short film at the Fantasia Festival in Montreal.

It was shown on Adult Swim in October 2005 for Halloween.
