= Hero Mask =

Japanese original net animation

- Blu-Ray cover for North American release
- Genre: Crime, action
- Original net animation
- Directed by: Hiroyasu Aoki
- Written by: Hiroyasu Aoki
- Music by: Hisaki Kato
- Studio: Pierrot
- Licensed by: Netflix: NA: Sentai Filmworks
- Released: December 3, 2018 (#1–15); August 23, 2019 (#16–24)
- Runtime: 24 minutes
- Episodes: 24
- Manga

Hero Mask: A lost memory
- Written by: Yuuki Kodama
- Published by: LINE
- Magazine: LINE Manga
- Original run: July 7, 2020 – present

Hero Mask (stylized as HERO≠MASK) is a Japanese original net animation (ONA) series produced by Pierrot for Netflix. The series is written and directed by Hiroyasu Aoki, and premiered worldwide on December 3, 2018. A second season premiered on August 23, 2019.

In June 2020, it was announced that Hero Mask would receive a manga spin-off titled Hero Mask: A lost memory which would be serialized on the LINE Manga app starting on July 7, 2020. The anime aired on Tokyo MX from July 2, 2020, to December 10, 2020, making it the first true Netflix original anime to broadcast on linear television in Japan.

== Plot ==
Set in a fictional version of London, James Blood is a hot-blooded officer working for the elite "Special Service of Crime" (SSC) division within the Capital Police Department. Sarah Sinclair is a subordinate to Crown Prosecutor Monica Campbell, whose witness suddenly drops dead while working on a high-profile case involving the LIVE Corporation. Shortly thereafter, the police station is attacked by an enemy James thought long dead. James ends up teaming with Sarah to uncover the perpetrators behind these events, dragging them into a conspiracy involving LIVE, escaped prisoners who supposedly died years ago, and masks that give their wearers superhuman abilities.

== Characters ==
James Blood (ジェームズ・ブラッド, Jēmuzu Buraddo)
Voiced by: Yasuyuki Kase (Japanese); Greg Chun (English; Netflix Dub); Chris Patton (English; Sentai Filmworks Dub)
A hot-blooded Detective Inspector (DI) working with the SSC in the Capital Police Department. After fighting off his arch-nemesis Grimm, who he thought to be dead, multiple times, he decides to look for answers with Sarah. Later, he also protects Tina from Geffrey Connor. Gets exposed to the same energy experienced by Julia Herst when she died, leaving him to use a Mask similar to Tina's.
Sarah Sinclair (サラ・シンクレア, Sara Shinkurea)
Voiced by: Yūko Kaida (Japanese); Lauren Landa (English; Netflix Dub); Luci Christian (English; Sentai Filmworks Dub)
An assistant attorney working in the Crown Prosecution Service (CPS). After she witnesses Monica collapse in the street before giving her vital information, she believes she was murdered, and teams up with James to find the perpetrator. She also works with Oliver Henderson to figure out the connection between Live Corporation and Monica.
Lennox Gallagher (レノックス・ギャラガー, Renokkusu Gyaragā)
Voiced by: Junpei Morita (Japanese); Brad Venable (English; Netflix Dub); Josh Morrison (English; Sentai Filmworks Dub)
Detective Chief Inspector (DCI) Gallagher is the Senior Investigation Officer (SIO) of the Mask case and James' superior at the SSC.
Edmond “Eddie” Chandler (エドモンド・チャンドラー, Edomondo Chandorā)
Voiced by: Kentaro Takano (Japanese); Landon McDonald (English; Netflix Dub); Blake Shepard (English; Sentai Filmworks Dub)
A technical specialist and Detective Sergeant (DS) at the SSC who designs and maintains multiple gadgets for the organization, including the "GPS Bullets" that James is fond of using.
Harry Creighton (ハリー・クレイトン, Harī Kureiton)
Voiced by: Kōki Uchiyama (Japanese); Chris Niosi (English; Netflix Dub); Andrew Love (English; Sentai Filmworks Dub)
A former SSC detective who disappeared after his girlfriend collapsed one day. Currently working as a mercenary for the LIVE Corporation, helping Geffrey Connor continue research on the Masks.
Geffrey Connor (ジェフリー・コーナー, Jefurī Kōnā)
Voiced by: Yutaka Aoyama (Japanese); Cam Clarke (English; Netflix Dub); Jay Hickman (English; Sentai Filmworks Dub)
One of the researchers for the development of the Masks, he is determined to see the Masks' fruition, using Harry Creighton to hunt down opposition and investigators. Believes that technology should be made for humankind at the expense of some.
Steven Martland (スティーブン・マートランド, Sutībun Mātorando)
Voiced by: Takayuki Sugō (Japanese); Jason Marnocha (English; Netflix Dub); John Gremillion (English; Sentai Filmworks Dub)
The CEO of Live Corporation, he is heavily connected to the development of the Masks.
Richard Burner (リチャード・バーナー, Richādo Bānā)
Voiced by: Yutaka Nakano (Japanese); Armen Taylor (English; Netflix Dub); Mark Laskowski (English; Sentai Filmworks Dub)
The Detective Chief Superintendent (DCS) in charge of the SSC. He resigns after the death of his wife during a bank robbery.
Monica Campbell (モニカ・キャンベル, Monika Kyanberu)
Voiced by: Haruka Shibuya (Japanese); Julia McIivaine (English; Netflix Dub); Sara Gaston (English; Sentai Filmworks Dub)
An investigator for the SSC that worked at Ecohes, she was killed by Live Corporation for getting too deep into the investigation of the development of the Masks.
Fred Faraday (フレッド・ファラデー, Fureddo Faradē)
Voiced by: Tomoyuki Shimura (Japanese) Cam Clarke (English; Netflix Dub); Joe Daniels (English; Sentai Filmworks Dub)
One of the researchers for the development of the Masks. Also the brother of Geffrey Connor, believing that technology should help everyone without the expense of others.
Jeremy "Grimm" Payne (ジェレミー・ペイン "グリム", Jeremī Pein "Gurimu")
Voiced by: Yūichi Karasuma (Japanese); Sean Chiplock (English; Netflix Dub); Scott Gibbs (English; Sentai Filmworks Dub)
A criminal who is known for a string of killings and is known to be mentally unstable. He heavily dislikes James since James had arrested him and put him in prison. Used as a test subject for the masks before escaping.
Eve Palmer (イヴ・パーマー, Ivu Pāmā)
Voiced by: Yukiyo Fujii (Japanese); Kira Buckland (English; Netflix Dub); Tayler Fono (English; Sentai Filmworks Dub)
Harry Creighton's lover, she suffered heart failure, leading to Harry Creighton defecting from the SSC.
Anna Winehouse (アンナ・ワインハウス, Anna Wainhausu)
Voiced by: Tomoko Miyadera (Japanese); Rachel Robinson (English; Netflix Dub); Christine Auten (English; Sentai Filmworks Dub)
The CEO of the drug company Ecohes, helps James to keep Tina from getting captured by Geffrey Connor.
Theo Lowe (セオ・ロー, Seo Rō)
Voiced by: Xander Mobus (English; Netflix Dub); Adam Gibbs (English; Sentai Filmworks Dub)
A criminal who took multiple doctors hostage in a hospital to get a heart transplant for his daughter. Theo supposedly died in prison but was secretly used as a test subject for the masks before escaping with the others. Wishes to see his estranged family before he dies.
Tina Herst (ティナ・ハースト, Tina Hāsuto)
Voiced by: Yū Shimamura (Japanese); Kayli Mills (English; Netflix Dub); Hilary Haag (English; Sentai Filmworks Dub)
Her father, William Herst (ウィリアム・ハースト), takes care of her as her mother, Julia Herst (ジュリア・ハースト), died in an accident during the development of the Masks, pregnant with :Tina. Tina was also exposed to the energy of the accident, and was given a Mask to perpetually keep her from dying from the energy. Geffrey Connor wants her mask in order to finish the Masks.

== Production ==
=== Anime ===
The series is written and directed by Hiroyasu Aoki and is animated by Studio Pierrot. Takahisa Katagiri is providing the series' character designs, and Hisaki Kato is composing the music. The 15-episode first season premiered worldwide on Netflix on December 3, 2018. The 9-episode second season premiered on August 23, 2019. The main cast and staff members reprised their roles.

Hero Mask was released in North America by Sentai Filmworks.

=== Manga ===
The manga Hero Mask: A lost memory was first serialized in Japan on July 7, 2020, with new chapters made every week. Serialization was completed on September 15, 2020.

It was published in paperback in Japan on March 15, 2021.

== Episodes ==
Series overview
Season	Episodes	Originally released
1	15	December 3, 2018
2	9	August 23, 2019

=== Season 1 (2018) ===
No. overall	No. in season	Title	Directed by	Written by	Original release date
1	1	"Episode 01"	Hiroyasu Aoki	Hiroyasu Aoki	December 3, 2018
2	2	"Episode 02"	Hiroyasu Aoki	Hiroyasu Aoki	December 3, 2018
3	3	"Episode 03"	Hiroyasu Aoki	Hiroyasu Aoki	December 3, 2018
4	4	"Episode 04"	Hiroyasu Aoki	Hiroyasu Aoki	December 3, 2018
5	5	"Episode 05"	Hiroyasu Aoki	Hiroyasu Aoki	December 3, 2018
6	6	"Episode 06"	Hiroyasu Aoki	Hiroyasu Aoki	December 3, 2018
7	7	"Episode 07"	Hiroyasu Aoki	Hiroyasu Aoki	December 3, 2018
8	8	"Episode 08"	Hiroyasu Aoki	Hiroyasu Aoki	December 3, 2018
9	9	"Episode 09"	Hiroyasu Aoki	Hiroyasu Aoki	December 3, 2018
10	10	"Episode 10"	Hiroyasu Aoki	Hiroyasu Aoki	December 3, 2018
11	11	"Episode 11"	Hiroyasu Aoki	Hiroyasu Aoki	December 3, 2018
12	12	"Episode 12"	Hiroyasu Aoki	Hiroyasu Aoki	December 3, 2018
13	13	"Episode 13"	Hiroyasu Aoki	Hiroyasu Aoki	December 3, 2018
14	14	"Episode 14"	Hiroyasu Aoki	Hiroyasu Aoki	December 3, 2018
15	15	"Episode 15"	Hiroyasu Aoki	Hiroyasu Aoki	December 3, 2018

=== Season 2 (2019) ===
No. overall	No. in season	Title	Directed by	Written by	Original release date
16	1	"Episode 16"	Hiroyasu Aoki	Hiroyasu Aoki	August 23, 2019
17	2	"Episode 17"	Hiroyasu Aoki	Hiroyasu Aoki	August 23, 2019
18	3	"Episode 18"	Hiroyasu Aoki	Hiroyasu Aoki	August 23, 2019
19	4	"Episode 19"	Hiroyasu Aoki	Hiroyasu Aoki	August 23, 2019
20	5	"Episode 20"	Hiroyasu Aoki	Hiroyasu Aoki	August 23, 2019
21	6	"Episode 21"	Hiroyasu Aoki	Hiroyasu Aoki	August 23, 2019
22	7	"Episode 22"	Hiroyasu Aoki	Hiroyasu Aoki	August 23, 2019
23	8	"Episode 23"	Hiroyasu Aoki	Hiroyasu Aoki	August 23, 2019
24	9	"Episode 24"	Hiroyasu Aoki	Hiroyasu Aoki	August 23, 2019
