= Croket! =

Japanese television series

- Cover of the first manga volume

コロッケ! (Korokke)
- Manga
- Written by: Manavu Kashimoto
- Published by: Shogakukan
- Magazine: CoroCoro
- Original run: April 2001 – November 2006
- Volumes: 15
- Anime television series
- Directed by: Naohito Takahashi
- Studio: OLM
- Licensed by: US: Viz Media
- Original network: TV Tokyo
- Original run: April 7, 2003 – March 27, 2005
- Episodes: 104
- Manga

Croket! Black Label
- Written by: Manavu Kashimoto
- Published by: Shogakukan
- Magazine: CoroCoro Aniki (2018-2021); CoroCoro Online (2021-2025)
- Original run: 2018 – 2025

Croket! (コロッケ!, Korokke!; lit. 'Croquette!'), also spelled Korokke!, is a Japanese manga written and illustrated by Manavu Kashimoto. It was published by Shogakukan in CoroCoro Comic from April 2001 to November 2006 and collected in 15 bound volumes. It received the 2003 Shogakukan Manga Award for children's manga.

Croket! was adapted into an anime television series by OLM, broadcast from April 7, 2003, to March 27, 2005, and had a total of 8 video games.

== Plot ==
The world of Croket! is one inhabited by both humans and exotic creatures such as anthropomorphic animals and where individuals called Bankers travel around the world to collect magical coins called Kinkas with their Kinka Banks. Kinkas are said to activate the appearance of the Bank Wizard, who will grant the wish of any Banker who collects enough Kinkas. The story mainly revolves around Croket, a young and scrappy Banker with incredible strength whose wish is to revive his father, a legendary Banker named Burger, who was said to be killed by a villain Croket knows as the "Black Gown Man."

Shortly after his journey, a tournament called the Banker Survival Quest is told to be held in the small but dangerous Macadamia Island, and the winner earns enough Kinkas to fill the largest Kinka Bank. Setting his eyes on the island, Croket battles against rivals both friendly and malevolent, though there very well may be a dangerous threat in the tournament that haunts fellow competitors and Croket's past.

== Characters ==
Croket (コロッケ, Kurokke)
The son of the Legendary Banker Burger and main character of the series. He is very strong and carries a heavy hammer as a weapon. His wish is to revive his father.
Risotto (リゾット)
Prince of Grand Chef Kingdom.
Pudding Pudding (プリンプリン, Purinpurin)
From a village witch everyone is beautiful, he carries a mask and uses a stick which invokes pink poop.
Menchi (メンチ)
Croket's pig shaped Kinkas safe.
Worcester
An anthropomorphic cat Banker who wants to be the most popular of his village.

== Games ==
All Croket! video games were published by Konami and none of them was released outside Japan.

Title	System	Developer	Release date	Japanese
Croket! Yume no Banker Survival!	Game Boy Advance		October 17, 2002	コロッケ！ 夢のバンカーサバイバル
Croket! Kindan no Kinka Box	PlayStation		March 20, 2003	コロッケ！ 禁断の禁貨ボックス！
Croket! 2: Yami no Bank to Ban Joou	Game Boy Advance		July 17, 2003	コロッケ！2闇のバンクとバン女王
Croket! 3: Granyuu Oukoku no Nazo	Game Boy Advance		December 11, 2003	コロッケ！3グラニュー王国の謎
Croket! Ban-Ō no Kiki o Sukue	PlayStation 2, GameCube		July 8, 2004	コロッケ！ バン王の危機を救え
Croket! 4: Bank no Mori no Mamorigami	Game Boy Advance		July 22, 2004	コロッケ！4バンクの森の守護神
Croket! Great Jikuu no Boukensha	Game Boy Advance	Jupiter	December 9, 2004	コロッケ！Great 時空の冒険者
Croket! DS Tenku no Yushatachi	Nintendo DS	Jupiter	December 15, 2005	コロッケ！DS天空の勇者た
