= Short Peace =

2013 multimedia project

ショート・ピース (Shōto Pīsu)
- Anime film

Possessions
- Directed by: Shuhei Morita
- Produced by: Yoshimasa Tsuchiya; Motoki Mukaichi; Daisuke Uchiyama
- Written by: Shuhei Morita
- Music by: Reiji Kitazato
- Studio: Sunrise
- Licensed by: AUS: Hanabee; NA: Sentai Filmworks
- Released: July 20, 2013
- Runtime: 14 minutes
- Anime film

Combustible
- Directed by: Katsuhiro Otomo
- Produced by: Yoshimasa Tsuchiya; Motoki Mukaichi; Daisuke Uchiyama
- Written by: Katsuhiro Otomo
- Music by: Makoto Kubota
- Studio: Sunrise
- Licensed by: AUS: Hanabee; NA: Sentai Filmworks
- Released: July 20, 2013
- Runtime: 13 minutes
- Anime film

Gambo
- Directed by: Hiroaki Ando
- Produced by: Katsumi Koike; Yoshimasa Tsuchiya; Motoki Mukaichi; Daisuke Uchiyama
- Written by: Katsuhito Ishii
- Music by: Hikaru Nanase
- Studio: Sunrise
- Licensed by: AUS: Hanabee; NA: Sentai Filmworks
- Released: July 20, 2013
- Runtime: 13 minutes
- Anime film

A Farewell to Weapons
- Directed by: Hajime Katoki
- Produced by: Katsumi Koike; Yoshimasa Tsuchiya; Motoki Mukaichi; Daisuke Uchiyama
- Written by: Hajime Katoki
- Music by: Tomohisa Ishikawa
- Studio: Sunrise
- Licensed by: AUS: Hanabee; NA: Sentai Filmworks
- Released: July 20, 2013
- Runtime: 26 minutes
- Video game

Ranko Tsukigime's Longest Day
- Developer: Crispy's!; Grasshopper Manufacture
- Publisher: Bandai Namco Games
- Directed by: Yohei Kataoka
- Produced by: Kazuyuki Kamagai; Takayuki Sasaki; Naoto Tani
- Designed by: Yohei Kataoka; Tetsuya Yoshinaga
- Music by: Akira Yamaoka
- Genre: Action-adventure, platformer
- Engine: Unity
- Platform: PlayStation 3
- Released: JP: January 16, 2014; EU: April 18, 2014; NA: September 30, 2014

Short Peace (Japanese: ショート・ピース, Hepburn: Shōto Pīsu) is a multimedia project composed of four short anime films produced by Sunrise and Shochiku, and a video game developed by Crispy's! and Grasshopper Manufacture. The four films were released in Japanese theaters on July 20, 2013, and were screened in North America during April 2014. Sentai Filmworks have licensed the films for North America. The film is taken from the eponymous manga written in 1976 by Katsuhiro Otomo. The video game was released in January 2014 in Japan, April 2014 in Europe, and September 2014 in North America. The game's physical releases in Japan and Europe includes the four animated shorts as a bonus.

== Short films ==
The opening sequence depicts a young girl following a white rabbit through different magical worlds. It was created by Koji Morimoto. It is then followed by four short films:

=== Possessions ===
九十九 (Tsukumo)
A lone traveler is caught in a storm, and finds an abandoned shrine when his hat is blown away. He takes refuge inside, where he discovers a small altar and some old offerings. Falling asleep, he wakes to find himself in a small room, surrounded by painted sliding screens. Unusual spirits begin to come through the walls. The traveler opens the portable cabinet he was carrying, revealing an assortment of tailoring tools. He proceeds to repair items for the spirits, who appear satisfied. At the end, he forces open a final screen door, causing a mountain of old items to fall on him. The items assemble themselves into the shape of a monster, emitting a foul odor. The monster charges at the traveler, who shuts his eyes and presses his hands together, causing the old items to fly past him. Upon opening his eyes, he discovers that he has returned to the abandoned shrine, and that the sun has risen. Standing up, the traveler notices old talismans plastered on the walls of the shrine. As he steps outside, he notices that his hat, along with several items he repaired for the spirits, have been left outside for his taking.

Directed by Shuhei Morita, it was nominated for an Oscar for Best Animated Short Film.

=== Combustible ===
火要鎮 (Hi no Yōjin)

Set in the Edo period, Owaka, a young aristocratic woman, is set to be engaged to a wealthy suitor. However, her true love lay with her childhood friend Matsukichi, a handsome and rebellious young man from next door. Three days before her wedding, Owaka is in her room, looking over wedding gifts, as well as a splendid kimono, hanging on a rack. In her despair, she throws a folded fan across the room, where it lands inside a standing lamp. The fan catches fire, and the flames begin spreading across the doors. Owaka cries for help, but decides to shut herself in her room after taking a long look at the splendid kimono. The fire spreads through the building, and quickly engulfs the entire neighborhood. Firefighters, among them Matsukichi, rush to the scene, and begin demolishing surrounding buildings in an attempt to confine the conflagration. Matsukichi sees Owaka standing on top of a roof, covering herself with the splendid kimono. He calls out to her, warning her not to climb a nearby tower. But, surrounded by fire, Owaka had no choice, and climbs it anyway. The fire reaches her, and the tower goes up in a burst of flame. The splendid kimono is sent flying into the sky, still burning.

Directed by Katsuhiro Otomo and based on his 1995 manga of the same name.

=== Gambo ===
An injured Christian samurai looks up at Gambo, a mysterious polar bear, who walks away without killing him. Soon after, Gambo sees a streak of fire descend from the sky. In a nearby village, several people are praying and caring for a giant, red monstrous humanoid alien that resembles an oni, a Japanese ogre. It is unconscious on the floor, wearing a loincloth and broken restraints on its wrists and neck. The village chief says that a young girl is offered to the ogre every night, so it will not attack the village, since the villagers' guns are ineffective against it. The ogre awakens, and kills the villagers tending over him. Distraught, the village chief begs the Christian samurai to hunt down and kill the ogre, before it returns to claim the emperor's daughter, the last girl in the village.

The emperor's daughter runs off into the forest, where she encounters Gambo, who seems to understand the young girl's thoughts. Sensing her desperation, Gambo sets off to confront the red ogre. He arrives at the site of a strange ruin, where a large half organic, half metallic craft lies smoldering amidst animal carcasses and yellow slime. Gambo enters the craft, and finds a human woman bound to a cybernetic alcove, unnaturally pregnant with several ogre-like fetuses. In a rage, Gambo rips apart the inside of the structure, causing explosions that destroy the entire craft. The ogre returns, and upon seeing his wrecked vessel, attacks Gambo in a fit of fury. The two fight, but the ogre is much stronger. Having followed the bear, the Christian samurai intervenes in their fight. Believing the ogre to be a demon, he drives a spear into its back, and slashes at it with his sword, but does little damage against its massive body. The emperor's daughter leaps out from her hiding spot, catching the ogre's attention, who runs towards her. Before he can get to her, Gambo attacks the ogre from behind, and the two wrestle on the ground. Shogunate soldiers show up, attacking the ogre with rifles and arrows, to no avail. With his remaining strength, Gambo lifts the ogre up into the air, gripping its middle in a tight hold as his claws sank into the ogre's abdomen, eviscerating and killing it. Gambo falls to the ground, and dies from his injuries. The camera pans out, showing a path of destroyed trees where the ogre's spacecraft had crashed into the mountain.

Directed by Hiroaki Ando.

=== A Farewell to Weapons ===
武器よさらば (Buki yo Saraba)
A tour-de-force saga of men battling robotic tanks in apocalyptic Tokyo during a Third World War.

Directed by Hajime Katoki and based on Katsuhiro Otomo's 1981 manga of the same name.

== Video game ==
Short Peace: Ranko Tsukigime's Longest Day, known in Japan as Short Peace: Tsukigime Ranko no Ichiban Nagai Hi, (Note: Japanese: ショートピース 月極蘭子のいちばん長い日) is a side-scrolling platform game directed by Yohei Kataoka and published by Bandai Namco Games for the PlayStation 3. The game's story was written by Goichi Suda. The game follows the titular heroine, a schoolgirl-assassin who is tasked with killing her own father.

The game puts players in the role of the eponymous Ranko Tsukigime, as she races through levels attempting to outrun a wave of spirits chasing after her. Ranko's basic maneuverability allows her to jump, hover across long gaps, slide under obstacles, and jump off walls. Ranko also has a melee attack which can destroy enemies, as well as reflect enemy fire. By destroying enemies, the player can trigger chain reactions which may automatically destroy other nearby enemies. Along with some areas requiring the players to defeat all enemies in an area to progress, defeating enemies helps fuel ammunition for a fire-arm which can be used to push back the pursuing spirits in case they get too close.

== Concept ==
The idea behind the Short Peace was of a hybrid project composed of the four anime shorts and one video game. The overarching theme of the project is Japan, with each entry representing a different setting within the country's history. Because the modern era had not been represented in the anime, the team decided to represent it using the video game. The decision to bring both the four anime as well as the game to the west was made early in production.

== Reception ==
Combustible won the Grand Prize at the 16th Japan Media Arts Festival and the Ōfuji Noburō Award at the 2012 Mainichi Film Awards.

Tsukumo, under the title Possessions, was nominated for Best Animated Short at the 86th Academy Awards.

The film grossed US$622,049 by August 4.

== See also ==
- Neo Tokyo
- Robot Carnival
- Memories
