= Tasuke, the Samurai Cop =

Manga and television anime

江戸っ子ボーイがってん太助 (Edokko Bōi Gatten Tasuke)
- Genre: Adventure, Comedy
- Manga
- Written by: Manavu Kashimoto
- Published by: Shogakukan
- Imprint: Ladybug Comics
- Magazine: Monthly CoroCoro Comic
- Original run: 1990 – 1991
- Volumes: 3
- Anime television series
- Directed by: Takeshi Mori
- Produced by: Minoru Ohno
- Written by: Narimitsu Taguchi
- Music by: Ryuichi Katsumata
- Studio: Studio Pierrot
- Original network: TXN (TV Tokyo)
- Original run: October 19, 1990 – March 22, 1991
- Episodes: 22

Tasuke, the Samurai Cop, known in Japanese as Edokko Boy Gatten Tasuke (江戸っ子ボーイがってん太助, Edokko Bōi Gatten Tasuke), is a manga series created by Manavu Kashimoto. It was adapted as an anime television series by Studio Pierrot broadcast in 22 episode on TV Tokyo (TX) from October 19, 1990, to March 22, 1991.

Tasuke, a student at the Metropolitan Police Academy, wishes to become a top police officer and defeat the criminals of Edo City.

== Characters ==
Tasuke (太助)

Voiced by: Yūko Mita

Omon-chan (おもんちゃん)

Voiced by: Chieko Honda

Darth Benkei (ダース弁慶 Dāsu Benkei)

Voiced by: Tesshō Genda

Kintaro Ninomiya (二宮金太郎 Ninomiya Kintarō)

Voiced by: Yuriko Fuchizaki

Ghengis Khan (ジンギス・ハーン Jingisu Hān)

Voiced by: Mitsuo Iwata

School Director ( ダイブツ先生 Daibutsu Sensei)

Voiced by: Kenichi Ogata
