= Kingdom season 1 =

First season of Kingdom anime television series

Kingdom
- Season 1
- Cover of the first DVD volume released by Avex Pictures.
- No. of episodes: 38

Release
- Original network: NHK BS Premium, NHK General TV
- Original release: June 4, 2012 – February 25, 2013

Season chronology
- Next → Season 2

Kingdom is an anime adaptation of a manga series of the same title written and illustrated by Yasuhisa Hara. It was produced by Pierrot, directed by Jun Kamiya, written by Naruhisa Arakawa, and featured music composed by Minako Seki. The series' characters were designed by Atsuo Tobe, Noriko Otake, and Masatoshi Hakanda. The series premiered from June 4, 2012, to February 25, 2013, and ran for 38 episodes. Funimation announced it acquired the exclusive streaming rights to the series and receive an English dub.

The opening theme is "Pride" by Nothing's Carved in Stone while the ending themes are "Voice of Soul" by Takumi Ishida, "Destiny Sky" by Yuki Wakai, and "Never Ending" by Dasoku.

== Episodes ==
No. overall	No. in season	Title	Directed by	Written by	Original release date
1	1	"The Nameless Boy"; Transliteration: "Mumei no shōnen" (Japanese: 無名の少年)	Jun Kamiya; Kiichi Takaoka	Naruhisa Arakawa	June 4, 2012
2	2	"An Encounter With Destiny"; Transliteration: "Unmei no deai" (Japanese: 運命の出会い)	Mitsutoshi Satō	Masahiko Shiraishi	June 11, 2012
3	3	"For a Friend"; Transliteration: "Tomo yo...!" (Japanese: 友よ…！)	Daisuke Tsukushi	Katsura Murayama	June 18, 2012
4	4	"The King and the Sword"; Transliteration: "Ō to ken" (Japanese: 王と剣)	Masahiro Takada	Tsuyoshi Tamai	June 25, 2012
5	5	"Unbroken Heart"; Transliteration: "Orenai kokoro" (Japanese: 折れない心)	Mitsutoshi Satō	Masaki Wachi	July 2, 2012
6	6	"The Path to Becoming a General"; Transliteration: "Taishōgun e no michi" (Japanese: 大将軍への道)	Kiichi Takaoka	Masahiko Shiraishi	July 9, 2012
7	7	"The Fearsome Folk of the Mountains"; Transliteration: "Osoroshiki yama no tami" (Japanese: 恐ろしき山の民)	Takenori Mihara	Katsura Murayama	July 16, 2012
8	8	"Everyone's Dream"; Transliteration: "Sorezore no yume" (Japanese: それぞれの夢)	Mitsutoshi Satō	Tsuyoshi Tamai	July 23, 2012
9	9	"On to Xianyang"; Transliteration: "Iza kanyō e" (Japanese: いざ咸陽へ)	Daisuke Tsukushi	Masaki Wachi	July 30, 2012
10	10	"Storming the Capital"; Transliteration: "Ōto totsunyū" (Japanese: 王都突入)	Atsushi Nakayama	Masahiko Shiraishi	August 6, 2012
11	11	"A Fierce Battle Begins"; Transliteration: "Gekisen kaishi" (Japanese: 激戦開始)	Kiichi Takaoka	Katsura Murayama	August 13, 2012
12	12	"The Ultimate Sword"; Transliteration: "Kyūkyoku no ittō" (Japanese: 究極の一刀)	Masahiro Takada	Tsuyoshi Tamai	August 20, 2012
13	13	"Lan Kai Roars"; Transliteration: "Rankai hoeru" (Japanese: ランカイ吠える)	Mitsutoshi Satō	Masaki Wachi	August 27, 2012
14	14	"The Strength of the Sword"; Transliteration: "Ken no chikara" (Japanese: 剣の力)	Daisuke Tsukushi	Masahiko Shiraishi	September 3, 2012
15	15	"The Qualities of a King"; Transliteration: "Ō no shikaku" (Japanese: 王の資格)	Kiichi Takaoka	Naruhisa Arakawa	September 10, 2012
16	16	"Lü Buwei"; Transliteration: "Ryofui" (Japanese: 呂不韋)	Masahiro Takada	Katsura Murayama	September 17, 2012
17	17	"First Campaign"; Transliteration: "Uijin" (Japanese: 初陣)	Mitsutoshi Satō	Tsuyoshi Tamai	September 24, 2012
18	18	"The Chariot Squadron's Menace"; Transliteration: "Senshatai no kyōi" (Japanese: 戦車隊の脅威)	Daisuke Tsukushi	Masaki Wachi	October 1, 2012
19	19	"Raging Battle"; Transliteration: "Rekka no tatakai" (Japanese: 烈火の戦い)	Shintarō Itoga	Masahiko Shiraishi	October 8, 2012
20	20	"Wang Yi Intrudes"; Transliteration: "Ōki ran'nyū" (Japanese: 王騎乱入)	Kiichi Takaoka	Katsura Murayama	October 15, 2012
21	21	"The Meaning of a General"; Transliteration: "Shōgun no imi" (Japanese: 将軍の意味)	Mitsutoshi Satō	Tsuyoshi Tamai	October 22, 2012
22	22	"The Brave General vs. The Skilled General"; Transliteration: "Mōshō tai chishō" (Japanese: 知将対猛将)	Masahiro Takada	Masaki Wachi	October 29, 2012
23	23	"An Evening Story"; Transliteration: "Yogatari" (Japanese: 夜語り)	Shū Watanabe	Naruhisa Arakawa	November 5, 2012
24	24	"A New Trial"; Transliteration: "Aratanaru shiren" (Japanese: 新たなる試練)	Shintarō Itoga	Masahiko Shiraishi	November 12, 2012
25	25	"Commission"; Transliteration: "Ninmei" (Japanese: 任命)	Daisuke Tsukushi	Katsura Murayama	November 19, 2012
26	26	"Pang Nuan, God of War"; Transliteration: "Bushin hōken" (Japanese: 武神 龐煖)	Kiichi Takaoka	Tsuyoshi Tamai	November 26, 2012
27	27	"The Fei Xin Force is Born"; Transliteration: "Hishintai tanjō" (Japanese: 飛信隊誕生)	Masahiro Takada	Masaki Wachi	December 3, 2012
28	28	"Wang Yi's Flying Arrow"; Transliteration: "Ōki no hiya" (Japanese: 王騎の飛矢)	Mitsutaka Noshitani	Masahiko Shiraishi	December 10, 2012
29	29	"The Tides of War Suddenly Turn"; Transliteration: "Senkyoku kyūten" (Japanese: 戦局急転)	Shigeki Kawai	Katsura Murayama	December 17, 2012
30	30	"An Act of God"; Transliteration: "Tensai" (Japanese: 天災)	Kiichi Takaoka	Naruhisa Arakawa	December 24, 2012
31	31	"The Power of Unity"; Transliteration: "Shū no chikara" (Japanese: 集の力)	Shintarō Itoga	Tsuyoshi Tamai	January 7, 2013
32	32	"The Fei Xin Force on the Run"; Transliteration: "Haisō no hishintai" (Japanese: 敗走の飛信隊)	Daisuke Tsukushi	Masaki Wachi	January 14, 2013
33	33	"Wang Yi Takes the Field"; Transliteration: "Ōki shutsujin!" (Japanese: 王騎 出陣！)	Mitsutoshi Satō	Masahiko Shiraishi	January 21, 2013
34	34	"The Main Attraction"; Transliteration: "Shin'uchi" (Japanese: 真打ち)	Mitsutaka Noshitani	Katsura Murayama	January 28, 2013
35	35	"Commanding Generals Face to Face"; Transliteration: "Sōdaishō mieru" (Japanese: 総大将 見える)	Kiichi Takaoka	Tsuyoshi Tamai	February 4, 2013
36	36	"Wang Yi and Liao"; Transliteration: "Ōki to Kyū" (Japanese: 王騎と摎)	Shintarō Itoga	Masaki Wachi	February 11, 2013
37	37	"I Stand on the Verge of Death"; Transliteration: "Ware, shisen ni ari" (Japanese: 我、死線にあり)	Mitsutoshi Satō	Masahiko Shiraishi	February 18, 2013
38	38	"Succession"; Transliteration: "Keishō" (Japanese: 継承)	Jun Kamiya; Kiichi Takaoka	Naruhisa Arakawa	February 25, 2013
