= Manavu Kashimoto =

Japanese manga artist

Manavu Kashimoto 樫本学ヴ
- Born: Manabu Kashimoto (樫本 学, Kashimoto Manabu); August 12, 1967 (age 59) Uwa, Ehime, Japan
- Area: Manga artist
- Notable works: Croket!, Tasuke, the Samurai Cop
- Awards: 2003 Shogakukan Manga Award children's category

Manavu Kashimoto (樫本 学ヴ, Kashimoto Manavu) is a Japanese manga artist.

Kashimoto is the creator of Tasuke, the Samurai Cop, Class King Yamazaki and Croket!. In 2003 he won the Shogakukan Manga Award for the children's category for Croket!.

== Works ==
Tasuke, the Samurai Cop ( 江戸っ子ボーイがってん太助) (October 1990-March 1991)

Storm J Boy Buttobi Fighter (嵐のJボーイ ぶっとび闘人) (April 1992-June 1995)

Class King Yamazaki (学級王ヤマザキ) (September 1995-February 2001)

Aboveboard Crocodile (超番ワニ) (February 2000-July 2001)

Croket! (コロッケ) (April 2001-November 2006)

I'm Galileo (ぼくはガリレオ) (January 2007-September 2010)

Kimeru's Y O Y O ! (キメルのYOYO！) (October 2010-March 2012)

Back Fist Tonma (手裏拳トンマ) (2016-2018)
