= Kingdom season 3 =

Third season of Kingdom anime television series

Kingdom
- Season 3
- Key Visual
- No. of episodes: 26

Release
- Original network: NHK BS Premium, NHK General TV
- Original release: April 6, 2020 – October 18, 2021

Season chronology
- ← Previous; Season 2 Next → Season 4

Kingdom is an anime adaptation of a manga series of the same title written and illustrated by Yasuhisa Hara. On December 15, 2019, it was announced that the series will receive a third season along with a new production staff. The season aired from April 6, 2020, to October 18, 2021. On March 30, 2020, Funimation announced that they will stream the third season in U.S., Canada, the U.K., and Ireland. On April 26, 2020, it was announced that after the fourth episode, the remaining episodes of the season would be delayed until further notice due to the effects of the COVID-19 pandemic. On October 5, 2020, it was announced that weekly new episodes would resume April 5, 2021, starting from episode 1. On August 13, 2022, Funimation announced at 11:30 am Pacific Time, that the third season of the series would receive an English dub for all 26 episodes.

The opening themes are "TOMORROW" and "STACKiNG" by BiSH while the ending themes are "Deep inside" by Waterweed, and "kIng" by Emiko Suzuki.

== Episodes ==
No. overall	No. in season	Title	Directed by	Written by	Original release date
78	1	"The Encroaching Coalition Army"; Transliteration: "Semari Kuru Gasshō-gun" (Japanese: 迫り来る合従軍)	Kazuya Monma	Noboru Takagi	April 6, 2020
79	2	"A Coming Together"; Transliteration: "Ichidō ni Kaisu" (Japanese: 一堂に会す)	Kiyomitsu Satō	Jun'ichi Miyashita	April 13, 2020
80	3	"The Battle of Hangu Pass"; Transliteration: "Kankoku-kan Kōbō-sen" (Japanese: 函谷関攻防戦)	Taiji Kawanishi	Shingo Irie	April 20, 2020
81	4	"Two Battlefields"; Transliteration: "Futatsu no Senjō" (Japanese: 二つの戦場)	Yasuhiro Geshi	Suzuyuki Kaneko	April 27, 2020
82	5	"Rise of a Young General"; Transliteration: "Wakaki Shō no Taitō" (Japanese: 若き将の台頭)	Masahiro Takada	Daishirō Tanimura	May 3, 2021
83	6	"A Mutual Self-Confidence"; Transliteration: "Tagai no Jifu" (Japanese: 互いの自負)	Ryūta Yamamoto	Noboru Takagi	May 10, 2021
84	7	"A Wasteland Riddled with Holes"; Transliteration: "Ana-darake no Kōya" (Japanese: 穴だらけの荒野)	Taiji Kawanishi	Jun'ichi Miyashita	May 17, 2021
85	8	"Wa Lin: A Spirited Woman"; Transliteration: "Joketsu Ka Rin" (Japanese: 女傑・媧燐)	Kiyomitsu Satō	Shingo Irie	May 24, 2021
86	9	"Meng Wu's Proclamation"; Transliteration: "Mō Bu no Geki" (Japanese: 蒙武の檄)	Taiji Kawanishi	Daishirō Tanimura	May 31, 2021
87	10	"A Promotion in a Predicament"; Transliteration: "Kyūchi no Dai Batteki" (Japanese: 窮地の大抜擢)	Yasuhiro Geshi	Suzuyuki Kaneko	June 7, 2021
88	11	"A General's Pride"; Transliteration: "Bushō no Kyōji" (Japanese: 武将の矜持)	Harume Kosaka	Jun'ichi Miyashita	June 14, 2021
89	12	"The Wa Lin Army's Charge"; Transliteration: "Ka Rin-gun no Totsugeki" (Japanese: 媧燐軍の突撃)	Masahiro Takada	Shingo Irie	June 21, 2021
90	13	"The Strongest"; Transliteration: "Shikyō" (Japanese: 至強)	Takaaki Wada	Daishirō Tanimura	June 28, 2021
91	14	"The Mightiest Man"; Transliteration: "Saikyō no Otoko" (Japanese: 最強の漢)	Kazuya Monma	Aya Yoshinaga	July 19, 2021
92	15	"Beyond Hangu Pass"; Transliteration: "Kankoku-kan no Ura" (Japanese: 函谷関の裏)	Taiji Kawanishi	Jun'ichi Miyashita	July 26, 2021
93	16	"Li Mu's Whereabouts"; Transliteration: "Ri Boku no Yukue" (Japanese: 李牧の行方)	Yasuhiro Geshi	Suzuyuki Kaneko	August 2, 2021
94	17	"The Ultimate Instinctive Type"; Transliteration: "Honnō-gata no Kiwami" (Japanese: 本能型の極み)	Kiyomitsu Satō	Shingo Irie	August 16, 2021 (Note: This episode was originally scheduled to air on August 9, 2021, but has been postponed by a week due to typhoon news coverage on NHK General TV.)
95	18	"Zheng's Decision"; Transliteration: "Sei no Ketsudan" (Japanese: 政の決断)	Harume Kosaka	Daishirō Tanimura	August 23, 2021
96	19	"Zheng Speaks"; Transliteration: "Sei, Katarikakeru" (Japanese: 政、語りかける)	Taiji Kawanishi	Aya Yoshinaga	August 30, 2021
97	20	"The First Night"; Transliteration: "Saisho no Yoru" (Japanese: 最初の夜)	Takaaki Wada	Jun'ichi Miyashita	September 6, 2021
98	21	"A Secret Revealed"; Transliteration: "Himitsu no Roken" (Japanese: 秘密の露見)	Ayaka Tsujihashi	Noboru Takagi	September 13, 2021
99	22	"With All We Have"; Transliteration: "Dashi Tsukusu" (Japanese: 出し尽くす)	Masayuki Iimura	Suzuyuki Kaneko	September 20, 2021
100	23	"Unprecedented Aid"; Transliteration: "Hakaku no Kasei" (Japanese: 破格の加勢)	Taiji Kawanishi	Shingo Irie	September 27, 2021
101	24	"Deepest Gratitude"; Transliteration: "Shinsha" (Japanese: 深謝)	Yasuhiro Geshi	Daishirō Tanimura	October 4, 2021
102	25	"The Difference Between Dances"; Transliteration: "Mibu no Chigai" (Japanese: 巫舞の違い)	Kazuya Monma	Noboru Takagi	October 11, 2021
103	26	"Another Path"; Transliteration: "Betsu no Michi" (Japanese: 別の道)	Kiyomitsu Satō	Noboru Takagi	October 18, 2021
