= Kingdom season 2 =

Second season of Kingdom anime television series

Kingdom
- Season 2
- Cover of the nineteenth DVD volume released by Avex Pictures.
- No. of episodes: 39

Release
- Original network: NHK BS Premium, NHK General TV
- Original release: June 8, 2013 – March 1, 2014

Season chronology
- ← Previous; Season 1 Next → Season 3

Kingdom is an anime adaptation of a manga series of the same title written and illustrated by Yasuhisa Hara. A second season was announced on January 23, 2013, and aired from June 8, 2013, to March 1, 2014. The season featured returning staff Minako Seki and Naruhisa Arakawa, the first season's composer and writer, respectively. Akira Iwanaga replaced Jun Kamiya as director, Izumi Nakazawa served as series producer, and the character designs were handled by Itsuko Takeda, Kumiko Tokunaga, and Makoto Shimojima. On December 16, 2020, Funimation announced that the second season of the series would receive an English dub.

The opening theme is "Glory Days" by D-Date while the ending themes are "21" by The Sketchbook, "EXIT" by The Sketchbook, and "Soko ni Kimi ga Aru" by The Sketchbook

== Episodes ==
No. overall	No. in season	Title	Directed by	Written by	Original release date
39	1	"New Era"; Transliteration: "Shin Jidai" (Japanese: 新時代)	Akira Iwanaga	Naruhisa Arakawa	June 8, 2013
40	2	"A Quiet Battlefield"; Transliteration: "Shizukanaru Senjō" (Japanese: 静かなる戦場)	Toshinori Fukushima	Masahiko Shiraishi	June 15, 2013
41	3	"A Tumultuous Banquet"; Transliteration: "Arashi no Shukuen" (Japanese: 嵐の祝宴)	Mitsutaka Noshitani	Masaki Wachi	June 22, 2013
42	4	"Kings and Ants"; Transliteration: "Ō to Ari" (Japanese: 王と蟻)	Mitsutoshi Satō	Tsuyoshi Tamai	June 29, 2013
43	5	"A Third Force"; Transliteration: "Dai San Seiryoku" (Japanese: 第三勢力)	Kazunobu Fuseki	Katsura Murayama	July 6, 2013
44	6	"Beautiful Venom"; Transliteration: "Utsukushiki Mōdoku" (Japanese: 美しき猛毒)	Tōru Ishida	Naruhisa Arakawa	July 13, 2013
45	7	"A Cursed Prince"; Transliteration: "Norowareta Ōji" (Japanese: 呪われた王子)	Daisuke Tsukushi	Masahiko Shiraishi	July 20, 2013
46	8	"Zheng and Zi Xia"; Transliteration: "Sei to Shika" (Japanese: 政と紫夏)	Naoki Horiuchi	Masaki Wachi	July 27, 2013
47	9	"Binding Wish"; Transliteration: "Tsunagu Negai" (Japanese: つなぐ願い)	Mitsutaka Noshitani	Tsuyoshi Tamai	August 3, 2013
48	10	"Broken Love"; Transliteration: "Kudaketa Ai" (Japanese: 砕けた愛)	Kazunobu Fuseki	Katsura Murayama	August 10, 2013
49	11	"Assemblage"; Transliteration: "Soroibumi" (Japanese: 揃い踏み)	Mitsutoshi Satō	Naruhisa Arakawa	August 17, 2013
50	12	"Siege of Gaolang Castle"; Transliteration: "Kōrō-jō Kōryaku" (Japanese: 高狼城攻略)	Norihiko Nagahama	Masahiko Shiraishi	August 24, 2013
51	13	"My Way of Fighting"; Transliteration: "Ore no Yarikata" (Japanese: 俺の戦り方)	Seimei Kidokoro	Masaki Wachi	August 31, 2013
52	14	"The Man, Lian Po"; Transliteration: "Sono Otoko, Renba" (Japanese: その男、廉頗)	Yūsuke Onoda	Tsuyoshi Tamai	September 7, 2013
53	15	"Air of a Military Commander"; Transliteration: "Bushō no Kūki" (Japanese: 武将の空気)	Hiromichi Matano	Katsura Murayama	September 14, 2013
54	16	"Midnight Great General"; Transliteration: "Mayonaka no Taishōgun" (Japanese: 真夜中の大将軍)	Daisuke Tsukushi	Masahiko Shiraishi	September 21, 2013
55	17	"The Night before the Start of War"; Transliteration: "Kaisen Zen'ya" (Japanese: 開戦前夜)	Kazunobu Fuseki	Tsuyoshi Tamai	September 28, 2013
56	18	"Clash!"; Transliteration: "Gekitotsu!" (Japanese: 激突！)	Mitsutaka Noshitani	Katsura Murayama	October 6, 2013
57	19	"Xuan Feng's Scheme"; Transliteration: "Genpō no Kisaku" (Japanese: 玄峰の奇策)	Norihiko Nagahama	Masaki Wachi	October 13, 2013
58	20	"The Feixin Unit's Counterattack"; Transliteration: "Hishintai Gyakushū" (Japanese: 飛信隊逆襲)	Kanji Abe	Masaki Wachi	October 20, 2013
59	21	"The Thief vs. The Strategist"; Transliteration: "Tōzoku Tai Gunryakuka" (Japanese: 盗賊対軍略家)	Mitsutoshi Satō	Masahiko Shiraishi	October 27, 2013
60	22	"Meng Tian's Proposal"; Transliteration: "Mōten no Teian" (Japanese: 蒙恬の提案)	Hiromichi Matano	Katsura Murayama	November 3, 2013
61	23	"United Front of Three Units"; Transliteration: "Santai Kyōtō" (Japanese: 三隊共闘)	Yūsuke Onoda	Tsuyoshi Tamai	November 10, 2013
62	24	"A Wall That Must be Overcome"; Transliteration: "Koeru beki Kabe" (Japanese: 越えるべき壁)	Kiyoshi Murayama	Masahiko Shiraishi	November 17, 2013
63	25	"Double Bluff"; Transliteration: "Ura no Ura" (Japanese: 裏の裏)	Mitsutoshi Satō	Katsura Murayama	November 24, 2013
64	26	"The Caliber of a General"; Transliteration: "Shō no Utsuwa" (Japanese: 将の器)	Mitsutaka Noshitani	Masaki Wachi	December 1, 2013
65	27	"The Hour of Conclusion"; Transliteration: "Ketchaku no Toki" (Japanese: 決着の刻)	Norihiko Nagahama	Masahiko Shiraishi	December 8, 2013
66	28	"The Final Plan"; Transliteration: "Saigo no Saku" (Japanese: 最後の策)	Norihiko Nagahama	Masaki Wachi	December 15, 2013
67	29	"A Single Moment"; Transliteration: "Isshun" (Japanese: 一瞬)	Yūsuke Onoda	Katsura Murayama	December 22, 2013
68	30	"Precious Comrades"; Transliteration: "Daiji na Nakama" (Japanese: 大事な仲間)	Mitsutoshi Satō	Tsuyoshi Tamai	December 29, 2013
69	31	"Meng Ao, Standing Firm"; Transliteration: "Mōgō, hikazu" (Japanese: 蒙驁、退かず)	Kiyoshi Murayama	Masahiko Shiraishi	January 5, 2014
70	32	"Unfading Era"; Transliteration: "Iroasenu Jidai" (Japanese: 色あせぬ時代)	Yoshinori Odaka	Masaki Wachi	January 12, 2014
71	33	"Victory... And..."; Transliteration: "Shōri… Soshite" (Japanese: 勝利…そして)	Hiroaki Nishimura	Naruhisa Arakawa	January 19, 2014
72	34	"The Strategist Arrives"; Transliteration: "Gunshi no Tōchaku" (Japanese: 軍師の到着)	Mitsutaka Noshitani	Tsuyoshi Tamai	January 26, 2014
73	35	"Trial and Resolve"; Transliteration: "Shiren to Kakugo" (Japanese: 試練と覚悟)	Norihiko Nagahama	Naruhisa Arakawa	February 2, 2014
74	36	"Outwit"; Transliteration: "Ue o Iku" (Japanese: 上を行く)	Tōru Ishida	Naruhisa Arakawa	February 9, 2014
75	37	"Distant Thunder"; Transliteration: "Enrai" (Japanese: 遠雷)	Yoshinori Odaka	Masaki Wachi	February 16, 2014
76	38	"Stage of Strategy"; Transliteration: "Bōryaku no Butai" (Japanese: 謀略の舞台)	Mitsutoshi Satō	Katsura Murayama	February 23, 2014
77	39	"A New Legend"; Transliteration: "Aratanaru Densetsu" (Japanese: 新たなる伝説)	Toshinori Fukushima	Masahiko Shiraishi	March 1, 2014
