= Shuhei Morita =

Japanese anime filmmaker, screenwriter, and producer

Shūhei Morita
- Born: June 22, 1978 (age 48); Yamatotakada, Nara, Japan
- Occupations: Film director, screenwriter

Shūhei Morita (Japanese: 森田 修平, Hepburn: Morita Shūhei); born June 22, 1978) is a Japanese anime filmmaker, screenwriter, and producer. He is known for directing the critically successful 2013 film Possessions for which Morita was nominated for the Academy Award for Best Animated Short Film, as well as the 2014 anime series Tokyo Ghoul for its first and second seasons.

== Notable works ==
=== TV productions ===
- Valvrave the Liberator (2013; Storyboard (Ep. 5)
- Gatchaman Crowds (2013; CGI Director)
- Tokyo Ghoul (2014; Director)
- Tokyo Ghoul √A (2015; Director)

=== OVA ===
- Freedom (2006; Director, CG, Storyboard (Ep. 4)
- Coicent (2010, Director, Script)
- Votoms Finder (2010; CG supervision)
- Chō Kidō Gaiku KASHIWA-NO-HA (2015; Director, Supervisor manga adaptation)

=== Films ===
- Kakurenbo: Hide & Seek (2005; Director, Scenario, Storyboard, Original story, Producer, CG, Editing)
- A Farewell to Arms (2013; Unit Director)
- Possessions (2013, Director, Screenplay)
- Edge of Time (2025; Director, segment "Tsuru no Mai")
