= Toei Animation =

Japanese animation studio

Toei Animation Co., Ltd.
- Logo used since 1999

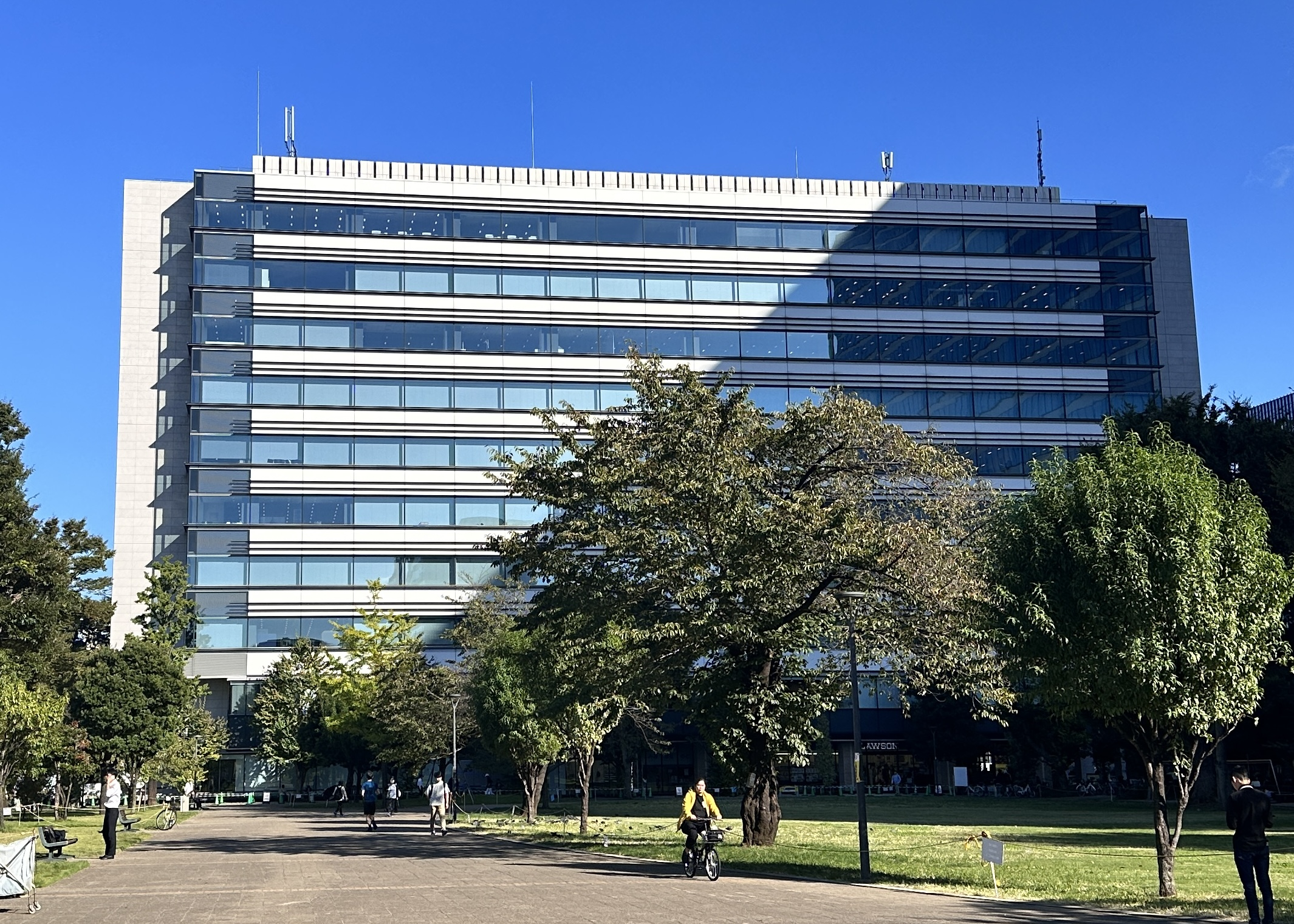
- Headquarters in Nakano, Tokyo
- Native name: 東映アニメーション株式会社 (Note: Previously spelled as 東映動画株式会社 (Tōei Dōga Kabushiki-gaisha) from 1956 to 1998.)
- Romanized name: Tōei Animēshon Kabushiki-gaisha
- Formerly: Nihon Dōga Co., Ltd. (1948–1952); Nichido Eiga Co. (1952–1956)
- Type: Public
- Traded as: TYO: 4816
- Industry: Animation studio; Character licensing
- Founded: January 23, 1948; 78 years ago (as Nihon Dōga Co., Ltd.); July 31, 1956; 70 years ago (as Toei Animation)
- Founder: Kenzō Masaoka; Sanae Yamamoto
- Headquarters: Nakano, Nakano, Tokyo (Note: Headquarters), Japan
- Number of locations: Higashi-Ōizumi, Nerima, Tokyo (Note: Studio), Japan
- Area served: Worldwide
- Key people: Kozo Morishita (chairman); Katsuhiro Takagi (president)
- Operating income: ▼US$134.69 million (2021)
- Owners: Toei Company, Ltd. (34.2%); TV Asahi Corporation (20.0%); Toei Video (3.2%); Fuji Media Holdings (3.19%); Bandai Namco Holdings (2.7%); Toei Labo Tech (2.5%)
- Number of employees: 960 (March 2025)
- Subsidiaries: TAVAC; Toei Animation Music Publishing; Toei Animation Phils.; Toei Animation Inc.; Toei Animation Europe; Toei Animation Enterprises; Toei Animation (Shanghai)
- Website: toei-anim.co.jp; corp.toei-anim.co.jp

Toei Animation Co., Ltd. (Japanese: 東映アニメーション株式会社, Hepburn: Tōei Animēshon Kabushiki-gaisha; /ˈtoʊ.eɪ/) is a Japanese animation studio primarily controlled by its namesake Toei Company. It was originally founded on January 23, 1948, as Nihon Dōga by Kenzō Masaoka and Sanae Yamamoto.

The studio is known for producing numerous series, including the Sally the Witch series, the GeGeGe no Kitarō series, Mazinger Z, Galaxy Express 999, the Cutie Honey series, the Dr. Slump series, the Dragon Ball series, the Saint Seiya series, the Sailor Moon series, Slam Dunk, the Digimon series, the One Piece series, Magical Doremi, Toriko, World Trigger and the Pretty Cure series, among others. Aside from animation production, the company handles character licensing and overseas distribution and sales of its titles through its wholly-owned international subsidiaries.

Toei Animation is headquartered in Nakano, Tokyo with its studios in Higashi-Ōizumi, Nerima which also houses the Toei Animation Museum. Toei also has an overseas studio in the Philippines known as Toei Animation Phils.

Pero, the protagonist of the studio's 1969 film adaptation of Puss in Boots, serves as its mascot.

== History ==
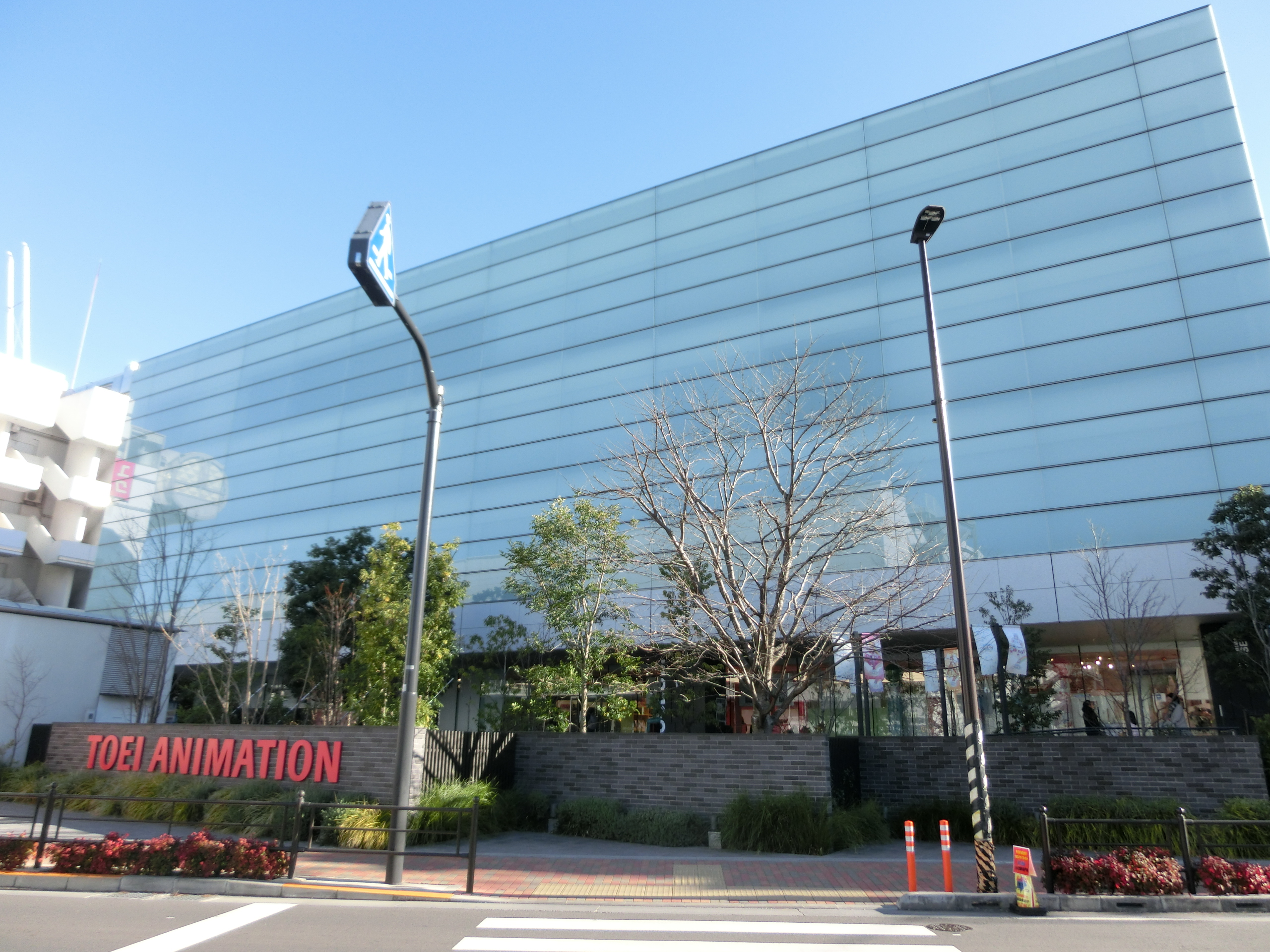
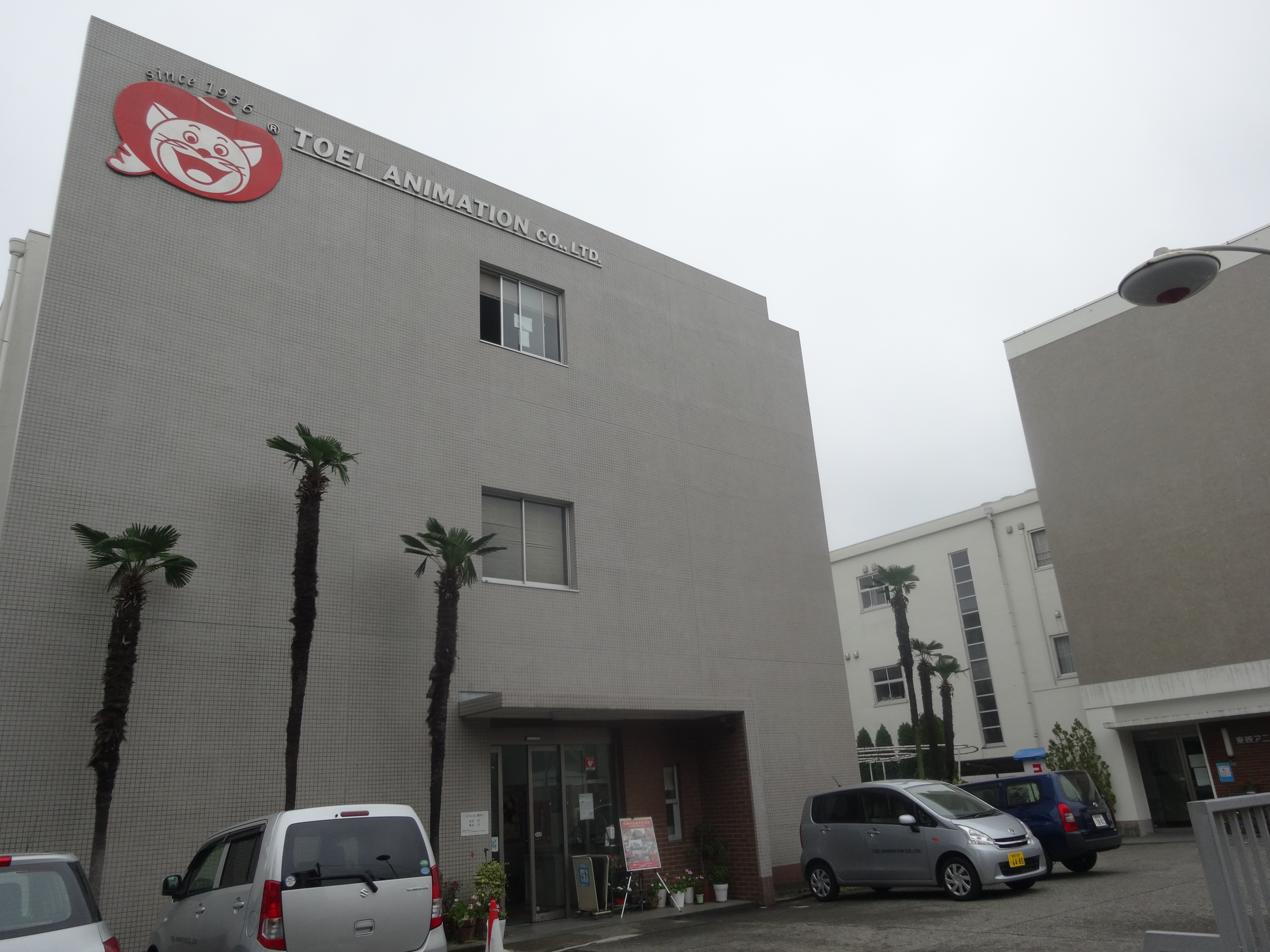
Studio building in Nerima, Tokyo with the Toei Animation Museum on the ground level. The original 1956 building, after its 1964 expansion (pictured below) was demolished in 2014 to make room for a larger studio with the Toei Animation Gallery being rebranded to the Toei Animation Museum in the process.

=== Early history ===
The studio was founded by animators Kenzō Masaoka and Sanae Yamamoto in 1948 as Nihon Dōga Eiga (日本動画映画, Nihon Dōga Eiga) often shortened to Nichidō Eiga (日動映画). In 1956, Toei purchased the studio and it was renamed Toei Animation Co., Ltd. (東映動画株式会社, Tōei Dōga Kabushiki-gaisha; "dōga" is Japanese for "video", and in some extent "animation"). In 1998, the Japanese name was renamed to match with the English name. It has created a number of TV series and movies and adapted Japanese comics as animated series, many popular worldwide. Hayao Miyazaki, Isao Takahata, Yasuji Mori, Leiji Matsumoto and Yōichi Kotabe have worked with the company. Toei was a shareholder in the Japanese anime satellite television network Animax with other anime studios and production companies, such as Sunrise, TMS Entertainment and Nihon Ad Systems Inc.

Although the Toei Company usually contracts Toei Animation to handle its animation internally for some of its works, it occasionally hire other companies to provide animation; although the Toei Company produced the Robot Romance Trilogy, Sunrise (then known as Nippon Sunrise) provided the animation. Toei Company would also enlist the help of other studios such as hiring Academy Productions to produce the animation for Space Emperor God Sigma, rather than use its own studio. Since 1962, Toei Animation uses its own production offices rather than using Toei's television division.

Toei Animation's anime which have won the Animage Anime Grand Prix award are Galaxy Express 999 in 1981, Saint Seiya in 1987 and Sailor Moon in 1992. In addition to producing anime for release in Japan, Toei Animation began providing animation for American films and television series during the 1960s and particularly during the 1980s.

=== Later history and ransomware attack ===
In October 2021, Toei Animation announced that it had signed a strategic partnership with the South Korean entertainment conglomerate CJ ENM.

On March 6, 2022, an incident occurred in which an unauthorized third party attempted to hack Toei Animation's network, which resulted in the company's online store and internal systems becoming temporarily suspended. The company investigated the incident and stated that the hack would affect the broadcast schedules of several anime series, including One Piece. In addition, Dragon Ball Super: Super Hero was also rescheduled to June 11, 2022, due to the hack. On April 6, 2022, Toei Animation announced that it would resume broadcasting the anime series, including One Piece. The following day, the Japanese public broadcaster NHK reported that the hack was caused by a targeted ransomware attack.

On June 5, 2025, the company announced a new animation production label known as Eterna Animation which would focus on original works with the label's first work, Foxing announced at the same time with the short being released during 2026.

On August 26 of that year, the company announced the establishment of another studio in Osaka. The "Osaka Studio" would act as its second domestic animation studio further expanding Toei Animation's production work as well as recruiting artists from the Kansai region and build ties with the local community. According to Toei Animation board member and head of production Kiichiro Yamada, he states that the labor shortage in the Japanese animation industry is a serious issue and that the studio feels that it has an urgency to recruit creators and open studios across other regions in Japan rather than having to deal with the Tokyo studio.

On September 8, 2026, it was reported that the company would enter into a strategic partnership with Lionsgate to release its films in the US, beginning with Monkey Quest in 2027. Lionsgate will also get first-look for new co-productions under the deal.

== Currently in production ==
No.	Title	Year(s) / Release	Notes	Episodes	Ref.
1	One Piece	1999–present	TV anime	1,180	
2	PreCure	2004–present	TV anime (23rd series)	1,067	
3	Butt Detective	2018–present	TV anime	135	
4	Fushigi Dagashiya Zenitendō	2020–present	TV anime	148	
5	Elemon	2023–present	Web series	30	
6	Surviving Science!	2024–present	TV anime	40	
7	Dragon Ball Super: Beerus	2026–present	TV anime	1	

== Television animation ==
NOTE: A few of these productions have no involvement by Toei Animation, but rather Toei Company financing other animation studios instead to produce them.

=== 1960–69 ===
No.	Title	Series director	Broadcast network(s)	Eps	Year(s)	Notes
1	Ookami Shonen Ken	Sadao Tsukioka; Isao Takahata	NET	86	November 11, 1963 – August 16, 1965	Toei's grand debut in TV animation
2	Fujimaru of the Wind	Daisaku Shirakawa; Kimio Yabuki	NET	65	June 7, 1964 – August 31, 1965	Inspired by the manga Kaze no Ishimaru by Sanpei Shirato; animated by Yasuji Mori and Hayao Miyazaki; the anime was renamed Kaze no Fujimaru in order to associate it with its sponsor, Fujisawa Pharmaceuticals (now Astellas Pharma)
3	Jun the Space Patrol Hopper	Hiromi Yamamoto; Taiji Yabushita	NET	44	February 1 – November 29, 1965	
4	Hustle Punch	Hiroshi Ikeda; Isao Takahata	NET	26	November 1, 1965 – April 25, 1966	
5	Rainbow Sentai Robin	Shinichi Suzuki; Takeshi Tamiya	NET	48	April 23, 1966 – March 24, 1967	Adapted from the manga of the same name by Shotaro Ishinomori, which was serialized in Kodansha's Weekly Shonen Magazine throughout 1963; co-produced by Studio Zero
6	The Prince of Pirates		NET	31	May 2 – November 28, 1966	
7	The King Kong Show	Hiroshi Ikeda	American Broadcasting Company; NET	25	September 6, 1966 – March 4, 1967	Co-production with Rankin/Bass Productions; It is the first anime-based series produced in Japan for an American company (not counting Rankin/Bass' previous Animagic stop motion productions, which were also animated in Japan).
8	Sally the Witch	Toshio Katsuta; Hiroshi Ikeda	NET	109	December 5, 1966 – December 30, 1968	Adapted from the manga, which was originally titled Sunny the Witch upon first serialization, but by the time this program aired, it was changed to Sally the Witch by Mitsuteru Yokoyama, which was serialized in Shueisha's Ribon magazine for girls; episodes 1 through 17 episodes of this TV anime were filmed in black-and-white, and the remainder of the series (episodes 18 through 109) was filmed in color, making it one of the earliest color anime, alongside Mushi Production's Kimba the White Lion in 1965 and Tatsunoko Production's Speed Racer in 1967.
9	Pyunpyunmaru		NET	26	July 3, 1967 – March 30, 1969	
10	GeGeGe no Kitarō		Fuji TV	65	January 3, 1968 – March 30, 1969	Adapted from the manga Hakaba no Kitaro and GeGeGe no Kitaro by Shigeru Mizuki which were serialized in Kodansha's Weekly Shonen Magazine from 1960 to 1969
11	Cyborg 009		NET	26	April 5 – September 27, 1968	Adapted from the manga Cyborg 009 by Shotaro Ishinomori, which was serialized in Shonen Gahosha's Monthly Shonen King, Kodansha's Weekly Shonen Magazine, Akita Shoten's Monthly Boken-Oh, and Mushi Production's COM magazines from 1964 to 1969; it is also a continuation of the 1966–1967 anime film serial, although it is in monochrome, unlike the films, which were in color
12	Akane-chan		Fuji TV	26	April 6 – September 29, 1968	
13	Sabu to Ichi Torimono Hikae		NET	52	October 3, 1968 – September 24, 1969	co-production with Mushi Productions and Zero Studio
14	Himitsu no Akko-chan		NET	94	January 6, 1969 – October 26, 1970	Adapted from the manga by comedy-king Fujio Akatsuka, which was serialized from 1962 to 1965 in Shueisha's Ribon magazine, as the first magical girl manga series; while Sally the Witch was the first magical girl anime to hit the airwaves.
15	Mōretsu Atarō		NET	90	April 4, 1969 – December 25, 1970	
16	The Smokey Bear Show	Arthur Rankin Jr.; Jules Bass	American Broadcasting Company	17	September 6, 1969 – September 5, 1970	Co-production with Rankin/Bass Productions
17	Tiger Mask		YTV (Later Nippon TV)	105	October 2, 1969 – September 30, 1971	

=== 1970–79 ===
No.	Title	Series director	Broadcast network(s)	Eps	Year(s)	Notes
18	Kick no Oni		TBS	26	October 2, 1970 – March 26, 1971	
19	Mahou no Mako-chan		NET	48	November 2, 1970 – September 27, 1971	
20	Sarutobi Ecchan		NET	26	October 4, 1971 – March 27, 1972	
21	Apacchi Yakyuugun		NET	26	October 6, 1971 – March 29, 1972	
22	GeGeGe no Kitarō		Fuji TV	45	October 7, 1971 – September 28, 1972	second series
23	Genshi Shonen Ryu	Masayuki Akehi	TBS	22	October 30, 1971 – March 25, 1972	
24	Mahou Tsukai Chappy		NET	39	April 3 – December 25, 1972	
25	Devilman	Tomoharu Katsumata	NET	39	July 8, 1972 – April 7, 1973	
26	Astroganger	Yoshikata Nitta	Nippon TV	26	October 4, 1972 – March 28, 1973	
27	Mazinger Z		Fuji TV	92	December 3, 1972 – September 1, 1974	
28	Babel Ni-Sei		NET	39	January 1 – September 24, 1973	
29	Microid S		NET	26	April 7 – October 6, 1973	
30	Miracle Shoujo Limit-chan		NET	25	October 1, 1973 – March 25, 1974	
31	Dororon Enma-kun	Kimio Yabuki	Fuji TV	25	October 4, 1973 – March 28, 1974	
32	Cutie Honey	Tomoharu Katsumata	NET	25	October 13, 1973 – March 30, 1974	
33	Majokko Megu-chan		NET	72	April 1, 1974 – September 29, 1975	original series
34	Getter Robo		Fuji TV	51	April 4, 1974 – May 8, 1975	Original series
35	Great Mazinger		Fuji TV	56	September 8, 1974 – September 28, 1975	
36	Calimero	Takeshi Tamiya; Yuugo Serikawa	NET	45	October 15, 1974 – September 30, 1975	
37	Shounen Tokugawa Ieyasu	Kimio Yabuki; Takeshi Tamiya	NET	20	April 9 – September 17, 1975	
38	Getter Robo G	Osamu Kasai	Fuji TV	39	May 15, 1975 – March 25, 1976	
39	Steel Jeeg	Masayuki Akehi	NET	74	October 5, 1975 – August 29, 1976	Original series
40	UFO Robot Grendizer	Tomoharu Katsumata	Fuji TV	74	October 5, 1975 – February 27, 1977	
41	Ikkyū-san	Kimio Yabuki Yoshikata Nitta	NET (later TV Asahi)	296	October 15, 1975 – June 28, 1982	
42	Gaiking	Tomoharu Katsumata	Fuji TV	44	April 1, 1976 – January 27, 1977	Original series
43	Dash Machine Hayabusa		NET (later TV Asahi)	21	April 2 – September 17, 1976	
44	Chou Denji Robo Combattler V	Tadao Nagahama	NET (later TV Asahi)	54	April 17, 1976 – May 28, 1977	Original series
45	Magne Robo Gakeen	Tomoharu Katsumata	NET (later TV Asahi)	39	September 5, 1976 – June 26, 1977	Original series
46	Candy Candy	Tetsuo Imazawa	NET (later TV Asahi)	115	October 1, 1976 – February 2, 1979	
47	Jetter Mars	Rintaro	Fuji TV	27	February 3 – September 15, 1977	Co-produced with Tezuka Productions and Madhouse; pseudo-sequel to Tetsuwan Atom
48	Wakusei Robo Danguard Ace	Tomoharu Katsumata	Fuji TV	56	March 6, 1977 – March 26, 1978	Original series
49	Hyouga Senshi Guyslugger	Noboru Ishiguro	TV Asahi	20	April 12 – August 30, 1977	Co-produced with Tokyo Movie Shinsha and Oka Studios; semi-sequel to Cyborg 009
50	Chou Denji Machine Voltes V	Tadao Nagahama	TV Asahi	40	June 4, 1977 – March 25, 1978	Original series
51	Chojin Sentai Balatack	Nobutaka Nishizawa	TV Asahi	31	July 3, 1977 – March 5, 1978	Original series
52	Arrow Emblem Hawk of the Grand Prix	Rintaro	Fuji TV	44	September 22, 1977 – August 31, 1978	Released in the US and elsewhere as a compilation called Super Grand Prix
53	Fly High! Machine Hiryū	Seitaro Hama	Tokyo 12 Broadcasting	21	October 5, 1977 – March 29, 1978	Co-produced with Tatsunoko Production; a parody of both Tatsunoko's Mach GoGoGo and Toei's Dash Machine Hayabusa
54	Gekisō! Ruben Kaiser	Yuji Nunokawa	TV Asahi	17	October 10, 1977 – February 6, 1978	Co-produced with Wako Productions and Green Box
55	Majokko Tickle	Takashi Hisaoka	TV Asahi	45	March 6, 1978 – January 29, 1979	Original series
56	Space Pirate Captain Harlock	Rintaro	TV Asahi	42	March 14, 1978 – February 13, 1979	
57	Tosho Daimos	Tadao Nagahama	TV Asahi	44	April 1, 1978 – January 27, 1979	Original series
58	SF Saiyuki Starzinger		Fuji TV	73	April 2, 1978 – August 26, 1979	Sci-Fi Journey to the West: Starzinger; Spaceketeers on Force Five
59	Uchū Majin Daikengo		TV Asahi	26	July 27, 1978 – February 15, 1979	Co-production with Studio Nue and Green Box
60	Galaxy Express 999		Fuji TV	113	September 14, 1978 – March 26, 1981	
61	Eiko no Tenshitachi: Pink Lady Monogatari (Glorious Angels: The Story of Pink Lady)		Tokyo 12 Broadcasting	33	October 24, 1978 – June 12, 1979	
62	Captain Future	Tomoharu Katsumata	NHK General TV	52	November 7, 1978 – December 18, 1979	adaptation of the pulp-fiction sci-fi stories by Mort Weisinger
63	Hana no Ko Lunlun		TV Asahi	50	February 9, 1979 – February 8, 1980	
64	Cyborg 009	Ryousuke Takahashi	TV Asahi	50	March 6, 1979 – March 25, 1980	color remake (Sunrise co-production)
65	Mirai Robo Daltanias	Tadao Nagahama; Katsutoshi Sasaki	Tokyo 12 Broadcasting	47	March 21, 1979 – March 5, 1980	co-produced with Nippon Sunrise
66	Entaku no Kishi Monogatari: Moero Arthur	Tomoharu Katsumata	Fuji TV	30	September 9, 1979 – March 30, 1980	

=== 1980–89 ===
No	Title	Series director(s)	Broadcast network(s)	Eps	Year(s)	Notes
67	Maeterlinck no Aoi Tori: Tyltyl Mytyl no Bouken Ryokou	Hiroshi Sasagawa	Fuji TV	26	January 9 – July 9, 1980	Co-production with Academy Productions
68	Mahou Shoujo Lalabel	Hiroshi Shidara	TV Asahi	49	February 15, 1980 – February 27, 1981	
69	Space Emperor God Sigma	Takeyuki Kanda (eps 1–10); Katsuhiko Taguchi (eps 11–50)	TV Tokyo	50	March 19, 1980 – February 25, 1981	Co-production with Academy Productions
70	Moero Arthur: Hakuba no Ouji		Fuji TV	22	April 6 – September 21, 1980	
71	Ganbare Genki	Rintaro	Fuji TV	35	July 16, 1980 – April 1, 1981	Adaptation of Yū Koyama's manga of the same name
72	Hyakujuu-Ou GoLion	Katsuhiko Taguchi	TV Tokyo	52	March 4, 1981 – February 24, 1982	
73	Hello! Sandybell	Hiroshi Shidara	TV Asahi	47	March 6, 1981 – February 26, 1982	
74	Wakakusa Monogatari Yori Wakakusa no Yon Shimai	Kazuya Miyazaki	Tokyo 12	26	April 7 – September 29, 1981	Co-produced with Kokusai Eiga-sha
75	Dr. Slump: Arale-chan	Minoru Okazaki	Fuji TV	243	April 8, 1981 – February 19, 1986	Adaptation of Akira Toriyama's manga of the same name
76	Shin Taketori Monogatari: 1000-nen Joou	Nobutaka Nishizawa	Fuji TV	42	April 16, 1981 – March 25, 1982	
77	Tiger Mask Nisei	Kōzō Morishita	TV Asahi	33	April 20, 1981 – January 18, 1982	
78	Ginga Senpuu Braiger	Takao Yotsuji	TV Tokyo	39	October 6, 1981 – June 30, 1982	Co-produced with Kokusai Eiga-sha
79	Honey Honey no Suteki na Bouken	Takeshi Shirato	Fuji TV	29	October 7, 1981 – May 1, 1982	Co-produced with Kokusai Eiga-sha
80	Asari-chan	Osamu Kasai	TV Asahi	54	January 25, 1982 – February 28, 1983	
81	Kikou Kantai Dairugger XV	Kōzō Morishita	TV Tokyo	52	March 3, 1982 – March 23, 1983	
82	Patalliro!	Nobutaka Nishizawa	Fuji TV	49	April 8, 1982 – May 13, 1983	
83	The Kabocha Wine	Kimio Yabuki	Fuji TV	TV Asahi	95	July 5, 1982 – August 27, 1984
84	Waga Seishun no Arcadia: Mugen Kidou SSX	Masamitsu Sasaki; Tomoharu Katsumata	TBS	22	October 13, 1982 – March 30, 1983	
85	Aishite Knight	Osamu Kasai	TV Asahi	42	March 1, 1983 – January 24, 1984	
86	Kousoku Denjin Albegus	Kōzō Morishita	TV Tokyo	45	March 30, 1983 – February 8, 1984	
87	Kinnikuman	Tetsuo Imazawa; Yasuo Yamayoshi	Nippon TV	137	April 3, 1983 – October 1, 1986	
88	Stop!! Hibari-kun!	Takashi Hisaoka	Fuji TV	35	May 20, 1983 – January 27, 1984	
89	Bemubemu Hunter Kotengu Tenmaru	Hiroshi Shidara		19	May 26 – October 27, 1983	
90	Yume Senshi Wingman	Tomoharu Katsumata	TV Asahi	47	February 7, 1984 – February 26, 1985	
91	Tongari Boushi no Memoru	Osamu Kasai	TV Asahi	50	March 3, 1984 – March 3, 1985	
92	Video Senshi Lezarion	Kōzō Morishita	TBS	45	March 4, 1984 – February 3, 1985	Co-produced with Daewon Animation, Sei Young Animation and Gyoyuk Animation
93	Gu-Gu Ganmo	Yoshikata Nitta	Fuji TV	50	March 18, 1984 – March 17, 1985	
94	Hokuto no Ken	Toyoo Ashida	Fuji TV	109	October 11, 1984 – March 5, 1987	
95	Haai Step Jun	Hiroshi Shidara	TV Asahi	45	March 10, 1985 – January 12, 1986	
96	Konpora Kid	Kōzō Morishita	TV Asahi	26	June 3 – December 23, 1985	
97	Gegege no Kitaro	Hiroki Shibata Osamu Kasai	Fuji TV	108	October 12, 1985 – February 6, 1988	Third series
98	Maple Town Monogatari	Junichi Satō	TV Asahi	52	January 19, 1986 – January 11, 1987	
99	Dragon Ball	Daisuke Nishio; Minoru Okazaki	Fuji TV	153	February 26, 1986 – April 12, 1989	Adaptation of Akira Toriyama's manga of the same name
100	Ginga Nagareboshi Gin	Tomoharu Katsumata	TV Asahi	21	April 7 – August 22, 1986	
101	Go-Q-Choji Ikkiman	Nobutaka Nishizawa	Nippon TV	32	April 13 – November 23, 1986	
102	Saint Seiya	Yasuhito Kikuchi	TV Asahi	114	October 11, 1986 – April 1, 1989	
103	Shin Maple Town Monogatari: Palm Town-hen	Junichi Sato	TV Asahi	50	January 18 – December 27, 1987	Broadcast in the U.S. on Nickelodeon as Maple Town
104	Hokuto no Ken 2	Toyoo Ashida	Fuji TV	43	March 12, 1987 – February 18, 1988	
105	Transformers: The☆Headmasters	Katsutoshi Sasaki	Nippon TV	35	July 3, 1987 – March 28, 1988	First in a trilogy of Japanese-exclusive Transformers shows.
106	Sanrio Anime Sekai Meisaku Gekijou	Yoshio Kuroda		13	September 19 – December 12, 1987	It was an international co-production between the US and Japan. Animation was by Toei Animation (Japan) with help from Korean studio Big Star, but the scripts and voices were all in English. It aired on CBS in the US in 1987.
107	Bikkuriman	Yukio Kaizawa	TV Asahi	75	October 11, 1987 – April 2, 1989	
108	Kamen no Ninja Akakage	Susumu Ishizaki	Nippon TV	23	October 13, 1987 – March 22, 1988	
109	Lady Lady!!	Hiroshi Shidara	TBS	21	October 21, 1987 – March 23, 1988	
110	Tatakae!! Ramenman	Masayuki Akehi	Nippon TV	35	January 10 – September 11, 1988	Kinnikuman spin-off
111	Gegege no Kitaro: Jigoku-hen	Osamu Kasai	Fuji TV	7	February 8 – March 21, 1988	
112	Sakigake!! Otokojuku	Nobutaka Nishizawa	Fuji TV	34	February 25 – November 14, 1988	
113	World Masterpiece Theater		TV Tokyo	4	April 7 – April 28, 1988	Introduced many to timeless tales and is known for its beautiful animation style and heartwarming (or sometimes tearjerking) stories.
114	Transformers: Choujin Master Force	Tetsuo Imazawa	Nippon TV	43	April 12, 1988 – March 7, 1989	Second in a trilogy of Japanese-exclusive Transformers shows
115	Hello! Lady Lynn	Hiroshi Shidara	TV Tokyo	36	May 12, 1988 – January 26, 1989	Second season of Lady Lady!!
116	Himitsu no Akko-chan 2	Hiroki Shibata	Fuji TV	61	October 9, 1988 – December 24, 1989	Second season of Himitsu no Akko-chan
117	Tatakae! Chou Robot Seimeitai Transformers Victory	Yoshikata Nitta	Nippon TV	38	March 14 – December 19, 1989	It's the final installment in the original Transformers Generation 1 storyline and the only one entirely produced in Japan.
118	Shin Bikkuriman	Yukio Kaizawa	TV Asahi	72	April 9, 1989 – August 26, 1990	Sequel of Bikkuriman
119	Akuma-kun	Junichi Sato	TV Asahi	42	April 15, 1989 – March 24, 1990	
120	Dragon Ball Z	Daisuke Nishio	Fuji TV	291	April 26, 1989 – January 31, 1996	Adaptation of the second installment of Akira Toriyama's Dragon Ball series
121	Mahoutsukai Sally 2	Osamu Kasai	TV Asahi	88	October 9, 1989 – December 22, 1990	Sequel and a reboot of Mahoutsukai Sally
122	Kariage-kun	Hiroki Shibata	Fuji TV	59	October 17, 1989 – December 21, 1990	An anime adaptation of a long-running gag manga of the same name by Masashi Ueda

=== 1990–99 ===
No.	Title	Series director	Broadcast network(s)	Eps	Year(s)	Notes
123	Mouretsu Ataro	Junichi Sato	TV Asahi	34	April 21 – December 22, 1990	
124	Magical Taluluto	Masahiko Ōkura Shigeyasu Yamauchi	TV Asahi	87	September 9, 1990 – May 10, 1992	
125	Goldfish Warning!	Junichi Sato	TV Asahi	54	January 12, 1991 – February 29, 1992	
126	Getter Robo Go	Hiroki Shibata	TV Tokyo	50	February 11, 1991 – January 27, 1992	
127	Kinnikuman: Kinnikusei Oui Soudatsu-hen	Atsutoshi Umezawa	Nippon TV	46	October 6, 1991 – September 27, 1992	
128	Dragon Quest: Dai no Daibouken	Nobutaka Nishizawa	TBS	46	October 17, 1991 – September 24, 1992	
129	Bishoujo Senshi Sailor Moon	Junichi Sato	TV Asahi	46	March 7, 1992 – February 27, 1993	
130	Super Bikkuriman	Yukio Kaizawa	TV Asahi	44	May 17, 1992 – April 4, 1993	
131	Shin Calimero	Tsuneo Tominaga	TV Tokyo	52	October 15, 1992 – September 9, 1993	
132	Bishoujo Senshi Sailor Moon R	Junichi Satō (eps 1–13) Kunihiko Ikuhara (eps 14–43)	TV Asahi	43	March 6, 1993 – March 12, 1994	
133	GS Mikami	Atsutoshi Umezawa	TV Asahi	45	April 11, 1993 – March 6, 1994	
134	Slam Dunk	Nobutaka Nishizawa	TV Asahi	101	October 16, 1993 – March 23, 1996	
135	Aoki Densetsu Shoot!	Daisuke Nishio	Fuji TV	58	November 7, 1993 – December 25, 1994	
136	Marmalade Boy	Akinori Yabe	TV Asahi	76	March 13, 1994 – September 3, 1995	
137	Bishoujo Senshi Sailor Moon S	Kunihiko Ikuhara	TV Asahi	38	March 19, 1994 – February 25, 1995	
138	Shinken Densetsu: Tight Road	Yukio Kaizawa	TV Tokyo	13	October 7 – December 28, 1994	
139	Kuusou Kagaku Sekai Gulliver Boy	Toyoo Ashida	Fuji TV	50	January 8 – December 24, 1995	
140	Bishoujo Senshi Sailor Moon SuperS	Kunihiko Ikuhara	TV Asahi	39	March 4, 1995 – March 2, 1996	
141	Sekai Meisaku Douwa: Wow! Maerchen Oukoku	Hiroshi Shidara	Fuji TV	26	April 7 – September 29, 1995	
142	Gokinjo Monogatari	Atsutoshi Umezawa	TV Asahi	50	September 10, 1995 – September 1, 1996	
143	Gegege no Kitaro	Daisuke Nishio	Fuji TV	114	January 7, 1996 – March 29, 1998	Fourth series; Toei's first work using digital animation from episode 64 onward
144	Dragon Ball GT	Osamu Kasai	Fuji TV	64	February 7, 1996 – November 19, 1997	
145	Bishoujo Senshi Sailor Moon: Sailor Stars	Takuya Igarashi	TV Asahi	34	March 9, 1996 – February 8, 1997	
146	Jigoku Sensei Nube	Yukio Kaizawa	TV Asahi	49	April 13, 1996 – June 21, 1997	
147	Hana yori Dango	Shigeyasu Yamauchi	TV Asahi	51	September 8, 1996 – August 31, 1997	
148	Cutie Honey F	Noriyo Sasaki	TV Asahi	39	February 15, 1997 – January 31, 1998	
149	Kindaichi Shounen no Jikenbo	Daisuke Nishio	Nippon TV	148	April 7, 1997 – September 11, 2000	
150	Azumi Mamma★Mia	Yukio Kaizawa	TV Asahi	60	July 7 – October 2, 1997	
151	Yume no Crayon Oukoku	Junichi Sato	TV Asahi	70	September 7, 1997 – January 31, 1999	
152	Hanitarou desu	Yukio Kaizawa	TV Asahi	70	October 6, 1997 – January 22, 1998	
153	Dr. Slump	Shigeyasu Yamauchi	Fuji TV	74	November 26, 1997 – September 22, 1999	Second series
154	Haruniwa Ie no 3 Nin-me	Tetsu Yamada	TV Asahi	45	January 23 – March 26, 1998	
155	Kocchi Muite Miiko	Takao Yoshizawa	TV Asahi	42	February 14, 1998 – February 6, 1999	
156	Heli-Tako Puu-chan	Mitsuo Hashimoto	TV Asahi	42	February 14, 1998 – February 6, 1999	
157	Fushigi Mahou Fun Fun Pharmacy	Yukio Kaizawa	TV Asahi	48	February 15, 1998 – February 6, 1999	
158	Yu-Gi-Oh!	Hiroyuki Kakudō	TV Asahi	27	April 4 – October 10, 1998	
159	Himitsu no Akko-chan 3	Hiroki Shibata	Fuji TV	44	April 5, 1998 – February 28, 1999	
160	Shugogetten!	Yukio Kaizawa	TV Asahi	22	October 17, 1998 – April 3, 1999	
161	Magical Doremi	Junichi Satō; Takuya Igarashi	TV Asahi	51	February 7, 1999 – January 30, 2000	
162	Phantom Thief Jeanne	Atsutoshi Umezawa	TV Asahi	44	February 13, 1999 – January 29, 2000	
163	Digimon Adventure	Hiroyuki Kakudō	Fuji TV	54	March 7, 1999 – March 26, 2000	
164	One Piece	Kōnosuke Uda (eps 1–278); Junji Shimizu (eps 131–159); Munehisa Sakai (eps 244–372); Hiroaki Miyamoto (eps 352–679); Toshinori Fukazawa (eps 663–891); Tatsuya Nagamine (eps 780–782; eps 892-); Satoshi Itō (eps 780–782; eps 962–); Aya Komaki (eps 892–961); Kōhei Kureta (eps 892–1030); Yasunori Koyama (ep 1031–)	Fuji TV	1175	October 20, 1999 – present	

=== 2000–09 ===
No.	Title	Series director	Broadcast network(s)	Eps	Year(s)	Notes
165	Mushrambo	Tetsuo Imazawa	TV Asahi	32	February 5 – September 23, 2000	Original series
166	Ojamajo Doremi Sharp	Takuya Igarashi	TV Asahi	49	February 6, 2000 – January 28, 2001	Original series
167	Digimon Adventure 02	Hiroyuki Kakudō	Fuji TV	50	April 2, 2000 – March 25, 2001	Original series
168	Shoubushi Densetsu Tetsuya	Nobutaka Nishizawa	TV Asahi	20	October 7, 2000 – March 24, 2001	
169	Pi Po Pa Po Patrol-kun	Mitsuo Hashimoto	Fuji TV	65	December 4, 2000 – March 7, 2001	
170	Motto! Ojamajo Doremi	Takuya Igarashi	TV Asahi	50	February 4, 2001 – January 27, 2002	Original series
171	Digimon Tamers	Yukio Kaizawa	Fuji TV	51	April 1, 2001 – March 31, 2002	Original series
172	Nono-chan	Nobutaka Nishizawa	TV Asahi	61	July 7, 2001 – September 28, 2002	
173	Kinnikuman II Sei	Toshiaki Komura	TV Tokyo	51	January 9 – December 25, 2002	
174	Kanon	Naoyuki Itō	Fuji TV	13	January 31 – March 28, 2002	
175	Ojamajo Doremi Dokkaan!	Takuya Igarashi	TV Asahi	51	February 3, 2002 – January 26, 2003	Original series
176	Digimon Frontier	Yukio Kaizawa	Fuji TV	50	April 7, 2002 – March 30, 2003	Original series
177	Tsuri Baka Nisshi	Tetsuo Imazawa	TV Asahi	36	November 2, 2002 – September 13, 2003	
178	Ashita no Nadja	Takuya Igarashi	TV Asahi; Animax	50	February 2, 2003 – January 25, 2004	Original series
179	Air Master	Daisuke Nishio	Nippon TV	27	April 2 – October 1, 2003	
180	Konjiki no Gash Bell!!	Tetsuji Nakamura; Yukio Kaizawa	Fuji TV	150	April 6, 2003 – March 26, 2006	
181	Bobobo-bo Bo-bobo	Hiroki Shibata	TV Asahi	76	November 8, 2003 – October 15, 2005	
182	Futari wa Precure	Daisuke Nishio	TV Asahi	49	February 1, 2004 – January 30, 2005	Original series
183	Kinnikuman II Sei: Ultimate Muscle	Toshiaki Komura	TV Tokyo	13	April 8 – July 1, 2004	Japanese broadcast of the American second season
184	Bouken Ou Beet	Tatsuya Nagamine	TV Tokyo	52	September 30, 2004 – September 29, 2005	
185	Ring ni Kakero 1	Toshiaki Komura	TV Asahi	12	October 6 – December 15, 2004	
186	Xenosaga The Animation	Gō Koga	TV Asahi	12	January 6 – March 24, 2005	Based on the video game series by Namco
187	Futari wa Precure: Max Heart	Daisuke Nishio	TV Asahi	47	February 6, 2005 – January 29, 2006	Original series
188	Bouken Ou Beet Excellion	Tatsuya Nagamine	TV Tokyo	25	October 6, 2005 – March 30, 2006	
189	Gaiking: Legend of Daiku-Maryu	Masahiro Hosoda	TV Asahi	39	November 12, 2005 – September 24, 2006	Original series
190	Kinnikuman II Sei: Ultimate Muscle 2	Toshiaki Komura	TV Tokyo	13	January 5 – March 30, 2006	Additional U.S.-produced episodes
191	Ayakashi: Japanese Classic Horror	Hidehiko Kadota (Tenshu Monogatari – anime); Kenji Nakamura (Bakeneko); Kouzou Nagayama (Tenshu Monogatari); Tetsuo Imazawa (Yotsuya Kaidan)	Fuji TV	11	January 13 – March 24, 2006	
192	Futari wa Precure: Splash☆Star	Toshiaki Komura	TV Asahi	49	February 5, 2006 – January 28, 2007	Original series
193	Digimon Savers	Naoyuki Itō	Fuji TV	48	April 2, 2006 – March 25, 2007	Original series
194	Air Gear	Hajime Kamegaki	TV Tokyo	25	April 5 – September 27, 2006	
195	Ring ni Kakero 1: Nichibei Kessen-hen	Yukio Kaizawa	TV Asahi	12	April 6 – June 12, 2006	
196	Kamisama Kazoku	Masatoshi Chioka	Animax	13	May 18 – August 10, 2006	
197	Binbou Shimai Monogatari	Yukio Kaizawa	TV Asahi	10	June 30 – September 15, 2006	
198	Demashita! Powerpuff Girls Z	Megumu Ishiguro	TV Tokyo	52	July 1, 2006 – June 30, 2007	Japanese spin-off of Cartoon Network's The Powerpuff Girls
199	Giniro no Olynsis: Tokito	Katsumi Tokoro	Nagoya TV	12	October 6 – December 22, 2006	
200	Happy☆Lucky Bikkuriman	Gō Koga	TV Asahi	46	October 15, 2006 – September 30, 2007	
201	Yes! Precure 5	Toshiaki Komura	TV Asahi	49	February 4, 2007 – January 27, 2008	Original series
202	Gegege no Kitaro	Yukio Kaizawa	Fuji TV	100	April 1, 2007 – March 29, 2009	Fifth series
203	Lovely Complex	Kōnosuke Uda	TBS	24	April 7 – September 29, 2007	
204	Taichi Senjimon	Hiroki Shibata	KBS	39	April 29, 2007 – January 20, 2008	
205	Mononoke	Kenji Nakamura	Fuji TV	12	July 13 – September 28, 2007	Original series
206	Hatara Kids Mai Ham Gumi	Tetsuo Imazawa	TV Asahi	50	October 7, 2007 – October 5, 2008	Original series
207	Hakaba Kitaro	Masatoshi Chioka	Fuji TV	11	January 11 – March 21, 2008	
208	Yes! Precure 5 GoGo!	Toshiaki Komura	TV Asahi	48	February 3, 2008 – January 25, 2009	Original series
209	Uchi no 3 Shimai	Izumi Todo	TV Tokyo	102	April 8, 2008 – March 30, 2010	Based off the author's 2005 blog of the same name. Adapts stories from the blog, and features original segments.
210	RoboDz	Daisuke Nishio	Toon Disney	26	June 2 – November 24, 2008	
211	Battle Spirits: Shounen Toppa Bashin	Mitsuru Hongo	TV Asahi	50	September 7, 2008 – September 6, 2009	
212	Negibouzu no Asatarou	Hidehito Ueda (7 episodes); Hideki Hiroshima (6 episodes); Hiroki Shibata (6 episodes); Hiroyuki Kakudō (4 episodes); Masahiro Hosoda (eps 34, 42); Masatoshi Chioka (ep 32); Morio Hatano (eps 35, 46); Noriyo Sasaki (4 episodes); Tetsuo Imazawa (6 episodes); Yōko Ikeda (eps 1, 22); Yuriko Kado (eps 4, 13)	TV Asahi	48	October 12, 2008 – September 27, 2009	
213	Fresh Precure!	Akifumi Zako (eps 16–50); Junji Shimizu	TV Asahi	50	February 1, 2009 – January 30, 2010	Original series
214	Marie & Gali	Kōhei Kureta; Yukio Kaizawa	NHK	40	March 31, 2009 – March 23, 2010	Original series
215	Dragon Ball Z Kai	Yasuhiro Nowatari	Fuji TV	98	April 5, 2009 – March 27, 2011	Remastered of Dragon Ball Z
216	Kaidan Restaurant	Yōko Ikeda	TV Asahi	23	October 13, 2009 – June 8, 2010	
217	Kuuchuu Buranko	Kenji Nakamura	Fuji TV	11	October 15 – December 24, 2009	

=== 2010–19 ===
No.	Title	Series director(s)	Broadcast network(s)	Eps	Year(s)	Notes
218	Heartcatch Precure!	Tatsuya Nagamine	TV Asahi	49	February 7, 2010 – January 30, 2011	Original series
219	Marie & Gali ver. 2.0	Kōhei Kureta; Yukio Kaizawa	NHK	30	March 20, 2010 – March 22, 2011	Original series
220	Ketsuinu	Haruki Kasugamori	AT-X	13	April 1 – May 31, 2010	
221	Ring ni Kakero 1: Kage Dou-hen	Toshiaki Komura	Animax	6	April 2 – June 17, 2010	
222	Digimon Xros Wars	Tetsuya Endō	TV Asahi	30	July 6, 2010 – March 8, 2011	Original series
223	Suite Precure♪	Munehisa Sakai	TV Asahi	48	February 6, 2011 – January 29, 2012	Original series
224	Digimon Xros Wars: Aku no Death General to Nanatsu no Oukoku	Tetsuya Endō	TV Asahi	24	April 3 – September 25, 2011	Original series
225	Toriko	Akifumi Zako; Hidehito Ueda (eps 100–131)	Fuji TV	147	April 3, 2011 – March 30, 2014	
226	Ring ni Kakero 1: Sekai Taikai-hen	Hiroshi Ikehata	Animax	6	April 10 – June 12, 2011	
227	Digimon Xros Wars: Toki wo Kakeru Shounen Hunter-tachi	Yukio Kaizawa	TV Asahi	25	October 2, 2011 – March 25, 2012	Original series
228	Smile Precure!	Takashi Otsuka	TV Asahi	48	February 5, 2012 – January 27, 2013	Original series
229	Saint Seiya Omega	Kōhei Kureta (ep 73); Morio Hatano (eps 1-51); Tatsuya Nagamine (ep 52)	TV Asahi	97	April 1, 2012 – March 30, 2014	
230	Tanken Driland	Toshinori Fukazawa	TV Tokyo	37	July 7, 2012 – March 30, 2013	
231	Dokidoki! Precure	Gō Koga	TV Asahi	49	February 3, 2013 – January 26, 2014	Original series
232	Tanken Driland: 1000-nen no Mahou	Narumi Kuroda (eps 64–88); Toshinori Fukazawa (eps 38–63)	TV Tokyo	51	April 6, 2013 – March 29, 2014	
233	Kyousou Giga	Rie Matsumoto	Tokyo MX	10	October 10 – December 19, 2013	Original series
234	Happiness Charge Precure!	Tatsuya Nagamine	TV Asahi	49	February 2, 2014 – January 25, 2015	Original series
235	Majin Bone	Kōnosuke Uda	TV Tokyo	52	April 1, 2014 – March 31, 2015	
236	Marvel Disk Wars: The Avengers	Toshiaki Komura	Disney XD Japan; TV Tokyo	51	April 2, 2014 – March 25, 2015	Japanese-American co-production with Marvel Comics and Walt Disney Japan
237	Kindaichi Shounen no Jikenbo Returns	Yutaka Tsuchida	Nippon TV	25	April 5 – September 27, 2014	
238	Abarenbou Rikishi!! Matsutaro	Yukio Kaizawa	TV Asahi	23	April 6 – September 28, 2014	
239	Dragon Ball Z Kai	Togo Shoji	Fuji TV	61	April 6, 2014 – June 28, 2015	Remastered version of the Majin Buu saga that adheres more to the manga's story.
240	World Trigger	Mitsuru Hongo	TV Asahi	73	October 5, 2014 – April 3, 2016	
241	Go! Princess Precure	Yūta Tanaka	TV Asahi	50	February 1, 2015 – January 31, 2016	Original series
242	Dragon Ball Super	Kouhei Hatano (eps 68–76); Masatoshi Chioka (eps 1-46); Morio Hatano (eps 33–76); Ryōta Nakamura (eps 77–131); Tatsuya Nagamine (eps 77–131)	Fuji TV	131	July 5, 2015 – March 25, 2018	
243	Kindaichi Shounen no Jikenbo Returns (Season 2)	Yōko Ikeda	Nippon TV	22	October 3, 2015 – March 26, 2016	
244	Witchy Precure!	Masato Mitsuka	TV Asahi	50	February 7, 2016 – January 29, 2017	Original series
245	Pretty Guardian Sailor Moon Crystal Season III	Chiaki Kon	Tokyo MX	13	April 4 – June 27, 2016	Death Busters arc
246	Digimon Universe: Appli Monsters	Gō Koga	TV Tokyo	52	October 1, 2016 – September 30, 2017	Original series
247	Tiger Mask W	Toshiaki Komura	TV Asahi	38	October 2, 2016 – July 2, 2017	Third series
248	Kirakira☆Precure A La Mode	Kōhei Kureta; Yukio Kaizawa	TV Asahi	49	February 5, 2017 – January 28, 2018	Original series
249	Seikaisuru Kado	Kazuya Murata	Tokyo MX	12	April 7 – June 30, 2017	Original series
250	Hug tto! Precure	Akifumi Zako; Junichi Satō	TV Asahi	49	February 4, 2018 – January 27, 2019	Original series
251	Gegege no Kitaro (2018)	Kouji Ogawa	Fuji TV	97	April 1, 2018 – March 29, 2020	Sixth series
252	Oshiri Tantei	Hiroki Shibata	NHK	10	May 3 – August 25, 2018	
253	Bakutsuri Bar Hunter	Kenji Seto	TV Tokyo	25	October 2, 2018 – March 26, 2019	co-production with Studio Gallop
254	Oshiri Tantei (Season 2)	Hiroki Shibata	NHK	16	December 1, 2018 – March 30, 2019	
255	Star☆Twinkle Precure	Hiroaki Miyamoto	TV Asahi	49	February 3, 2019 – January 26, 2020	Original series
256	Oshiri Tantei (Season 3)	Hiroki Shibata	NHK	13	July 6 – September 28, 2019	

=== 2020–present ===
No.	Title	Series director(s)	Broadcast network	Eps	Year(s)	Notes
257	Healin' Good Pretty Cure	Yoko Ikeda	ANN	45	February 2, 2020 – February 21, 2021	Original series
258	Oshiri Tantei (Season 4)	Hiroki Shibata	NHK	13	April 4 – June 27, 2020	
259	Future's Folktales	Masami Shimoda	J Tele	13	April 4 – June 27, 2020	Original series
260	Digimon Adventure	Masato Mitsuka	Fuji TV	67	April 5, 2020 – September 26, 2021	reboot of Digimon Adventure
261	Fushigi Dagashiya Zenitendō	Satoshi Tomioka	NHK Educational TV	148	September 8, 2020 – March 14, 2025	co-production with Kanaban Graphics
262	Dragon Quest: The Adventure of Dai	Kazuya Karasawa	TV Tokyo	100	October 3, 2020 – October 22, 2022	
263	World Trigger (Season 2)	Morio Hatano	TV Asahi	12	January 10 – April 4, 2021	
264	Tropical-Rouge! Pretty Cure	Yutaka Tsuchida	ANN	46	February 28, 2021 – January 30, 2022	Original series
265	Oshiri Tantei (Season 5)	Hiroki Shibata	NHK	13	April 3 – June 26, 2021	
266	Digimon Ghost Game	Kimitoshi Chioka; Masato Mitsuka	Fuji TV	67	October 3, 2021 – March 26, 2023	
267	World Trigger (Season 3)	Morio Hatano	TV Asahi	14	October 10, 2021 – January 23, 2022	
268	Oshiri Tantei (Season 6)	Hiroki Shibata	NHK	13	April 9 – July 2, 2022	
269	Delicious Party Pretty Cure	Toshinori Fukazawa	ANN	45	February 6, 2022 – January 29, 2023	Original series
270	Soaring Sky! Pretty Cure	Koji Ogawa	ANN	50	February 5, 2023 – January 28, 2024	Original series
271	Tōsōchū: The Great Mission	Yukio Kaizawa; Kōhei Kureta	Fuji TV	97	April 2, 2023 – March 30, 2025	
272	Oshiri Tantei (Season 7)	Hiroki Shibata	NHK	8	April 8 – May 27, 2023	
273	Ikimono-san	Atsushi Wada	TBS	12	July 8 – September 30, 2023	Co-production with Studio Deer
274	Oshiri Tantei (Season 8)	Hiroki Shibata	NHK	7	October 7 – November 18, 2023	
275	Power of Hope: PreCure Full Bloom	Takayuki Hamana	NHK Educational TV	12	October 7 – December 23, 2023	Co-production with Studio Deen
276	Le Collège Noir	Ulysse Malassagne	ADN	6	October 31, 2023 – November 14, 2023	Co-production with Studio La Cachette
277	Wonderful PreCure!	Masanori Sato	ANN	50	February 4, 2024 – January 26, 2025	Original series
278	Oshiri Tantei (Season 9)	Hiroki Shibata	NHK	5	April 6, 2024 – present	
279	Girls Band Cry	Kazuo Sakai	Tokyo MX	13	April 6 – June 29, 2024	
280	Dragon Ball Daima	Yoshitaka Yashima; Aya Komaki	Fuji TV	20	October 11, 2024 – February 28, 2025	
281	Witchy Pretty Cure!! Mirai Days	Takayuki Hamana	ANN	12	January 11 – March 30, 2025	Sequel to Witchy Pretty Cure!. Co-production with Studio Deen.
282	You and Idol Pretty Cure	Chiaki Kon	ANN	49	February 2, 2025 – January 25, 2026	Original series
283	Digimon Beatbreak	Hiroaki Miyamoto	Fuji TV	49	October 5, 2025 – September 27, 2026	
284	Star Detective Precure!	Koji Kawasaki	ANN	31	February 1, 2026 – present	Original series
285	Dragon Ball Super: Beerus	Matsuto Seya	Fuji TV	6	October 11, 2026 – present	
286	Gosu	TBA	TBA	TBA	TBA	Co-production with Studio Mir and Studio N

== Television films and specials ==
Show	Broadcast network	Year	Duration	Alternate title	Notes
King of the World: The King Kong Show	NET	December 31, 1966	56	Sekai no Ōja: Kingu Kongu Taikai	Pilot episode of The King Kong Show dubbed into Japanese; produced with Videocraft International
Captain Future: The Great Race in the Solar System	NHK	December 31, 1978	58	Captain Future: Kareinaru Taiyoukei Race	Sequel of Captain Future
Ashita no Eleven-tachi	Nippon TV	January 7, 1979	70	Tomorrow's Eleven	
Pink Lady Monogatari: Eiko no Tenshi-tachi		June 19 – June 26, 1979	25	Pink Lady Story: Angels of Glory	
Daikyouryuu no jidai	Nippon TV	July 10, 1979	71	Age of the Great Dinosaurs	
Jean Valjean Monogatari	Fuji TV	September 15, 1979	69	Les Misérables	Adapted from the novel of the same name by Victor Hugo; aired as part of Fuji TV's "Nissei Family Special"
Galaxy Express 999: Can You Live Like a Warrior!!	Fuji TV	October 11, 1979	93	Ginga Tetsudo 999: Kimi wa Senshi no You ni Ikirareru ka!!	Retelling of episodes 12 and 13 "The Fossilized Warrior – Part 1" and "The Fossilized Warrior – Part 2" from the original series
Galaxy Express 999: Emeraldes the Eternal Wanderer	Fuji TV	April 3, 1980	48	Ginga Tetsudo 999: Eien no Tabibito Emeraldas	Retelling of episode 22 "The Pirate Ship Queen Emeraldes" from the original series
Wakakusa Monogatari	Fuji TV	May 3, 1980	68	Little Women	Adapted from the novel of the same name by Louisa May Alcott; aired as part of Fuji TV's "Nissei Family Special"
Yami no Teiō: Kyūketsuki Dracula	TV Asahi	August 19, 1980	94	The Emperor of Darkness: The Vampire Dracula	Adapted from the Marvel Comics series The Tomb of Dracula
Ikkyū-san: Ōabare no Yancha-hime	TV Asahi	August 25, 1980	49	Ikkyu-san: The rampaging mischievous princess	
Galaxy Express 999: Can You Love Like a Mother!!	Fuji TV	October 2, 1980	93	Ginga Tetsudo 999: Kimi wa Haha no You ni Aiseru ka!!	Retelling of episodes 51 and 52 "Artemis of the Transparent Sea – Part 1" and "Artemis of the Transparent Sea – Part 2" from the original series
Arano no Sakebi Koe: Howl, Buck	Fuji TV	January 3, 1981	66	The Call of the Wild: Howl, Buck	Adapted from the novel The Call of the Wild by Jack London; aired as part of Fuji TV's "Nissei Family Special"
Hashire Melos!	Fuji TV	February 7, 1981	67	Run Melos!	Adapted from the short story "Run, Melos!" by Osamu Dazai; aired as part of Fuji TV's "Nissei Family Special"
Lupin tai Holmes	Fuji TV	May 5, 1981	65	Lupin vs. Holmes	Adapted from the novel Arsène Lupin versus Herlock Sholmes by Maurice Leblanc; aired as part of Fuji TV's "Nissei Family Special"
Summer Vacation Popular Anime Festival: Arale-chan's Family Appears!! Who is Queen Millennia?!	Fuji TV	July 25, 1981	46	Natsuyasumi Ninki Anime Matsuri: Arare-chan!! Sen-nen Joō no Shōtai wa?!	First Dr. Slump special and crossover of Dr. Slump Arale-chan and Queen Millennia; features the Dr. Slump special segment "Dr. Slump and Arale-chan: Huh!? Penguin Village Through the TV Jack" ("Dr. Suranpu Arare-chan: ayaya!? Pengin mura de terebijakku") and a brief recap through the first ten episodes of the Queen Millennia series
Kyoufu Densetsu Kaiki! Frankenstein	TV Asahi	July 27, 1981	89	The Mysterious Legend of Horror! Frankenstein	Adapted from the Marvel Comics series The Monster of Frankenstein
Kabo-Encho no Dobutsuen Nikki	Fuji TV	August 23, 1981	75	The Kaba Garden Director's Zoo Diary	Aired as part of Fuji TV's "Nissei Family Special"
Bokura Mangaka: Tokiwa-so Monogatari	Fuji TV	October 3, 1981	72	Our Manga Artists: The Story of Tokiwa-so	Aired as part of Fuji TV's "Nissei Family Special"
Dr. Slump Arale-chan Special	Fuji TV	October 7, 1981	24	Dr. Suranpu Arare-chan Supesharu	Second Dr. Slump special; features the three respective segments "Penguin Village SOS!!" ("Pengin mura SOS!!"), "Affairs of the Heart!" ("Hāto de shōbu!") and "Anything is OK, Mr. Handy" (" Nandemo OK Ōcha-kun")
Dr. Suranpu Arare-chan: Pengin mura eiyū densetsu	Fuji TV	January 2, 1982	46	Dr. Slump Arale-chan Special: The Legend of Penguin Village's Heroes	
I Am a Cat	Fuji TV	February 17, 1982	73	Wagahai wa Neko de Aru	Adapted from the novel of the same name by Natsume Sōseki; aired as part of Fuji TV's "Nissei Family Special"
Ginga Tetsudou 999: Shounen no Tabidachi to Wakare	Fuji TV	April 5, 1982	24	Galaxy Express 999: The Boy's Departure and Parting	
Jugo Shōnen Hyōryūki	Fuji TV	August 22, 1982	63	Adrift in the Pacific	Adapted from the novel Two Years' Vacation by Jules Verne; aired as part of Fuji TV's "Nissei Family Special"
Andoromeda Sutōrīzu	Nippon TV	August 22, 1982	84	Andromeda Stories	Adapted from the manga of the same name by Ryu Mitsuse and Keiko Takemiya; aired as part of Nippon TV's 24 Hour Television "Love Saves the Earth" charity program
Shonen Miyamoto Musashi: Winpaku Nito-ryu	Fuji TV	October 6, 1982	63	Musashi Miyamoto, the boy	Aired as part of Fuji TV's "Nissei Family Special"
Ai no Kiseki: Doctor Norman Monogatari	TV Asahi	December 24, 1982	85	The Miracle of Love: The Doctor Norman Story	Co-produced with Kokusai Eiga-sha
The Kabocha Wine: Ore to Aitsu no Shinkon Ryokou!?	TV Asahi	December 27, 1982	49	The Pumpkin Wine: My Honeymoon with Him?	
I Am a Dog: The Life of Don Matsugoro	Fuji TV	February 9, 1983	72	Wagahai wa Inu de Aru: Don Matsugorou no Seikatsu	Aired as part of Fuji TV's "Nissei Family Special"
Doctor Mambo & Kaito Jibako: Uchu Yori Ai no Komete!!	Fuji TV	September 12, 1983	84	Doctor Mambo and Thief Jibako: From Space with Love	Adapted from the manga Panku Ponk by Morio Kita; aired as part of Fuji TV's "Nissei Family Special"
Kinnikuman: Showdown! The 7 Justice Supermen vs. The Space Samurais	Nippon TV	April 7, 1984	72	Kinnikuman: Kessen! Shichinin no Seigi Choujin vs Uchuu Nobushi	
Akumatō no Purinsu: Mitsume ga Tōru	Nippon TV	August 25, 1985	79	The Prince of Devil Island: The Three-Eyed One	Adapted from the manga The Three-Eyed One by Osamu Tezuka; aired as part of Nippon TV's 24 Hour Television "Love Saves the Earth" charity program
Saint Elmo – Hikari no Raihousha	Yomiuri TV	December 31, 1987	65	Saint Elmo – Apostle of Light	Originally aired in April 1986 to coincide with the 35th anniversary of the Kansai Electric Power Company, who sponsored and produced the film; Leiji Matsumoto was credited for the film's development, even though he had nothing to do with its inception. Distributed by the Mainichi Movie Company
Dragon Ball: Goku's Fire Brigade		June 8, 1988	12	Doragon Bōru: Gokū no shōbō tai	
Dragon Ball: Goku's Traffic Safety		June 8, 1988	12	Doragon Bōru: Gokū no kōtsū anzen	
Mahoutsukai Sally: Majo no Natta Yoshiko-chan	TV Asahi	January 1 – December 24, 1990	46	Mahoutsukai Sally Specials	
Dragon Ball Z: A Lonesome, Final Battle – The Father of Z Warrior Son Goku, who Challenged Frieza	Fuji TV	October 17, 1990	47	Doragon Bōru Zetto Tatta Hitori no Saishū Kessen ~Furīza ni Idonda Zetto-senshi Son Gokū no Chichi	Released in the U.S. as Bardock: The Father of Goku
Kaette kita Dr. Suranpu Arare-chan supesharu	Fuji TV	December 31, 1990	72	Dr. Slump and Arale-chan Returns Special	
Dr. Suranpu Arare-chan '92 oshōgatsu supesharu	Fuji TV	January 1 – January 3, 1992	28	Dr. Slump: Arale-chan '92 New Year Special	
Dragon Ball Z: Extreme Battle!! The Three Great Super Saiyans – Special	Fuji TV	July 11, 1992	43	Doragon Bōru Zetto Kyokugen Batoru!! San Dai Sūpā Saiya-jin Supesharu	Release simultaneously with Dragon Ball Z: Super Android 13!
Dragon Ball Z: Defiance in the Face of Despair!! The Remaining Super-Warriors: Gohan and Trunks	Fuji TV	February 24, 1993	48	Doragon Bōru Zetto Zetsubō e no Hankō!! Nokosareta Chō-Senshi•Gohan to Torankusu	Released in the U.S. as The History of Trunks
Bishoujo Senshi Sailor Moon R: Make Up! Sailor Senshi		December 5, 1993	17	Sailor Moon R: Make Up! Sailor Guardians	Release simultaneously with Sailor Moon R: The Movie – The Promise of the Rose
Looking Back at it All: The Dragon Ball Z Year-End Show!	Fuji TV	December 31, 1993	5	Dragon Ball Z: Zenbu Misemasu Toshi Wasure Dragon Ball Z!	
Slam Dunk: Ketsui no Shouhoku Basket-bu	TV Asahi	April 9, 1994	47	The Determined Shohoku Basketball Team	
Pretty Soldier Sailor Moon SuperS Special	TV Asahi	April 8, 1995	16	Bishōjo Senshi Sērā Mūn Sūpāzu Supesharu	Special aired in between episodes 131 and 132 of the series respectively; features the three respective segments "A Beautiful Transformation? The Journey and Growth of the Crybaby Usagi", "Haruka and Michiru Return: The Ghostly Puppet Play" and "Chibiusa's Adventure: The Vampire Mansion of Terror"
Bishoujo Senshi Sailor Moon SuperS Gaiden: Ami-chan no Hatsukoi	TV Asahi	December 23, 1995	15	Sailor Moon SuperS Plus: Ami's First Love	Release simultaneously with Sailor Moon Supers the Movie: Black Dream Hole
Dragon Ball GT: Goku's Side Story! Si Xing Qiu is a Testament to Courage	Fuji TV	March 26, 1997	44	Doragon Bōru Jī Tī: Gokū Gaiden! Yūki no Akashi wa Sūshinchū	Released in the U.S. as A Hero's Legacy
Kindaichi Shounen no Jikenbo: Shinigami Byouin Satsujin Jiken		April 27, 1997	48	Shinigami Hospital Murder	
Dokutā Suranpu Supesharu	Fuji TV	April 1, 1998	45	Doctor Slump Special	Seventh Dr. Slump special; features the two respective segments "Robot Showdown! Emergency Dr. Mashirito Appears" and "A Kiin Win! Penguin Grand Prix"
Dr. Slump: Hoyoyo! Arale no Himitsu Dai Koukai da yo!!		September 15, 1999	24	Doctor Slump: Hoyoyo! Arale's secret is revealed!!	
One Piece: Kinkyuu Kikaku One Piece Kanzen Kouryakuhou		December 22, 1999	24	One Piece: Emergency Planning, A Perfect Strategy for the One Piece	
One Piece TV Special: Adventure in the Ocean's Navel	Fuji TV	December 20, 2000	49	Wan Pīsu Terebi Supesharu: Umi no Heso no Daibōken	
One Piece: Jango no Dance Carnival		March 3, 2001	6	One Piece: Django's Dance Carnival	
Saint Seiya Recap		January 25, 2003	25	Saint Seiya: Summary	
One Piece: Open Upon the Great Sea! A Father's Huge, HUGE Dream!	Fuji TV	April 6, 2003	46	Wan Pīsu: Daiunabara ni Hirake! Dekkai Dekkai Chichi no Yume!	
Kanon Kazahana	Fuji TV	May 3, 2003	20	Kanon: Wind Flower	
Super Bear-san	Animax	June 1, 2003	25	Super Kuma-san	Short produced for the 1st installment of the variety program "Animax Grand Prize"
One Piece: Protect! The Last Great Stage	Fuji TV	December 14, 2003	45	Wan Pīsu: Mamoru! Saigo no Daibutai	
Bobobo-bo Bo-bobo Recap		October 23, 2004	24	Bobobo-bo Bo-bobo Episode 32.5	
Digital Monster X-Evolution	Fuji TV	January 3, 2005	77	Dejitaru Monsutā Zevoryūshon	First Digimon project outside of the television series; co-production with Imagi Animation Studios
One Piece: End-of-Year Special Plan! Chief Straw Hat Luffy's Detective Story	Fuji TV	December 18, 2005	42	Wan Pīsu: Nenmatsu Tokubetsu Kikaku! Mugiwara no Rufi Oyabun Torimonochō	
One Piece: Otoshidama Special – Tokubetsu Hou Mugiwara Kaizokudan no Himitsu!		January 3, 2006	84	One Piece: New Year's Special – The Secret of the Straw Hat Pirates!	
Lily and Frog and Little Brother	Animax	August 20, 2006	27	Lily to Kaeru to Otōto	Short produced for the 4th installment of the variety program "Animax Grand Prize"
Saint Seiya: Gold Saints Data File		December 15, 2006 – February 16, 2007	5	Seitōshi seiya: gōrudo seinto DATA FILE	
Air Gear Special		March 21, 2007	23	Air Gear: Special Trick	
Digimon Savers: Agumon! Gaomon! Lalamon! Bakuretsu! Jougai Last Battle!		August 24, 2007	23	Digimon Savers Special: Agumon! Gaomon! Lalamon! Explosion! The Last Battle Off-screen	
Kindaichi Case Files Special	Yomiuri TV	November 12 – November 19, 2007	48	Kindaichi Shounen no Jikenbo Specials	Including The Case of the Vampire Legend Murder and The Last Opera House Murders
Dragon Ball: Yo! The Return of Son-Goku and Friends!!		September 21, 2008	34	Dragon Ball: Ossu! Kaettekita Son Gokuu to Nakama-tachi!!	
Precure All Stars GoGo Dream Live!		November 8, 2008	5	Pretty Cure All Stars GoGo Dream Live!	
Marie & Gali Episode Zero		November 8, 2008	5	Marī & garī	
Marie & Gali Special		June 2, 2009	4	Marī & garī	
Nougyou Musume!	Animax	October 7, 2010	3	Nōgyō musume! Purojekuto	
Dragon Ball Z Kai: Bring Peace to the Future! Goku's Spirit is Eternal	Fuji TV	August 2, 2011	23	Dragon Ball Kai: Mirai ni Heiwa wo! Goku no Tamashii yo Eien ni	
One Piece: Episode of Alabasta – Prologue		August 20, 2011	15	Gekijō-ban wanpīsu: episōdo obu arabasuta	Release simultaneously with One Piece: The Desert Princess and the Pirates: Adventures in Alabasta
Dragon Ball: Episode of Bardock		December 17, 2011	19	Doragon bōru: episōdo Obu bādakku	
Yama ni Kagayaku: Guide-ken Heiji Gou		April 21, 2012	28	Yama ni kagayaku gaido inu heijigō	
One Piece: Episode of Nami – Tears of a Navigator, and the Bonds of Friends	Fuji TV	August 25, 2012	106	Wan Pīsu: Episōdo obu Nami: Kōkaishi no Namida to Nakama no Kizuna	
One Piece: Episode of Luffy – Adventure on Hand Island	Fuji TV	December 15, 2012	102	Wan Píszu: Episōdo obu Rufi – Hando Airando no Bōken	
Dream 9 Toriko & One Piece & Dragon Ball Z Super Collaboration Special!!	Fuji TV	April 7, 2013		Dorīmu 9 Toriko & Wan Pīsu & Doragon Bōru Zetto Chō korabo supesharu!!	Crossover special between Toriko, One Piece, and Dragon Ball series.
One Piece: Episode of Merry – The Tale of One More Friend	Fuji TV	August 24, 2013	106	Wan Píszu: Episōdo obu Merī: Mō Hitori no Nakama no Monogatari	
Kyousou Giga Recaps	Tokyo MX	October 3 – December 26, 2013	26	Kyōsōgiga	
Robot Girls Z	Toei Channel	January 4 – March 2, 2014	27	Robotto gāruzu Z	
Robot Girls Z Specials		June 13 – August 8, 2014	9	Robotto gāruzu Z	
One Piece 3D2Y: Overcome Ace's Death! Luffy's Vow to his Friends	Fuji TV	August 30, 2014	107	Wan Píszu Surī-Dī Tsū-Wai: Ēsu no Shi o Koete! Rufi Nakama to no Chikai	
One Piece: Episode of Sabo – Bond of Three Brothers		August 22, 2015	106	Wan Píszu: Episōdo obu Sabo: San-Kyōdai no Kizuna – Kiseki no Saikai to Uketsugareru Ishi	
One Piece: Long Ring Long Land Arc	Fuji TV	December 11, 2015	75	One Piece: Long Ring Long Land-hen	A 75-minute recap of episodes 207–219, covering the Long Ring Long Land Arc. It was only aired once and was never released on home video.
One Piece: Adventure of Nebulandia	Fuji TV	December 19, 2015	106	Wan Píszu: Adobenchā Obu Neburandia	
Kindaichi Case Files Returns: The File of Inspector Akechi		December 26, 2015	47	Kindaichi Shounen no Jikenbo Returns 2nd Season: Akechi Keibu no Jikenbo	
One Piece: Heart of Gold	Fuji TV	July 16, 2016	104	Wan Píszu: Hāto obu Gōrudo	Prologue of One Piece Film: Gold
KADO: The Right Answer – Ekwari		May 19, 2017	23	Seikaisuru Kado: Ekwari	
One Piece – Episode of East Blue: Luffy and His Four Crewmates' Great Adventure		August 26, 2017	106	Wan Píszu: Episōdo obu Īsuto Burū: Rufi to Yo-nin no Nakama no Dai-bōken	
Medama Oyaji no April Fools'	Fuji TV	April 1, 2018	2	Medama oyaji no eipuriru fūru	
One Piece – Episode of Skypiea		August 25, 2018	105	Wan Píszu: Episōdo obu Sorajima	
Dragon Ball Super: Broly – Skytree Super		November 1, 2018	4	Doragon bōru chō sūpā: burorī chō tenkū-tō	
Dragon Quest: Dai no Daibouken: Bouken no Kiseki, Kore kara no Tabiji		June 26, 2021	24	Dragon Quest: The Adventure of Dai: The Trail of Adventure, The Path Forward	
One Piece: Barto's Secret Room		December 26, 2021 – October 8, 2023	23	One Piece: Barto no Himitsu no Heya!	
Digimon Ghost Game Recap		May 8, 2022	23	Dejimon gōsuto gēmu	
DEathMAtCH: Real ni Koishiteru		June 11, 2022	3	Geinin Anime Kantoku	Co-produced with Orange
Usagi		June 11, 2022	3	Usagi	Co-produced with Orange
Over the Rainbow		June 11, 2022	3	OVER THE RAINBOW	Co-produced with Orange
One Piece: A Comprehensive Anatomy! The Legend of Kozuki Oden!		June 26, 2022	24	One Piece: Dai Tettei Kaibou! Kouzuki Oden Densetsu!	
One Piece: The Captain's Log of the Legend! Red-Haired Shanks!		August 28, 2022	24	One Piece: Densetsu no Log! Akagami no Shanks!	
One Piece: A Comprehensive Anatomy! Fierce Fight! The Five from the New Generation		October 9, 2022	24	One Piece: Dai Tettei Kaibou! Gekitou! 5-nin no Shin Sedai	
One Piece: Recapping Fierce Fights! Straw Hats vs. Tobi Roppo		December 25, 2022	24	One Piece: Dai Gekisen Tokushuu! Mugiwara no Ichimi vs. Tobi Roppou	
One Piece: Recapping Fierce Fights! Zoro vs. a Lead Performer!		May 14, 2023	24	One Piece: Dai Gekisen Tokushuu! Zoro vs. Ookanban!	
One Piece: Recapping Fierce Fights! The Countercharge Alliance vs. Big Mom		June 18, 2023	24	One Piece: Dai Gekisen Tokushuu! Hangeki Doumei vs. Big Mom	
One Piece: A Very Special Feature! Momonosuke's Road to Becoming a Great Shogun		December 24, 2023	24	One Piece: Dai Tokushuu! Momonosuke no Mei Shogun e no Michi	
One Piece: A Project to Fully Enjoy! 'Surgeon of Death' Trafalgar Law		February 4, 2024	24	One Piece: Dai Tannou Kikaku! "Shi no Gekai" Trafalgar Law	
One Piece: The Log of the Rivalry! The Straw Hats vs. Cipher Pol		April 14, 2024	24	One Piece: Innen no Log! Mugiwara no Ichimi to Cipher Pol	

== Theatrical films ==
Film	Director(s)	Year	Duration	Alternate title	Notes
Kitty's Graffiti	Taiji Yabushita; Yasuji Mori	May 13, 1957	13	Koneko no Rakugaki	short; Toei's inaugural animated production
Yumemi Douji		April 5, 1958	15	Yumemi dōji	short
The White Snake Enchantress	Taiji Yabushita	October 22, 1958	79	Hakujaden	feature. Toei's animated feature debut; adapted from the Chinese tale Legend of the White Snake
Kitty's Studio	Yasuji Mori	April 9, 1959	16	Koneko no Studio	short
The Raccoon Gets Lucky	George M. Reed; Masao Kumakawa	July 7, 1959	15	Tanuki-san Ochi	short
Magic Boy	Akira Daikubara; Taiji Yabushita	December 25, 1959	82	Shōnen Sarutobi Sasuke	feature; adapted from the Japanese tale Sarutobi Sasuke
Alakazam the Great	Daisaku Shirakawa; Taiji Yabushita	August 14, 1960	88	Saiyūki	feature; adapted from the novel Journey to the West by Wu Cheng'en
The Orphan Brother	Taiji Yabushita; Yūgo Serikawa	July 19, 1961	83	Anju to Zushiômaru	feature
Tanoshii Bunmeishi: Tetsu Monogatari	Isao Takahata (assistant director)	April 22, 1962	25	Tanoshī bunmei-shi tetsu monogatari	short
Arabian Nights: The Adventures of Sinbad	Taiji Yabushita; Yoshio Kuroda	June 16, 1962	81	Arabian naito: Shindobaddo no bôken	feature; adapted from the story from The Book of One Thousand and One Nights
Mogura no Motoro	Hiroshi Ikeda	July 19, 1962	13	Motoro the Mole	short
Wanpaku Ōji no Orochi Taiji	Yūgo Serikawa	March 24, 1963	86	The Little Prince and the Eight-Headed Dragon	feature
Ookami Shounen Ken		December 21, 1963	25	Ōkami shōnen ken	short
Doggie March	Akira Daikubara	December 21, 1963	81	Wanwan Chūshingura	feature; adapted from the story of the forty-seven rōnin from Chūshingura
Ookami Shounen Ken: Arabia no Kaijin – Ma no Iwa no Kettou		March 22, 1964	50	Ōkami shōnen ken: Arabia no kaijin ma no iwa no kettō	feature
Shounen Ninja Kaze no Fujimaru: Nazo no Arabiya Ningyou		July 21, 1964	55	Shōnen'ninja kaze no fujimaru: nazo no arabiya ningyō	feature
Gulliver's Travels Beyond the Moon	Yoshio Kuroda	March 20, 1965	80	Garibā no Uchū Ryokō	feature; adapted from the novel Gulliver's Travels by Jonathan Swift
Cyborg 009	Yūgo Serikawa	July 21, 1966	65	Saibōgu Zero-Zero-Nain	feature
Tanuki-san Ooatari		March 19, 1967	15	Tanuki-san ōatari	short
Jack and the Witch	Taiji Yabushita	March 19, 1967	80	Shōnen Jakku to Mahōtsukai	feature
Cyborg 009: Monster Wars	Yūgo Serikawa	March 19, 1967	60	Saibōgu Zero-Zero-Nain: Kaijū Sensō	feature
The Madcap Island	Taiji Yabushita	July 21, 1967	65	Hyokkori hyôtan-jima	feature
The World of Hans Christian Andersen	Kimio Yabuki	March 19, 1968	80	Andersen Monogatari	feature; adapted from the fairy tales Thumbelina, The Ugly Duckling, The Little Match Girl and The Red Shoes by Hans Christian Andersen
The Great Adventure of Horus, Prince of the Sun	Isao Takahata	July 21, 1968	82	Taiyō no Ōji Horusu no Daibōken	feature; served as the directorial debut of Isao Takahata
Hitoribocchi	Yoshio Takami	March 18, 1969	25	Hitori botchi	short
Puss in Boots	Kimio Yabuki	March 18, 1969	80	Nagagutsu o Haita Neko	feature; adapted from the fairy tale of the same name by Charles Perrault
Himitsu no Akko-chan: Circus Da Ga Yattekita		March 18, 1969		The Secrets of Akko-chan: The Circus Troupe Has Arrived	short; Episode 3 "The Circus Troupe Has Arrived" expanded for theatrical release
Flying Phantom Ship	Hiroshi Ikeda	July 20, 1969	60	Soratobu Yūreisen	feature
Chuuchuu Banban		March 17, 1970	25	Chuu chuu banban	short
Chibikko Rémi to Meiken Capi	Yūgo Serikawa	March 17, 1970	81	Little Rémi and Famous Dog Capi	feature; adapted from the novel Sans Famille by Hector Malot
Tiger Mask	Takeshi Tamiya	March 17, 1970	47	Taigā Masuku	feature
Tiger Mask: War Against the League of Masked Wrestlers	Takeshi Tamiya	July 19, 1970	53	Taigā Masuku: Fuku Men League Sen	feature
30,000 Miles Under the Sea	Takeshi Tamiya	July 19, 1970	59	Kaitei San-man Mile	feature
Mōretsu Atarō: Nyarome no Komoriuta		July 19, 1970		Extraordinary Atarō: Nyarome's Lullaby	short; Episode 63 "Nyarome's Lullaby" expanded for theatrical release
Himitsu no Akko-chan: Namida no Kaiten Receive		July 19, 1970		The Secrets of Akko-chan: A Rotating Receive of Tears	short; Episode 77 "A Rotating Receive of Tears" expanded for theatrical release
Animal Treasure Island	Hiroshi Ikeda	March 20, 1971	78	Dōbutsu Takarajima	feature; adapted from the novel Treasure Island by Robert Louis Stevenson
Ali Baba and the Forty Thieves	Hiroshi Shidara	July 18, 1971	55	Ari Baba to Yonjuppiki no Tōzoku	feature; adapted from the story from The Book of One Thousand and One Nights
The Little Match Girl		December 12, 1971	18	Match Uri no Shoujo	short
The Three Musketeers in Boots	Tomoharu Katsumata	March 18, 1972	52	Nagagutsu Sanjūshi	feature
Sarutobi Ecchan		March 18, 1972			short; Episode 1 "Strange Transfer Student" expanded for theatrical release
Go Get Them 0011	Takeshi Tamiya	July 16, 1972	50	Maken Liner 0011 Henshin Seyo!	feature
Panda no Daibōken	Yūgo Serikawa	March 17, 1973	53	The Panda's Great Adventure	feature
Mazinger Z		March 17, 1973		Majingā Zetto	short; Episode 5 "Ghost Mazinger Appears" expanded for theatrical release
Babiru Ni-sei		March 17, 1973		Babel II	short; Episode 2 "The Horror Rock Giant Goriki" expanded for theatrical release
Mazinger Z Vs. Devilman	Tomoharu Katsumata	July 18, 1973	43	Majingā Zetto tai Debiruman	feature
Babiru Ni-sei: Akachan wa chōnōryoku-sha		July 18, 1973		Babel II: Baby Is a Supernatural Power	short; Episode 21 "Baby Is a Supernatural Power" expanded for theatrical release
Mahōtsukai Sarī		July 18, 1973		Sally the Witch	short; Episode 89 "Banzai! Campfire" expanded for theatrical release
Kikansha Yaemon: D-goichi no Daibōken	Takeshi Tamiya	March 16, 1974	62	The Great Adventures of Kikansha Yaemon D51	feature; adapted from the picture book by Agawa Hiroyuki and Okabe Fuyuhiko
Mazinger Z Vs. Dr. Hell		March 16, 1974			short; Episode 57 "Dr. Hell's Japanese Occupation!!" expanded for theatrical release
Mazinger Z Vs. The Great General of Darkness	Nobutaka Nishizawa	July 25, 1974	43	Majingâ Zetto tai Ankoku Daishôgun	feature
Getter Robo		July 25, 1974		Gettā Robo	short; Episode 6 "Dinosaurs! Operation Tokyo Jack" expanded for theatrical release
Majokko Megu-chan		July 25, 1974		Little Meg the Witch Girl	short; Episode 1 "Here Comes the Pretty Witch" expanded for theatrical release
Great Mazinger vs. Getter Robo	Masayuki Akehi	March 21, 1975	30	Gurēto Majingā tai Gettā Robo	featurette
Kore Ga UFO Da! Sora Tobu Enban	Kazukiyo Shigeno	March 21, 1975	15	That Is a UFO! The Flying Saucer	featurette
Hans Christian Andersen's The Little Mermaid	Tomoharu Katsumata	March 21, 1975	68	Anderusen Dōwa: Ningyo Hime	feature; adapted from the fairy tale of the same name by Hans Christian Andersen
Majokko Megu-chan: Tsuki Yori No Shisha		March 21, 1975		Little Meg the Witch Girl: Messenger from the Moon	short; Episode 11 "Messenger from the Moon" expanded for theatrical release
Uchu Enban Daisenso	Yūgo Serikawa	July 21, 1975	29	The Great War of the Space Saucers	featurette
Great Mazinger vs. Getter Robo G: The Great Clash in the Sky	Masayuki Akehi	July 26, 1975	25	Gurēto Majingā tai Gettā Robo Jī Kūchū Daigekitotsu	featurette
World Famous Fairy Tale Series		October 1975 – February 1983		Sekai Meisaku Dōwa Manga Shirīzu	20 10-minutes short films released on Single-8
UFO Robot Grendizer		December 20, 1975		Yūfō Robo Gurendaizā	featurette
UFO Robo Grendizer vs. Great Mazinger	Osamu Kasai	March 20, 1976	24	Yūfō Robo Gurendaizā tai Gurēto Majingā	featurette
Puss in Boots Travels Around the World	Hiroshi Shidara	March 20, 1976	68	Nagagutsu o Haita Neko: Hachijū Nichi-kan Sekaiisshū	feature
Ikkyū-san		March 20, 1976			short; Episode 1 "Teru Teru Bozu and the Little Boy" expanded for theatrical release
Grendizer, Getter Robo G, Great Mazinger: Decisive Battle! The Monster of the Ocean	Masayuki Akehi	July 18, 1976	31	Gurendaizā Gettā Robo Jī Gurēto Majingā Kessen! Daikaijū	featurette
Ikkyū-san: Tora Taiji		July 22, 1976			short; Episode 5 "Bamboo Shoots and Tiger Extermination" expanded for theatrical release
UFO Robot Grendizer: The Red Sunset Confrontation	Tokiji Kaburaki	December 19, 1976	24	Yūfō Robo Gurendaizā: Akai Yuuhi no Taiketsu	featurette
Ikkyū-san: Oneshohime-sama		December 19, 1976			short; Episode 13 "Bedwetting and Princess" expanded for theatrical release
The Wild Swans	Nobutaka Nishizawa; Yuji Endō	March 19, 1977	62	Sekai Meisaku Douwa: Hakuchou no Õji	feature; adapted from the fairy tale of the same name by Hans Christian Andersen; first film in the "World Masterpiece Fairy Tales" series
Ikkyū-san: Chie Compare		March 19, 1977			short; Episode 2 "Manju and the Mouse" expanded for theatrical release
Wakusei Robo Danguard Ace tai Konchu Robo Gundan	Masayuki Akehi; Teruo Ishii	July 17, 1977	25	Planetary Robot Danguard Ace vs. Insect Robot Troop	featurette
Ikkyū-san to Yancha Hime	Kimio Yabuki	March 18, 1978	14	Ikkyū-san and the Mischievous Princess	short
Wakusei Robo Danguard Ace: Uchū Daikaisen	Masayuki Akehi	March 18, 1978	25	Planetary Robot Dangard Ace: The Great Space Battle	featurette
Thumbelina	Yūgo Serikawa	March 18, 1978	64	Sekai Meisaku Douwa: Oyayubi-hime	feature; adapted from the fairy tale of the same name by Hans Christian Andersen; second film in the "World Masterpiece Fairy Tales" series
Candy Candy: The Call of Spring	Yoshikatsu Kasai	March 18, 1978	25	Candy Candy: Haru no Yobigoe	featurette
Candy Candy: Candy's Summer Vacation	Yoshikatsu Kasai	July 22, 1978	18	Candy Candy: Candy no Natsu Yasumi	Short; featurette
Space Pirate Captain Harlock: Mystery of the Arcadia	Rintarō	July 22, 1978	35	Uchū Kaizoku Captain Harlock: Arcadia Go no Nazo	feature
SF Saiyuki Starzinger	Sukehiro Tomita	March 17, 1979	22	Sci-Fi Journey to the West Starzinger: The Movie	featurette
Taro the Dragon Boy	Kirio Urayama	March 17, 1979	75	Tatsu no ko Tarō	feature; adapted from the novel of the same name by Miyoko Matsutani
Triton of the Sea	Kazunori Tanahashi	April 4, 1979 – May 21, 1984	74	Umi no Toriton	feature; compilation film of select episodes from the TV series adapted from the manga of the same name by Osamu Tezuka that ran from 1972
The Mouse's Marriage	Daisaku Shirakawa; Sadao Tsukioka	July 29, 1979	13	Mouse no Yomeiri	short
Galaxy Express 999	Rintarō	August 4, 1979	c128	Ginga Tetsudō 999; a.k.a. Bonjour Galaxy Express 999	feature
Hana no Ko Lunlun	Hiroshi Shidara	March 15, 1980	14	Hello Cherry Garden	featurette
Galaxy Express 999: Glass-made Claire	Nobutaka Nishizawa	March 15, 1980	15	Ginga Tetsudō 999: Glass no Clair	featurette
Twelve Months	Yūgo Serikawa	March 15, 1980	65	Sekai Meisaku Dōwa: Mori wa Ikiteiru	feature; co-produced with Soyuzmultfilm; adapted from the fairy tale of the same name by Božena Němcová; third film in the "World Masterpiece Fairy Tales" series
Crazy Monkey		April 19, 1980	1	Kurējī monkī	short
Toward the Terra	Hideo Onchi	April 26, 1980	111	Terra e...	feature; adapted from the manga of the same name by Keiko Takemiya
GeGeGe no Kitarō: The Divining Eye		July 12, 1980	12	Gegege no kitarō: chisōgan	short; Series 2, Episode 37 "The Geomorphic Eye" expanded for theatrical release
Lalabel, The Magical Girl: The Sea Calls for a Summer Vacation	Hiroshi Shidara	July 12, 1980	15	Mahō Shōjo Raraberu: Umi ga Yobu Natsuyatsumi	featurette
Yamato yo Towa ni	Leiji Matsumoto; Tomoharu Katsumata; Toshio Masuda	August 2, 1980	145	Be Forever Yamato	feature
Cyborg 009 The Movie: Legend of the Super Galaxy	Masayuki Akehi	December 20, 1980	129	Saibōgu Zero-Zero-Nain Gekijōban: Chō Ginga Densetsu	feature
Adieu Galaxy Express 999: Andromeda Terminal Station	Rintarō	January 8, 1981	130	Sayonara Ginga Tetsudō 999: Andromeda Shuchakueki	feature
Ikkyū-san: Haru Da! Yancha Hime	Kimio Yabuki	March 14, 1981	15	Ikkyū-san: It's Spring! Mischievous Princess	short
Swan Lake	Kimio Yabuki	March 14, 1981	75	Sekai Meisaku Dōwa: Hakuchō no Mizuumi	feature; adapted from the ballet by Pyotr Ilyich Tchaikovsky; fourth film in the "World Masterpiece Fairy Tales" series
Akuma to Himegimi	Ryousuke Takahashi	March 20, 1981	31	Akuma to himegimi	short; adapted from the manga of the same name by Akimi Yoshida
Natsu e no Tobira	Mori Masaki	March 20, 1981	59	Natsu he no tobira	feature; adapted from the manga of the same name by Keiko Takemiya
Dr. Slump and Arale-chan: Hello! Wonder Island	Minoru Okazaki	July 18, 1981	25	Dr. Suranpu arare-chan harō! Fushigi shima	short
Aladdin and the Magic Lamp	Yoshikatsu Kasai	March 13, 1982	65	Arajin to mahō no ranpu	feature; adapted from the story from The Book of One Thousand and One Nights; fifth film in the "World Masterpiece Fairy Tales" series
Queen Millennia	Masayuki Akehi	March 13, 1982	121	Kuīn mirenia	feature
Super Gal Asari: The Dreaming Girl in Fairy World	Kazumi Fukushima	March 13, 1982	24	Asari-chan ai no meruhen shōjo	short
Haguregumo	Mori Masaki; Moribi Murano (Assassination Sequence)	April 24, 1982	91	Haguregumo	feature; co-produced with Madhouse; adapted from the manga of the same name by George Akiyama
Dr. Slump: "Hoyoyo!" Space Adventure	Akinori Nagaoka	July 10, 1982	90	Dr. SLUMP "ho yo yo! " Uchū dai bōken	feature
Arcadia of My Youth	Tomoharu Katsumata	July 28, 1982	130	Waga seishun'no arukadia	feature
Future War 198X	Tomoharu Katsumata; Toshio Masuda	October 30, 1982	125	Future u~ō 198 X-toshi	feature
Aesop's Fables	Norio Hikone	March 13, 1983	61	Manga Isoppu monogatari	feature
Dr. Slump and Arale-chan: Hoyoyo! The Great Race Around the World	Minoru Okazaki	March 13, 1983	52	Dr. Suranpu arare-chan ho yo yo! Sekai isshū dai rēsu	feature
Space Battleship Yamato – Final Chapter	Tomoharu Katsumata; Yoshinobu Nishizaki	March 19, 1983	175	Uchū senkan'yamato kanketsu-hen	feature
Patalliro! Stardust Keikaku	Nobutaka Nishizawa	July 10, 1983	48	Patariro! Sutādasuto keikaku	feature
Shōnen Keniya	Nobuhiko Ōbayashi	March 10, 1984	109	Shōnen keniya	feature
Papa Mama Bye bye	Hiroshi Shidara	July 8, 1984	75	Papa mama baibai	feature; adapted from the picture book of the same name by Katsumoto Saotome
Kinnikuman: Stolen Championship Belt	Takeshi Shirato	July 14, 1984	48	Kin'nikuman (Kin'nikuman ubawareta chanpion beruto)	feature
The Kabocha Wine: Nita no Aijou Monogatari	Kimio Yabuki	July 14, 1984	24	The kabocha wain Nita no aijō monogatari	featurette
Dr. Slump and Arale-chan: Hoyoyo! The Treasure of Nanaba Castle	Hiroki Shibata	December 22, 1984	48	Dr. Suranpu arare-chan ho yo yo! Nanaba-jō no hihō	feature
Kinnikuman: Great Riot! Justice Superman	Takeshi Shirato	December 22, 1984	48	Kin'nikuman dai abare! Masayoshi chōjin	feature
Arei's Mirror: Way to the Virgin Space	Kōzō Morishita	March 16, 1985	26	Arei no kagami ~ Way to the vuājin Space	short
Gu Gu Ganmo	Akinori Nagaoka	March 16, 1985	45	GU – GU ganmo	feature
Justice Supermen vs. Ancient Supermen	Yasuo Yamayoshi	March 16, 1985	45	Korumaman seigi chōjin VS kodai chōjin	feature
Tongari Bōshi no Memoru	Junichi Satō	March 16, 1985	15	Memole of the Pointed Hat	featurette
Dr. Slump and Arale-chan: Hoyoyo! City of Dreams, Mechapolis	Toyoo Ashida	July 13, 1985	38	Dr. Suranpu arare-chan ho yo yo! Yume no miyako mekaporisu	featurette
Kinnikuman: Gyakushuu! Uchuu Kakure Choujin	Yasuo Yamayoshi	July 13, 1985	38	Kin'nikuman gyakushū! Uchū kakure chōjin	feature
Odin: Starlight Mutiny	Eiichi Yamamoto; Takeshi Shirato	August 10, 1985	139	Ōdīn kōshi hansen sutāraito	feature
Kinnikuman: Haresugata! Seigi Choujin	Takenori Kawada	December 21, 1985	60	Kin'nikuman haresugata! Masayoshi chōjin	feature
Spooky Kitaro	Takeshi Shirato	December 21, 1985	24	Gegege no kitarō	featurette
The Snow Country Prince	Tomoharu Katsumata	December 21, 1985	90	Yukiguni no ōji-sama	feature; adapted from the book of the same name by Daisaku Ikeda
Fist of the North Star: The Movie	Toyoo Ashida	March 8, 1986	110	Hokuto no kobushi	feature
Kinnikuman: New York Kiki Ippatsu!	Takenori Kawada	March 15, 1986	45	Kin'nikuman nyūyōku kikiippatsu!	feature
Spooky Kitarou: Ghost War Struggle	Osamu Kasai	March 15, 1986	39	Gegege no kitarō yōkai daisensō	featurette
Maple Town Monogatari	Yukio Kaizawa	July 12, 1986	26	Meipuru taun monogatari	featurette
Spooky Kitarou: The Strongest Ghost Army! Landing in Japan!!	Yūgo Serikawa	July 12, 1986	49	Gegege no kitarō saikyō yōkai gundan! Nihon Kuga!!	featurette
Dragon Ball: Curse of the Blood Rubies	Daisuke Nishio	December 20, 1986	50	Doragon bōru shin ryū no densetsu	feature
Kinnikuman: Seigi Choujin vs. Senshi Choujin	Yasuo Yamayoshi	December 20, 1986	50	Kin'nikuman masayoshi chōjin VS senshi chōjin	feature
Spooky Kitaro: Crash!! The Great Rebellion of the Multi-Dimensional Yōkai	Hiroki Shibata	December 20, 1986	47	Gegege no kitarō gekitotsu! Ijigen yōkai no dai hanran	featurette
Shin Maple Town Monogatari: Palm Town-hen – Konnichiwa! Atarashii Machi	Hiroshi Shidara	March 14, 1987	30	Shin meipuru taun monogatari pāmutaun-hen kon'nichiwa! Atarashī machi	featurette
Grimm Douwa: Kin no Tori	Toshio Hirata	March 14, 1987	52	Grimm's Fairy Tales: The Golden Bird	feature
Dragon Ball: Sleeping Princess in Devil's Castle	Daisuke Nishio	July 18, 1987	45	Doragon Bōru: Majin-jō no Nemuri Hime	feature
Saint Seiya: Evil Goddess Eris	Kōzō Morishita	July 18, 1987	45	Seinto Seiya: Jashin Erisu	feature
Saint Seiya: Heated Battle of the Gods	Shigeyasu Yamauchi	March 12, 1988	45	Seinto Seiya: Kamigami no Atsuki Tatakai	feature
Bikkuriman: Taiichiji Seima Taisen	Hiroyuki Kakudo	March 12, 1988	30	Bikkuriman: Daiichiji Seima Taisen	featurette
Bikkuriman: Moen Zone no Himitsu	Junichi Sato	July 9, 1988	45	Bikkuriman: Muen Zone no Hihou	feature
Tatakae!! Ramenman	Masayuki Akehi	July 9, 1988	25	Toushou!! Ramenman	featurette
Dragon Ball: Mystical Adventure	Kazuhisa Takenouchi	July 9, 1988	46	Doragon Bōru: Makafushigi Dai-Bōken	feature
Saint Seiya: The Legend of Crimson Youth	Shigeyasu Yamauchi	July 23, 1988	75	Seinto Seiya: Shinku no Shōnen Densetsu	feature
Sakigake!! Otokojuku	Nobutaka Nishizawa	July 23, 1988	75	Be a Man! Samurai School	feature
Himitsu no Akko-chan	Hiroki Shibata	March 18, 1989	25	Secret Little Akko	featurette
Saint Seiya: Warriors of the Final Holy Battle	Masayuki Akehi	March 18, 1989	45	Seinto Seiya: Saishū Seisen no Senshitachi	feature
Himitsu no Akko-chan: Umi da! Obake da!! Natsu Matsuri	Hiroki Shibata	July 15, 1989		Secret Little Akko: The Sea! The Monster!! Summer Holiday	featurette
Dragon Ball Z: Return My Gohan!!	Daisuke Nishio	July 15, 1989	42	Doragon Bōru: Zetto Ora no Gohan o Kaese!!	feature
Akuma-kun	Junichi Satō	July 15, 1989	40	Devil Boy	featurette
Sally the Witch	Osamu Kasai	March 10, 1990	27	Mahōtsukai Sarī	featurette
Akuma-kun: Yōkoso Akuma Land e!!	Junichi Satō	March 10, 1990	25	Devil Boy: Welcome to Devil Land!!	featurette
Dragon Ball Z: The World's Strongest	Daisuke Nishio	March 10, 1990	58	Doragon Bōru Zetto: Kono Yo de Ichiban Tsuyoi Yatsu	feature
Dragon Ball Z: The Decisive Battle for the Whole Earth	Daisuke Nishio	July 7, 1990	65	Doragon Bōru Zetto: Chikyū Marugoto Chōkessen	feature
Pink: Water Bandit, Rain Bandit	Toyoo Ashida	July 7, 1990	31	Pink: Mizu Dorobō Ame Dorobō	featurette
Kennosuke-sama	Minoru Okazaki	July 7, 1990	20	Little Kennosuke	featurette
Dragon Ball Z: Super Saiyan Son Goku	Mitsuo Hashimoto	March 9, 1991	51	Doragon Bōru Zetto Sūpā Saiyajin da Son Gokū	feature
Magical Taluluto	Shigeyasu Yamauchi	March 9, 1991	45	Majikaru Tarurūto-kun	featurette
Dragon Ball Z: The Incredible Mightiest vs. Mightiest	Mitsuo Hashimoto	July 20, 1991	47	Doragon Bōru Zetto: Tobikkiri no Saikyō tai Saikyō	feature
Magical Taluluto: Magic Battle of the Friendship	Hiroyuki Kakudou	July 20, 1991	41	Magical Taruruto-kun Moero! Yūjō no Mahō Taisen	featurette
Dragon Quest: The Adventure of Dai	Yasuchika Nagaoka (animation director)	July 20, 1991	31	Doragon Kuesuto: Dai no Daibōken	featurette
Dragon Ball Z: Clash!! The Power of 10 Billion Warriors	Daisuke Nishio	March 7, 1992	46	Doragon Bōru Zetto Gekitotsu!! Hyaku-Oku Pawā no Senshi-tachi	feature
Magical Taluluto: My Favorite Takoyaki	Yukio Kaizawa	March 7, 1992	30	Magical Taruruto-kun Suki Suki Hot Takoyaki	featurette
Dragon Quest: The Adventure of Dai: Disciple of Avan	Hiroki Shibata	March 7, 1992	41	Doragon Kuesuto: Dai no Daibōken: Tachiagare!! Aban no Shito	featurette
Candy Candy: The Movie	Tetsuo Imazawa	March 25, 1992	26	Kyandi Kyandi	featurette
Goldfish Warning!	Junichi Sato	March 25, 1992	21	Kingyo Chūihō!	featurette
Dragon Quest: The Adventure of Dai: The Reborn Six Commanders	Nobutaka Nishizawa	July 11, 1992	39	Doragon Kuesuto: Dai no Daibōken: Buchi Yabure!! Shinsei Roku	featurette
Rokudenashi Blues	Takao Yoshisawa	July 11, 1992	30	Rokudenashi Burūsu	featurette
Dragon Ball Z: Extreme Battle!! The Three Great Super Saiyans	Kazuhito Kikuchi	July 11, 1992	46	Doragon Bōru Zetto Kyokugen Batoru!! San Dai Sūpā Saiyajin	feature
Dragon Ball Z: Burn Up!! A Close Fight – A Violent Fight – A Super Fierce Fight	Shigeyasu Yamauchi	March 6, 1993	72	Doragon Bōru Zeddo Moetsukiro!! Nessen Ressen Chō-Gekisen	feature
Dr. Slump and Arale-chan: N-cha! Clear Skies Over Penguin Village	Yukio Kaizawa	March 6, 1993	40	Dokutā Suranpu Arare-chan N-cha! Pengin-mura wa Hare nochi Hare	featurette
Dragon Ball Z: The Galaxy's at the Brink!! The Super Incredible Guy	Yoshihiro Ueda	July 10, 1993	51	Doragon Bōru Zetto: Ginga Giri-Giri!! Butchigiri no Sugoi Yatsu	feature
Dr. Slump and Arale-chan: N-cha! From Penguin Village with Love	Mitsuo Hashimoto	July 10, 1993	32	Dokutā Suranpu Arare-chan N-cha! Pengin-mura yori Ai wo Komete	featurette
Rokudenashi Blues 1993	Hiroyuki Kakudō	July 24, 1993	85	Rokudenashi Burūsu 1993	featurette
Sailor Moon R: The Movie	Kunihiko Ikuhara	December 5, 1993	62	Gekijō-ban Bishōjo Senshi Sērā Mūn Āru	feature
Make Up! Sailor Guardians		December 5, 1993	15	Meikuappu! Sērā senshi	short feature
Coo: Tōi Umi kara Kita Coo	Tetsuo Imazawa	December 19, 1993	116	Coo of the Far Seas	feature
Dr. Slump and Arale-chan: Hoyoyo!! Follow the Rescued Shark...	Mitsuo Hashimoto	March 12, 1994	25	Dokutā Suranpu Arare-chan Hoyoyo!! Tasuketa Same ni Tsurerarete...	featurette
Slam Dunk	Nobutaka Nishizawa	March 12, 1994	30	SLAM DUNK	feature
Dragon Ball Z: The Dangerous Duo! Super Warriors Never Rest	Shigeyasu Yamauchi	March 12, 1994	52	Doragon Bōru Zetto Kiken na Futari! Sūpā Senshi wa Nemurenai	feature
Dragon Ball Z: Super Warrior Defeat!! I'll Be the Winner	Yoshihiro Ueda	July 9, 1994	46	Doragon Bōru Zetto Sūpā Senshi Gekiha!! Katsu No wa Ore da	feature
Dr. Slump and Arale-chan: N-cha!! Trembling Heart of the Summer	Mitsuo Hashimoto	July 9, 1994	20	Dokutā Suranpu Arare-chan N-cha!! Wakuwaku Hāto no Natsu Yasumi	featurette
Slam Dunk: Conquer the Nation, Hanamichi Sakuragi!	Toshihiko Arisako	July 9, 1994	45	SLAM DUNK Zenkoku Seiha da! Sakuragi Hanamichi	feature
Ghost Sweeper Mikami: The Great Paradise Battle!!	Atsutoshi Umezawa	August 20, 1994	60	Gōsuto Suīpā Mikami Gokuraku Daisakusen!!	feature
Sailor Moon S: The Movie	Hiroki Shibata	December 4, 1994	61	Gekijō-ban Bishōjo Senshi Sērā Mūn Sūpā	feature
Aoki Densetsu Shoot! The Movie!	Daisuke Nishio	December 4, 1994	25	Gekijō-ban Aoki Densetsu Shūto	featurette
Dragon Ball Z: The Fusion of Rebirth!! Goku and Vegeta	Shigeyasu Yamauchi	March 4, 1995	52	Dragon Ball Z Fukkatsu no Fusion!! Gokū to Bejīta	feature
Marmalade Boy	Akinori Yabe	March 4, 1995	26	Mamarēdo Bōi	featurette
Slam Dunk: Shohoku's Greatest Challenge!	Hiroyuki Kakudō	March 12, 1995	40	SLAM DUNK Shohoku Saidai no Kiki! Moero Sakuragi Hanamichi	feature
Dragon Ball Z: Dragon Fist Explosion!! If Goku Can't Do It, Who Will?	Mitsuo Hashimoto	July 15, 1995	52	Dragon Ball Z Ryū-Ken Bakuhatsu!! Gokū ga Yaraneba Dare ga Yaru?	feature
Slam Dunk: Howling Basketman Spirit!!	Masayuki Akihi	July 15, 1995	40	SLAM DUNK Hoero Basukettoman Tamashii!! Hanamichi to Rukawa no Atsuki Natsu	feature
Sailor Moon SuperS: The Movie	Hiroki Shibata	December 23, 1995	62	Bishōjo Senshi Sērā Mūn Sūpāzu: Sērā Kyū Senshi Shūketsu! Burakku Dorīmu Hōru no Kiseki	feature
Sailor Moon SuperS Plus: Ami's First Love		December 23, 1995	16	Bishōjo Senshi Sērā Mūn Sūpāzu Gaiden: Ami-chan no Hatsu-koi	featurette
Dragon Ball: The Path to Ultimate Power	Shigeyasu Yamauchi	March 2, 1996	80	Doragon Bōru Saikyō e no Michi	feature
Neighborhood Story	Junji Shimizu	March 2, 1996	30	Gokinjo Monogatari	featurette
Hell Teacher Nube	Junji Shimizu	July 6, 1996	48	Jigoku Sensei Nūbē	feature
GeGeGe no Kitarō: The Great Sea Beast	Tomoharu Katsumata	July 6, 1996	50	Gegege no Kitarō: Daikaijū	featurette
The File of Young Kindaichi	Daisuke Nishio	December 14, 1996	95	Kindaichi Shōnen no Jikenbo	feature
GeGeGe no Kitarō: The Obake Nighter	Junichi Satō	March 8, 1997	30	Gegege no Kitarō: Obake Nighter	featurette
Hell Teacher Nube: 0 a.m. Nube Dead	Yukio Kaizawa	March 8, 1997	45	Jigoku Sensei Nūbē: Gozen 0 toki Nūbē Shisu	feature
Hana yori Dango: The Movie	Shigeyasu Yamauchi	March 8, 1997	30	Gekijō-ban Hana yori Dango	feature
Hell Teacher Nube: Summer Holiday of Fear! Legend of the Sea of Suspicion	Junji Shimizu	July 12, 1997	38	Jigoku Sensei Nūbē: Kyoufu no Natsu Yasumi! Asashi no Uni no Gensetsu	featurette
GeGeGe no Kitarō: Yōkai Express! The Phantom Train	Takao Yoshizawa	July 12, 1997	23	Gegege no Kitarō: Yōkai Tokkyū! Maboroshi no Kisha	featurette
Cutie Honey Flash	Noriyo Sasaki	July 12, 1997	38	Kyūtī Hanī Furasshu	featurette
Galaxy Express 999: Eternal Fantasy	Kazuo Yamazaki	March 7, 1998	121	Ginga Tetsudō Surī Nain: Eternal Fantasy	feature
The Story of Rennyo	Osamu Kasai	April 25, 1998	86	Rennyo Monogatari	feature
Doctor Slump: Arale's Surprise Burn	Shigeyasu Yamauchi	March 6, 1999	50	Dokutā Suranpu: Arare no Bikkuri Bān	feature
Yu-Gi-Oh!	Junji Shimizu	March 6, 1999	30	Yū Gi Ō	featurette
Digimon Adventure	Mamoru Hosoda	March 6, 1999	20	Dejimon Adobenchā	featurette
The File of Young Kindaichi 2: Murder in the Deep Blue	Daisuke Nishio	August 21, 1999	91	Kindaichi Shōnen no Jikenbo 2: Satsuriku no Dīpuburū	feature
One Piece	Junji Shimizu	March 4, 2000	51	Wan Pīsu	feature
Digimon Adventure: Our War Game!	Mamoru Hosoda	March 4, 2000	40	Dejimon Adobenchā Bokura no Wō Gēmu!	featurette
Digimon Adventure 02: Digimon Hurricane Touchdown/Supreme Evolution! The Golden Digimentals	Shigeyasu Yamauchi	July 8, 2000	65	Dejimon Adobenchā Zero Tsū Dejimon Harikēn Jōriku!!/Chōzetsu Shinka!! Ōgon no Digimentaru	feature; originally presented in two parts
Ojamajo Doremi #: Pop and the Queen's Cursed Rose	Takuya Igarashi	July 8, 2000	30	Bothersome Witch Doremi Sharp	featurette
Digimon Adventure 3D: Digimon Grand Prix!	Mamoru Hosoda	July 20, 2000	7	Dejimon Adobenchā 3D Dejimon Gurandopuri!	short
One Piece: Clockwork Island Adventure	Junji Shimizu	March 3, 2001	55	Wan Pīsu: Nejimaki Shima no Bōken	feature
Digimon Adventure 02: Diaboromon Strikes Back	Takahiro Imamura	March 3, 2001	30	Dejimon Adobenchā Zero Tsū Diaboromon no Gyakushū	featurette
Digimon Tamers: Battle of Adventurers	Tetsuo Imazawa	July 14, 2001	50	Dejimon Teimāzu Bōkensha-tachi no Tatakai	feature
Kinnikuman: Second Generations	Toshiaki Komura	July 14, 2001	25	Kinnikuman II Sei	featurette
Mōtto! Ojamajo Doremi: Secret of the Frog Stone	Shigeyasu Yamauchi	July 14, 2001	30	Mo~tto! Ojamajo Doremi Kaeru Seki no Himitsu	featurette
One Piece: Chopper's Kingdom on the Island of Strange Animals	Junji Shimizu	March 2, 2002	56	Wan Pīsu: Chinjō Shima no Chopper Ōkoku	feature
Digimon Tamers: Runaway Locomon	Tetsuji Nakamura	March 2, 2002	30	Dejimon Teimāzu Bōsō Dejimon Tokkyū	featurette
Digimon Frontier: Island of Lost Digimon	Takahiro Imamura	July 20, 2002	40	Dejimon Furontia Kodai Dejimon Fukkatsu!!	featurette
Muscle Ginseng Competition! The Great Superman War	Toshiaki Komura	July 20, 2002	40	Massuru Ninjin Soudatsu! Choujin Dai Sensou	featurette
One Piece The Movie: Dead End Adventure	Kōnosuke Uda	March 1, 2003	95	Wan Pīsu za Mūbī Deddo Endo no Bōken	feature
Interstella 5555: The 5tory of the 5ecret 5tar 5ystem	Kazuhisa Takenouchi	May 28, 2003	65	Intāsutera Fō Faibu	feature
Saint Seiya: Heaven Chapter – Overture	Shigeyasu Yamauchi	February 14, 2004	85	Seinto Seiya Tenkai-hen: Josō Overture	feature
One Piece: Curse of the Sacred Sword	Kazuhisa Takenōchi	March 6, 2004	95	Wan Pīsu Norowareta Seiken	feature
Zatch Bell! Movie 1: 101st Devil	Junji Shimizu	August 7, 2004	84	Gekijou Ban Konjiki no Gash Bell!! 101 Banme no Mamono	feature
Air	Osamu Dezaki	February 5, 2005	91	Air: The Motion Picture	feature
One Piece The Movie: Baron Omatsuri and the Secret Island	Mamoru Hosoda	March 5, 2005	91	Wan Pīsu za Mūbī Omatsuri Danshaku to Himitsu no Shima	
Futari wa Pretty Cure Max Heart: The Movie	Junji Shimizu	April 16, 2005	70	Eiga Futari wa Purikyua Makkusu Hāto	feature
Zatch Bell! Movie 2: Attack of Mechavulcan	Takuya Igarashi	August 6, 2005	85	Gekijou Ban Konjiki no Gash Bell!! Mecabarukan no raishuu	feature
Futari wa Pretty Cure Max Heart 2: Friends of the Snow-Laden Sky	Junji Shimizu	December 10, 2005	71	Eiga Futari wa Purikyua Makkusu Hāto Two: Yukizora no Tomodachi	feature
One Piece: The Giant Mechanical Soldier of Karakuri Castle	Kōnosuke Uda	March 4, 2006	94	Wan Pīsu Karakuri Shiro no Mecha Kyohei	feature
Digimon Savers 3D: The Digital World in Imminent Danger!	Takanori Arisawa	July 8, 2006	7	Dejimon Saibāzu 3D Dejitaru Wārudo Kiki Ippatsu!	short
Futari wa Pretty Cure Splash☆Star: Tick-Tock Crisis Hanging by a Thin Thread!	Junji Shimizu	December 9, 2006	50	Eiga Futari wa Purikyua Supurashu Sutā Tiku Taku Kiki Ippatsu!	feature
Digimon Savers: Ultimate Power! Activate Burst Mode!!	Tatsuya Nagamine	December 9, 2006	21	Dejimon Seibāzu za Mubī Kyūkyoku Pawā! Bāsuto Mōdo Hatsudō!!	featurette
Episode of Alabasta: The Desert Princess and the Pirates	Takahiro Imamura	March 3, 2007	90	Wan Pīsu: Episōdo Obu Arabasuta: Sabaku no Ōjo to Kaizokutachi	feature
Dr. Slump: Dr. Mashirito – Abale-chan	Tatsuya Nagamine	March 3, 2007	5	Dokutā Suranpu: Doctor Mashirito Abare-chan	short
Clannad	Osamu Dezaki	September 15, 2007	90	Gekijō-ban Clannad	feature
Yes! Pretty Cure 5 The Movie: Great Miraculous Adventure in the Mirror Kingdom!	Tatsuya Nagamine	November 10, 2007		Yes! Precure 5: Kagami no Kuni no Miracle Daibōken!	feature
One Piece: Episode of Chopper Plus: Bloom in the Winter, Miracle Cherry Blossom	Junji Shimizu	March 1, 2008		Wan Pīsu: Episōdo obu Chopper + Fuyu ni Saku, Kiseki no Sakura	feature
Dragon Ball: Yo! Son Goku and His Friends Return!!	Yoshihiro Ueda	September 21, 2008	35	Doragon Bōru Ossu! Kaette Kita Son Gokū to Nakama-tachi!!	short
Yes! Pretty Cure 5 GoGo! Happy Birthday in the Land of Sweets	Tatsuya Nagamine	November 8, 2008		Yes! Precure 5 GoGo! Okashi no Kuni no Happī Bāsudi	feature
GeGeGe no Kitarō: Japan Explodes!!	Gō Koga	December 20, 2008		Gegege no Kitarō: Nippon Bakuretsu!!	feature
Pretty Cure All Stars DX: Everyone's Friends – the Collection of Miracles!	Takashi Otsuka	March 20, 2009	70	Eiga PuriKyua Ōru Sutāzu Dirakkusu: Minna Tomodachi☆Kiseki no Zenin Daishūgō	feature
Fresh Pretty Cure! The Movie: The Kingdom of Toys has Lots of Secrets!?	Junji Shimizu	October 31, 2009		Eiga Furesshu Purikyua! Omocha no Kuni wa Himitsu ga Ippai!?	feature
One Piece Film: Strong World	Munehisa Sakai	December 12, 2009	115	Wan Pīsu Firumu Sutorongu Warudo	feature
Pretty Cure All Stars DX2: Light of Hope – Protect the Rainbow Jewel!	Takashi Otsuka	March 20, 2010	70	Eiga PuriKyua Ōru Sutāzu Dirakkusu Tsū: Kibō no Hikari☆Reinbō Jueru wo Mamore!	feature
HeartCatch Pretty Cure The Movie: Fashion Show in the Flower Capital... Really?!	Rie Matsumoto	October 30, 2010	71	Heartcatch Precure! Hana no Miyako de Fashion Show...Desu ka!?	feature
Straw Hat Chase	Hiroyuki Satō	March 19, 2011	30	Wan Pīsu 3D: Mugiwara Chase	featurette
Pretty Cure All Stars DX3: Deliver the Future! The Rainbow-Colored Flower That Connects the World	Takashi Otsuka	March 19, 2011	70	Eiga Purikyua Ōru Sutāzu Dirakkusu Surī: Mirai ni Todoke! Sekai o Tsunagu Niji-Iro no Hana!	feature
Toriko 3D: Kaimaku! Gourmet Adventure!!	Junji Shimizu	March 19, 2011	40	Toriko Surīdī: Kaimaku! Gurume Adobenchā!!	feature
Buddha	Kozo Morishita	May 28, 2011	110	Budda	feature; co-produced with Tezuka Productions; adapted from the manga of the same name by Osamu Tezuka
Suite Pretty Cure♪ The Movie: Take it back! The Miraculous Melody that Connects Hearts	Yōko Ikeda	October 29, 2011	111	Eiga Suīto PuriKyua♪: Torimodose! Kokoro ga Tsunagu Kiseki no Merodi!	feature
Dragon Ball: Episode of Bardock	Yoshihiro Ueda	December 17, 2011	20	Doragon Bōru Episōdo obu Bādakku	short
Pretty Cure All Stars New Stage: Friends of the Future	Junji Shimizu	March 17, 2012	72	Eiga PuriKyua Ōru Sutāzu Nyū Sutēji: Mirai no Tomodachi	feature
Smile Pretty Cure!: Big Mismatch in a Picture Book!	Narumi Kuroda	October 27, 2012	70	Eiga Sumairu Purikyua!: Ehon no Naka wa Minna Chiguhagu!	feature
One Piece Film: Z	Tatsuya Nagamine	December 15, 2012	107	Wan Pīsu Firumu Zetto	feature
Pretty Cure All Stars New Stage 2: Friends of the Heart	Kōji Ogawa	March 16, 2013	71	Eiga PuriKyua Ōru Sutāzu Nyū Sutēji Tsū: Kokoro no Tomodachi	feature
Dragon Ball Z: God to God	Masahiro Hosoda	March 30, 2013	85	Doragon Bōru Zetto Kami to Kami	feature
Toriko the Movie: Bishokushin's Special Menu	Akifumi Zako	July 27, 2013	81	Gekijō-ban Toriko Bishokushin no Special Menu	feature
Space Pirate Captain Harlock	Shinji Aramaki	September 7, 2013	111	Uchū Kaizoku Kyaputen Hārokku	feature; co-produced with Marza Animation Planet
DokiDoki! Pretty Cure the Movie: Mana's Getting Married!!? The Dress of Hope Tied to the Future	Naoyuki Itō	October 26, 2013		Eiga DokiDoki! Purikyua: Mana Kekkon!!? Mirai ni Tsunagu Kibō no Doresu	feature
Buddha 2	Toshiaki Komura	February 8, 2014	90	Budda Tsū	feature; co-produced with Tezuka Productions; adapted from the manga of the same name by Osamu Tezuka
Pretty Cure All Stars New Stage 3: Eternal Friends	Kōji Ogawa	March 15, 2014	70	Eiga Purikyua Ōru Sutāzu Nyū Sutēji Surī: Eien no Tomodachi	feature
Saint Seiya: Legend of Sanctuary	Keiichi Sato	June 21, 2014	93	Seinto Seiya Rejendo Obu Sankuchuari	feature
HappinessCharge PreCure! the Movie: The Ballerina of the Land of Dolls	Chiaki Kon	October 11, 2014	71	Eiga HapinesuChāji PuriKyua! Ningyō no kuni no barerīna	feature
Expelled from Paradise	Seiji Mizushima	November 15, 2014	104	Rakuen Tsuihō	feature; animation services by Graphinica
Pretty Cure All Stars: Spring Carnival♪	Junji Shimizu	March 14, 2015	74	Eiga Purikyua Ōru Sutāzu: Haru no Kānibaru♪	feature
Dragon Ball Z: Resurrection 'F'	Tadayoshi Yamamuro	April 18, 2015	94	Doragon Bōru Zetto Fukkatsu no 'Efu'	feature
Go! Princess Pretty Cure the Movie: Go! Go!! Gorgeous Triple Feature!!!	Yukio Kaizawa (Cure Flora and the Mischievous Mirror); Akifumi Zako (Pumpkin Kingdom's Treasure); Hiroshi Miyamoto (Leff's Wonder Night!)	October 31, 2015	75	Eiga Gō! Purinsesu Purikyua: Gō! Gō!! Gōka San-bon Date!!!	feature; separated into three segments
Digimon Adventure Tri. -Reunion-	Keitaro Motonaga	November 21, 2015	86	Dejimon Adobenchā Torai. – Saikai	feature
Digimon Adventure Tri. -Determination-	Keitaro Motonaga	March 12, 2016	84	Dejimon Adobenchā Torai. – Ketsui	feature
Pretty Cure All Stars: Singing with Everyone♪ Miraculous Magic!	Yutaka Tsuchida	March 19, 2016	70	Eiga Purikuya Ōru Sutāzu: Minna de Utau♪Kiseki no Mahō!	feature
One Piece Film: Gold	Hiroaki Miyamoto	July 23, 2016	120	Wan Pīsu Firumu Gōrudo	feature
Digimon Adventure Tri. -Confession-	Keitaro Motonaga	September 24, 2016	101	Dejimon Adobenchā Torai. – Kokuhaku	feature
Witchy Pretty Cure! The Movie: Wonderous! Cure Mofurun!	Yuta Tanaka	October 29, 2016	70	Eiga Mahōtsukai Purikyua!: Kiseki no Henshin! Kyua Mofurun	feature
Pop in Q	Naoki Miyahara	December 23, 2016	95	PoppinQ	feature
Digimon Adventure Tri. -Loss-	Keitaro Motonaga	February 25, 2017	78	Dejimon Adobenchā Torai. – Sōshitsu	feature
Pretty Cure Dream Stars!	Hiroshi Miyamoto	March 18, 2017	70	Eiga Purikyua Dorīmu Sutāzu!	feature
Digimon Adventure Tri. -Coexistence-	Keitaro Motonaga	September 30, 2017	85	Dejimon Adobenchā Torai. – Kyōsei	feature
Mazinger Z: Infinity	Junji Shimizu	October 28, 2017	94	Gekijōban Majingā Zetto / Infiniti	feature
Kirakira Pretty Cure a la Mode the Movie: Crisply! The Memory of Mille-feuille!	Yutaka Tsuchida	October 28, 2017	65	Eiga Kirakira ☆ Purikyua Ara Mōdo: Paritto! Omoide no Mirufīyu!	feature
Digimon Adventure Tri. -Future-	Keitaro Motonaga	May 5, 2018	97	Dejimon Adobenchā Torai. – Bokura no Mirai	feature
Pretty Cure Super Stars!	Yoko Ikeda	March 17, 2018	70	Eiga Purikyua Sūpa Sutāzu!	feature
Hug! Pretty Cure Futari wa Pretty Cure: All Stars Memories	Hiroshi Miyamoto	October 27, 2018	73	Eiga Hagutto! Purikyua ♡ Futari wa Purikyua Ōru Sutāzu Memorīzu	feature
Dragon Ball Super: Broly	Tatsuya Nagamine	December 14, 2018	100	Doragon Bōru Sūpā Burorī	feature
Pretty Cure Miracle Universe	Yukio Kaizawa	March 16, 2019	70	Eiga Purikyua Mirakuru Yunibāsu	feature
Eiga Oshiri Tantei: Curry Naru Jiken	Miho Hirayama	April 24, 2019	29	N/A	featurette
One Piece: Stampede	Takashi Otsuka	August 9, 2019	120	Wan Pīsu Sutanpīdo	feature
Star Twinkle Pretty Cure the Movie: These Feeling within The Song of Stars	Yuta Tanaka	October 19, 2019	72	Eiga Sutā ☆ Tuinkuru Purikyua: Hoshi no Uta ni Omoi o Komete	feature
Digimon Adventure: Last Evolution Kizuna	Tomohisa Taguchi	February 21, 2020	94	Dejimon Adobenchā Rasuto Eboryūshon Kizuna	feature; animation provided by Yumeta Company
Looking for Magical Doremi	Haruka Kamatani; Junichi Sato	November 13, 2020	91	Majo Minarai o Sagashite	feature
Pretty Cure Miracle Leap: A Wonderful Day with Everyone	Toshinori Fukuzawa	October 31, 2020	70	Eiga Purikyua Mirakuru Ripu: Min'na to no Fushigi na Ichinichi	feature
Pretty Guardian Sailor Moon Eternal The Movie	Chiaki Kon	January 8, 2021 (Part 1); February 11, 2021 (Part 2)	160	Gekijōban Bishōjo Senshi Sērā Mūn Etānaru	feature; originally released in two parts; co-animated with Studio Deen; Season 4 of Sailor Moon Crystal (Dead Moon arc)
Healin' Good Pretty Cure the Movie: GoGo! Big Transformation! The Town of Dreams	Ryōta Nakamura	March 20, 2021	70	Eiga Hīrin Guddo Purikyua: Yume no Machi de Kyun! tto GoGo! Daihenshin!!	feature
Tropical-Rouge! Pretty Cure the Movie: Petite Dive! Collaboration Dance Party!	Takashi Otsuka	March 20, 2021	5	Eiga Toropikarūju! Purikyua Puchi Tobikome! Korabo▽Dansu Pāti!	short
The Journey	Kōbun Shizuno	June 25, 2021	110	Jānī – Taiko Arabia Hantō de no Kiseki to Tatakai no Monogatari	feature; co-produced with Manga Productions
Tropical-Rouge! Pretty Cure the Movie: The Snow Princess and the Miraculous Ring!	Junji Shimizu	October 23, 2021	70	Eiga Toropikarūju Purikuya Yuki no Purinsesu to Kiseki no Yubiwa!	feature
Dragon Ball Super: Super Hero	Tetsuro Kodama	June 11, 2022	99	Doragon Bōru Sūpā Sūpā Hīrō	feature
One Piece Film: Red	Gorō Taniguchi	August 6, 2022	115	Wan Pīsu Firumu Reddo	feature; Toei's highest-grossing film.
Delicious Party♡Pretty Cure the Movie: Dreaming♡Children's Lunch!	Akifumi Zako	September 23, 2022	70	Eiga Derishasu Pāti♡Purikyua Yumemiru♡Okosama Rachi!	feature
Delicious Party♡Pretty Cure: My Precious Lunch	Junichi Yamamoto	September 23, 2022	6	Derishasu Pāti♡Purikyua Watashi dake no Oko-sama Lunch	short
The First Slam Dunk	Takehiko Inoue	December 3, 2022	124	THE FIRST SLAM DUNK	feature
Pretty Guardian Sailor Moon Cosmos The Movie	Tomoya Takahashi	June 9, 2023 (Part 1); June 30, 2023 (Part 2)	160	Gekijōban Bishōjo Senshi Sērā Mūn Kosumosu	feature; originally released in two parts; co-animated with Studio Deen; season 5 of Sailor Moon Crystal (Shadow Galactica arc)
Pretty Cure All Stars F	Yuta Tanaka	September 15, 2023	73	Eiga Purikyua Ōru Sutāzu Efu	feature
Digimon Adventure 02: The Beginning	Tomohisa Taguchi	October 27, 2023	80	Dejimon Adobenchā Zero Tsū Za Biginingu	feature; animation provided by Yumeta Company
Birth of Kitarō: The Mystery of GeGeGe	Gō Koga	November 17, 2023	104	Kitarō Tanjō: GeGeGe no Nazo	feature
Eiga Oshiri Tantei Saraba Itoshiki Aibō (Oshiri) yo	Kenji Setō	March 20, 2024		N/A	feature
Wonderful Pretty Cure! The Movie: A Grand Adventure in a Thrilling Game World!	Naoki Miyahara	September 13, 2024	71	Wandafuru Purikyua! Za Mūbī! Dokidoki♡Gēmu no Sekai de Daibōken!	feature
You and Idol Pretty Cure the Movie: For You! Our Kirakilala Concert!	Kōji Ogawa	September 12, 2025	71	Eiga Kimi to Aidoru Purikyua♪ Omatase! Kimi ni Todokeru Kiraki Raibu!	feature
Star Detective Precure! The Movie: The Mysterious Garden and a Secret Pair	Hanako Ueda	September 28, 2026	71	Eiga Meitantei Purikyua! Fushigi na Niwa to Futari no Himitsu	feature
Hypergalactic	David N. Weiss	TBA	TBA	N/A	feature

== Original video animation and original net animation ==
Production	Duration	Year	Alternate title	Notes
Memoru in the Pointed Hat: Marielle's Jewelbox	75	July 21, 1985	Tongari Boushi no Memole: Marielle no Housekibako	OVA
Okubyou na Venus	20	March 21, 1986	Okubyō na vuīnasu	OVA
Transformers: Scramble City	23	April 1986	Tatakae! Chō robotto seimei-tai toransufōmā sukuranburu shiti hatsudō-hen	OVA
Amon Saga		July 19, 1986		
Shonan Bakusozoku	12	September 10, 1986 – March 12, 1999		OVA
Shin Kabukicho Story Hana no Asuka-gumi!		June 10, 1987		
Xanadu Dragonslayer Densetsu		March 1, 1988		
Madonna		March 11, 1988 – June 23, 1989		
Touyama Sakura Uchuu Chou: Yatsu no Na wa Gold		July 25, 1988		
Crying Freeman		November 25, 1988 – February 25, 1994		
Yankee Gale Squad		March 17, 1989 – April 21, 1996		
Be-Bop Highschool		January 26, 1990 – March 21, 1995		
Kimama ni Idol		February 25, 1990		
Hana no Asuka-gumi! Lonely Cats Battle Royale		March 23, 1990		
Kennosuke-sama		July 7, 1990		
Transformers: Zone		July 21, 1990		
Utsunomiko: Heaven Chapter		October 24, 1990 – February 19, 1992		Co-produced with Bandai Visual and Kadokawa Video
Vampire Wars		December 1, 1990		
Sword for Truth		December 28, 1990		Co-produced with Magic Bus.
Psychic Wars		February 22, 1991		
Be-Bop Kaizokuban		March 22, 1991 – June 25, 1993		
3×3 Eyes		October 17, 1991 – September 24, 1992		
Dragon Ball Z: Unite Goku's World		January 28, 1992		
Naniwa Yuukyouden		March 13, 1992		
Taiheiyou ni Kakeru Niji		March 20, 1992		
Shika to Kanta		April 1, 1992		
Zoku Naniwa Yuukyouden		June 25, 1992		
Little Twins		July 23, 1992 – 1993		
Naniwa Yuukyouden: Nekketsu!! Bakushou Mankai-hen		October 25, 1992		
Naniwa Yuukyouden: Chou Gokudou! Yoru no Bat wa Manrui-hen		January 8, 1993		
Kamen Rider SD: Strange!? Kumo Otoko		January 23, 1993		
Naniwa Yuukyouden: Kyouretsu! Ana ga Attara Iretai-hen		May 25, 1993		
Dragon Ball Z Side Story: Plan to Eradicate the Saiyans		July 23, 1993		
Naniwa Yuukyouden: Kanketsu-hen		July 25, 1993		
Emblem Take 2		October 25, 1993 – November 21, 1995		
Yokohama Bakkure-tai		December 17, 1993 – February 21, 1995		
Shin Cutie Honey		April 21, 1994 – November 21, 1995		
Hiroshima e no Tabi		July 20, 1994		
Go! Go! Ackman		July 28, 1994		
Sailor Moon S: Answer The Moon Call		September 26, 1994		
3×3 Eyes: Legend of the Divine Demon		July 25, 1995 – June 25, 1996		
Gakko no Yuurei		October 21, 1995 – December 12, 1997		
Ushiro no Seki no Ochiai-kun		December 8, 1995		
Zokuzoku Mura no Obake-tachi		February 21, 1996 – April 21, 1999		
Senshi Sailor Moon: Sailor Stars – Hero Club		December 13, 1996 – June 21, 1997		
Angel Densetsu		December 13, 1996		
Nezumi-kun no Chokki		July 21, 1997 – January 21, 2000		
Field ni Soyogu Kaze		July 25, 1997		
10-piki no Kaeru		March 13 – March 21, 1998		
Jigoku Sensei Nūbē		June 12, 1998 – May 14, 1999		
Kyoushitsu wa Obake ga Ippai/Boku wa Yuusha da zo		July 10, 1998		
Bishoujo Senshi Sailor Moon Memorial		August 7, 1998 – May 21, 1999		
Bokutachi no Peace River		October 19, 1998		
Time Ranger Cesar Boy no Bouken: Roma Teikoku-hen		February 12, 1999		
Himalaya no Hikari no Oukoku		July 10, 1999		
Getter Robo Memorial		July 21, 1999		
Inuki Kanako Zekkyou Collection: Gakkou ga Kowai!		August 6, 1999		
Sango no Umi to Ouji		February 2000		
Denshin Mamotte Shugogetten		June 23, 2000 – November 30, 2001		
Daisougen to Hakuba		July 2000		
Sabaku no Kuni no Oujosama		March 2001		
Sabaku no Takara no Shiro		February 2002		
Ginga Tetsudou 999		September 9, 2002 – July 2004	Galaxy Express 999 (ONA)	ONA
Saint Seiya – Hades Chapter Sanctuary		November 9, 2002 – July 25, 2003		
Alexandros no Ketsudan		June 2003		
Interlude		March 25 – August 27, 2004		
Kono Shihai kara no Sotsugyou: Ozaki Yutaka		April 21, 2004		
Ojamajo Doremi Na-i-sho		June 26 – December 11, 2004		
Re: Cutie Honey		July 24 – September 25, 2004		Co-production with Gainax.
Iriya no Sora, UFO no Natsu		February 25 – June 29, 2005		
Konjiki no Gash Bell!!: Ougon no Chichi wo Motsu Otoko		May 25, 2005		
Kagayake! Yuujou no V Sign		July 2005		
Saint Seiya – Hades Chapter Inferno		December 17, 2005 – February 6, 2007		
Tsuyu no Hito Shizuku		August 1, 2006		
Zakuro Yashiki		August 1, 2006		
Gendai Kibunroku Kaii Monogatari		August 1, 2006		
Joseito		August 1, 2006		
You Shoumei Bijutsukan Line		August 1, 2006		
Maihime		August 1, 2006		
Fantascope: Tylostoma		August 1, 2006		
Highway Jenny		September 27, 2006		
G-9		September 27, 2006		
Chibi Neko Chobi/Chibi Neko Kobi to Tomodachi		December 8, 2006		
Eko Eko Azarak		January 30, 2007		
Tori no Uta		January 30, 2007		
Sekishoku Elegy		June 29, 2007		
H. P. Lovecraft's The Dunwich Horror and Other Stories		August 28, 2007		
Saint Seiya – Hades Chapter Elysion		March 7 – August 1, 2008		
Mushrambo		September 21, 2008		
One Piece: Romance Dawn Story		November 24, 2008		
Halo Legends		November 7, 2009 – February 16, 2010	Heirō rejenzu	ONA
One Piece Film Strong World: Episode 0		April 16, 2010		
Galaxy Express 999: Journey with Energy Beyond Space and Time	4	July 24 – September 24, 2010	Ginga tetsudō 999: jikū o koeta enerugī no tabi	ONA
Dragon Ball: Plan to Eradicate the Super Saiyans	30	November 11, 2010	Dragon Ball: Super Saiya-jin Zetsumetsu Keikaku	OVA. Remake of Dragon Ball Z: Plan to Destroy the Saiyajin.
Precure kara Minna e no Ouen Movie	1	May 20, 2011	Purikyua kara min'na e no ōen mūbī	ONA
Toei Robot Girls	1	July 2, 2011	Tōei robotto gāruzu	ONA
Precure All Stars DX the Dance Live♥: Miracle Dance Stage e Youkoso	14	November 25, 2011	Purikyua ōru sutāzu DX the DANCE raivu ♥ ~ mirakuru dansu sutēji e yōkoso ~	OVA
Kyōsōgiga	25	December 1, 2011	Kyousou giga	ONA
Kyōsōgiga	10	August 31 – December 22, 2012	Kyousou giga	ONA
Kindaichi Case Files: Black Magic Murder Case	27	December 17, 2012 – March 15, 2013	Kindaichi Shounen no Jikenbo: Kuromajutsu Satsujin Jiken-hen	OVA
One Piece: Glorious Island	5	December 23 – December 30, 2012	Wanpīsu "GLORIOUS ISLAND"	ONA
Robot Girls Z Episode 0	4	July 30, 2013	Robotto gāruzu Z 0	ONA
Pretty Guardian Sailor Moon Crystal	24	July 5, 2014 – July 18, 2015	Bishoujo Senshi Sērā Mūn Kurisutaru	ONA; Seasons 1 and 2 (Dark Kingdom and Black Moon arc)
Saint Seiya: Soul of Gold	24	April 11 – September 26, 2015	Seitōshi seiya – kogane tamashī sōru of gold -	ONA. Animation provided by Bridge.
Robot Girls Z Plus	8	May 20 – October 2, 2015	Robotto gāruzu Z purasu	ONA
One Piece Film: Gold Episode 0 – 711 ver.	10	July 2, 2016	Wanpīsu firumu: gōrudo ~ episode 0 ~ 711 ver.	ONA
KADO: The Right Answer – Ninovo	23	April 6, 2017	Seikaisuru Kado: Ninovo	ONA
Augmented Reality Girls Trinary	7	April 12 – November 29, 2017	Kakuchou Shoujo-kei Trinary	ONA. Animation provided by feel.
Butt Detective: Auto Rickshaw Chase in Port Town	5	August 2, 2017	Oshiri Tantei: Mina to Machi no Tuk-tuk Chase	ONA
KADO: The Right Answer – Beyond Information	120	May 21, 2018	Seikaisuru Kado: Beyond Information	ONA
Super Dragon Ball Heroes	8	July 1, 2018 – August 8, 2024	Sūpā doragon bōru hīrōzu	ONA
Robot Girls Neo	7	August 18 – September 1, 2018	Robotto gāruzu neo	ONA
Saint Seiya: Saintia Shō	25	December 10, 2018 – February 18, 2019	Seitōshi seiya seintia Shō	ONA. Animation provided by Gonzo.
Ojamajo Doremi: Owarai Gekijō	1	March 23, 2019 – March 22, 2020	Ojamajo doremi owarai gekijō	ONA
Knights of the Zodiac: Saint Seiya	23	July 19, 2019 – January 23, 2020	Seitōshi seiya: Knights of the zodiakku	ONA
Digimon Survive: Prologue Movie	3	July 22, 2019	"Dejimon savuaibu" purorōgu mūbī	ONA
Jurassic!	1	August 24, 2019	Jura shikku!	ONA
Digimon Adventure 20th Anniversary Memorial Story Project	6	November 22, 2019 – December 25, 2020	Dejimon'adobenchā 20-shūnen memoriaru sutōrī	ONA
Dream	6	January 24, 2020	Yume	ONA
Urvan	5	February 12, 2021	Āvuan	ONA
Sharedol		October 25, 2021		ONA
Saint Seiya: Knights of the Zodiac – Battle Sanctuary		July 31 – October 9, 2022		ONA
Spicy Candy		December 3, 2022 – present		ONA
Akuma-kun		November 9, 2023		ONA. Co-produced with Encourage Films
Elemon		2023 – present		Co-produced with Sunlight Entertainment
Panda Narikiri Taisou		March 2, 2024 – present		ONA
Ojamajo Carnival!!	1	March 23, 2024	Ojamajo kānibaru!!	ONA
Saint Seiya: Knights of the Zodiac – Battle Sanctuary Part 2	23	April 1, 2024 – June 10, 2024	Seitōshi seiya: Knights of the zodiakku batoru sankuchuari pātsu 2	ONA. Second part of Saint Seiya: Knights of the Zodiac – Battle Sanctuary.
Miraculous: Tales of Ladybug & Cat Noir OVA		2012		

== Video game animation ==
Game	Year
Cobra Command (a.k.a. Thunder Storm)	1984
Ninja Hayate	1984
Freedom Fighter	1984
Road Blaster (a.k.a. Road Avenger and Road Prosecutor)	1985
Time Gal	1985
Sonic the Hedgehog CD	1993
Dragon Ball Z: Ultimate Battle 22	1995
Sailor Moon SuperS: Shin Shuyaku Sōdatsusen	1996
Dragon Ball GT: Final Bout	1997
Chrono Trigger	1999, 2008, 2011
Digimon Rumble Arena	2001
From TV Animation – One Piece: Grand Battle! (One Piece: Grand Battle! in Europe)	2001
From TV Animation – One Piece: Set Sail Pirate Crew!	2001
From TV Animation – One Piece: Grand Battle! 2	2002
From TV Animation – One Piece: Treasure Battle!	2002
From TV Animation – One Piece: Ocean's Dream!	2003
One Piece: Grand Battle! 3	2003
Dragon Ball Z: Budokai 2	2003
Dragon Ball Z: Budokai 3	2004
One Piece: Round the Land	2004
Dragon Ball Z: Sagas	2005
One Piece: Grand Battle! Rush	2005
One Piece: Pirates' Carnival	2005
Dragon Ball Heroes	2010–present
One Piece: Gigant Battle!	2010
One Piece: Gigant Battle! 2	2011
Dragon Ball Z: Ultimate Tenkaichi	2011
One Piece: Romance Dawn	2012
Dragon Ball Heroes: Ultimate Mission	2013
Dragon Ball Z: Battle of Z	2014
One Piece: Super Grand Battle! X	2014
Dragon Ball Heroes: Ultimate Mission 2	2014
Dragon Ball Xenoverse	2015
Dragon Ball Z: Extreme Butōden	2015
Dragon Ball Xenoverse 2	2016
Dragon Ball FighterZ	2018
Dragon Ball Z Kakarot	2020
Digimon Survive	2022

== Video game development ==
Games	Year
Hokuto no Ken	1986
Baltron	1986
Puss In Boots: An Adventure Around the World in 80 Days (Nagagutsu o Haita Neko: Sekai Isshū 80 Nichi Dai Bōken)	1986
Hokuto No Ken 2: Seikimatsu Kyuuseishu Densetsu	1987
SWAT: Special Weapons and Tactics	1987
Kamen no Ninja: Akakage	1988
Fighting Road	1988
Bravoman	1988
Sukeban Deka III	1988
Mr. Gold Tooyama no Kinsan Space Chou	1988
Hokuto no Ken 3: Shinseiki Souzou Seiken Retsuden	1989
Hokuto no Ken: Seizetsu Juuban Shoubu (Fist of the North Star: 10 Big Brawls for the King of Universe)	1989
Shin Satomi Hakkenden: Hikari to Yami no Tatakai	1989
Mottomo Abunai Deka	1990
Volleyfire	1990
Bloody Warriors: Shango no Gyakushuu	1990
Scotland Yard	1990
Hokuto no Ken 4: Shichisei Hakenden: Hokuto Shinken no Kanata e	1991
Final Reverse	1991
Shikinjou (Famicom and Game Boy versions)	1991
Raiden Trad	1991
Hokuto no Ken 5: Tenma Ryuuseiden Ai Zesshou	1992
Hokuto no Ken 6: Gekitou Denshouken – Haou heno Michi	1992
Hokuto no Ken 7: Seiken Retsuden – Denshousha heno Michi	1993
Koede Asobu: Heart Catch PreCure!	2010
Enka no Pandemica	2014
Re:Ver Project -Tokyo- (co-developed with Nestopi)	2025

== Dubbing ==
Animated productions by foreign studios dubbed in Japanese by Toei are The Mystery of the Third Planet (1981 Russian film, dubbed in 2008); Les Maîtres du temps (1982 French-Hungarian film, dubbed in 2014), Alice's Birthday (2009 Russian film, dubbed in 2013) and Becca's Bunch (2018 television series, dubbed in 2021 to 2022).

== Foreign production history ==
Toei has been commissioned to provide animation by Japanese and American studios such as Sunbow Entertainment, Marvel Productions, Hanna-Barbera, DIC Entertainment, Rankin/Bass Productions and World Events Productions (DreamWorks Animation). In the 60's, it primarily worked with Rankin/Bass, but beginning in the 80's, it worked with Marvel Productions and its list of clients grew, until the end of the decade. Toei didn't provide much outsourced animation work in the 90's and since the 2000s has only rarely worked with other companies outside Japan.

Production	Year
The Wacky World of Mother Goose	1967
The Mouse on the Mayflower	1968
The World of Strawberry Shortcake	1980
The Pink Panther in: Pink at First Sight	1981
Spider-Man	1981
Strawberry Shortcake: Pets on Parade	1982
Spider-Man and His Amazing Friends	1982
The Charmkins	1983
G.I. Joe: A Real American Hero	1983–1986
Inspector Gadget (additional services for TMS Entertainment for the ink and painting process)	1983
Dungeons and Dragons	1983–1985
My Little Pony	1984–1985
Gallavants	1984
The Transformers	1984–1987
Robo Force: The Revenge of Nazgar	1984
Turbo Teen	1984
Snorks	1984
Jim Henson's Muppet Babies	1984–1987
Jim Henson's Little Muppet Monsters	1985
Super Sunday	1985–1986
Inhumanoids	1985 spin-off TV series
Jem	1985–1988 spin-off TV series
Voltron Season 3	1985
The Transformers: The Movie	1986
Voltron: Fleet of Doom	1986
Defenders of the Earth	1986–1987
The Adventures of the American Rabbit	1986
My Little Pony: The Movie	1986
My Little Pony 'n Friends	1986–1987
The Glo Friends	1986–1987
The Jetsons	1987
Blondie and Dagwood	1987
G.I. Joe: The Movie	1987
Sky Commanders	1987
The Flintstone Kids	1987
The Smurfs	1987–1988
Foofur	1987
Hello Kitty's Furry Tale Theater	1987
Teenage Mutant Ninja Turtles	1987–1989
The New Archies	1987
Police Academy	1988–1989
Dennis the Menace	1988
The Real Ghostbusters	1988
Superman	1988
X-Men: Pryde of the X-Men	1989
Starship Troopers: Invasion	2012
Miraculous: Tales of Ladybug & Cat Noir	2015–2024
Miraculous Stellar Force	2027

== Controversies ==
=== Fair use disputes ===
Between 2008 and 2018, Toei Animation had copyright claimed TeamFourStar's parody series, DragonBall Z Abridged. TFS stated that the parody series is protected under fair use.

On December 7, 2021, Toei Animation copyright claimed over 150 videos by YouTuber Totally Not Mark, real name Mark Fitzpatrick. He uploaded a video addressing the issue, claiming that they were protected under fair use, and that nine of the videos do not include any Toei footage. He also outlined the appeal process on YouTube, and estimated having the videos reinstated could take over 37 years. He then goes on to announce that he would not be supporting new Toei releases until the issue had been resolved, and also called for a boycott on the upcoming Dragon Ball Super: Super Hero film. The dispute sparked discussion on YouTube on the vulnerability of creators against the copyright system and lack of fair use laws in Japan, with YouTubers such as PewDiePie and The Anime Man speaking out on the issue.

On January 26, 2022, Fitzpatrick had his videos reinstated after negotiations with YouTube.

=== Treatment of employees ===
On January 20, 2021, two employees have accused Toei Animation of overworking its employees and discrimination towards sexual minorities. The company had inappropriately referred to employees who identifies as X-gender (a non-binary identity in Japan).

== See also ==
- SynergySP, Studio Junio and Hal Film Maker/Yumeta Company, animation studios founded by former Toei animators.
- Topcraft, an animation studio founded by former Toei Animation producer Toru Hara.
- Studio Ghibli, an animation studio founded by former Toei animators Hayao Miyazaki and Isao Takahata.
- Mushi Production, an animation studio founded by Osamu Tezuka and former Toei animators.
- Shin-Ei Animation, formally A Production, an animation studio founded by former Toei animator Daikichirō Kusube.
- Yamamura Animation, an animation studio founded by former Toei animator Kōji Yamamura.
- Doga Kobo, an animation studio formed by former Toei animators Hideo Furusawa and Megumu Ishiguro.
