= List of Kinnikuman films =

Kinnikuman, also known as Ultimate Muscle, has had one TV special and seven theatrically released movies.

== Main cast ==
The following is the voice cast of the main characters of the series as they appear in each film. The voice cast for movie only characters are listed with the movies in which they appear.

- Akira Kamiya as Kinnikuman (all movies and TV Special)
- Minori Matsushima as Meat-kun (all movies and TV Special)
- Hideyuki Tanaka as Terryman (all movies and TV Special)
- Eiji Kanie as Ramenman (movies 1-4 and TV Special)
- Banjou Ginga as Ramenman (movies 5-7)
- Daisuke Gouri as Robin Mask (all movies)
- Ryōichi Tanaka as Warsman (TV Special)
- Hideyuki Hori as Warsman (all movies)
- Kaneto Shiozawa as Geronimo (movies 4-7)
- Masaharu Satou as Buffaloman (movies 3-8) and Iwao (all movies and TV Special)
- Tetsuo Mizutori as Brocken Jr. (all movies and TV Special) and Yosaku (movies 1, 3-7, and TV Special)
- Masashi Hirose as Rikishiman (all movies and TV Special)
- Hiroshi Ohtake as Kazuo Nakano (TV Special)
- Sanji Hase as Kazuo Nakano (all movies)
- Chisato Nakajima as Mari Nikaidō (all movies and TV Special)
- Hiromi Tsuru as Natsuko Shōno (all movies and TV Special)
- Keiko Yamamoto as Nachiguron (all movies and TV Special) and Kinkotsu-Obaba (movies 3-7)
- Kazuhiko Kishino as Mayumi Kinniku (all movies and TV Special)
- Nana Yamaguchi as Sayuri Kinniku (all movies and TV Special)
- Yonehiko Kitagawa as Chairman Harabote (all movies and TV Special)
- Kouji Totani as Announcer (movies 2-6) and Gobugari (all movies and TV Special)
- Issei Futamata as Kinkotsuman (all movies and TV Special)

== Showdown! The 7 Justice Supermen vs. The Space Samurais ==
Showdown! The 7 Justice Supermen vs. The Space Samurais
- Directed by: Yasuo Yamayoshi
- Written by: Haruya Yamazaki
- Produced by: Takeshi Tamiya
- Starring: Akira Kamiya; Minori Matsushima; Hideyuki Tanaka; Eiji Kanie; Daisuke Gōri; Ichirō Nagai
- Music by: Shinsuke Kazato
- Production company: Toei Animation
- Distributed by: Toei Company
- Release date: April 7, 1984
- Running time: 73 minutes
- Country: Japan
- Language: Japanese

Showdown! The 7 Justice Supermen vs. The Space Samurais (決戦!7人の正義超人vs宇宙野武士, Kessen! Shichinin no Seigi Choujin vs Uchuu Nobushi)

A TV Special first aired on April 7, 1984. It covers the Planet Rakka story arc. A young boy from Planet Rakka named Beansman asks Kinnikuman and the others to help save his planet from the Space Samurai's led by Black King. The story was a parody of The Seven Samurai.

=== Cast ===
- Satomi Majima as Beansman
- Jouji Yanami as Ingen
- Chisato Nakajima as Princess Marron
- Masashi Hirose as Robo Choujin
- Issei Futamata as Yondai Susuna

==== The Space Samurais ====
- Ichiro Nagai as Black King
- Yonehiko Kitagawa as Black Sumoman
- Kazuhiko Kishino as Black Killer
- Hideyuki Tanaka as Black Fighter
- Kouji Totani as Black Knight
- Issei Futamata as Black Kung Fu
- Masaharu Satou as Black Tomahawk

== Kinnikuman: Stolen Championship Belt ==
Kinnikuman: Stolen Championship Belt (キン肉マン 奪われたチャンピオンベルト, Kinnikuman Ubawareta Chanpion Beruto)

- Release Date: July 14, 1984
- Released With: The Kabocha Wine, Chodenshi Bioman, Uchuu Keiji Shaider
- Rivals: Octopus Dragon, Mouko-seijin, Harigorasu, Ukon, AmeRug Boss, Gammalar
- Yudetamago Cameo: Octopus Dragon's Minions

== Great Riot! Justice Superman ==
Great Riot! Justice Superman (大暴れ!正義超人, Ō Abare! Seigi Choujin)

- Release Date: December 22, 1984
- Released With: Dr. Slump and Arale-chan: Hoyoyo! The Treasure of Nanaba Castle and Uchuu Keiji Shaider: Follow the Shigishigi Kidnapping Gang!
- Rivals: Black Emperor, Shishkeba Boo, Great Ukon, Black Buffalo, Black Knight, Black Rain, Black Menrui, Black Bear, Black Sumo, Black Satan
- Yudetamago Cameo: Black Emperor's Minions

== Justice Supermen vs. Ancient Supermen ==
Kinnikuman: Justice Choujin vs. Ancient Choujin
- キン肉マン 正義超人vs古代超人
- Directed by: Yasuo Yamayoshi
- Written by: Haruya Yamazaki
- Produced by: Takeshi Tamiya
- Starring: Akira Kamiya; Minori Matsushima; Hideyuki Tanaka; Eiji Kanie; Daisuke Gōri; Hideyuki Hori; Ichirō Nagai
- Music by: Shinsuke Kazato
- Production company: Toei Animation
- Distributed by: Toei Company
- Release date: March 16, 1985
- Running time: 45 minutes
- Country: Japan
- Language: Japanese

Kinnikuman: Justice Choujin vs. Ancient Choujin (キン肉マン 正義超人vs古代超人, Kinnikuman: Seigi Choujin tai Kodai Choujin) is the third theatrical film based on the anime series Kinnikuman. It was released in Japan on March 16, 1985, alongside Gu-Gu Ganmo, Dengeki Sentai Changeman, and Tongari Boushi no Memoru. It is set after the Golden Mask Arc.

This film is the first to feature anime original character Kinkotsu-Obaba. Although this film is set after the Golden Mask Arc, the character Geronimo does not appear as an active fighter until the next film. He does, however, appear in flashbacks to the Golden Mask conclusion. This is also the second time voice actor Ichirō Nagai appears in a Kinnikuman work playing the main villain. He had previously appeared in the TV Special. It also features the return of voice actors Kōzō Shioya and Yasuo Tanaka, who had previously appeared in the first film Stolen Championship Belt.

== Plot ==
While Kinnikuman is on vacation with Mari-san's kindergarten class at Easter Island, the young Kouichi-kun, who uses a wheelchair, laments being with Kinnikuman, preferring to instead be with his favorite Justice Choujin Buffaloman. Meanwhile, the other Justice Choujins are also vacationing at ancient landmarks

== Cast ==
Character Name	Voice actor
Kinnikuman	Akira Kamiya
Meat-kun	Minori Matsushima
Nakano-san	Sanji Hase
Natsuko; Yeti	Hiromi Tsuru
Kouichi	Chiyoko Kawashima
Terryman	Hideyuki Tanaka
Warsman	Hideyuki Hori
Nachiguron; Kinkotsu-Obaba	Keiko Yamamoto
Mari-san	Chisato Nakajima
Kinniku Daiou	Kazuhiko Kishino
Queen Kinniku	Nana Yamaguchi
Ramenman	Eiji Kanie
Brocken Jr. Yosaku-san	Tetsuo Mizutori
Tournament Chairman; Saurus Satan	Yonehiko Kitagawa
Rikishiman; Condor Satan	Masashi Hirose
Robin Mask	Daisuke Gōri
Kinkotsuman; Cobra Satan	Issei Futamata
Detective Gobugari; Jaws Satan	Kōji Totani
Buffaloman; Iwao	Masaharu Satō
Haniwa Satan	Kōzō Shioya
Stone Satan	Yasuo Tanaka
Eye Satan	Kōji Yada
Satan King	Ichirō Nagai
Special Appearance	Yudetamago

- In the previous film, Daisuke Gōri played the opponent of Masashi Hirose's character. This time Hirose is playing the opponent of Gōri's character.
- This is the second Kinnikuman film where Issei Futamata plays Ramenman's opponent. He had previously done this in Great Riot! Justice Choujin. He also played Ramenman's opponent in the 1984 TV Special.

== Counterattack! The Underground Space Choujin ==
Counterattack! The Underground Space Choujin 逆襲!宇宙かくれ超人
- Directed by: Yasuo Yamayoshi
- Written by: Haruya Yamazaki
- Produced by: Takeshi Tamiya
- Starring: Akira Kamiya; Minori Matsushima; Hideyuki Tanaka; Eiji Kanie; Daisuke Gōri; Hideyuki Hori; Kaneto Shiozawa; Takeshi Aono
- Music by: Shinsuke Kazato
- Production company: Toei Animation
- Distributed by: Toei Company
- Release date: July 13, 1985
- Running time: 39 minutes
- Country: Japan
- Language: Japanese
- Box office: ¥1.07 billion ($13.41 million)

Counterattack! The Underground Space Choujin (逆襲!宇宙かくれ超人,, Gyakushuu! Uchuu Kakure Choujin) is the fourth theatrical film based on the anime series Kinnikuman. It was released in Japan on July 13, 1985, alongside Dr. Slump and Arale-chan: Hoyoyo! Dream Capital Mecha Police, Captain Tsubasa: Great Europe Play-Off, and Dengeki Sentai Changeman: Shuttle Base Showdown. It is set after the Dream Choujin Tag Arc. It is the first film to feature the character Geronimo and the last film where Eiji Kanie supplies the voice of Ramenman. It is also the shortest film of the series. It is based on the Kinnikuman special chapter Robin Memo (ロビン･メモ).

- Released With: Dr. Slump and Arale-chan: Hoyoyo! Dream Capital Mecha Police, Captain Tsubasa: Great Europe Play-Off, and Dengeki Sentai Changeman: Shuttle Base Showdown
- Rivals: Hydra King, Hydra Būton, Hydra Gun, Hydra Sumo, Hydra Indy, New Sunshine, New Ashuraman, New Black Hole, New Black Rain
- Yudetamago Cameo: Ukon Jr.
- Opening Theme: Blazing Kinnikuman (炎のキン肉マン,, Honoo no Kinnikuman) by Akira Kushida
- Closing Theme: Kinnikuman Ondo (キン肉マン音頭) by Akira Kamiya (Kinnikuman) and Minori Matsushima (Meat-kun)

=== New characters ===
- Hydra King (ハイドラキング)
- New Sunshine (ニューサンシャイン)
- New Black Hole (ニューブラックホール)
- New Black Rain (ニューブラックレイン)
- New Ashuraman (ニューアシュラマン)
- Hydra Būton (ハイドラブートン)
- Hydra Gun (ハイドラガン)
- Hydra Sumo (ハイドラズモウ)
- Hydra Indy (ハイドラインディー)
- Ukon Jr. (ウコンJr)

=== Cast ===
Character name	Voice actor
Kinnikuman	Akira Kamiya
Meat-kun; Queen Elizabeth II	Minori Matsushima
Kazuo Nakano	Sanji Hase
Natsuko	Hiromi Tsuru
Mari-san	Chisato Nakajima
Terryman	Hideyuki Tanaka
Geronimo	Kaneto Shiozawa
Warsman	Hideyuki Hori
Nachiguron	Keiko Yamamoto
King Kinniku; New Black Hole	Kazuhiko Kishino
Queen Kinniku	Nana Yamaguchi
Ramenman	Eiji Kanie
Brocken Jr. Yosaku-san	Tetsuo Mizutori
Tournament Chairman; Hydra Sumo	Yonehiko Kitagawa
Robin Mask; New Ashuraman	Daisuke Gōri
Rikishiman	Masashi Hirose
Buffaloman; Iwao; New Sunshine	Masaharu Satō
Kinkotsuman; Hydra Gun	Issei Futamata
Detective Gobugari; New Black Rain	Kōji Totani
Hydra Būton	Kōji Yada
Hydra King	Takeshi Aono
Special Appearance	Yudetamago

== Hour of Triumph! Justice Superman ==
Hour of Triumph! Seigi Choujin 晴れ姿!正義超人
- Directed by: Takenori Kawada
- Written by: Haruya Yamazaki
- Produced by: Takeshi Tamiya
- Starring: Akira Kamiya; Minori Matsushima; Hideyuki Tanaka; Daisuke Gōri; Hideyuki Hori; Kaneto Shiozawa; Shōzō Iizuka
- Music by: Shinsuke Kazato
- Production company: Toei Animation
- Distributed by: Toei Company
- Release date: December 21, 1985
- Running time: 60 minutes
- Country: Japan
- Language: Japanese
- Box office: ¥1.07 billion ($13.41 million)

Hour of Triumph! Seigi Choujin (晴れ姿!正義超人,, Haresugata! Seigi Choujin) is the fifth theatrical film based on the anime series Kinnikuman. It was released in Japan on December 21, 1985, alongside Captain Tsubasa: Watch Out, All Japan Jr.! and GeGeGe no Kitaro. It is set during the Dream Choujin Tag Arc.

It is the first film to feature Banjō Ginga as the voice of Ramenman (due to Eiji Kanie's death in October 1985) and the last to feature Kōji Yada. It is also the second film to feature the character Kinkotsu-Obaba, who had been omitted from the previous film.

- Released With: Captain Tsubasa: Watch Out, All Japan Jr.! and GeGeGe no Kitarō
- Rivals: Shuten Doji, The Nio, The Umibōzun, The Ninjaman, The Sanzokūn
- Yudetamago Cameo: Ukonnosuke
- Opening Theme: Blazing Kinnikuman (炎のキン肉マン,, Honoo no Kinnikuman) by Akira Kushida
- Closing Theme: Kinniku Mambo (キン肉マンボ) by Akira Kamiya (Kinnikuman)

=== New characters ===
- Mari-hime (マリ姫,, Princess Mari)
- Shuten Doji (朱天童子)
- The Nioh (ザ・ニオーツ)
- The Ninjaman (ザ・ニンジャマン)
- The Sanzokūn (ザ・サンゾクーン)
- The Umibōzun (ザ・ウミボーズン)
- Ukonnosuke (ウコンの介)

=== Cast ===
Character Name	Voice actor
Kinnikuman	Akira Kamiya
Meat-kun	Minori Matsushima
Kazuo Nakano; Crows	Sanji Hase
Kinniku Daiou; The Umibouzun	Kazuhiko Kishino
Queen Kinniku	Nana Yamaguchi
Tournament Chairman	Yonehiko Kitagawa
Nachiguron; Kinkotsu-Obaba	Keiko Yamamoto
Natsuko Shōno	Hiromi Tsuru
Terryman	Hideyuki Tanaka
Ramenman	Banjō Ginga
Geronimo	Kaneto Shiozawa
Warsman	Hideyuki Hori
Robin Mask	Daisuke Gōri
Rikishiman; The Ninjaman	Masashi Hirose
Kinkotsuman; The Sanzokūn	Issei Futamata
Buffaloman; Iwao	Masaharu Satō
Brocken Jr. Yosaku-san	Tetsuo Mizutori
Detective Gobugari	Kōji Totani
Mari Nikaidō; Mari-hime	Chisato Nakajima
The Nio	Kōji Yada
Shuten Doji	Shōzō Iizuka
Special Appearance	Yudetamago

== Crisis in New York! ==
Crisis in New York! ニューヨーク危機一髪!
- Directed by: Takenori Kawada
- Written by: Kenji Terada
- Produced by: Takeshi Tamiya
- Starring: Akira Kamiya; Minori Matsushima; Hideyuki Tanaka; Daisuke Gōri; Hideyuki Hori; Kaneto Shiozawa; Hidekatsu Shibata
- Music by: Shinsuke Kazato
- Production company: Toei Animation
- Distributed by: Toei Company
- Release date: March 15, 1986
- Running time: 45 minutes
- Country: Japan
- Language: Japanese

Crisis in New York! (ニューヨーク危機一髪!, Nyū Yōku Kiki Ippatsu) is the sixth theatrical film based on the anime series Kinnikuman. It was released in Japan on March 15, 1986, alongside Captain Tsubasa: Race Towards Tomorrow, GeGeGe no Kitarō: The Great Yōkai War, and Choushinsei Flashman. It is set after the Dream Choujin Tag Arc.

This was the last film to feature a cameo from series creators Yudetamago. It was also the second and last film to feature the Announcer. The villain in the film is Akuma Shogun, who appeared in the original manga and anime series as the leader of the Devil Knights during the Golden Mask Arc. Hidekatsu Shibata returns as the main antagonist of this film, having previously played that role in Great Riot! Seigi Choujin.

- Released With: Captain Tsubasa: Race Towards Tomorrow, GeGeGe no Kitarō: The Great Yōkai War, and Choushinsei Flashman
- Rivals: Akuma Shogun
- Yudetamago Cameo: Inspector Ukon
- Opening Theme: Blazing Kinnikuman (炎のキン肉マン,, Honoo no Kinnikuman) by Akira Kushida
- Closing Theme: Kinniku Mambo (キン肉マンボ) by Akira Kamiya (Kinnikuman)

=== New characters ===
- Big Apple (ビッグアップル)
- Yay Totani (イエーイ・トタニー)
- Sandy Nakano (サンディ・ナカーノ)
- Inspector Ukon (ウコン警部,, Ukon-keibu)
- Subway Boss (地下鉄のボス,, Chikatetsu no Bosu)

=== Cast ===
Character name	Voice actor
Kinnikuman	Akira Kamiya
Meat-kun	Minori Matsushima
Queen Kinniku	Nana Yamaguchi
Tournament Chairman; Ronald Reagan	Yonehiko Kitagawa
Kazuo Nakano; Sandy Nakano	Sanji Hase
Nachiguron; Kinkotsu-Obaba	Keiko Yamamoto
Natsuko Shōno	Hiromi Tsuru
Mari Nikaidō	Chisato Nakajima
Mayumi Kinniku	Kazuhiko Kishino
Terryman	Hideyuki Tanaka
Ramenman	Banjō Ginga
Warsman	Hideyuki Hori
Geronimo	Kaneto Shiozawa
Detective Gobugari; Yay Totani; Announcer	Kōji Totani
Robin Mask; Narration	Daisuke Gōri
Buffaloman; Iwao	Masaharu Satō
Kinkotsuman	Issei Futamata
Rikishiman; Subway Boss	Masashi Hirose
Brocken Jr. Yosaku-san	Tetsuo Mizutori
Akuma Shogun	Hidekatsu Shibata
Big Apple	Hitoshi Takagi
Special Appearance	Yudetamago

== Justice Supermen vs. Fighter Supermen ==
Seigi Choujin vs. Senshi Choujin 正義超人vs戦士超人
- Directed by: Yasuo Yamayoshi
- Written by: Haruya Yamazaki
- Produced by: Takeshi Tamiya
- Starring: Akira Kamiya; Minori Matsushima; Hideyuki Tanaka; Daisuke Gōri; Hideyuki Hori; Kaneto Shiozawa; Chikao Ōtsuka
- Music by: Shinsuke Kazato
- Production company: Toei Animation
- Distributed by: Toei Company
- Release date: December 20, 1986
- Running time: 51 minutes
- Country: Japan
- Language: Japanese

Seigi Choujin vs. Senshi Choujin (正義超人vs戦士超人) is the seventh and final theatrical film based on the anime series Kinnikuman. It was released in Japan on December 20, 1986, alongside GeGeGe no Kitarō: Crash!! The Great Rebellion of the Multi-Dimensional Yōkai and Dragon Ball: The Legend of Shen Long.

The character Neptuneman appeared in the original manga and anime as the main antagonist of the Dream Choujin Tag Arc. Chikao Ōtsuka returns as one of the main antagonists of this film, having previously played that role in Stolen Championship Belt.

- Release Date: December 20, 1986
- Released With: GeGeGe no Kitarō: Crash!! The Great Rebellion of the Multi-Dimensional Yōkai and Dragon Ball: The Legend of Shen Long
- Rivals: Iron Mask, Big Shinjō, Myō'ō, Senju Kan, Tōhōten, Nioman, Magorakasu, The Kongō, Great Ukon the 2nd, Paper
- Opening Theme: Kinnikuman Sensation (キン肉マン旋風(センセーション)) by Akira Kushida
- Closing Theme: Kinnikuman Club (キン肉マン倶楽部) by Akira Kamiya (Kinnikuman)

=== New characters ===
- Dr. Georg/Iron Mask (鉄仮面,, Tekkamen)
- Great Ukon the 2nd (グレートウコン2世,, Gurēto Ukon Nisei)
- Paper (ペーパー)
- Big Shinjou (ビッグ・シンジョウ)
- Myō'ō (ミョウオウ)
- Senju Kan (センジュカーン)
- Tōhōten (トーホーテーン)
- Nioman (ニオーマン)
- Mahoragas (マゴラカス)
- The Kongō (ザ・コンゴー)

=== Cast ===
Character Name	Voice actor
Kinnikuman	Akira Kamiya
Meat-kun	Minori Matsushima
Kazuo Nakano	Sanji Hase
Nachiguron; Kinkotsu-Obaba	Keiko Yamamoto
Kinniku Daiou; Neptuneman	Kazuhiko Kishino
Queen Kinniku	Nana Yamaguchi
Tournament Chairman; Nioman	Yonehiko Kitagawa
Terryman; Paper	Hideyuki Tanaka
Warsman	Hideyuki Hori
Geronimo	Kaneto Shiozawa
Robin Mask; Big Shinjō	Daisuke Gōri
Ramenman; Magorakasu	Banjō Ginga
Buffaloman; Iwao; Great Ukon the 2nd	Masaharu Satō
Rikishiman	Masashi Hirose
Kinkotsuman; Tōhōten	Issei Futamata
Brocken Jr. Yosaku-san	Tetsuo Mizutori
Detective Gobugari; The Kongō	Kōji Totani
Natsuko; Princess Diana	Hiromi Tsuru
Mari-san	Chisato Nakajima
Myō'ō; Dr. Georg's Subordinate	Kazumi Tanaka
Senju Kan	Masato Hirano
Dr. Georg	Chikao Ōtsuka

== Kinnikuman II Sei ==
Two theatrically released movies were made for the sequel series Kinnikuman II Sei. The first was made before the anime television series began. The villains from both films return during the Choujin Olympics in the anime television series as the second movie is non-canon because Cyborg gang does not remember him.

=== Cast ===
- Masaya Onosaka as Mantaro Kinniku (both movies)
- Konami Yoshida as Alexandria Meat (both movies)
- Ryoutarou Okiayu as Kevin Mask (second movie)
- Toshiyuki Morikawa as Terry the Kid (both movies)
- Yasunori Masutani as Gazelleman (both movies)
- Ginzō Matsuo as Seiuchin (first movie)
- Takumi Yamazaki as Seiuchin (second movie)
- Fumiko Orikasa as Rinko Nikaidou (second movie)
- Ai Nonaka as Keiko (second movie)
- Reiko Kiuchi as Tamaki (second movie)
- Mahito Ōba as Announcer Yoshigai (both movies)
- Naoki Tatsuta as Kazuo Nakano (both movies)

=== Kinnikuman: Second Generations ===
Kinnikuman: Second Generations
- Directed by: Toshiaki Komura
- Starring: Masaya Onosaka; Konami Yoshida; Toshiyuki Morikawa; Akio Ōtsuka
- Production company: Toei Animation
- Distributed by: Toei Company, Ltd.
- Release date: July 14, 2001
- Running time: 25 minutes
- Country: Japan
- Language: Japanese

(キン肉マンII世, Kinnikuman II Sei)

Released in 2001 alongside Motto! Ojamajo Doremi ~Secret of the Frog Stone~ and Digimon Tamers. The fans Shimada-san and Nakai-san are based on Kinnikuman creators Takashi Shimada and Yoshinori Nakai (Yudetamago). The ending theme, "Muscle Beat", was performed by famous martial artist Nobuaki Kakuda, who also provided the opening narration.

=== Plot ===
While the New Generation Choujins are taking part in Fan Appreciation Day, The Cyborg arrives, takes Meat hostage, and challenges Mantarou to a fight inside Tokyo Tower.

=== Cast ===
- Akio Ōtsuka as The Cyborg
- Junko Noda as Kensuke
- Keiichirō Yamamoto as Shimada-san
- Hirofumi Tanaka as Nakai-san
- Yasuhiko Kawazu as Ring Announcer
- Nobuaki Kakuda as Narrator
- Akira Kamiya as Kinnikuman I (Suguru)

=== Muscle Ginseng Competition! The Great Choujin War ===
Muscle Ginseng Competition! The Great Choujin War
- Directed by: Toshiaki Komura
- Starring: Masaya Onosaka; Konami Yoshida; Ryōtarō Okiayu; Toshiyuki Morikawa; Fumiko Orikasa; Hozumi Gouda
- Production company: Toei Animation
- Distributed by: Toei Company, Ltd.
- Release date: July 20, 2002
- Running time: 40 minutes
- Country: Japan
- Language: Japanese

(マッスル人参争奪！超人大戦争, Massuru Ninjin Soudatsu! Choujin Dai Sensou)

=== Plot ===
In order to save a princess, Mantarou and the gang must find a special ginseng. They are later joined by Kevin Mask.

=== Cast ===
- Megumi Urawa as Arenanda
- Akiko Nakagawa as Princess Darenanda
- Yudetamago (as Takashi Shimada) as Cannon Choujin
- Hozumi Gouda as Baron Maximillion
- Bin Shimada as Dazzle
- Shinichirou Ohta as The Protector
- Yasuhiro Takato as El Kaerun
