= Great Riot! Seigi Choujin =

Kinnikuman: Great Riot! Seigi Choujin
- キン肉マン 大暴れ!正義超人
- Directed by: Takeshi Shirato
- Written by: Haruya Yamazaki
- Based on: Kinnikuman by Yudetamago
- Produced by: Takeshi Tamiya
- Starring: Akira Kamiya; Minori Matsushima; Hideyuki Tanaka; Eiji Kanie; Daisuke Gōri; Hideyuki Hori; Hidekatsu Shibata
- Music by: Shinsuke Kazato
- Production company: Toei Animation
- Distributed by: Toei Company
- Release date: December 22, 1984
- Running time: 48 minutes
- Language: Japanese

Kinnikuman: Great Riot! Seigi Choujin (キン肉マン 大暴れ!正義超人, Kinnikuman: Ō Abare! Seigi Choujin) is a 1984 Japanese animated film. It is the second theatrical film based on the anime series Kinnikuman. It was released in Japan on December 22, 1984, alongside Dr. Slump and Arale-chan: Hoyoyo! The Treasure of Nanaba Castle and Uchuu Keiji Shaider: Follow the Shigishigi Kidnapping Gang!. It is set after the Seven Akuma Choujin Arc.

It was the first movie to feature the character Buffaloman and was the first of only two films to feature the Announcer (the other being Crisis in New York!). It is the first anime appearance of Bibinba, who appears as Kinnikuman's fiancee in the original manga.

== New characters ==
Black Emperor (ブラックエンペラー)
Great Ukon (大ウコン,, Dai Ukon)
Black Buffalo (ブラックバッファロー)
Black Knight (ブラックナイト)
Black Rain (ブラックレイン)
Black Noodle (ブラックメンルイ,, Burakku Menrui)
Black Bear (ブラックベア)
Black Sumo (ブラックズモー)
Black Satan (ブラックサタン)

== Plot ==
The mighty Horumon clan have been rivals of the Kinniku Clan for years, but today they are nearly extinct. When the last daughter of the Horumon Clan falls in love with Kinnikuman during her mission to assassinate him, her father Horumon Yaki enlists the aide of Shishkeba Boo of the Barbecue Clan, promising him Bibinba's hand in marriage. Shishkeba Boo himself has joined forces with the "Dark Monarch" Black Emperor, who looks to destroy Kinnikuman. Two of his spies (series creators Yudetamago in a cameo) have learned of Kinnikuman's location, so they head for Earth.

While Kinnikuman whines about not being interviewed on the Choujin Hour with the rest of the Idol Choujins, Chairman Harabote arrives with a letter of challenge from Shishkeba Boo. Kinnikuman heads to Mount Fuji and the fight begins. Meanwhile, Black Emperor sends out his Black Corps (ブラック軍団,, Burakku Gundan) to attack the Idol Choujins.

As Kinnikuman's fight continues, Great Ukon arrives with his minions to help Shishkeba Boo. However, Shishkeba Boo is outraged by this cowardly tactic and fights off the minions while Kinnikuman defeats Great Ukon with a Kinniku Buster. Black Emperor then arrives and challenges Kinnikuman. When Kinnikuman refuses, he places Bibinba and her father on a large boulder and surrounds them with a lake of fire. Kinnikuman tries to walk through the flames, but only gets halfway through before almost passing out. Suddenly, Terryman and Warsman arrive and pull him out while Robin Mask and Rikishiman save Bibinba and her father. With the Idol Choujins all there, the real fights begin.

Kinnikuman is supposed to fight the Black Satan corps but is easily dominated by them. Black Emperor believes he has won and begins to leave. Suddenly, Buffaloman arrives and volunteers to take on the Black Satans while Kinnikuman fights Black Emperor.

At first, Kinnikuman has trouble even catching Black Emperor, but as soon as he does Black Emperor begins using his Devil Fire technique. Meanwhile, the Idol Choujins all win their fights with their trademark techniques. Kinnikuman eventually defeats Black Emperor with his own version of the Devil Fire followed by his new finishing move, the Kinniku Driver.

Bibinba goes to embrace Kinnikuman, but he suggests that she go to Shishkeba Boo, who, although misguided, gave his best to fight for her honor. He then says that he already has Mari-san, at which point she suddenly pops up out of nowhere and the two are reunited.

== Songs ==
Opening Theme

- Blazing Kinnikuman (炎のキン肉マン,, Honoo no Kinnikuman) by Akira Kushida

Closing Theme

- Kinniku Mambo (キン肉マンボ) by Akira Kamiya (Kinnikuman)

== Cast ==
Character name	Japanese voice actor
Kinnikuman	Akira Kamiya
Meat-kun	Minori Matsushima
Nakano-san	Sanji Hase
Kinniku Daiou; Black Knight	Kazuhiko Kishino
Queen Kinniku	Nana Yamaguchi
Nachiguron	Keiko Yamamoto
Natsuko	Hiromi Tsuru
Mari-san	Chisato Nakajima
Bibinba	Yuriko Yamamoto
Shishkeba Boo	Keiichi Noda
Black Emperor	Hidekatsu Shibata
Horumon Yaki	Jōji Yanami
Terryman	Hideyuki Tanaka
Ramenman	Eiji Kanie
Detective Gobugari; Announcer; Black Rain	Kōji Totani
Robin Mask; Black Sumo	Daisuke Gōri
Warsman; Black Satan	Hideyuki Hori
Kinkotsuman; Black Menrui	Issei Futamata
Buffaloman; Iwao; Black Bear	Masaharu Satō
Rikishiman	Masashi Hirose*
Yosaku-san; Brocken Jr.	Tetsuo Mizutori
Tournament Chairman; Black Buffalo	Yonehiko Kitagawa
Great Ukon	Kōji Yada
Special Appearance	Yudetamago

- For unknown reasons, Masashi Hirose is uncredited for his appearance in this film.
