= Kinnikuman (film) =

- キン肉マン
- Directed by: Takeshi Shirato
- Written by: Haruya Yamazaki
- Based on: Kinnikuman by Yudetamago
- Produced by: Takeshi Tamiya
- Starring: Akira Kamiya; Minori Matsushima; Hideyuki Tanaka; Eiji Kanie; Daisuke Gōri; Hideyuki Hori; Chikao Ohtsuka
- Music by: Shinsuke Kazato
- Production company: Toei Animation
- Distributed by: Toei Company
- Release date: July 14, 1984
- Running time: 48 minutes
- Country: Japan
- Language: Japanese

Kinnikuman (キン肉マン), also known as Kinnikuman: Stolen Championship Belt (キン肉マン 奪われたチャンピオンベルト, Kinnikuman Ubawareta Chanpion Beruto), is the first theatrical film of the anime series Kinnikuman. It was released in Japan on July 14, 1984, along with Choudenshi Bioman, Uchuu Keiji Shaider, and The Kabocha Wine. It is set after the 21st Choujin Olympics.

This was the first movie to feature Kōji Yada, who appears in all following movies (except the final two), and also the first to feature series creators Yudetamago in a cameo. Octopus Dragon, Harigorasu, and Ukon are all kaijū from the infamous "Roots Island" two-part story from the original manga that does not appear in recent reprints. Mouko-seijin is also a kaijū from the original manga, although these characters bear little resemblance to their manga counterparts. The movie's monster Gigasaurus does resemble the manga's Octopus Dragon.

Descendants of Ukon would appear in all following films (usually played by Yudetamago).

== New characters ==
Octopus Dragon III (オクトパスドラゴンIII世,, Okutopasu Doragon Sansei)
Gigasaurus (ギガサウルス)
Harigorasu (ハリゴラス)
Ukon (ウコン)
American Rugby Boss (アメラグボス,, Ameragu Bosu)
Gammalar (ガンマラー)
Mouko-seijin (猛虎星人,, Fierce Tiger Alien)

== Plot ==
After winning the 21st Choujin Olympics, Kinnikuman plans to build his own theme park. As his friends and celebrities arrive, the sky grows dark and with a flash of lightning Kinnikuman's championship belt is gone. He then sees that it has been taken by Octopus Dragon III, who challenges him to take it back. Kinnikuman tries but fails and Mari is kidnapped. Octopus Dragon gives Kinnikuman a time limit to save her before she is fed to the monster Gigasaurus and then returns to his home world of Planet Metro (メトロ星,, Metoro-sei). Despite his injuries, Kinnikuman is determined to go and reclaim his belt and Mari. Luckily, Terryman, Ramenman, Robin Mask, Warsman, Brocken Jr., and Rikishiman arrive to lend him a hand.

Upon arrival on Planet Metro, they are spotted by two minions of Octopus Dragon (series creators Yudetamago in a cameo). They report back to Octopus Dragon, who sends his Kyou'aku Choujin (凶悪超人,, Villainous Supermen) off to stop the Idol Choujins from advancing. They first come across Harigorasu, who is guarding a log bridge. Rikishiman volunteers to fight him and eventually causes them both to fall over into the valley below. Although Rikishiman manages to grab hold of the wall of the valley, he tells Kinnikuman and the others to go on without him as it would take too much time to save him. When Kinnikuman refuses, he lets go of the wall and falls into the valley.

They next meet the ninjutsu Choujin Ukon and his minions. After a comical scene where Kinnikuman mishears Ukon's name as unko (うんこ,, poop), Ramenman and Brocken Jr. volunteer to take them on while the others continue on the journey. As they continue, Robin Mask and Warsman volunteer to take on AmeRug Boss and his minions so Kinnikuman and Terryman can continue. However, Warsman meets up with them again and tells of how Robin threw himself and several of the enemies into an erupting volcano. Warsman then ends up taking on another group of enemies by himself, urging Kinnikuman and Terryman to continue.

Kinnikuman and Terryman finally find Mari but are immediately challenged by Octopus Dragon to a tag match against himself and Mouko-seijin. Broadcast all over the universe, the fight takes place in a ring with electric ropes. The ropes are powered by a machine that Octopus Dragon's minion Gammalar turns off whenever his boss needs to use the ropes. After a fierce struggle, Terryman defeats Mouko-seijin with his trademark Calf Branding but is shot by Gammalar before he can help Kinnikuman. Kinnikuman remembers the sacrifices his friends have made for him and evokes the Kajiba no Kuso Djikara. He then defeats Octopus Dragon with the Fuu Rin Ka Zan followed by the Kinniku Buster.

Gammalar then tries to shoot Mari down into Gigasaurus' mouth, but Kinnikuman knock him away and catches Mari. With his last breath, Octopus Dragon releases Gigasaurus from his prison and the monster immediately goes after Kinnikuman and Mari. Kinnikuman is almost eaten by Gigasaurus but is saved by Ramenman and Rikishiman. He then manages to lure the beast into falling over the side of a cliff. Kinnikuman, Mari, the Idol Choujins, Meat, and Nachiguron then rest by watching the sunset. Kinnikuman begins to cry at the beautiful display of friendship he witnessed today, so Mari offers him her handkerchief. They almost kiss but are interrupted by a female dinosaur emerging from the ground beneath them and confessing her own feelings for Kinnikuman, ending the film on a comical note with all the characters laughing.

== Songs ==
Opening Theme

- "Kinnikuman Go Fight! (キン肉マンGo Fight!)" by Akira Kushida

Closing Theme

- "Miraculous Comeback Fighter (奇蹟の逆転ファイター,, Kiseki no Gyakuten Faitā)" by Akira Kamiya (Kinnikuman)

Insert Songs

- "Rainbow Knight (虹色の騎士,, Niji'iro no Kishi)" by Tsutomu Arukawa
- "Bear Claws of Sorrow (悲しみのベアー・クロー,, Kanashimi no Beā Kurō)" by Woo
- "See You Again, Hero" by Akira Kamiya (Kinnikuman)

== Cast ==
Character name	Voice actor
Kinnikuman	Akira Kamiya
Meat-kun	Minori Matsushima
Nakano-san	Sanji Hase
Terryman	Hideyuki Tanaka
Ramenman	Eiji Kanie
Natsuko; Seiko Matsuda	Hiromi Tsuru
Warsman	Hideyuki Hori
Yosaku-san; Brocken Jr.	Tetsuo Mizutori
Kinniku Daiou; AmeRug Boss	Kazuhiko Kishino
Queen Kinniku	Nana Yamaguchi
Nachiguron	Keiko Yamamoto
Tournament Chairman; Gammalar	Yonehiko Kitagawa
Mouko-seijin	Kōji Yada
Harigorasu	Yasurō Tanaka
Mari-san	Chisato Nakajima
Iwao; Yasuhiro Nakasone	Masaharu Satō
Kinkotsuman	Issei Futamata
Detective Gobugari; Tamori	Kōji Totani*
Robin Mask	Daisuke Gōri
Rikishiman	Masashi Hirose
Ukon	Kōzō Shioya
Octopus Dragon	Chikao Ōtsuka
Special Appearance	Yudetamago

* For unknown reasons, Kōji Totani is uncredited for his appearance in this film.
