= Chie Kōjiro =

Japanese voice actress

- 神代 知衣
- Occupation: Voice actress
- Years active: 1984–present
- Agent: 81 Produce

Chie Kōjiro (神代 知衣, Kōjiro Chie) is a Japanese voice actress. She was previously affiliated with Mausu Promotion and Production Baobab, and is now affiliated with 81 Produce.

She is best known as the Japanese voice of Lisa Simpson, as well as Percy the Small Engine in the Japanese dub of Thomas & Friends beginning with Series 9, succeeding Chisato Nakajima.

== Roles ==
=== Television animation ===
- Anmitsu Hime (UFO)
- Atashin'chi (Chikuwānu)
- Bakusō Kyōdai Let's & Go!! (Tōkichi Mikuni)
- The Brave Fighter of Sun Fighbird (Momoko Yamazaki)
- Esper Mami (Teacher, younger brother)
- Digimon Data Squad (Falcomon, Peckmon, Yatagaramon, Ravemon)
- Floral Magician Mary Bell (Watch)
- Ganbare, Kickers! (Hiroko)
- Gintama (Space Okan)
- Hamtaro (Ninham-kun)
- Haré+Guu (Dama)
- Jushin Liger (Mini Knight)
- Mahōjin Guru Guru (Tomu Parotto, Sappari Fairy, Dosakusa Fairy)
- Mahou no Idol Pastel Yumi (Nobuo)
- NG Knight Lamune & 40 (Tama Q)
- Onmyō Taisenki (Koroku the Black Tortoise)
- Osomatsu-kun (Jajako)
- Peter Pan no Bōken (Pushike)
- Pretty Rhythm: Rainbow Live (Chisato Ibara/ Momo)
- Star Musketeer Bismark (Marianne Louvre)
- Sgt. Frog (Gomogomo)
- Yes! PreCure 5 (Otaka-san)

=== Video games ===
- Chaos Rings (Piu-Piu)
- Crash Team Racing (Penta Penguin)
- Dark Cloud
- Digimon World Data Squad (Falcomon)
- Kero Kero King (Super) DX (Basket-kun)

=== Dubbing roles ===
==== Live-action ====
- Peter Rabbit (Taxi driver (Sacha Horler))
- Ted 2 (Joy (Cocoa Brown))
- The Tudors (Princess Elizabeth Tudor (Kate Duggan/Claire MacCauley/Laoise Murray))
- Twin Dragons (Tong Sum (Nina Li Chi))
- Wayne's World (Stacy (Lara Flynn Boyle))

==== Animation ====
- Alvin and the Chipmunks (Theodore)
- Cats Don't Dance (Darla Dimple)
- Chuggington (Calley)
- The Simpsons (Lisa Simpson)
- Star Wars: Ewoks (Princess Kneesaa)
- Thomas the Tank Engine and Friends (Percy the Small Engine) (2008- succeeding Chisato Nakajima)
- Tiny Toon Adventures (Elmyra Duff)
