= Lightspeed Electroid Albegas =

1983 anime television series

- Screenshot from the television series depicting the super robot Albegas

光速電神アルベガス (Kōsoku Denjin Arubegasu)
- Genre: Mecha
- Anime television series
- Directed by: Kozo Morishita
- Music by: Michiaki Watanabe
- Studio: Toei Animation
- Licensed by: NA: Discotek Media
- Original network: MegaTON (TV Tokyo)
- Original run: March 30, 1983 – February 8, 1984
- Episodes: 45

Lightspeed Electroid Albegas (光速電神アルベガス, Kōsoku Denjin Arubegasu, lit. "Lightspeed Electric God Albegas") is an anime series produced by Toei Animation, that aired in Japan from 1983 to 1984. The series was also later moderately popular in Latin America, Spain and Italy during the late eighties. 45 episodes were produced, clocking in at approximately 25 minutes each. The series is also known by other translations of its title, such as "Arbegas", "Arebegas", "Lightspeed ElectroGod Arbegas" and "Arbegas: El Rayo Custodio".

== Original story and concept ==
Three talented students of Aoba Advanced Technology High School, Daisaku Enjōji, Tetsuya Jin, and Hotaru Mizuki, create award-winning robots as part of a school competition. At this time, the evil Derringer (デリンジャー, Derinjā), a brutal alien race that has subjugated most of our galaxy, plots to control the universe so its ambition is also to conquer Earth and arrive through aggressive invasion. To combat this threat, Hotaru's father, Professor Mizuki, takes the three robots and modifies them for battle. Albegas, a super robot, is born.

== Concept ==
The three individual robots form by stacking on top of one another to form a super robot called Albegas. There are six stackable formations. Each one serves a special function. Individually, the name of the robots are derived from the first three letters of the Greek alphabet (Alpha, Beta, and Gamma). Albegas' weapon of choice is the Sanbai Plasma Sword, with which he defeats enemy Derinja robots (called "Mecha-Fighters") by splitting them in half. Each robot also uses an individual sword.

== Staff ==
- Director: Kozo Morishita
- Character Designer: Shigenori Kageyama
- Mechanical Designers: Akira Hio, Hatsuo Obara, Koichi Ohata
- Animation: Hajie Kaneko, Toshio Mori
- Music: Michiaki Watanabe

== Characters ==
=== Albegas members ===
Name	Voices by
Daisaku Enjoji	Toshio Furukawa
Tetsuya Jin	Hideyuki Hori
Hotaru Mizuki	Hiromi Tsuru

=== Aoba School allies ===
Name	Voices by
Prof. Mizuki	Eiji Kanie
Goro Kumai	Kōzō Shioya
Saeko Asabuki	Chiyoko Kawashima
Prof. Danko Kibi	Noriko Tsukase

=== Derinja (Derringer) Civilization ===
A race of purple-skinned beings led by Grand Deram, a sentient being made of energy which lives in the center of the Derinja's home planet Deram. "President" Azass is the leader of the invading force stationed at his orbital base and Generalissimo Duston his top army officer, until they are replaced in Episode 29 by Bios and his lieutenant Dari.

Their giant robots, called "Mecha-Fighters" and often prefixed with "Mecha-", act as monsters of the week. A few are piloted, and the pilot is usually killed when Albegas splits their Mecha-Fighter in half. Duston (in Episode 27), Azass (Episode 29) and Bios (Episode 45) suffer this fate as well, while Dari (Episode 44) is badly hurt but taken prisoner by the Albegas staff, dying later in their headquarters.

All remaining Derinja (as well as Bios' second orbital base/mothership) are dematerialized in Episode 45 when Albegas destroys Grand Deram and makes the Deram planet explode.

Name	Voices by
President Azass	Eiji Kanie
President Bios	Hidekatsu Shibata
Generalissimo (Shogun) Duston	Masaharu Satō
Generalissimo Dari	Masaharu Satō
Commander Katastra	Kōji Totani
Commander Mira Zero	Satomi Majima
Officer Dime	Reizō Nomoto
Grand Deram	Masaharu Satō

== Robots ==
Configuration	Color	Pilot
Alpha Robo	Black	Daisaku Enjoji
Beta Robo	Blue	Tetsuya Jin
Gamma Robo	Red	Hotaru Mizuki

A friend of the three pilots, Goro, also piloted the comic relief Gori Robo (in the tradition of Boss Borot from Mazinger Z).

== Stackable configurations ==
Albegas Mode	Abilities	Stack (top to bottom)	Albegas Colors
Denjin Dimension (Electroid Dimension)	Basic fighting mode, best for finishing off enemies.	Alpha, Beta, Gamma	Black, Blue, Red
Magma Dimension	Able to fight underground and in hot environments.	Beta, Gamma, Alpha	Blue, Red, Black
Space Dimension	For outer space battles.	Alpha, Gamma, Beta	Black, Red, Blue
Marine Dimension	For battles in water.	Gamma, Alpha, Beta	Red, Black, Blue
Guard Dimension	Defensive.	Gamma, Beta, Alpha	Red, Blue, Black
Sky Dimension	For flying through the atmosphere.	Beta, Alpha, Gamma	Blue, Black, Red

When combined, the first listed robot forms the upper torso, head, arms, and thighs of Albegas, the second robot listed forms the midriff, upper backpack, and the backs of the lower legs, and the third robot forms the waist, the lower backpack, and the prominent portion of the lower legs.

== Super Abega and New Super Abega ==
In the beginning of the series, each pilot also used a smaller aircraft, which was flown in through small hatches into the backs of the robots in order to pilot the robots. The three aircraft could also combine into a single jet called the Super Abega.

They were very quickly replaced by a different set of small aircraft that could transform into different bipedal droid forms, and similarly combined into the New Super Abega.

Original Jet	Transforming Jet/Robot	Pilot
Jet Alpha	New Jet Alpha/Jetrobo Alpha	Daisaku Enjoji
Jet Beta	New Jet Beta/Jetrobo Beta	Tetsuya Jin
Jet Gamma	New Jet Gamma/Jetrobo Gamma	Mizuki Hotaru

== Voltron and Albegas ==
Albegas was intended to be incorporated into the Voltron universe as the third portion of the Voltron: Defender of the Universe series, but due to the extreme popularity of the GoLion-derived Voltron and lack of popularity of the Dairugger XV–adapted portion of the series, the plan was ultimately scrapped in favor of a season of newly animated "Lion Voltron" episodes commissioned specifically for the American show. However, die-cast Albegas toys were still released as "Voltron II" (a.k.a., "Gladiator Voltron") in the Matchbox Voltron toyline, and Albegas made a brief appearance as Gladiator Voltron in the Voltron comic book series.

== Episodes ==
No.	Title	Directed by	Written by	Original release date
1	"The Brave of Aoba School" "Aoba Gakuen no Yūsha" (Japanese: 青葉学園の勇者)	Kozo Morishita	Akiyoshi Sakai	March 30, 1983
2	"Burn! Albegas" "Moero! Arubegasu" (Japanese: 燃えろ! アルベガス)	Masamitsu Sasaki	Akiyoshi Sakai	April 6, 1983
3	"The Targeted Aoba School" "Nerawareta Aoba Gakuen" (Japanese: 狙われた青葉学園)	Directed by : Masao Ito; Storyboarded by : Shigeyasu Yamauchi	Akiyoshi Sakai	April 13, 1983
4	"My Space Creature DK" "Boku no Uchū Seibutsu DK" (Japanese: ぼくの宇宙生物DK)	Takashi Hisaoka; Keiji Namisato	Akiyoshi Sakai	April 20, 1983
5	"The Unbalanced Love Strategy" "Koi no Anbaransu Sakusen" (Japanese: 恋のアンバランス作戦)	Masamitsu Sasaki; Keiji Namisato	Shozo Uehara	April 27, 1983
6	"Revolt of the Gold Prize Robot" "Kinshō Robo no Hanran" (Japanese: 金賞ロボの反乱)	Takao Yoshizawa; Takeyoshi Matsushita	Shozo Uehara	May 4, 1983
7	"Male Gorirobo's Greatest Achievement" "Otoko Gorirobo Ichibante Gara" (Japanese: 男ゴリロボ一番手柄)	Keiji Namisato	Shozo Uehara	May 11, 1983
8	"Princess of Aoba School" "Aoba Gakuen no Kaguya-hime" (Japanese: 青葉学園のかぐや姫)	Kozo Morishita; Keiji Namisato	Shozo Uehara	May 18, 1983
9	"Phantom Thief X - There Are Two Tetsuyas" "Kaitō X - Tetsuya ga Futari" (Japanese: 怪盗X・哲也が二人)	Directed by : Takeyoshi Matsushita; Storyboarded by : Yoshikata Nitta	Shozo Uehara	May 25, 1983
10	"Journey of Love for Danko-sensei" "Danko-sensei no Renai Ryokō" (Japanese: ダン子先生の恋愛旅行)	Masayuki Akehi; Keiji Namisato	Akiyoshi Sakai	June 1, 1983
11	"Roid Disappears into the Aurora" "Ōrora ni Kieta Roido" (Japanese: オーロラに消えたロイド)	Directed by : Keiji Namisato; Storyboarded by : Masamune Ochiai	Akiyoshi Sakai	June 8, 1983
12	"Immortal Flying Whale" "Kuhibu Fujimi Kujira" (Japanese: 空飛ぶ不死身くじら)	Shigeyasu Yamauchi; Takeyoshi Matsushita	Shozo Uehara	June 15, 1983
13	"Albegas Encyclopedia" "Arubegasu Daihyakka" (Japanese: アルベガス大百科)	Kozo Morishita	Shozo Uehara; Akiyoshi Sakai	June 22, 1983
14	"Birth of New Super Abega" "Nyū Sūpā Abega Tanjo" (Japanese: ニュー・スーパーアベガ誕生)	Masayuki Akehi; Keiji Namisato	Akiyoshi Sakai	June 29, 1983
15	"Discover the Secrets of Albegas!" "Arubegasu no Himitsu wo Sagure!" (Japanese: アルベガスの秘密を探れ!)	Directed by : Masao Ito; Storyboarded by : Masamune Ochiai	Akiyoshi Sakai	July 6, 1983
16	"Slay the Invisible Enemy!" "Mienai Kana wo Kiru!" (Japanese: 見えない敵を斬る!)	Directed by : Keiji Namisato; Storyboarded by : Masamitsu Sasaki	Shozo Uehara	July 13, 1983
17	"Mother of Derinja" "Derinjā no Haha" (Japanese: デリンジャーの母)	Shigeyasu Yamauchi; Takeyoshi Matsushita	Shozo Uehara	July 20, 1983
18	"Tetsuya's Bride is 15 Years Old" "Tetsuya no Hanayome wa 15-sai" (Japanese: 哲也の花嫁は15才)	Kozo Morishita; Takeyoshi Matsushita	Shozo Uehara	July 27, 1983
19	"Our Beloved Leader" "Oretachi no Itoshita Banchō" (Japanese: 俺たちの愛した番長)	Masayuki Akehi; Keiji Namisato	Akiyoshi Sakai	August 3, 1983
20	"Adam Goro and Eve Hotaru" "Adamu Gorō to Ibu Hotaru" (Japanese: アダム五郎とイブほたる)	Directed by : Masao Ito; Storyboarded by : Masamune Ochiai	Akiyoshi Sakai	August 10, 1983
21	"Robot Sumo Conspiracy" "Robotto Ōzumo no Inbō" (Japanese: ロボット大相撲の陰謀)	Takao Yoshizawa; Takeyoshi Matsushita	Shozo Uehara	August 17, 1983
22	"Vacations are Full of Orcas!" "Bakansu wa Shachi ga Ippai!" (Japanese: バカンスはシャチが一杯!)	Shigeyasu Yamauchi; Keiji Namisato	Akiyoshi Sakai	August 24, 1983
23	"The Myth of Father and Son" "Chichi to Ko no Shinwa" (Japanese: 父と子の神話)	Johei Matsura; Takeyoshi Matsushita	Shozo Uehara	August 31, 1983
24	"Tears of the Great Deran" "Idainaru Deran no Namida" (Japanese: 偉大なるデランの涙)	Masayuki Akehi; Keiji Namisato	Shozo Uehara	September 7, 1983
25	"Albegas Broadcast" "Arubegasu Daihōsō" (Japanese: アルベガス大放送)	Kozo Morishita	Akiyoshi Sakai; Shozo Uehara	September 14, 1983
26	"Devil Messenger Bios" "Akuma no Shisha Baiosu" (Japanese: 悪魔の使者バイオス)	Toshihiko Arisako; Takeyoshi Matsushita	Shozo Uehara	September 21, 1983
27	"The End of General Duston" "Dasuton Shōgun no Saigo" (Japanese: ダストン将軍の最期)	Directed by : Keiji Namisato; Storyboarded by : Masamune Ochiai	Shozo Uehara	September 28, 1983
28	"Bury Bios in Darkness" "Baiosu wo Yami ni Homure" (Japanese: バイオスを闇に葬れ)	Takao Yoshizawa; Takeyoshi Matsushita	Shozo Uehara	October 5, 1983
29	"Attack! Fort Derinja" "Shūrai! Derinjā Yosai" (Japanese: 襲来! デリンジャー要塞)	Masayuki Akehi; Keiji Namisato	Shozo Uehara	October 12, 1983
30	"Galaxy Express Panic" "Gingatetsudō Panikku" (Japanese: 銀河鉄道パニック)	Kozo Morishita; Takeyoshi Matsushita	Shozo Uehara	October 26, 1983
31	"Hotaru is a Passionate Pro-Wrestling Fanatic" "Hotaru wa Netsuretsu Puroresu Kyō" (Japanese: ほたるは熱烈プロレス狂)	Toshihiko Arisako; Keiji Namisato	Akiyoshi Sakai	November 2, 1983
32	"Kill! Tamasaburo of the Backstreets" "Hissatsu! Uramachi no Tama Saburō" (Japanese: 必殺! 裏町の玉三郎)	Masayuki Akehi	Akiyoshi Sakai	November 9, 1983
33	"Hell's Tutor" "Jigoku no Kateikyoshi" (Japanese: 地獄の家庭教師)	Masao Ito	Akiyoshi Sakai	November 16, 1983
34	"Sad Warrior of Love" "Kanashi Kikoi no Senshi" (Japanese: 哀しき恋の戦士)	Directed by : Johei Matsura; Storyboarded by : Masamune Ochiai	Akiyoshi Sakai	November 23, 1983
35	"Heart-Pounding Treasure Hunt" "Mune Kyun Takara Sagashi" (Japanese: 胸キュン宝探し)	Shigeyasu Yamauchi; Keiji Namisato	Akiyoshi Sakai	November 30, 1983
36	"The Story of Natsuko and Koro" "Natsuko to Koro no Monogatari" (Japanese: 夏子とコロの物語)	Masayuki Akehi	Akiyoshi Sakai	December 7, 1983
37	"Desert Avenger" "Sabaku no Fukushuki" (Japanese: 砂漠の復讐鬼)	Takao Yoshizawa	Shozo Uehara	December 14, 1983
38	"Snow Falls in Africa" "Afurika ni Yuki ga Furu" (Japanese: アフリカに雪が降る)	Toshihiko Arisako; Johei Matsura	Akiyoshi Sakai	December 21, 1983
39	"Albegas Gathering" "Arubegasu Daishūgō" (Japanese: アルベガス大集合)	Kozo Morishita	Akiyoshi Sakai; Shozo Uehara	December 28, 1983
40	"New Year's Card from Space" "Uchū Kara no Nengajo" (Japanese: 宇宙からの年賀状)	Directed by : Keiji Namisato; Storyboarded by : Masamune Ochiai	Akiyoshi Sakai	January 4, 1984
41	"Fuhrer's War Game" "Sōtō no Senso Gēmu" (Japanese: 総統の戦争ゲーム)	Shigeyasu Yamauchi; Johei Matsura	Shozo Uehara	January 11, 1984
42	"Julia Forever" "Eien no Juria" (Japanese: 永遠のジュリア)	Masayuki Akehi	Shozo Uehara	January 18, 1984
43	"Duel of Love and Death" "Ai to Shi no Ketto" (Japanese: 愛と死の決闘)	Shigeyasu Yamauchi; Keiji Namisato	Hiroshi Okawa	January 25, 1984
44	"The Approaching Planet Deran" "Semari Kuru Deran Hoshi" (Japanese: 迫り来るデラン星)	Masayuki Akehi; Johei Matsura	Toyohiro Ando	February 1, 1984
45	"Albegas Forever" "Arubegasu yo Eien ni" (Japanese: アルベガスよ永遠に)	Directed by : Keiji Namisato; Storyboarded by : Masamune Ochiai	Toyohiro Ando	February 8, 1984

== Arcade game ==
Albegas was a laserdisc arcade game produced by Sega, with Toei Animation producing the animation for it. It was released in Japan in March 1984.

In Japan, Game Machine magazine listed Albegas on their July 1, 1984 issue as being the tenth most-successful upright/cockpit arcade unit of the month. In North America, it was going to be published by Bally Midway for the U.S. under the title of Cybernaut and a prototype video was made to demonstrate what the game would be like. However, the release of the game was cancelled.
