= Mōretsu Atarō =

Japanese manga and television series

もーれつア太郎
- Genre: Comedy
- Manga
- Written by: Fujio Akatsuka
- Published by: Shogakukan
- Magazine: Weekly Shōnen Sunday
- Original run: 1967 – 1970
- Anime television series
- Music by: Akihiko Yoshida
- Studio: Toei Animation
- Original network: NET
- Original run: April 4, 1969 – December 25, 1970
- Episodes: 90
- Anime television series
- Directed by: Junichi Sato
- Music by: Akihiko Yoshida
- Studio: Toei Animation
- Original network: ANN (TV Asahi)
- Original run: April 21, 1990 – December 22, 1990
- Episodes: 34

Mōretsu Atarō (もーれつア太郎; "Fierce Atarō") is a Japanese comedy manga series written by Fujio Akatsuka. It was serialized from 1967 to 1970 in Weekly Shōnen Sunday. Two anime television adaptations were produced by Toei Doga (now known as Toei Animation), and aired by TV Asahi (then called NET TV). The 60s version of this anime ran for 90 episodes and the 1990s version ran for 34 episodes.

== Plot ==
The plot revolves around a young edokko named Atarō who lives with his father X-gorō (read as Batsu-gorō) in downtown Tokyo running the family store. After his father's sudden death, Atarō must take care of the store himself and, along with the help of his father's ghost, his friend Dekoppachi, former yakuza leader Butamatsu, and a nutty alley cat named Nyarome, he protects it from the tanuki-faced gang leader Kokoro Boss.

== Cast ==
Atarō (ア太郎)

(Voice: Keiko Yamamoto (1st); Tomoko Maruo (2nd))

The initial main character of the series, Ataro is a 10-year-old boy who runs a vegetable store in Tokyo with his father. He is serious and hard working but also sensitive.

X-gorō (×五郎)

(Voice: Ichirō Nagai (1st); Sanji Hase (2nd))

Ataro's father. He is killed when he falls out of a tree while trying to retrieve a young kids balloon. Because of the way his name is spelt, he could not enter heaven and was allowed back down to earth. However, since his body was cremated, he is stuck on earth as a ghost that only Ataro can see.

Nyarome (ニャロメ)

(Voice: Hiroshi Ōtake (1st); Akira Kamiya (2nd))

An alley cat who walks on two legs and can speak like a human. He is stubborn and mischievous, and often hits on human women.

Dekoppachi (デコッ八)

(Voice: Midori Katō (1st); Kyōko Tongū (2nd))

A 10-year-old boy and Ataro's best friend. Dekoppachi has a short temper and a strong sense of justice. He was named by a reader.

Butamatsu (ブタ松)

(Voice: Kōsei Tomita (1st); Yō Yoshimura (2nd))

A former Yakuza leader who leads a gang of pigs.

Kokoro Boss (ココロのボス)

(Voice: Jōji Yanami (both series))

An unusual man. Whether he is a tanuki or a human is unknown.

Kopun A (コプンA)

(Voice: Keiichi Noda (1st); Toshio Kobayashi (2nd))

One of Kokoro Boss's henchmen. He is the taller one of the two.

Kopun B (コプンB)

(Voice: Isamu Tanonaka (1st); Shinobu Satōchi (2nd))

One of Kokoro Boss's henchmen. He is the shorter one of the two.

God (神様)

(Voice: Takuzō Kamiyama (1st); Isamu Tanonaka (2nd))

God's Pupil (Voice: Masako Nozawa (1st); Mie Suzuki (2nd))

Kumagorō (Voice: Yonehiko Kitagawa (1st); Masaharu Satō (2nd))

Kumagorō's wife (Voice: Mariko Tsuda (1st); Noriko Uemura (2nd))

Kemunpas (ケムンパス)

(Voice: Keiichi Noda (1st); Keiichi Nanba (2nd))

A young caterpillar who is friends with Nyarome and Beshi. He is often used where a caterpillar may be needed, to dispense some commentary or advice or just crawl about.

Beshi (べし)

(Voice: Kōsei Tomita (1st); Kōzō Shioya (2nd))

A frog offering exposition or hanging out with Nyarome and Kemunpas.

Doctor Fukuwarai (Voice: Kiyoshi Kobayashi (2nd only))

A doctor with an unusual face consisting of a wrinkled mouth and sagging eyes. He uses saws and other heavy tools in his surgery and considers his work to be artistic, as he can expertly re-arrange faces and bodies to mind-boggling results.

Momoko (Voice: Aya Hisakawa (2nd only))

- Kōban Officer (Voice: Kazumi Tanaka (2nd only))

=== Cameos ===
The first anime featured cameo appearances by several characters from other Akatsuka works.

- Iyami (Osomatsu-kun) (Voice: Yonehiko Kitagawa)
- Chibita (Osomatsu-kun) (Voice: Kazue Tagami, Masako Nozawa)
- Totoko (Osomatsu-kun) (Voice: Kazuko Sugiyama)
- Dekapan (Osomatsu-kun)
- Hatabo (Osomatsu-kun)
- Matsuzo (Osomatsu-kun)
- Matsuyo (Osomatsu-kun)
- Hagechibi (Osomatsu-kun)
- Honkan-san (Tensai Bakabon) (Voice: Isamu Tanonaka, Keiichi Noda, and others)
- Bakabon no Papa (Tensai Bakabon) (Voice: Jōji Yanami)
- Rerere (Tensai Bakabon)
