= List of Dr. Slump films =

- Dr. Slump
- Cover of Dr. Slump: The Theatrical Movies 1-5 as released by Discotek Media

Dr.スランプ (Dokutā Suranpu)
- Genre: Comedy, Fantasy, Science fiction
- Anime film

Dr. Slump and Arale-chan: Hello! Wonder Island
- Directed by: Minoru Okazaki
- Written by: Toshiki Inoue
- Music by: Shunsuke Kikuchi
- Studio: Toei Animation
- Licensed by: NA: Discotek Media
- Released: July 18, 1981
- Runtime: 25 minutes
- Anime film

Dr. Slump: "Hoyoyo!" Space Adventure
- Directed by: Akinori Nagaoka
- Written by: Toshiki Inoue; Michiru Shimada; Shun'ichi Yukimuro; Tomoko Konparu
- Music by: Shunsuke Kikuchi
- Studio: Toei Animation
- Licensed by: NA: Discotek Media
- Released: July 10, 1982
- Runtime: 90 minutes
- Anime film

Dr. Slump and Arale-chan: Hoyoyo! The Great Race Around the World
- Directed by: Minoru Okazaki
- Written by: Toshiki Inoue
- Music by: Shunsuke Kikuchi
- Studio: Toei Animation
- Licensed by: NA: Discotek Media
- Released: March 13, 1983
- Runtime: 52 minutes
- Anime film

Dr. Slump and Arale-chan: Hoyoyo! The Secret of Nanaba Castle
- Directed by: Hiroki Shibata
- Written by: Michiru Shimada; Yoshifumi Yuki
- Music by: Shunsuke Kikuchi
- Studio: Toei Animation
- Licensed by: NA: Discotek Media
- Released: December 22, 1984
- Runtime: 48 minutes
- Anime film

Dr. Slump and Arale-chan: Hoyoyo! The City of Dreams, Mechapolis
- Directed by: Kazuhisa Takenouchi; Toyoo Ashida
- Written by: Michiru Shimada; Keiji Terui
- Music by: Shunsuke Kikuchi
- Studio: Toei Animation
- Licensed by: NA: Discotek Media
- Released: July 13, 1985
- Runtime: 38 minutes
- Anime film

Dr. Slump and Arale-chan: N-cha! Clear Skies Over Penguin Village
- Directed by: Yukio Kaizawa
- Written by: Aya Matsui
- Music by: Shunsuke Kikuchi
- Studio: Toei Animation
- Released: March 6, 1993
- Runtime: 40 minutes
- Anime film

Dr. Slump and Arale-chan: N-cha! From Penguin Village with Love
- Directed by: Mitsuo Hashimoto
- Written by: Aya Matsui
- Music by: Shunsuke Kikuchi
- Studio: Toei Animation
- Released: July 10, 1993
- Runtime: 32 minutes
- Anime film

Dr. Slump and Arale-chan: Hoyoyo!! Follow the Rescued Shark...
- Directed by: Mitsuo Hashimoto
- Written by: Aya Matsui
- Music by: Shunsuke Kikuchi
- Studio: Toei Animation
- Released: March 12, 1994
- Runtime: 25 minutes
- Anime film

Dr. Slump and Arale-chan: N-cha!! Excited Heart of Summer Vacation
- Directed by: Mitsuo Hashimoto
- Written by: Aya Matsui
- Music by: Shunsuke Kikuchi
- Studio: Toei Animation
- Released: July 9, 1994
- Runtime: 20 minutes
- Anime film

Doctor Slump: Arale's Surprise Burn
- Directed by: Shigeyasu Yamauchi
- Written by: Yoshimi Narita
- Music by: Dig·It·A·Go
- Studio: Toei Animation
- Released: March 6, 1999
- Runtime: 50 minutes
- Anime film

Dr. Slump: Dr. Mashirito - Abale-chan
- Directed by: Tatsuya Nagamine
- Studio: Toei Animation
- Released: March 3, 2007
- Runtime: 5 minutes

Since the debut of the anime adaptation of Akira Toriyama's Dr. Slump manga series in 1981, Toei Animation (formerly Toei Doga) has produced 11 animated films based on the franchise.

In 2008, all eleven films were released in a remastered DVD box set titled Slump the Box Movies on September 21. On June 12, 2013, Discotek Media announced they acquired the first five Dr. Slump films for release in North America. They released all five in a two-disc DVD box set in Japanese with English subtitles on July 29, 2014.

== 1980s films ==
Film	Japan release date	Directed by	Written by	Produced by
Dr. Slump and Arale-chan: Hello! Wonder Island	July 18, 1981	Minoru Okazaki	Toshiki Inoue	Matsuji Kishimoto
Dr. Slump: "Hoyoyo!" Space Adventure	July 10, 1982	Akinori Nagaoka	Toshiki Inoue, Michiru Shimada, Shun'ichi Yukimuro & Tomoko Konparu	Matsuji Kishimoto
Dr. Slump and Arale-chan: Hoyoyo! The Great Race Around the World	March 13, 1983	Minoru Okazaki	Toshiki Inoue	Matsuji Kishimoto
Dr. Slump and Arale-chan: Hoyoyo! The Secret of Nanaba Castle	December 22, 1984	Hiroki Shibata	Michiru Shimada & Yoshifumi Yuki	Matsuji Kishimoto
Dr. Slump and Arale-chan: Hoyoyo! The City of Dreams, Mechapolis	July 13, 1985	Kazuhisa Takenouchi & Toyoo Ashida	Michiru Shimada & Keiji Terui	Chiaki Imada

The first film was produced just three months after the anime started, being shown at the Toei Manga Festival (東映まんがまつり, Tōei Manga Matsuri) alongside One Hundred and One Dalmatians and Taiyo Sentai Sun Vulcan. Dr. Slump and Arale-chan: Hello! Wonder Island (Dr.スランプ アラレちゃん ハロー!不思議島, Dokutā Suranpu Arare-chan Harō! Wandā Airando) was released on July 18, 1981. It adapts chapters 32 and 33 of the manga, following as Senbei Norimaki travels to Wonder Island in order to acquire an ingredient for a love potion. It was released on VHS on August 14, 1987. An anime comic adaptation was released in March 1995.

Dr. Slump: "Hoyoyo!" Space Adventure (Dr.SLUMP ほよよ! 宇宙大冒険, Dokutā Suranpu Hoyoyo! Uchū Dai Bōken) entered theaters on July 10, 1982. It follows Senbei and the other main characters as they venture into space to save Midori Yamabuki from being forced to marry the galactic tyrant Mashirito. A novelization written by one of the screenwriters Shun'ichi Yukimuro was released on July 15, 1982. The film was released on VHS on December 15, 1984. An anime comic adaptation was released in April 1995. The anime comics of the first and second films were collected together and released under the Shueisha Jump Remix imprint in December 2006. The soundtrack to the film was released on September 22, 2004, by Columbia Music Entertainment under the title Dr. Slump Music Collection (Dr.SLUMP 音楽集, Dokutā Suranpu Ongaku-shū).

Dr. Slump and Arale-chan: Hoyoyo! The Great Race Around the World (Dr.スランプ アラレちゃん ほよよ!世界一周大レース, Dokutā Suranpu Arare-chan Hoyoyo Sekai Isshū Dai-Rēsu) was released on March 13, 1983. The main characters and others enter the Around the World Grand Prix, racing to marry a princess or win a hefty monetary prize. It was shown at the Toei Manga Festival alongside Batten Robomaru Obakekau Shōjo, Kagaku Sentai Dynaman and Aesop's Fable. It was released on VHS on January 14, 1987. An anime comic adaptation was released in June 1995.

Dr. Slump and Arale-chan: Hoyoyo! The Secret of Nanaba Castle (Dr.スランプ アラレちゃん ほよよ!ナナバ城の秘宝, Dokutā Suranpu Arare-chan Hoyoyo! Nanaba-jō no Hihō) was released on December 22, 1984. Set in 1929, several parties try to steal the Rainbow Eye, which can grant any wish. It was shown at the Toei Manga Festival alongside Space Sheriff Shaider and Kinnikuman Great Riot! Seigi Choujin. It was released on VHS on February 21, 1985. An anime comic adaptation was released in August 1995. The anime comics of the third and fourth films were collected together and released under the Shueisha Jump Remix imprint in January 2007.

Dr. Slump and Arale-chan: Hoyoyo! The City of Dreams, Mechapolis (Dr.スランプ アラレちゃん ほよよ!夢の都メカポリス, Dokutā Suranpu Arare-chan Hoyoyo! Yume no Miyako Mekaporisu) was released on July 13, 1985. The children of Penguin Village appear in Mechapolis, where anything they can imagine appears made out of mecha. It was shown at the Toei Manga Festival alongside Captain Tsubasa: Europe Daikessen, Kinnikuman Counterattack! The Underground Space Choujins and Dengeki Sentai Changeman: Shuttle Base! Close Call. It was released on VHS on November 21, 1985. An anime comic adaptation was released in September 1995.

== 1990s films ==
Film	Japan release date	Directed by	Written by	Produced by
Dr. Slump and Arale-chan: N-cha! Clear Skies Over Penguin Village	March 6, 1993	Yukio Kaizawa	Aya Matsui	Chiaki Imada & Tomio Anzai
Dr. Slump and Arale-chan: N-cha! From Penguin Village with Love	July 10, 1993	Mitsuo Hashimoto	Aya Matsui	Chiaki Imada & Tomio Anzai
Dr. Slump and Arale-chan: Hoyoyo! Follow the Rescued Shark...	March 12, 1994	Mitsuo Hashimoto	Aya Matsui	Tsutomu Tomari & Tomio Anzai
Dr. Slump and Arale-chan: N-cha! Excited Heart of Summer Vacation	July 9, 1994	Mitsuo Hashimoto	Aya Matsui	Tan Takaiwa, Tomio Anzai & Tsutomu Tomari
Doctor Slump: Arale's Surprise Burn	March 6, 1999	Shigeyasu Yamauchi	Yoshimi Narita	Tan Takaiwa, Teruo Tamamura & Tsutomu Tomari

Dr. Slump and Arale-chan: N-cha! Clear Skies Over Penguin Village (Dr.スランプ アラレちゃん んちゃ!ペンギン村はハレのち晴れ, Dokutā Suranpu Arare-chan N-cha! Pengin-mura wa Hare nochi Hare) was released on March 6, 1993. It was shown at the Toei Anime Fair (東映アニメフェア, Toei Anime Fea) alongside Dragon Ball Z: Broly – The Legendary Super Saiyan. An anime comic adaptation was released in July 1993. The film was released on VHS on October 8, 1993.

Dr. Slump and Arale-chan: N-cha! From Penguin Village with Love (Dr.スランプ アラレちゃん んちゃ!ペンギン村より愛をこめて, Dokutā Suranpu Arare-chan N-cha! Pengin-mura yori Ai wo Komete) was released on July 10, 1993. It was shown at the Toei Anime Fair alongside Dragon Ball Z: Bojack Unbound and YuYu Hakusho. An anime comic adaptation was released in November 1993. The film was released on VHS on April 8, 1994.

Dr. Slump and Arale-chan: Hoyoyo!! Follow the Rescued Shark... (Dr.スランプ アラレちゃん ほよよ!!助けたサメに連れられて…, Dokutā Suranpu Arare-chan Hoyoyo!! Tasuketa Same ni Tsurerarete...) was released on March 12, 1994. It was shown at the Toei Anime Fair alongside Dragon Ball Z: Broly – Second Coming and Slam Dunk. It was released on VHS on November 11, 1994. An anime comic adaptation was released in December 1994.

Dr. Slump and Arale-chan: N-cha!! Excited Heart of Summer Vacation (Dr.スランプ アラレちゃん んちゃ!!わくわくハートの夏休み, Dokutā Suranpu Arare-chan N-cha!! Wakuwaku Hāto no Natsu Yasumi) was released on July 9, 1994. It was shown at the Toei Anime Fair alongside Dragon Ball Z: Bio-Broly and Slam Dunk: Zenkoku Seiha da! Sakuragi Hanamichi. An anime comic adaptation was released in February 1995. The film was released on VHS on April 14, 1995.

Doctor Slump: Arale's Surprise Burn (ドクタースランプ アラレのびっくりバーン, Dokutā Suranpu: Arare no Bikkuri Bān) released on March 6, 1999, is the only film produced during the broadcast of the second anime adaptation. It was shown at the Toei Anime Fair alongside the Yu-Gi-Oh! and Digimon Adventure films. Comedy duo Kyaeen provide guest voices. It was released on VHS on September 10, 1999.

== Dr. Mashirito and Abale-chan ==
Film	Japan release date	Directed by	Written by	Produced by
Dr. Slump: Dr. Mashirito - Abale-chan	March 3, 2007	Tatsuya Nagamine	Akira Toriyama	Atsutoshi Umezawa & Yosuke Asama

To promote the release of the first Dr. Slump - Arale-chan anime DVD box set, Toriyama drew a one-shot manga published in the April 2007 issue of Monthly Shōnen Jump. It was adapted into a five-minute short titled Dr. Slump: Dr. Mashirito and Abale-chan (Dr.SLUMP Dr.マシリト アバレちゃん, Dokutā Suranpu: Doctor Mashirito Abare-chan) that entered theaters alongside One Piece Movie: The Desert Princess and the Pirates: Adventures in Alabasta on March 3, 2007. The story centers around an evil counterpart of Arale created by Dr. Mashirito Jr., named Abale. It was later included alongside all the other films in the DVD box set Slump the Box Movies, released on September 21, 2008.

== Reception ==
Reviewing the first five movies, Carl Kimlinger of Anime News Network summarized Dr. Slump as "random silly adventures[...] delivered with a lot of surreal nonsense humor, only the most basic sense of continuity, and not a whiff of substance or seriousness." He believed that a large portion of the humor simply comes from the graphics, saying that the old-fashioned hand-drawn animation and art provide a "warmth" and "lift Slump's visuals above" that of other anime. However, he called the background music "non-descript" and stated that the films are only for viewers who are familiar with the series, as they provide no exposition.

Mike Toole, also of ANN, included "Hoyoyo!" Space Adventure at number 75 on The Other 100 Best Anime Movies of All Time, a list of "lesser-known, lesser-loved classics." He called it an "artfully silly poke at the sci-fi boom of the late 70s and early 80s, skewering everything from Close Encounters of the Third Kind to THX-1138," yet also including "poop jokes, booger jokes, Ultraman references, dumb comedy routines, and weirdly evocative, exciting space battles."
