= The Wonderful Adventures of Nils (TV series) =

Television series

- Cover of the DVD release of the compilation film by Gakken
- ニルスのふしぎな旅
- Genre: Adventure, fantasy
- Based on: The Wonderful Adventures of Nils by Selma Lagerlöf
- Directed by: Hisayuki Toriumi (chief)
- Music by: Chito Kawachi
- Country of origin: Japan
- Original language: Japanese
- No. of episodes: 52

Production
- Producers: Matsue Jinbo; Tsuneyuki Morishima; Hiroshi Hirai
- Animator: Studio Pierrot
- Production company: Gakken

Original release
- Network: NHK General TV
- Release: January 8, 1980 – March 17, 1981

The Wonderful Adventures of Nils (ニルスのふしぎな旅, Nirusu no Fushigi na Tabi) is an anime adaptation of the 1906 novel The Wonderful Adventures of Nils by Swedish author Selma Lagerlöf. The 52-episode series aired on the Japanese network NHK from January 1980 to March 1981. It was the first production by Studio Pierrot. The anime largely follows the original story, with the addition of Nils's pet hamster and an expanded role for Smirre the fox. The music was composed by Chito Kawachi.

== Plot ==
Nils Holgersson is a 14-year-old farm boy, the son of poor farmers. He is lazy and disrespectful to others. In his spare time he enjoys tormenting the animals that live on his family farm.

One Sunday, while his parents are at church and have left him home to read the day's homily in the family Bible, Nils captures a tomte in a net. In exchange for his freedom, the tomte offers Nils a large gold coin. Nils rejects the offer, so the tomte shrinks him (and accidentally his pet hamster Carrot) to a tiny size as punishment. The transformation also grants Nils the ability to understand animals's language. The farm animals are delighted to see their tormentor reduced to their size and become hungry for revenge. Meanwhile, wild geese are flying over the farm during their spring migration, and they taunt a white farm goose named Morten (whom Nils has also tormented by typing a rope around his neck). Morten decides he wants to join the wild flock, so he flies away from the farm. Escaping from the angry animals, Nils scrambles onto Morten's back with Carrot, and they join the flock of wild geese flying towards Lapland for the summer.

The wild geese, who are not pleased at all to be joined by a human boy and a domestic goose, eventually take him on an adventurous trip across all the historical provinces of Sweden. Along the way, they encounter various animals, such as Smirre the fox, the flock's sworn enemy, and Gorgo the eagle, who was raised by wild geese. Nils's adventures, as well as situations and individuals he encounters, teach him the importance of helping others and not to be selfish. In the course of the trip, Nils learns that if he can prove he has changed for the better, the tomte might be disposed to change him back to his normal size.

== Characters ==
- Nils
  - A 14-year-old boy and the main protagonist of the series, he lives with his family on a farm in southern Sweden. He is lazy and disrespectful to others and enjoys tormenting the animals on the farm. After the farm's tomte magically shrinks Nils smaller than the animals, he gains the ability to speak and understand animals' language. When the farm animals seek revenge, Nils flies away with a flock of wild geese on their migration to the north of Sweden for the summer. During his journey, he learns a lot a about compassion and friendships, but desires to be restored to his original size.
- Carrot
  - Nils's pet hamster, he shrinks along with Nils due to being on his hat when the tomte enchants him. He joins Nils on his journey and becomes one of his closest friends and confident. Carrot's name sometimes appears as Crumb.
- Morten
  - A goose originally belonging to Nils's family, he desires to go to Lapland, so he flies away from the farm, and accidentally brings Nils and Carrot along with him. On their journey, Morten does everything he can to prove himself wothy enough to fly with the wild geese. He and Nils have their differences, but eventually learn to care for each other and become true friends.
- Captain Akka (Akka of Kebnekaise)
  - The leader and matriarch of the wild geese flock, she is strict but also wise and kind-hearted. She cares very much for Nils, understanding his needs and difficulties as a human and highly values his personal growth throughout their journey. Over time, Akka's becomes both of a mentor and a guardian for Nils.
- Gunnar
  - Akka's second in command, he is a quite stern goose, but after he falls in love with Ingrid, he learns to loosen up.
- Gusta
  - An often grumpy goose and Lasse's best friend, but when Lasse marries his crush Suirii, Gusta starts to tease him. He is the only goose who does not marry.
- Lasse
  - An often hungry, fun-loving goose, he is Gusta's best friend, but their friendship goes stale when Suirii chooses Lasse over Gusta as her mate. They later make amends.
- Ingrid
  - A beautiful, elegant female goose, who warmly welcomes Morten into the flock. Later, she partners with Gunnar.
- Suirii
  - A female goose, who sings with a very high pitch voice and annoys everyone with it, she fell in love with Lasse.
- Dunfuin
  - A warm-hearted, though not very bright female goose, who joins Akka's flock after her injured wing separates her from her former flock. She marries Morten, who is madly in love with her at first sight.
- Smirre
  - A fox and the series' primary antagonist, Smirre wants to catch and eat the wild geese, but thanks to Nils, he never succeeds. Smirre follows the wild geese all the way to Lapland, motivated by a personal revenge on Nils for always humiliating him.
- Gorgo
  - A large black eagle, found in an empty nest by Akka years ago, she raised him and taught him how to survive by eating fish, instead of preying on the geese. Years later, he was captured by hunters and sold to a zoo, from where Nils saved him. Nils, Carrot and Gorgo then fly the last stretch together to Lappland, but Gorgo must stay in Lappland when the wild geese leave that place to fly south for winter.
- Ermenrich
  - The stork, who originally nested on the roof of Nils's family's house, he knows Akka and the tomte very well, and often serves as a contact maker between them, whenever Akka tries to convince the tomte to change Nils back. He often helps Nils throughout various adventures and shows them beautiful sites of Sweden.

== Original voice cast ==
- Mami Koyama as Nils
- Tadashi Yamazaki as Carrot (character original to anime)
- Yoshito Yasuhara as Morte
- Nobuko Terashima as Akka
- Hideyuki Tanaka as Gunnar
- Minori Matsushima as Ingrid
- Shigeru Chiba as Gusta
- Kenichi Ogata as Lasse
- Yoneko Matsukane as Suirii
- Kumiko Takizawa as Dunfin
- Tesshō Genda as Gorgo
- Kei Tomiyama as Lex
- Ryōji Saikachi as Fairy
- Sanji Hase as Emmerich
- Masane Tsukayama as Nils's Father
- Masako Ikeda as Nils's Mother

== Episodes ==
1. "Mischievous Nils" (8 January 1980)
2. "Shrunken Nils" (15 January 1980)
3. "Riding a Goose" (22 January 1980)
4. "SOS of the Forest Squirrels" (29 January 1980)
5. "Morten's Big Pinch" (5 February 1980)
6. "Bird Strength Contest" (12 February 1980)
7. "Battle of the Mice" (26 February 1980)
8. "The Crane's Ball" (4 March 1980)
9. "Hungry Nils" (11 March 1980)
10. "Lex's Evil Scheme" (18 March 1980)
11. "Walking Lead Statue" (25 March 1980)
12. "Morten's First Love" (1 April 1980)
13. "Goats of Hell's Valley" (8 April 1980)
14. "Phantom Town Appearing on Moonlit Nights" (15 April 1980)
15. "The Greedy Crow and the Coin Bowl" (22 April 1980)
16. "Choose a Crow Boss" (29 April 1980)
17. "Ransomed Duck Child" (6 May 1980)
18. "The Lake Disappears" (27 May 1980)
19. "Spoiled Fawn" (3 June 1980)
20. "Snake's Revenge" (10 June 1980)
21. "A Testy Witch's Prank" (17 June 1980)
22. "Bear Twins Who Prowl the Forest" (4 June 1980)
23. "Flood of Swan Lake" (1 July 1980)
24. "Operation 'To Hell with Lex the Guard Dog'" (8 July 1980)
25. "Rescue Party from the Sky" (15 July 1980)
26. "One Stormy Day" (22 July 1980)
27. "The Story Until Now / Morten's Engagement" (5 August 1980)
28. "Nils Singing on a Street Corner" (19 August 1980)
29. "Arrested Eagle" (26 August 1980)
30. "The Taste of Freshly Baked Bread" (9 September 1980)
31. "Monster of the Forest" (16 September 1980)
32. "Look Out, Nils: A Mountain Fire" (30 September 1980)
33. "Patrol of Five" first broadcast on 7 October 1980
34. "Battle of the Spirits of Sun and Ice" (14 October 1980)
35. "Goose Guard Child Looking for his Father" (21 October 1980)
36. "Bird Love" (4 November 1980)
37. "Morten the Rookie Papa" (11 November 1980)
38. "Lapland, Land Where the Sun Never Sets" (25 November 1980)
39. "Don't Follow Me, Golgo" (2 December 1980)
40. "Wolf Attack" (9 December 1980)
41. "Lake Fire Festival" (16 December 1980)
42. "Big Man Who Built a Forest" (23 December 1980)
43. "Nils's Lullaby" (13 January 1981)
44. "Bataki Shut In" (20 January 1981)
45. "Haunted House on a Full Moon" (27 January 1981)
46. "Sea Shining Silver" (3 February 1981)
47. "Main Event of the Village Festival" (10 February 1981)
48. "Lex's New Journey" (17 February 1981)
49. "Nils Discovers a Secret" (24 February 1981)
50. "Wild Goose's Present" (3 March 1981)
51. "To My Old Home" (10 March 1981)
52. "Goodbye, Akka" (17 March 1981)

== International broadcasts ==
The anime was also broadcast in Canada (in French), France, Germany, Sweden, Finland ("Peukaloisen retket" – "Thumbling's Travels"), Iceland (as "Nilli Hólmgeirsson"), the Netherlands, Belgium, Greece (as "Το θαυμαστό ταξίδι του Νίλς Χόλγκερσον" – "The Wondrous Journey of Nils Holgersson"), Bulgaria ("Чудното пътуване на Нилс Холгерсон с дивите гъски" – "The Wondrous Journey of Nils Holgersson with the Wild Geese"), Poland (as "Nils and the Wild Geese"), Portugal, Romania (as "Aventurile lui Nils Holgersson"), in the Arab world (as "مغامرات نيلز" – "Nils's Adventures"), Spain, Slovenia (as "Nils Holgerson" with only one "s"), Slovakia (again as "Nils Holgerson"), Hungary (as "Nils Holgersson csodálatos utazása a vadludakkal"), Israel (as "נילס הולגרסון" – "Nils Holgersson"), Iran (as "ماجراهای نیلز"), Turkey (as "Nils ve Uçan Kaz" – "Nils and the Flying Goose"), Italy, Hong Kong (dubbed into Cantonese), Mainland China, South Africa (in Afrikaans as "Die wonderlike avonture van Nils Holgerson"), and Albania (as "Aventurat e Nils Holgersonit"). In some countries it was edited for length to allow for commercials. In Germany, the episodes of the animated series were also combined into a full-length animated feature released in 1981; that feature was also dubbed and released in Estonia and Greece on DVD and VHS. The anime was also adapted into a German comic book series, with art by the Spanish Studio Interpublic and the German Atelier Roche.

The anime has maintained a following and was released on DVD in Japan (2002), France (2005), and North America by Discotek Media (2020). In Portugal, the series was released in 2009, but due to RTP discarding the original dub tracks, publisher Planeta DeAgostini had to gather the recordings from VHS collectors. Only episode 16 was missing and had to be redubbed.

== Home media ==
A Japanese DVD Region 2 box set of the series was produced in 2002, and a French DVD box set in 2005. The TV film was released in Bulgaria by A-design. There was also a Greek DVD (and possibly VHS) film version (which is based on the German film version) released around in 2004 by Digi Time Junior and Panta & Leon (Πάντα & Λέων) and possibly the series around 2008. Discotek Media released the TV series with subtitles in 2020. An Afrikaans DVD box set of the series was also produced.

== 1982 film ==
This film was shot in 1982 by the same technical team and director, has the same characteristics as the television series, but is independent and was shot separately. The production was dubbed in Swedish and was a VHS-only release in 1985.
