= Iwao =

Iwao (written: 巖, 巌, 岩夫, 岩尾, 岩生, 岩男 or 岩雄) is both a masculine Japanese given name and a Japanese surname. Notable people with the name include:

== Surname ==
- Emma Haruka Iwao, Japanese computer scientist and cloud developer advocate
- Junko Iwao (岩男 潤子; born 1970), Japanese voice actress and singer
- Ken Iwao (岩尾 憲; born 1988), Japanese footballer
- Sachimi Iwao (岩尾 幸美; born 1976), Japanese field hockey player
- Seiichi Iwao (岩生 成一; 1900–1988), Japanese academic, historian and writer
- Sumiko Iwao (岩男 寿美子; 1935–2018), Japanese psychologist, magazine editor and academic

== Given name ==
- Iwao Ageishi (上石 巌; 1908–1991), Japanese cross-country skier
- Iwao Aizawa (相沢 巌夫; 1906–1945), Japanese sprinter
- Iwao Akiyama (秋山 巌; 1921–2014), Japanese printmaker
- Iwao Ayusawa (鮎沢 巌; 1894–1972), Japanese diplomat
- Iwao Hakamata (袴田 巖; born 1936), Japanese boxer
- Iwao Hirose (広瀬 巌; born 1970), Japanese philosopher and economist
- Iwao Horii (堀井 巌; born 1965), Japanese politician
- Iwao Horiuchi (堀内 岩雄; born 1941), Japanese sport wrestler
- Iwao Masuda (増田 礒; 1914–????), Japanese sprinter
- Iwao Matsuda (松田 岩夫; born 1937), Japanese politician
- Iwao Matsuda (general) (松田 巌; 1895–1979), Japanese general
- Iwao Miyajima (宮嶋 巌; 1914–2005), Japanese ski jumper
- Iwao Nakayama (中山 巌; born 1949), Japanese ice hockey player
- Iwao Ohmura (大村 巌; born 1969), Japanese former Nippon Professional Baseball outfielder
- Iwao Ojima (born 1945), Japanese-American chemist
- Iwao Ōtani (大谷 巌; 1919–2017), Japanese recording engineer
- Iwao Ōyama (大山 巌; 1842–1916), Japanese field marshal
- Iwao Taka (高 巌; born 1956), Japanese academic
- Iwao Takamoto (高本 厳夫; 1925–2007), Japanese-American animator, television producer and film director
- Iwao Taki (瀧 巖; 1901-1984), Japanese malacologist
- Iwao Tokito (時任 巌; 1908–????), Japanese water polo player
- Iwao Uruma (漆間 巌; born 1945), Japanese police officer
- Iwao Yamane (山根 巌; born 1976), Japanese footballer
- Iwao Yamawaki (山脇 巌; 1898–1987), Japanese photographer
- Iwao Yamazaki (山崎 巌; 1894–1968), Japanese lawyer, politician and cabinet minister

== Fictional characters ==
- Iwao (Kinnikuman) (イワオ), a character in the manga series Kinnikuman
