= Iwao Taka =

Iwao Taka (高 巌, Taka Iwao) is a professor of business administration and noted scholar of business ethics in Japan. He was born in 1956 in Ōita Prefecture, Japan. Taka graduated the College of Foreign Language, Reitaku University and completed a Ph.D. in 1985 at the Graduate School of Commerce, Waseda University. He taught at the Wharton School of the University of Pennsylvania from 1991 to 1994, and is now a professor at Reitaku University and guest professor at the Graduate School of Management, Kyoto University. He is also a member of the Business Ethics and Compliance Research Center at Reitaku. Taka, who frequently publishes with Nikkei Business Publications, has written books on business ethics, specifically on corporate social responsibility and regulatory compliance.
