= Little Memole =

Television series

- とんがり帽子のメモル
- Genre: Fantasy; Adventure
- Developed by: Shun'ichi Yukimuro
- Directed by: Osamu Kasai
- Music by: Nozomi Aoki
- Country of origin: Japan
- Original language: Japanese
- No. of episodes: 50

Production
- Producers: Shinji Nabeshima (Asahi Broadcasting); Hiroshi Ogino (Asatsu); Yoshifumi Hatano
- Production companies: Asahi Broadcasting; Asatsu; Toei Animation

Original release
- Network: ANN (ABC, TV Asahi)
- Release: March 3, 1984 – March 3, 1985

Related
- Anime film
- Directed by: Junichi Sato
- Music by: Nozomi Aoki
- Studio: Toei Animation
- Released: March 16, 1985
- Runtime: 16 minutes
- Original video animation

Marielle no Hōsekibako
- Directed by: Isamu Tsuchida
- Music by: Nozomi Aoki
- Studio: Toei Animation
- Released: July 21, 1985
- Runtime: 75 minutes

Little Memole, also known as Wee Wendy or Tongari Bōshi no Memoru (とんがり帽子のメモル; lit. 'Memole of the Pointed Hat'), is a Japanese anime television series produced in the 1980s by Toei Animation.

== Plot ==
A group of 245 inhabitants from a planet called Riruru make a crash landing onto Earth from their spaceship. This is due to a failure in the spaceship. Aboard the spaceship is a young tiny girl named Memole which the series is centered on.

The citizens of Riruru are cautious about trying to adapt to life on Earth because of their lilliputian size, but this does not bother Memole, who is reckless and brave enough to venture with a group of friends into the city. Here she befriends a human girl named Mariel ("Muriel" in Wee Wendy), who because of her frail health, is forced to stay inside her house all of the time. After the initial surprise of seeing the little girl Memole, the two become inseparable, and their friendship grows throughout the series.

Memole also meets woodland animals and uses an owl named Bo-bo for transport.

== Cast ==
=== Japanese ===
- Toshio Furukawa - Ryukkuman
- Junko Hori - Michelle (ep 34)
- Reiko Katsura - Barbara
- Chiyoko Kawashima - Popit
- Kōhei Miyauchi - Riruru
- Isao Nagahisa - Oscar
- Ichirō Nagai - Forten
- Kumiko Nishihara - Pi
- Masaharu Satō - Cinthia's Father (ep 36)
- Kazuko Sawada - Rupang
- Kōzō Shioya - George, Koronbasu
- Fuyumi Shiraishi - Grace
- Isamu Tanonaka - Garagon
- Kei Tomiyama - Berunaru
- Naoko Watanabe - Memoru
- Nana Yamaguchi - Penelope
- Jouji Yanami - Mariel's dentist (ep 3), Monica's Grandfather (ep 35)
- Yūsaku Yara - Torilone
- Akie Yasuda - Marielle

=== English ===
- Mona Marshall
- Jan Rabson
- Kathy Ritter
- Richard Rossner
