= Tetsuo Mizutori =

Japanese voice actor (1938–2010)

- 水鳥 鐵夫
- Born: December 25, 1938; Tokyo Prefecture, Japan
- Died: July 14, 2010 (aged 71); Tokyo, Japan
- Occupation: Voice actor
- Years active: 1967–2010
- Agent: Arts Vision

Tetsuo Mizutori (水鳥 鐵夫, Mizutori Tetsuo; December 25, 1938 – July 14, 2010) was a Japanese voice actor from Tokyo who was attached to Arts Vision at the time of his death. His family name and his first name are often misprinted as "Mizushima" (水島) and "Tetsuya" (鉄矢) by numerous journals. He was a lecturer in the Katsuta Voice Actor's Academy and starred in a number of Studio Pierrot series in the 1980s.

== Voice roles ==
=== Television animation ===
- Anime Sanjūshi (1987) (Inn Proprietor (episodes 16 and 17))

Unknown date

- Ashita no Joe 2 (Tōno)
- Blue Comet SPT Layzner (Chifurenko)
- Captain Tsubasa (Misaki's Father)
- Chikkun Takkun (Chikkun's Father)
- Cooking Papa (Osamu Fukai (second voice))
- Dragon Ball (Kurigashira-sensei, Dog)
- Dragon Ball Z (Zorudo)
- Dr. Slump: Arale-chan (Kurigashira-sensei, Dog, Doctor Usune)
- Esper Mami (Chief)
- Gundam series
  - Kidō Senshi Gundam (Captain Gadem (episode 3))
  - Kidō Senshi Gundam ZZ (Leader, Neo Shion Soldier)
- Idol Densetsu Eriko (Kenzō Hirata)
- Jungle Kurobē (Pao Pao)
- Kinnikuman (Brocken Junior, Yosaku-san, Franky, Brockenman, Duke Kamata, Wild Bakuto)
- Mashin Eiyuuden Wataru (Touch Down)
- Mirai Shōnen Conan (Kuzō)
- Nils no Fushigi na Tabi (Ondori, Swan King)
- Nintama Rantarō (Tetsumaru Kinoshita, Kamisuki Sennin)
- Osomatsu-kun (1988 version) (Tō-san, Beshi)
- R.O.D the TV (Old Man)
- Slayers Evolution-R (Hunter)
- Soreike! Anpanman (Tekkotsu Hollerman Blue)

=== OVA ===
- Ginga Eiyū Densetsu (xxxx) (Bronze)
- Konpeki no Kantai (xxxx) (Naohiko Kumagai)
- Osomatsu-kun: Iyami Hahitori Kaze no Naka (1990) (Tō-san, Beshi)
- Osomatsu-kun: Suika no Hoshi Karakonnichiha-zanzu! ((1989) Tō-san, Beshi)
- Ozanari Dungeon: Kaze no Tō (xxxx) (Foron)
- Warau Hyōteki (xxxx) (Villager)

=== Theatrical animation ===
- Kaibutsu-kun: Kaibutsu Land he no Shōtai (xxxx) (Gorilla King)
- Kaze no Tani no Nausicaä (xxxx) (Command)
- Kidō Senshi Gundam (xxxx) (Gadem, Amuro Confederation Soldier, Old Refugee)
- Kinnikuman series (xxxx-xx) (Brocken Junior, Yosaku-san)
- Ninja Hattori-kun + Paaman: Chōnōryoku Wars (xxxx) (Person)
- Xabungle Graffiti (xxxx) (Giro Bull)

=== Video games ===
- Shinobi (2002) (Hakuraku)
- Namco × Capcom (2005) (Hideo Shimazu, Grandmaster Meio)

unknown date

- Gundam series
  - Kidō Senshi Gundam: Giren no Yabō series (Gadem)
  - Kidō Senshi Gundam: Meguriai Uchū (Gadem)
  - Kidō Senshi Gundam: Perfect One-Year War (Gadem, Masshu, Baromu)
  - Kidō Senshi Gundam Senki: Lost War Chronicles (Gadem)
  - SD Gundam: G Generation-F (Gadem)
- Mirai Shōnen Conan (PC Engine version) (Garu)
- Justice Gakuen series
  - Moero! Justice Gakuen (Hideo Shimazu)
  - Shiritsu Justice Gakuen: Legion of Heroes (Hideo Shimazu, Tiffany's Papa, Kimura)
  - Shiritsu Justice Gakuen: Nekketsu Seishun Nikki 2 (Hideo Shimazu)
- Summon Night (Weasel)

=== Dubbing ===
- A Bridge Too Far (Nippon TV edition) (Soldier)
- The Dirty Dozen (Major General Worden)
- Major League (Nippon TV edition) (Charlie Donovan)
- The Smurfs (Papa Smurf)
- Thunderbirds
- Ultra 6 Roku Kyōdai vs. Kaijū Gundan (Butsuzō Thief Leader)

=== Tokusatsu ===
- Kyōryū Sentai Koseidon (Sōkan Zaji (voice))
- Mirai Sentai Timeranger (Gambler Velito (voice))
- Robot Keiji (Long armed man (voice), Insight power man (voice))
- Ultraman 80 (Space Ninja Alien Baltan (Godaime) (voice))

=== Other ===
- Kidō Senshi Gundam 0079 Card Builder (Gadem)
- Pachisuro Kinnikuman (Brocken Junior, Yosaku-san)
