= Kazuhiko Kishino =

Japanese voice actor (1934–2020)

- 岸野一彦
- Born: February 14, 1934; Tokushima Prefecture
- Died: February 22, 2020 (aged 86)
- Occupation: Voice actor

Kazuhiko Kishino (岸野一彦, Kishino Kazuhiko; February 14, 1934 – February 22, 2020) was a Japanese actor and voice actor who was represented by Tokyo Actor's Consumer's Cooperative Society. He was a graduate of Doshisha University and resided in Osaka Prefecture. He died of acute heart failure on February 22, 2020.

As a voice actor, he was most recognized for his work in the anime series Kinnikuman as Mayumi Kinniku, Neptuneman and several others.

== Notable voice work ==
=== Animated television series ===
- Gun X Sword (Gadved)
- After War Gundam X (Seidel Rasso)
- Mobile Suit V Gundam (Lob Olesches)
- Kinnikuman (Mayumi Kinniku, Neptuneman, Atlantis, Junkman, Canadianman (eps 68 & 70) etc.)
- Future GPX Cyber Formula (Kojirou Sugo)
- The Brave Fighter of Legend Da-Garn (Kouichirou Takasugi, Gakusha Robot)
- Ginga: Nagareboshi Gin (Musashi)
- PaRappa The Rapper (Doberman)
- Nintama Rantarou (Kingo's Father, Amanatsu Toukurou)
- Burst Angel (Kashocho)
- Phoenix (Karō)
- Full Metal Panic! (Jerome Borda)
- Yawara! A Fashionable Judo Girl (Editor in Chief)
- Record of Lodoss War (Greevus)
- Code Geass (Genbu Kururugi)
- Waka kusa Monogatari (Burns)

=== OVA ===
- Mobile Suit Gundam 0083: Stardust Memory (Ivan Pasarov)
- Armor Hunter Mellowlink (Ganard)

=== Movies ===
- The Heroic Legend of Arslan (Karikara II)
- Mobile Suit Gundam (Lt. Reed)
- Doraemon: Nobita and the Kingdom of Clouds (Resentative)
- Doraemon: Nobita and the Tin Labyrinth (Professor)
- Doraemon: Nobita's Diary of the Creation of the World (Driver)
- Kinnikuman Series (Mayumi Kinniku)
- Mobile Suit Gundam 0083: The Last Blitz of Zeon (Ivan Pasarav)
- Pom Poko (Policeman)

=== Tokusatsu ===
- Metal Hero Series

- Choujinki Metalder
- Kidou Keiji Jiban
- Tokkei Winspector (1990, 49 episodes) - Madocks (voice)
- Special Rescue Exceedraft (1992, Episode 16) - Duke

- Super Sentai Series

- Himitsu Sentai Gorenger (1975) - Sakui / Murayama
- Taiyo Sentai Sun Vulcan (1981, Episode: 41) - Reporter
- Dai Sentai Goggle V (1982, Episode: 19) - Hachi Mozoo (voice)
- Dengeki Sentai Changeman (1985-1986) - Marzo / Haust / Ballas / Seala / Girom / Zoll Bass / Kahge / Zados / Jigura / Daryl (voice)
- Choujuu Sentai Liveman (1988) - Ikari Zuno / Ken Zuno / Toumei Zuno / Hacker Zuno (voice)
- Kousoku Sentai Turboranger (1989) - Yashiki Boma / Kobu Boma / Kaseki Boma / Fujimi Boma / Gunman Boma (voice)
- Chikyuu Sentai Fiveman (1990) - Gagargin / Liogin / WaniKaerugin / HyouCobrarugin (voice)
- Choujin Sentai Jetman (1991, Episode: 39) - Sniper Cat (voice)
- Kyōryū Sentai Zyuranger (1992) - Dora Minotaur / Dokiita Clay Golems / Dora Cockatrice / Dora Endos / Dora Silkis (voice)
- Ninja Sentai Kakuranger (1994, Episode: 12) - Tengu (voice)
- Denji Sentai Megaranger (1997, Episode: 35) - Mantis Nejilar (voice)
- Kyuukyuu Sentai GoGo-V (1999, Episode: 25) - Ceremonal Psyma Beast Halleluyan (voice)
- Hyakujuu Sentai GaoRanger (2001, Episode: 35) - Blacksmith Org (voice)
- Tokusou Sentai Dekaranger (2004, 8 episodes) - Supreme Commander Horusian Numa-O (voice)

- Kamen Rider Series

- Kamen Rider Black (1988) - Earwig Mutant / Coelacanth Mutant (voice)
- Kamen Rider Black RX (1988-1989) - Strange Demon Robot Cublican / Strange Demon Beast-Man Gaingamoth / Strange Demon Supernatural Clan Zunojin / Strange Demon Robot Tripron 2 / Strange Alien Lifeforms Antront / Strange Demon Beast-Man Gynagingam / Strange Demon Robot Elgitron / Strange Demon Robot Shuraigin / Strongest Inhumanoid Gran Zairus / Riderman / Kamen Rider Super-1 (voice)

=== Dubbing ===
- Timecop (Senator Aaron McComb (Ron Silver))
