= Kōji Yada =

Japanese actor, voice actor and narrator

- 矢田 耕司
- Born: Hiroji Yada (矢田 弘二); April 15, 1933; Tokyo Prefecture, Japan
- Died: May 1, 2014 (aged 81); Tokyo, Japan
- Occupations: Actor; voice actor; narrator
- Agent: Aoni Production
- Height: 165 cm (5 ft 5 in)

Kōji Yada (矢田 耕司, Yada Kōji; April 15, 1933 - May 1, 2014) was a Japanese actor, voice actor and narrator who was represented by Aoni Production. He died in Tokyo due to chronic kidney disease on May 1, 2014.

== Notable voice roles ==
=== Anime television series ===
- Star of the Giants (1969) (Jirō Masuda, Tsuneo Horiuchi)
- Andersen Stories (1971) (Elen's Grandfather)
- Getter Robo (1974) (Monji Ogarashi, Daizo Jin, Daimajin Yura)
- Maeterlinck's Blue Bird: Tyltyl and Mytyl's Adventurous Journey (1980) (Tyltyl and Mytyl's Father, Spirit of the Time)
- Fist of the North Star (1984) (Colonel, Hidora)
- Yume Senshi Wingman (1984) (Kenta's Father)
- Ginga: Nagareboshi Gin (1986) (Sniper, Daisuke's Father)
- City Hunter '91 (1991) (Boss)
- High School Mystery: Gakuen Nanafushigi (1991) (Shinichi Tajima)
- Dragon Ball Z (1992) (Android #20/Dr. Gero)
- 21 Emon (1992) (Orino Masakazu)
- A Dog of Flanders: My Patrasche (1992) (Bowman)
- Aoki Densetsu Shoot! (1994) (Coach Matoba)
- Dr. Slump (Remake) (1998) (Tsuruten)
- Trouble Chocolate (1999) (Tetsusaburo Omori)
- Crash B-Daman (2006) (Saionji Kurando)

Unknown date

- Angel Heart (Chin)
- Arrow Emblem Hawk of the Grand Prix (Narrator)
- Bakuhatsu Goro (Onimaru)
- Digimon Xros Wars (Deckerdramon)
- Dragon Ball Z Kai (Dr. Gero)
- Detective Conan: Magic Kaito Special (Konosuke Jii)
- Dragon Ball GT (Dr. Gero)
- GeGeGe no Kitarou 2nd Series (Konaki Jijii)
- Getter Robo G (Professor Grah, Iron Armor Mask)
- Hello! Lady Lynn (Headmaster)
- Hanbun no Tsuki ga Noboru Sora (Yoshizou Tada)
- High School Mystery: Gakuen Nanafushigi (Shinichi Tajima)
- Jungle Kurobe (Shishi-otoko's Papa)
- Lupin III Part III (Bruce)
- Mazinger Z (Narrator, Professor Morimori, Pigman, Iron Mask)
- Monster (Achmed Mustafa)
- One Piece (Zeff, Raoul, Impel Down warden [Strong World Episode 0])
- Rocky Chuck the Mountain Rat (Bob the Quail)
- Saint Seiya (Libra Dohko (Roshi))
- Space Battleship Yamato Series (General Talon)
- Time Patrol Rescueman (Sandoitchi)

=== OVA ===
- Garou Densetsu/Fatal Fury (xxxx) (Tung Fu Rue)
- Legend of the Galactic Heroes (xxxx) (Sebastion von Musel)
- Saint Seiya Hades Chapter (xxxx) (Roshi)

=== Movies ===
- Dragon Ball Z: Extreme Battle! The Three Great Super Saiyajin (1992) (Dr. Gero)
- Dragon Ball Z: The Strongest in the World (1990) (Dr. Kochin)
- Farewell Space Battleship Yamato (xxxx) (General Talon)
- Fist of the North Star (xxxx) (Colonel)
- Kinnikuman Movies (xxxx):
- Kinnikuman: Stolen Championship Belt (xxxx) (Mouko-Seijin)
- Counterattack! The Underground Space Choujins (xxxx) (Hydra Būton)
- Great Riot! Justice Superman (xxxx) (Black Great Ukon)
- Hour of Triumph! Justice Superman (xxxx) (The Nio)
- Justice Superman vs. Ancient Superman (xxxx) (Gun Satan)
- Mazinger Z vs. Devilman (1972) (Professor Nossori)

=== Games ===
- Dragon Ball Z 2: Super Battle (1995) (Dr. Gero / Android 20)
- Dead or Alive (1996) (Raidou)
- JoJo's Bizarre Adventure: Phantom Blood (2006) (Dario Brando)
- Klonoa (2008) (Grandpa)
- Yakuza 4 (2010) (Yoshiharu Ueno)
- Kid Icarus: Uprising (2012) (Dyntos)

unknown date

- BS Fire Emblem: Akaneia Senki (xxxx) (Boah, Dice, Brzak)
- BS Zelda no Densetsu Inishie no Sekiban (xxxx) (Ajina)
- Dragon Ball Z Series (xxxx-xx) (Dr. Gero)
- Dragon Ball Z Sparking! (xxxx) Series (Dr. Gero)
- R's Study (Rの書斎, R no Shosai) (xxxx) (Owner of the Inn, Photo Shop, Mr. Mamoru Mori, Muramoto, Father T.)
- Space Battleship Yamato Series (xxxx-xx) (General Talon)
- Super Robot Wars Series (xxxx-xx) (Kevin Oruto)
- Tokimeki Memorial Girl's Side: 2nd Kiss (xxxx-xx) (Souichirou Saeki)

=== Tokusatsu ===
- Akumaizer 3 (xxxx) (voice of Evil)
- Choujin Bibyun (xxxx) (voice of Evil)
- Ganbare!! Robocon (xxxx) (voice of Robopar and Robo Mecha)
- Robot Detective (xxxx) (voice of Seven man, Spring man, and Gear man)
- Sliver Mask (xxxx) (voice of Alien Shine)
- Ultraman (1966) (voice of Underground People X)
- Ultra Seven (1967) (voice of Alien Cool, Alien Iyros, AlienPoll, and Alien Goron)

=== Dubbing ===
- Battle of the Commandos (1975 NTV edition) (Pvt. Sam Schrier (Helmuth Schneider))
- Watership Down (Dandelion)
