= Yasuo Tanaka (voice actor) =

Japanese voice actor (1932–2003)

Yasuo Tanaka 田中康郎
- Born: March 6, 1932; Tokyo, Empire of Japan
- Died: December 5, 2003 (aged 71)
- Occupation: Voice actor
- Years active: 1972–2003
- Agent: Kyu Production

Yasuo Tanaka (田中 康郎, Tanaka Yasuo; March 6, 1932 – December 5, 2003) was a Japanese voice actor born in Tokyo.

His name is sometimes misread as Yasurō Tanaka.

== Filmography ==
=== Television animation ===
- Android Kikaider (1972) (Gray Rhino King), and (Blue Buffalo)
- Galaxy Express 999 (1979) (Maetel's father, Mayor, Policeman A)
- GeGeGe no Kitarō (1985) (Miagenyuudou, Tantanbou, Uruta, Akane's father, Kamanari, Sakanaya, Nobiagari, Werewolf, Daruma doll, Gasahdokuro, Thief)
- Dragon Ball (1986) (Bacterian, Kinkaku)
- Dragon Ball Z (1990) (Zaacro)
- Street Fighter II V (1995) (Zangief)
- Rurouni Kenshin (1996) (Onisaki Tekkan)

Unknown date

- Akuma-kun (Cerberus)
- Space Battleship Yamato III (Professor Simon)
- Science Ninja Team Gatchaman (Captain, Captain Shirei)
- Crayon Shin-chan (Wameo Miki)
- Kiteretsu Daihyakka (Buta Gorilla's Uncle)
- Love Me, My Knight (Doctor, Chief Senden)
- Time Bokan (Dracula, Drenson, Professor Griffen)
- Yatterman (Elder, Donpan)
- Space Runaway Ideon (Rice)
- High School! Kimengumi
- Fist of the North Star (Mad General, Gojiba, Haystack, Zacol, Gonz, Morgan)
- Fist of the North Star 2 (Barona, Bron)
- Yume Senshi Wingman (Rimel)
- Lupin the 3rd Part III (Laselle)

=== Original video animation ===
- Legend of the Galactic Heroes (1991) (Airanz)

=== Animated films ===
- Doraemon: Nobita and the Haunts of Evil (1982) (Village headman)
- Doraemon: Nobita and the Steel Troops (1986) (Robot Squad Leader)
- Ultraman USA (1989) (Professor Filbee)

=== Video game ===
- Tengai Makyou: Ziria (1989)

=== Japanese dub ===
- The Blues Brothers (1983 Fuji TV edition) (Curtis (Cab Calloway))
- Dracula (1982 TV Asahi edition) (Milo Renfield (Tony Haygarth))
- Live and Let Die (1981 and 1988 TBS editions) (Tee Hee Johnson (Julius Harris))
- The Muppet Show (Sweetums)
