= Minori Matsushima =

Japanese actress (1940–2022)

- 松島 みのり
- Born: December 1, 1940; Funabashi, Japan
- Died: April 8, 2022 (aged 81)
- Occupations: Actress; voice actress; narrator
- Years active: 1963–2022
- Agent: Aoni Production

Minori Matsushima (Japanese: 松島 みのり, Hepburn: Matsushima Minori; December 1, 1940 – April 8, 2022) was a Japanese actress, voice actress and narrator who was affiliated with Aoni Production.

She was most known for her voice acting roles as Candice White Adley in Candy Candy, Hiyoko Isu in The Song of Tentomushi, Alexandria Meat in Kinnikuman, Sayaka Yumi in Mazinger Z, Hiroshi Ichikawa in Kaibutsu-kun, the titular character in Dororo, and Gyopi in Goldfish Warning!.

== Biography ==
Matsushima was born in Chiba Prefecture on December 1, 1940.

=== Death ===
Matsushima died from pancreatic cancer on April 8, 2022, at the age of 81.

== Filmography ==
=== Television animation ===
- Kaoru Mizushima in Super Jetter (1965)
- Sayaka Yumi in Mazinger Z (1973)
- Ayumi Himekawa in Glass Mask (1984 TV series)
- Candice "Candy" White in Candy Candy (1976–79)
- Yoko Asai in Harris no Kaze
- Meat Alexandria, Silver Mask in Kinnikuman
- Peach in Fumoon (1980) - Television film
- Child C in Galaxy Express 999: Can You Love Like a Mother!! (1980) - Television special
- Clotilde Destange in Lupin tai Holmes (1981) - Television special
- Elizabeth Frankenstein in Kyōfu Densetsu: Kaiki! Frankenstein (1982) - Television special
- Atsumorisou, Kingfisher in Poppen-sensei to Kaerazu no Numa (1982) - Television special
- Meat-kun as Kinnikuman: Kessen! Shichinin no Seigi Chōjin vs. Uchū Nobushi (1984) - Television special
- Gyopi in Goldfish Warning!
- Ugly Duckling and Rudy in Andersen Stories
- Dororo in Dororo
- Sachiko in Dokaben
- Hiroshi in Kaibutsu-kun
- Honey Honey in Honey Honey
- Shao-Mai in Tatakae!! Ramenman
- Hiyoko Ishuu in The Song of Tentomushi
- Akane in Akane-chan
- Temari in Ranma ½
- Kyoko's Mother in Maison Ikkoku
- Mama in 21 Emon
- Lucy May in Lucy of the Southern Rainbow
- Bun Bun in Hoero Bun Bun
- JR in Konpora Kid
- Little Lulu in Little Lulu and Her Little Friends (episodes 4-26)
- Fukiko-san in Fushigi Mahou Fan Fan Pharmacy
- Ricky Kentle in Hello! Sandybell
- Kuro in Bemubemu Hunter Kotengumaru
- Youko in Kick no Oni
- Elis in Little Pollon
- Vice Admiral Tsuru in One Piece

=== Animated films ===
- Misuke in Misuke in the Land of Ice (1970)
- Jim Hawkins in Animal Treasure Island (1971)
- Jack in Maken Liner-0011 Henshin Seyo! (1972)
- Sayaka Yumi in Mazinger Z Vs. Devilman (1973)
- Hikaru Makiba in Uchu Enban Daisenso (1975)
- Baby Chirin in Ringing Bell (1978)
- Candice "Candy" White in Candy Candy: Haru no Yobigoe (1978)
- Candice "Candy" White in Candy Candy: Candy no Natsu Yasumi (1978)
- Chiko in Unico: Black Cloud, White Feather (1979)
- Matsumiya Toshiko in Mahō Shōjo Lalabel: Umi ga Yobu Natsuyatsumi (1980)
- Ree in The Sea Prince and the Fire Child (1981)
- Himiko in Queen Millennia (1982)
- Aesop's Mother in Manga Aesop Monogatari (1983)
- Meat-kun in Kinnikuman: Ubawareta Chanpion Beruto (1984)
- Meat Alexandria as Kinnikuman: Ōabare! Seigi Chōjin (1984)
- Meat-kun as Kinnikuman: Seigi Chōjin vs Kodai Chōjin (1985)
- Meat-kun as Kinnikuman: Gyakushū! Uchū Kakure Chōjin (1985)
- Meat-kun as Kinnikuman: Haresugata! Seigi Chōjin (1985)
- Meat-kun as Kinnikuman: New York Kikiippatsu! (1986)
- Meat-kun as Kinnikuman: Seigi Chōjin vs Senshi Chōjin (1986)
- Shao-Mai as Tatakae!! Ramenman (1988)
- Mikujin in Doraemon: Nobita's Dorabian Nights (1991)
- Mama as 21 Emon: Uchū Ike! Hadashi no Princess (1992)
- Candice "Candy" White in Candy Candy Movie (1992)
- Sho's Mother in Katta-kun Monogatari (1995)
- Mama as Crayon Shin-chan: Blitzkrieg! Pig's Hoof's Secret Mission (1998)
- Tsuru as One Piece Film: Z (2012)
- Train Announcer in Mazinger Z: Infinity (2018)

=== Tokusatsu ===
- Empress Hysteria (eps. 1 - 4, 6 - 14, 16, 20 - 21, 23, 26 - 27, 29 - 31, 33 - 41)/Dowager Empress Hysteria (ep. 41, 47 - 48) in Choriki Sentai Ohranger (1995)
- Empress Hysteria in Choriki Sentai Ohranger the Movie

=== Non-anime roles ===
- Penny Robinson in Lost in Space
- Uhura in Star Trek
- Mom Unit in Whatever Happened to Robot Jones?
