= Sanji Hase =

Japanese actor (1936–2002)

- はせ さん治
- Born: Hirō Hase (長谷 弘夫); January 2, 1936; Yodobashi Ward, Tokyo City, Tokyo Prefecture, Japan
- Died: March 8, 2002 (aged 66); Toshima Ward, Tokyo, Japan
- Other name: San-chan (サンちゃん)
- Occupations: Actor; voice actor
- Years active: 1950–2002
- Spouse: Taeko Hase
- Children: Arihiro Hase (died 1996)

Hirō Hase (長谷 弘夫, Hase Hirō; January 2, 1936 – March 8, 2002), better known professionally by the stage name Sanji Hase (はせ さん治, Hase Sanji), was a Japanese voice actor and the father of Macross star Arihiro Hase.

He is most well known for providing the voice of "Aderans" Nakano-san in Kinnikuman.

== Death ==
Hase died of lung cancer on March 8, 2002, at the age of 66. At the time of his death he was a free agent, but he had been previously represented by Aoni Production.

== Notable voice roles ==
- Majokko Megu-chan (Chō-san)
- Devilman (Rockfell)
- Ikkyū-san (Shūnen)
- GeGeGe no Kitaro 1971 (Konaki Jijii (First voice))
- GeGeGe no Kitaro 1985 (Hakusanbō, Satomi's Father, Mermen Boss, Merman, Hiderigami, Gremlin, Kurabboko, Enra-Enra, others)
- Magne Robo Gakeen (Tensai Tsuji)
- Cyborg 009 1979 (Chang Changku/006)
- Nils no Fushigi na Tabi (Emeric, others)
- Hana no Ko Lunlun (Yabōki)
- Sazae-san (Nanbutsu Isasaka (First Voice)
- Puss 'n Boots Travels Around the World (Killer A)
- Kinnikuman (Kazuo Nakano, Kani Base, Cements, Okamarasu)
- Cutey Honey (Goemon)
- High School! Kimengumi (Kiyoshi's Father)
- Mōretsu Atarō 1990 (Xgorou)
- Yatterman (Zenigata Heiji)
- La Seine no Hoshi (Shuro)
- Rocky Chuck the Mountain Rat (Bobby)
- Akazukin Chacha (Shōnosuke)
- Doraemon (Mr. Honekawa - 1st voice)

== Dubbing ==
- The Black Cauldron as Fflewddur Fflam
- The Bridge on the River Kwai as Baker (Harold Goodwin)
- Lady and the Tramp as Joe
- Pinocchio as Gideon
- Watership Down as Captain Holly
