= Eiji Kanie =

Japanese actor and voice actor

- 蟹江 栄司
- Born: November 21, 1941; Tokyo, Japan
- Died: October 13, 1985 (aged 43); Tokyo, Japan
- Occupations: Actor; voice actor
- Years active: 1971–1985
- Agent: Aoni Production

Eiji Kanie (蟹江 栄司, Kanie Eiji; November 21, 1941 – October 13, 1985) was a Japanese actor and voice actor born in Tokyo. He is most remembered for being the first voice of Ramenman in Kinnikuman and for playing Vrlitwhai Kridanik in Super Dimension Fortress Macross. He died in 1985 of a subarachnoid hemorrhage. After his death, Banjō Ginga replaced him as Ramenman.

Years later, Ryūzaburō Ōtomo would play Vrlitwhai Kridanik in the Macross and Super Robot Wars video games.

== Filmography ==
=== Anime ===
Year	Title	Role	Notes
1980	Space Battleship Yamato III	Gustav	TV Series
1980	Space Runaway Ideon	Gindoro Jinmu	TV Series
1980	The Ultraman	Narrator	TV Series, Voice
1981–1982	Taiyo Sentai Sun Vulcan	Sun Vulcan Robo	Voice
1982	Super Dimension Fortress Macross	Vrlitwhai Kridanik	Voice, 5 episodes
1982	Arcadia of My Youth		Voice
1982–1983	Armored Fleet Dairugger XV	Socrat Tes in Armored Fleet	TV Series, Voice
1983	Kinnikuman	Ramenman	TV Series, 1983–1985
1983–1984	Lightspeed Electroid Albegas	Professor Mizuki / President Azasu	TV Series
1984	Lensman	Narrator	Voice
1984	Super Space Fortress Macross	Vrlitwhai 7018	Voice
1984	Kinnikuman: Ubawareta champion belt	Ramenman	
1984	Kinnikuman: Ôabare! Seigi chôjin	Ramenman	
1985	Kinnikuman: Seigi chôjin VS kodai chôjin	Ramenman	
1985	Dirty Pair	Narrator	TV Series
1984–1987	Fist of the North Star	Zeed / Devil Rebirth / Madara	5 episodes, (final appearance)
