= Yonehiko Kitagawa =

Japanese voice actor (1931–2026)

- 北川 米彦
- Born: Kunihiko Takeda (武田 国彦, Takeda Kunihiko); June 9, 1931; Tokyo, Japan
- Died: March 5, 2026 (aged 94)
- Other names: Kunihiko Kitagawa (北川 国彦, Kitagawa Kunihiko)
- Occupation: Voice actor
- Years active: 1951–2026
- Agent: Aoni Production
- Height: 176 cm (5 ft 9 in)

Yonehiko Kitagawa (北川 米彦, Kitagawa Yonehiko; born Kunihiko Takeda (武田 国彦, Takeda Kunihiko); June 9, 1931 – March 5, 2026) was a Japanese voice actor represented by Aoni Production. He was formerly credited as Kunihiko Kitagawa (北川 国彦, Kitagawa Kunihiko). He was a graduate of Hosei University.

Kitagawa died from pneumonia on March 5, 2026, at the age of 94. A private funeral attended by close family members was held, in accordance with his family's wishes.

== Filmography ==
=== Television animation ===
1966

- Sally the Witch (Mephisto, Dump Driver, Charlatan)

1968

- Akane-chan (Uncle Kusuke)
- GeGeGe no Kitarou 1st Series (Konaki Jijii (ep. 7 only), Akamata)

1969

- Tiger Mask (Michiaki Yoshimura, Master Arashi, Lionman, Red Mask of Death, others)
- Attack No.1 (Headmaster)
- Mōretsu Atarō (Kumagorō Omawari-san)

1971

- GeGeGe no Kitarou 2nd Series (Miage Nyuudou)
- Lupin III 1st Series (Lupin II)

1972

- Umi no Triton (Poseidon, Narrator)
- The One Who Loves Justice: Moonlight Mask (Satan's Claw)
- Mazinger Z (Dr. Nossori)
- Mahōtsukai Chappy

1973

- Doraemon (NTV anime)
- Dororon Enma-kun (Principal Teacher, Yano's Father, others)
- Babel II (Yumiko's Father)
- Little Wansa (Rolf)

1975

- Ikkyū-san

1977

- Lupin III 2nd Series

1981

- Little Women (Laurence)

1983

- Kinnikuman (Chairman Harabote Muscle, The Mountain, Akuma Shogun/Gold Mask, Big the Budou, Canadianman, Oilman)

1990

- Magical Taruruto-kun (Harako's Butler)

1991

- Goldfish Warning! (Chairman)

1996

- GeGeGe no Kitarou 4th Series (Miage Nyuudou, Masumoto, Ojii-san)

1998

- Kare Kano (Hiroyuki's Grandfather)

1999

- Pocket Monsters (Shimajio)
- Bomberman B-Daman Bakugaiden V (Senninbon)

2002

- Azumanga Daioh (Dr. Ishihara)
- GetBackers (Visconti)

2011

- Bunny Drop (Makio)

2014

- Mushihi (Grandfather of the Medicine Bag)

=== OVA ===
1989

- Legend of the Galactic Heroes (Al Salem)

=== Tokusatsu ===
- Moonlight Mask (Nishikawa/Skeleton Mask)
- Robot Detective (Locker man, Torpedo man)

=== Dubbing ===
- Bullitt (1977 TV Asahi edition) (Weissberg (Robert Duvall))
- Sabrina (Thomas Fairchild (John Wood))
