= Nana Yamaguchi =

Japanese actress and voice actress

- 山口奈々
- Born: August 10, 1938 (age 88); Tokyo City, Tokyo Prefecture, Empire of Japan
- Occupations: Actress; voice actress
- Years active: 1963–present
- Agent: Aoni Production

Nana Yamaguchi (山口奈々, Yamaguchi Nana; born August 10, 1938 in Tokyo) is a Japanese actress and voice actress represented by Aoni Production. Some of her major roles are Sally's mom and Sumire in the original Sally the Witch series, Furu-Furu in Majokko Megu-chan, and Queen Sayuri Kinniku in Kinnikuman.

== Filmography ==
=== Anime ===
Year	Series	Role	Notes	Source
1966	Sally the Witch	Sally's Mom, Sumire		
1968	Ge Ge Ge no Kitaro	Neko Musume		
1973	Babel II			
1974	Majokko Megu-chan	Mama, Furu-Furu		
1974	Great Mazinger	Kaori's Mother		
1976	Candy Candy	Sister Lane, Mrs. Leagan, Sister Gray		
1978	Space Pirate Captain Harlock	Shizuka Namino		
1978	Starzinger	Queen Rasetsu		
1978	Galaxy Express 999	Mother		
1981	Little Women's Four Sisters	Hannah		
1981	Fang of the Sun Dougram	Fina Kashim		
1983	Armored Trooper Votoms	Sophie		
1983–86	Kinnikuman	Queen Sayuri Kinniku, Nakano Kimiko, Kazubou, Ashuraman's Mother, Kinniku Mayumi (young), Edith Harrison		
1984	Tongari Bōshi no Memoru	Penelope		
1994	Marmalade Boy	Vice Principal		
1994	Ghost Sweeper Mikami	Rokudou Meiko's mother	Ep. 25	
1995	Romeo's Blue Skies	Countess Isabella Montovani		
1996	Shamanic Princess	Adept A		
1999	Shin Bikkuriman	Nadia Seishin		
2000	Daa! Daa! Daa!	Nanami's mother		
2002	Atashinchi	Misumi		

=== Tokusatsu ===
Year	Series	Role	Notes	Source
1975	Akumaizer 3	Majoruca (ep. 9 - 10), Yuki-onna (ep. 21), KItsunern (ep. 33)	Ep. 9 - 10, 21, 33	
1999	Ultraman Gaia: The Battle in Hyperspace	Red Sphere	Movie	
