= Masashi Hirose =

Japanese voice actor (born 1947)

- 広瀬 正志
- Born: November 6, 1947 (age 78); Osaka Prefecture, Japan
- Occupation: Voice actor
- Years active: 1970–present

Masashi Hirose (広瀬 正志, Hirose Masashi; born November 6, 1947) is a Japanese voice actor from Osaka Prefecture, Japan. He works at Production Baobab.

He is known for the roles of Ramba Ral (Mobile Suit Gundam), Rikishiman (Kinnikuman), Gosterro (Blue Comet SPT Layzner) and Nakano-sensei (Lovely Complex).

In September 2014, Hirose was hospitalized for an unspecified illness. As a result, he was replaced by Katsuhisa Hōki in Gundam Build Fighters Try, Banjō Ginga in One Piece, and Akio Ōtsuka in In Search of the Lost Future.

== Filmography ==
=== Anime television ===
- Lupin the 3rd Part II (Herbert von Myer, others) (1977)
- Mobile Suit Gundam (Ramba Ral) (1979)
- Astro Boy (Pannakokku) (1980-1981)
- Fang of the Sun Dougram (Destan) (1983)
- Armored Trooper Votoms (Kan Yu) (1983)
- Blue Comet SPT Layzner (Gosterro) (1985-1986)
- Fist of the North Star (Golem, Kubaru, Search Captain, Zack) (1985-1986)
- Machine Robo: Revenge of Cronos (Gillman) (1986)
- City Hunter (Inagaki, Kameda, Scout #2, Gilmore, Serrano) (1987-1990)
- Osomatsu-kun (Sandayu) (1988)
- Mashin Eiyuuden Wataru 2 (Jangorilla, Mentenanman) (1990-1991)
- Mahoujin Guru Guru (Hatenashi Village Elder) (1995)
- New Mobile Report Gundam Wing (Master O) (1995-1996)
- After War Gundam X (Katokk Alzamille) (1996)
- Detective Conan (Ogura, Ushikubo, Werewolf, Misc. male voices) (1996-2012)
- Kindaichi Case Files (Goro, Masayuki Ishii, Shuuichirou Aizawa) (1997)
- Lost Universe (Alzas) (1998)
- Kyo Kara Maoh! (Baxter) (1998)
- Gregory Horror Show (Death) (1999)
- One Piece (Riku Dold III) (1999)
- Cowboy Bebop (Fad) (1999)
- Dai-Guard (Chief Haruo Osugi) (1999-2000)
- Pokémon (Gantetsu) (2000)
- Ghost Stories (Akaikami Aoikami) (2000-2001)
- Vandread (Kümmel Ohzeki) (2001)
- InuYasha (Monk) (2001)
- Mobile Fighter G Gundam (Shawn Douglas) (2002)
- Mobile Suit Gundam Seed (Sahib Ashman) (2002-2003)
- Mermaid Forest (Leader of the Sakagami Pirates) (2003)
- Ashita no Nadja (Watson) (2003-2004)
- Daphne in the Brilliant Blue (Nakamura) (2004)
- Phoenix (Lamp) (2004)
- Rockman.EXE Axess (Tensuke Takumi) (2004)
- Paranoia Agent (Akihiro Takamine) (2004)
- Monster (Cole) (2004-2005)
- Bleach (Abûero) (2004-2005)
- Keroro Gunso (Animation Director, Prof Hellsing) (2004-2007)
- Samurai Champloo (Kuroihara) (2005)
- Futakoi Alternative (Kumicho) (2005)
- Speed Grapher (Seijirou Togotsu) (2005)
- Jigoku Shōjo (Ryuuzo Kusuno) (2005)
- Hell Girl (Mayor Ryouzo Kusunoki) (2006)
- Witchblade (Muraki) (2006)
- 009-1 (Secretary) (2006)
- Honey and Clover (Professor Tange) (2006)
- Gintama (Kanbee) (2007)
- Oh! Edo Rocket (Heihachiro Oshio) (2007)
- Toward the Terra (Shiroe's Papa) (2007)
- Lovely Complex (Nakano-sensei) (2007)
- Umineko no Naku Koro ni (Hideyoshi Ushiromiya) (2009)
- Ushinawareta Mirai o Motomete (Sakunoshin Honjou); changed to Akio Ōtsuka (2009)
- Fairy Tail (Hades) (2009-2014)
- Fate/zero (Risei Kotomine) (2011-2012)
- Zetman (Seizou Amagi) (2012)
- Gundam Build Fighters (Mr. Ral) (2013)
- Gundam Build Fighters Try (Mr. Ral) (eps. 1–4) (2014)
- Onegai My Melody (George Hijikata) (?)
- Zipang (Samuel D. Hatton) (?)
- Yu-Gi-Oh! Zexal II (Vector's father) (?)

=== Original Video Animations ===
- Armored Trooper Votoms: Big Battle (Radah Neeva) (1986)
- Gunbuster (Admiral Yuzo Takaya) (1988)
- Legend of the Galactic Heroes (1989) (Arthur Lynch)
- Mobile Suit Gundam: The 08th MS Team (1996) (Baresto Rosita)
- The Silent Service (Keisuke Hamamoto, Aleksei) (1997–1998)
- Getter Robo Armageddon (Stinger) (1998)
- Hellsing Ultimate (Sir Penwood) (2008)
- Kenichi: The Mightiest Disciple (James Shiba) (2012–2014)

=== Anime films ===
- Mobile Suit Gundam (1981) (Ramba Ral)
- Mobile Suit Gundam: Soldiers of Sorrow (1981) (Ramba Ral)
- Mobile Suit Gundam: Encounters in Space (1982) (Ramba Ral)
- Kinnikuman film series (Rikishiman, The Ninja, Kendaman, others) (1984–1986)
- My Neighbor Totoro (1988) (Kanta's Father)
- Mobile Suit Gundam: The 08th MS Team, Miller's Report (Jacob) (1998)
- Doraemon: Nobita and the Legend of the Sun King (2000) (Coretol)

=== Tokusatsu ===
- Ultraman Zoffy: Ultra Warriors vs. the Giant Monster Army (1984) (Alien Temperor, Alien Baltan II)
- Garo Special: Byakuya no Maju (2006) (Horror Legules)

=== Video games ===
- Mobile Suit Gundam (Ramba Ral) (1981)
- Armored Trooper Votoms: Udo Kumen Arc (Kan Yu) (1983)
- Mobile Suit Gundam: Gihren's Greed (Ramba Ral) (1998)
- Ikusagami (2005) (Takeda Shingen)
- Radiata Stories (Dynas Stone) (2005)
- Yoake Mae yori Ruri Iro na (Lioness Teo Arshlight) (2006)
- Dragon Quest Swords: The Masked Queen and the Tower of Mirrors (Minister of Alsword) (2007)
- ASH: Archaic Sealed Heat (King Sumnelthia III) (2007)
- Infinite Undiscovery (Enma) (2008)
- Super Robot Wars series (Ramba Ral, Gosterro, Kan Yu, Dr. Stinger) (2008–2019)
- Fallout: New Vegas (Robert House) (2010)
- Professor Layton vs. Ace Attorney (Story Teller) (2012)
- Tales of Vesperia (Barbos, Leblanc) (2019)

=== Dubbing ===
Original year	Dub year	Title	Role	Original actor	Notes	Ref
1959	2012	Some Like It Hot	"Spats" Colombo	George Raft		
1982	1987	Tootsie	Jeff Slater	Bill Murray	Fuji TV edition	
1986		Sledge Hammer!	Narrator			
1987		The Running Man	William Laughlin	Yaphet Kotto		
1987		The Transformers: Rebirth	Searchlight, Scourge			
1990–2020		The Simpsons	Apu Nahasapeemapetilon, Sideshow Mel			
1993	1996	Last Action Hero	The Ripper	Tom Noonan		
1995	1997	The Quick and the Dead	'Dog' Kelly	Tobin Bell		
1998		The Big Lebowski	Malibu police chief	Leon Russom		
1998		Hard Rain	Sheriff Mike Collins	Randy Quaid		
1999–2002		Courage the Cowardly Dog	Bobby Ganoush			
2000		Power Rangers Lightspeed Rescue	Captain Michell	Ron Rogge		
2001–2004		Evil Con Carne	Hector Con Carne	Phil LaMarr		
2003		Master and Commander: The Far Side of the World	Awkward Davies	Patrick Gallagher		
2008		The Fifth Commandment	Max "Coolbreeze" Templeton	Keith David		
2012		The Avengers	Interviewee	Stan Lee		
2013		Thor: The Dark World	Psychiatric patient	Stan Lee		
2014		Agents of S.H.I.E.L.D.	Debonair gentleman	Stan Lee		
2014		Captain America: The Winter Soldier	Museum security guard	Stan Lee		
2014		Guardians of the Galaxy	Old man	Stan Lee		

=== Other voices ===
- Star Tours – The Adventures Continue (Boba Fett)
