= Kōji Totani =

Japanese voice actor (1948–2006)

- 戸谷 公次
- Born: July 12, 1948; Nagoya, Aichi Prefecture, Japan
- Died: February 6, 2006 (aged 57)
- Education: Tokai University
- Occupations: Actor; voice actor; narrator
- Years active: 1974–2006
- Agent: Aoni Production
- Notable work: Fist of the North Star as Jagi; Dr. Slump as Kurikinton; Kinnikuman as Detective Gobugari and Announcer; Saint Seiya as Capricorn Shura; Mobile Suit Gundam 0083: Stardust Memory as Alpha A. Bate
- Children: Kimito Totani

Kōji Totani (戸谷 公次, Totani Kōji; July 12, 1948 – February 6, 2006) was a Japanese actor, voice actor and narrator from Nagoya, Aichi Prefecture, Japan affiliated with Aoni Production.

== Death ==
On February 6, 2006, he died from acute heart failure at the age of 57. His final appearance was the Naruto 2006 New Year one-hour special, where he voiced Hoki. Following Totani's death, his ongoing roles were taken up by other voice actors.

== Filmography ==
=== Anime television ===
1979

- Mobile Suit Gundam (Uragan, Cozun Graham)

1984

- Fist of the North Star (Club, Fox, Baron, Jagi, Shikaba, Young Ryuuken, Ren, Han, Zebra)

1987

- Dragon Ball (Draculaman)

1990

- Dragon Ball Z (Kiwi)

1996

- Dragon Ball GT (Don Kiar)

Unknown date

- Air (Minagi's father)
- The Brave Fighter of Sun Fighbird (Guard Wing and Super Guardion)
- Brave Police J-Decker (Kuze)
- Mobile Suit Zeta Gundam (Kacricon Cacooler, Gady Kinzei)
- Mobile Suit Gundam ZZ (Gottn Goh, August Gidan)
- Galaxy Express 999 (Locomotive, others)
- Ginga: Nagareboshi Gin (Akatora)
- Kikou Kantai Dairugger XV (Teles)
- Kinnikuman (Detective Gobugari(Aikawa), Announcer, Pentagon, Big Magnum, Ebio/Tendorn, Eragines, Kakehu, Kappatron, Mr Kamen, others)
- Cyborg 009 1979 (Pyunma/008)
- Sakigake!! Otokojuku (Umanosuke Gonda, Henshouki)
- Samurai Champloo (Shige)
- Juushin Liger (Doll Neibee)
- Heavy Metal L-Gaim (Hasha Moja, Bara)
- Aura Battler Dunbine (Tokamak Rovsky, Dolple Giron)
- Saint Seiya (Capricorn Shura, Moses)
- Armored Trooper Votoms (Butchintein)
- The Transformers (Motormaster/Menasor)
- The Transformers 2010 (Sky Lynx, Strafe, Motormaster/Menasor)
- Transformers: Victory (Blacker/Road Caesar)
- Transformers: The Headmasters (Skullcruncher, Doublecross)
- Transformers: Super-God Masterforce (Blood)
- High School! Kimengumi (Yui's Father and Tulip)
- Dr. Slump and Arale-chan (Kurikinton Soramame, Police Chief, others)
- Tatakae!! Ramenman (Jango)
- Fullmetal Alchemist (Tim Marcoh)
- Mashin Eiyuuden Wataru (Don Goro Shougun, Niō aniyan)
- Madö King Granzört (Battoban, Gari ̄ ben)
- Marmalade Boy (Yoshimitsu Miwa)
- Naruto (Hoki)
- Gyandura Densetsu Tetsuya (Zenichi Innami)

=== OVA ===
- Mobile Suit Gundam 0083: Stardust Memory (1991) (Alpha A. Bate)
- Grappler Baki: The Ultimate Fighter (1994) (Atsushi Suedo)

Unknown date

- Mobile Suit Gundam 0080: War in the Pocket (Colonel Killing)
- Guyver (Gregole)
- Legend of the Galactic Heroes (Arthur von Streit)
- Dominion (Mohican)

=== Anime Movie ===
- Transformers: Scramble City (1986) (Motormaster, Menasor)
- Mobile Suit Gundam: Char's Counterattack (1988) (Tooth)
- 3×3 Eyes (1991–1992) (Ryouko)
- Fatal Fury: The Motion Picture (1994) (Laurence Blood)

Unknown date

- Royal Space Force: The Wings of Honneamise (Charichanmi)
- Kinnikuman (series) (Detective Gobugari, Announcer)
- Mobile Suit Gundam (Crown)
- Mobile Suit Gundam II (Koka Lasa)
- Mobile Suit Gundam III (Tokwan)
- Mobile Suit Gundam 0083: Last Blitz of Zeon (Alpha A. Bate)
- Mobile Suit Zeta Gundam (Kacricon Cacooler)
- Mobile Suit Zeta Gundam III (Guwadan Captain, Gady Kinzei)
- Legend of the Galactic Heroes (Ernest Mecklinger)
- Dragon Ball: Legend of Shenron (Soldier)
- Dragon Ball Z (Ginger)
- Dragon Ball Z: Super Saiyan Son Goku (Zeeun)

=== Games ===
- Strider Hiryu (1994 PC-Engine version) (Grandmaster Meio)
- Tobal 2 (1997) (Oliems)
- Metal Gear Solid (1998) (Revolver Ocelot)
- Dead or Alive 2 (1999) (Leon)
- Metal Gear Solid 2: Sons of Liberty (2001) (Revolver Ocelot)
- Dead or Alive 3 (2002) (Leon)
- Ninja Gaiden (2004) (Doku)
- Dead or Alive 4 (2005) (Leon)
- Persona 3 (2006) (Takeharu Kirijo) (replaced by Yasunori Masutani in subsequent games and anime film adaptations)
- BS Dragon Quest (Roujin)
- BS Fire Emblem: Akaneia Senki (Narration, King Akaneia, Ruben Hoka)
- Hokuto no Ken (Arcade) (Jagi)
- Kinnikuman Generations/Kinnikuman Muscle Generations (Pentagon, Canadianman)
- Kinnikuman Muscle Grand Prix Max (Pentagon, Announcer) posthumous work
- Kinnikuman Muscle Grand Prix Max 2 (Pentagon)
- Super Robot Wars (Alpha A. Bate, Cozun Graham, Kacricon Cacooler, Gady Kinzei, Gottn Goh, August Gidan, Netto, Hasha Moja)

=== Tokusatsu ===
- Mirai Sentai Timeranger (Corrupted Financier Dogoal)

=== Dubbing Roles ===
- A Bridge Too Far (Ludwig (Hardy Kruger))
- Con Air (Johnny "Johnny 23" Baca (Danny Trejo))
- Die Hard (Tony (Andreas Wisniewski)
- Dragonheart (Draco)
- ER (Officer Reggie Moore (Cress Williams))
- The Godfather (Fabrizio (Angelo Infanti))
- Highlander II: The Quickening (Corda (Pete Antico))
- Marked for Death (Jimmy Fingers (Tony DeBenedetto))
- The Mask (Dorian Tyrell (Peter Greene))
- The Mummy (Dr. Bey (Erick Avari))
- Red Heat (Yuri Ogarkov (Oleg Vidov))
- The Running Man (Fireball (Jim Brown))
- Scarface (Omar Suarez (F. Murray Abraham))
- Star Wars (Daine Jir (Al Lampert))
- Team America: World Police (Helen Hunt)
- Uncommon Valor (1987 NTV edition) (Kevin Scott (Patrick Swayze))
