= Chisato Nakajima =

Japanese voice actress (born 1961)

- Born: March 10, 1961 (age 65); Ōmiya-ku, Saitama
- Occupations: Actress; voice actress
- Years active: 1982–present

Chisato Nakajima (中島 千里,, Nakajima Chisato; born March 10, 1961 in Ōmiya-ku, Saitama) is a Japanese actress and voice actress affiliated with Aoni Production. Her hobbies include painting, singing, and tennis.

She is most known for the roles of Mari-san, Alisa Mackintosh in Kinnikuman and Percy the Small Engine in the Japanese dub of Thomas the Tank Engine and Friends.

== Notable voice work ==
=== Anime television ===
- Asari-chan (1982) (Pupil)
- Magical Angel Creamy Mami (1983) (Miya Nakahara)
- Miyuki (1983) (Yuko Mizumori)
- Urusei Yatsura (1984)
- Adventures of the Little Koala (1984) (Lala)
- Yume Senshi Wingman (1984) (Kiyomi)
- Saint Seiya (1986) (Esmeralda)
- Maple Town (1986) (Judy (First))
- Sally, the Witch (1989) (Lou)
- Mobile Suit Gundam SEED (2002) (Traffic Controllers/Woman Traffic Controllers)

Unknown date

- Kiteretsu Daihyakka (Midori)
- Kimagure Orange Road (Ushiko, Clerk)
- Kinnikuman (Mari Nikaidō, Alisa Mackintosh, Kinnikuman (Kinniku Suguru) (young (ep.44)) Terryman (young (ep.75)), Gal, Children (A))
- The Kabocha Wine (Mayumi, Cheergirl, Yoshie Ohta, Iyo)
- Shin Bikkuriman (Minerunba)
- Dancouga (Nurse)
- Kimagure Orange Road (Ushiko)
- Hello! Sandybell
- City Hunter 2 (Maiko)
- Hiwou War Chronicles (Children)
- Tiger Mask Nisei (Mina Saiga)
- Cheeky Angel (Yoriko)
- Detective Conan (Housewife A, Woman, Nao Aikou, Hideko Kobayakawa)

=== Film ===
- Nine (1983) (Female Student)
- Kinnikuman Series (1984–86) (Mari Nikaidō)

=== Video games ===
- Neo Graduation (1994) (Maina Yasuda)
- Graduation Vacation (1997) (Maina Yasuda)

=== Dubbing roles ===
- Thomas the Tank Engine and Friends (Percy (Season 1–8), Clarabel (Season 1–8), Stephen Hatt (Season 6) and Bridget Hatt (Season 1)
- Thomas and the Magic Railroad (Percy and Clarabel)
- Dennis the Menace (Joey)
- Rock-a-Doodle (Edmond)
