= 中 =

中 may refer to:

- 中 (U+4E2D), a Unicode character found in the CJK Unified Ideographs (Unicode block)
- China in general
- Chinese culture in general
- Central District (Mandarin Chinese: 中區; pinyin: Zhōng-Qū), Taichung, Taiwan
- Kousuke Atari (Japanese: 中 孝介, romanized: Atari Kōsuke; born 1980), Japanese musician with the surname 中 (Atari)
- Ataru (given name) (Japanese: 中, romanized: Ataru), Japanese given name 中 (Ataru)
- Red dragon mahjong tile, a red 中 tile card in the tile game mahjong
- Red Dragon (2002 film), which uses the red dragon mahjong tile as its symbol

== See also ==
- Zhong (disambiguation) (中 in Mandarin Chinese Pinyin)
- Chung (disambiguation) (中 in Mandarin Chinese Wade-Giles)
- Atari (disambiguation) (中 in Japanese)
- Ataru (disambiguation) (中 in Japanese)
- Center (disambiguation)
- Middle (disambiguation)
- Red dragon (disambiguation)
