= Kinniku =

Kinniku may refer to:

- Ataru Kinniku, character from Yudetamago's manga and anime series Kinnikuman and its sequel Kinnikuman Nisei
- Kinniku Banzuke, weekly Japanese TV program and sports entertainment variety show of the Tokyo Broadcasting System (TBS)
- Kinniku Shōjo Tai, Japanese rock band
- Mayumi Kinniku, character in Yudetamago's manga and anime series Kinnikuman
- Sayuri Kinniku, character from Yudetamago's manga and anime series Kinnikuman

== See also ==
- Kinnikuman, manga created by Yoshinori Nakai and Takashi Shimada
