= Chung =

Chung may refer to:

== Surnames ==
- Chung (surname)
- Jeong (surname), Korean surname
- Zhong (surname), or Chung, Chinese surname
- Cheung, or Chung, Cantonese surname

== Geography ==
- Chung, Iran, a village in Kohgiluyeh and Boyer-Ahmad Province, Iran
- Chung, India, a village in Patti Tehsil, Amritsar, Punjab, India

== Language ==
- Chung language of Cameroon.

== See also ==
- Chan (disambiguation)
- Chong (disambiguation)
- Zhong (disambiguation)
