= Ataru =

Ataru may refer to:

== People ==
- Ataru Nakamura (中村 中, born 1985), Japanese singer-songwriter and actress
- Ataru Esaka (江坂 任, born 1992), Japanese football player
- Ataru Oikawa (及川 中, born 1957), Japanese film director and screenwriter

== Fictional Characters ==
- Ataru Kinniku, a character from the fictional wrestling manga Kinnikuman
- Ataru Moroboshi (諸星 あたる), the main character from Rumiko Takahashi's manga and anime series Urusei Yatsura

== Other uses ==
- Ataru (TV series), TBS series

== See also ==
- 中 (disambiguation)
