= 崇 =

崇, meaning 'exalt', may refer to:

- Chong, a Chinese surname
- Chong (state), a state attacked by King Wen of Zhou.
- Takeshi, a masculine Japanese given name

== See also ==
- Chong (disambiguation)
