= Masaharu Satō =

Japanese actor (born 1946)

- 佐藤 正治
- Born: July 1, 1946 (age 80); Ōta, Tokyo, Japan
- Education: Komazawa University
- Occupations: Actor; voice actor; narrator
- Years active: 1950–present
- Agent: Aoni Production
- Notable credits: Kinnikuman as Buffaloman and Sunshine; Yaiba as Miyamoto Musashi; Mushiking: King of the Beetles as Adah; The Doraemons as Dora-med III; Dragon Ball Super as Master Roshi; Bakuryū Sentai Abaranger as Dezumozorlya
- Spouse: 1
- Website: Official profile

Masaharu Satō (佐藤 正治, Satō Masaharu; born July 1, 1946) is a Japanese actor, voice actor, and narrator affiliated with Aoni Production.

Satō is best known for the roles of Buffaloman and Sunshine in Kinnikuman, Miyamoto Musashi in Yaiba, Adah in Mushiking: King of the Beetles, Dora-med III in The Doraemons, Master Roshi in Dragon Ball Super, and Dezumozorlya in Bakuryū Sentai Abaranger. He has also voiced numerous characters in Kinnikuman, Dr. Slump & Arale-chan, Fist of the North Star, and Dragon Ball.

He also made a voice guest appearance in the third episode of GoGo Sentai Boukenger and Juken Sentai Gekiranger.

== Biography ==
Satō was born in Ōta, Tokyo, Japan on July 1, 1946.

=== As an actor ===
As a child, he joined a children's theater troupe and worked as a child actor. While he was able to balance it out with school, he hated not being able to have fun on Sunday. While in junior high school and Tokyo Metropolitan Shiba Commercial High School, he was a member of the drama club. In his freshman year of high school, he played the lead role and his troupe placed fifth in the metropolitan tournament.

He continued to act while attending the Faculty of Commerce at Komazawa University, but dropped out to form a theater group.

After graduating from the Aoyama Sugisaku Memorial Acting School, Satō joined the Sogen Theater Company and worked as a stage actor while holding down several part-time jobs.

=== As a voice actor ===
Akira Kamiya, a high school classmate and a former member of the same drama club who had already worked as a voice actor, offered Satō a voice acting job, asking, "Would you like to try it if you'd like?" After worrying about it for about two months, and partly because he had been married, he thought, "Oh well, let's give it a try," and after an interview with no test, he officially joined Aoni Production and began his career as a voice actor.

For the Galaxy Express 999 television anime, Satō served as a regular cast member from the beginning, blessed with the opportunity to take on various roles, which lead him to discover the fascination of voice acting. It ended up serving as a turning point for him to be entrusted with important roles, and subsequent roles continued to lead into one another afterward. Regarding this, Akira Kamiya nodded deeply, saying, "Come to think of it, my range of work just kept expanding through the connections of my managers and directors."

=== Current activity ===
He currently serves as a lecturer in the Voice Acting Course, Department of Broadcasting at Osaka University of Arts.

== Filmography ==
=== Television animation ===
1978

- Galaxy Express 999 (Clone B)
- Majokko Tickle (Station Attendant, Employee (A))

1979

- Mobile Suit Gundam (Marigan, Twanning)
- Cyborg 009 (Announcer, Commander, Gasur, Hitman B, Minister of the Military)

1980

- Manga Kotowaza Jiten (Tsuruo)

1981

- Queen Millennia (Councilor A, Teacher)
- Sengoku Majin Goshōgun (Art Cronkite, Chancellor, Secretary, Swan)
- Tiger Mask II (Abdullah The Butcher)
- Taiyou no Kiba Dougram (Dark)
- Dr. Slump (Pagos, Field Farmer, Jr. High Principal, Pig)
- Hello! Sandybell (Scott)

1982

- Ochamegami Monogatari Korokoro Poron (Dionysus)
- Armored Fleet Dairugger XV (Saruta Katz, Al Luciano, Baratalia, Gigolone, Holtes, Nolan, Seidel, Wakasa)
- Space Adventure Cobra (Barg, Gus, Zack Simmons)
- Sentō Mecha Xabungle (Medick)

1983

- Genesis Climber Mospeada (Russ)
- Kinnikuman (Buffaloman, Iwao, Sunshine, Beauty Rhodes, Curry Cook, Devil Magician, Doctor Bombe, Doryman, Dr. Bombay, Gagne Mask, Gania, Kamehame, Kasugano Oyakata, King Cobra, PM Yasuhiro Nakasone, Prince Kamehame, Ramenman, Skull Bozu, Specialman, Station Manager, Tileman, TV Producer)
- Kōsoku Denjin Albegas (General Daston, General Darry, The Great Deran, Vice-Principal)
- Stop! Hibari-kun (Director, Geronimo, Yakuza A)
- Aura Battler Dunbine (Zyaba)
- Arcadia of My Youth: Endless Orbit SSX (Green Izma, Kruger, Secretary of Defense, Soldier)

1984

- Giant Gorg (Dr. Hekkeru)
- Tongari Bōshi no Memoru (Cinthia's Father)
- Fist of the North Star (Belga, Bugal, Elder, Gauguin, Gōda, Juza's Uncle, Kidnapper, Kogure, Village Elder)

1985

- Aoki Ryūsei SPT Layzner (Getey)
- Mobile Suit Zeta Gundam (Dr. Hasan)
- Gegege no Kitarō (Masao)
- Touch (Katagiri)
- Dancougar - Super Beast Machine God (General Gil Dorom)
- Highschool! Kimengumi (Himawari, Ranto Jougai)

1986

- Ai Shoujo Pollyanna Monogatari (Edward Kent)
- Ginga Nagareboshi Gin (Kirikaze, Terry)
- Go-Q-Choji Ikkiman (Ramboman)
- Saint Seiya (Chrysaor Krishna, Docrates, Gigas, Jaki)
- Dragon Ball (Assistant Black, Dolphin, Jasmine, Nao, Pagos, Pig, Rabbit Gang Member, Saber Tiger; Snow's Father)
- Machine Robo: Revenge of Cronos (Blade)

1987

- Kiteretsu Daihyakka (Sasaki-sensei)
- City Hunter (Kurosaki)
- Transformers: The Headmasters (Alpha Trion, Bee Drone, First Aid, Grimlock, Grotusque, Hook, Kaen, Punch-Counterpunch, Sandstorm, Scourge, Searchlight, Skydive, Sureshot, Tantrum, Techna)
- Lady Lady!! (Robert)

1988

- Sakigake!! Otoko Juku (Dokugantetsu, Nightclub Manager, Vice Principal, Yakuza A)
- Tatakae!! Ramenman (Marvelous Hagler, Tiaolong, Tie Guanyin, Treasurer, Village Elder, Yinjiao)
- Transformers: Super God Masterforce (Gilmer)

1989

- Akuma-kun (Guraukosu, Hyakume-Oyaji)
- Transformers: Victory (Frank, Mayor Burns, Perceptor)
- Dragon Ball Z (Blueberry, Boss, Coach, Giant, Gozu, King Cold, Lao Chu, Mezu, Musuka, Olivu, Saichourou, Shenlong, Tard)

1990

- Dragon Warrior (Ivan)
- Mashin Eiyuden Wataru 2 (Death Gondor)

1991

- Kikou Keisatsu Metal Jack (TV Announcer)
- Kinnikuman: Kinnikusei Ōi Sōdatsu-hen (King Mayumi Kinniku, Mammothman, Mariposa, Parthenon, The Manriki)

1993

- Kenyū Densetsu Yaiba (Musashi Miyamoto)
- Ghost Sweeper Mikami (Owner)
- Jungle no Ouja Taa-chan (Dan King)
- Slam Dunk (Hayama, Takatou Riki, Tetsuo)*
- Yūsha Tokkyū Might Gaine (Wolfgang)
- Wakakusa Monogatari Nan to Jou Sensei (Prof. Farth)

1994

- Magic Knight Rayearth (Golem, Monster)
- Red Baron (Sigma Computer - Male Half)

1995

- Kuso Kagaku Sekai Gulliver Boy (Chaptar)
- The Slayers (Soromu, Wizard 1)
- Romeo's Blue Skies (Citron, Old Man B)

1996

- Gegege no Kitarō (Yagyou-san)
- Detective Conan (Kawana)

1997

- Berserk (Hail)
- Chō Mashin Eiyūden Wataru (Rimitta)
- Dragon Ball GT (Black, Shén Lóng)

1998

- Gasaraki (Krause)
- Shadow Skill (Iba Stora)
- Pokémon (Tamaranze)
- Orphen (Batrov)
- Yu-Gi-Oh! (Black, Vice Principal)
- Master Keaton (Prof. Stevens)

1999

- Bucky - The Incredible Kid (Jibaku Ou)
- Dai-Guard (Nishima)
- Blue Gender (Victor)
- Orphen: The Revenge (McGregor)
- Master of Mosquiton '99 (Jijiya, Sage, School President)
- Maze (Woll Dolnard)
- One Piece (John Giant)

2001

- Inuyasha (Goshinki, Nanushi)
- Vandread: The Second Stage (Doyen)
- Angelic Layer (Shuko's Father)
- Rune Soldier (Gonga)

2002

- Ultimate Muscle (Chairman Harabote Muscle, Sunshine, The Coasterman)

2003

- R.O.D -The TV- (Irving)
- Kino's Journey (Immigration Officer)
- Getbackers (Gen Radou)
- Bobobo-bo Bo-bobo (Tuyosi)

2004

- Samurai Champloo (Clerk, Machinenki)
- Futakoi (Kenmochi)
- Ring ni Kakero 1 (Doctor)

2005

- GUNxSWORD (Nero)
- Kouchuu Ouja Mushiking ~Mori no Tami no Densetsu~ (Adah)
- Bleach (Stealth Force Member)
- Beet the Vandel Buster (Captain)
- Beet the Vandel Buster Excellion (Captain)
- Pokémon Advance (Tamaranze)

2006

- Ayakashi: Samurai Horror Tales (Genshiro)
- Idaten Jump (Sebastian)
- Gunparade Orchestra (Commander)

2007

- Gintama (Soul Flat Sugar Master)
- GeGeGe no Kitarō (Gasha Dokuro, KyouRinRin, Old Man)
- Ghost Slayers Ayashi (Doi)
- Bakugan Battle Brawlers (HAL-G)
- Hatarakids My Ham Gumi (Headquarters Chief)

2008

- Code Geass: Lelouch of the Rebellion R2 (Black King)
- Hakaba Kitarō (Hageyama)
- Bleach (Kumoi Gyōkaku)
- Rosario + Vampire (School Chairman)
- Rosario + Vampire Capu2 (School Chairman)

2009

- Dragon Ball Kai (Master Roshi)

2010

- Super Robot Wars OG: The Inspector (Rishuu Toudou)
- Digimon Xros Wars (Gargoylemon)
- Fairy Tail (Ivan Dreyar)

2012

- Shining Hearts (Hank)
- Tanken Driland (Blacksmith Kogoru)
- Digimon Xros Wars: The Young Hunters Who Leapt Through Time (Gargoylemon)

2013

- Attack on Titan (Armin's Grandfather)

2014

- Abarenbō Rikishi!! Matsutarō (Company President)

2015

- Attack on Titan: Junior High (Armin's Grandfather)
- Dragon Ball Super (Master Roshi)

2018

- Sword Gai (Kigetsu)

2021

- Tsukimichi: Moonlit Fantasy (Morris)
- One Piece (Gan Fall)

=== Original video animation (OVA) ===
- Bubblegum Crisis (1987) (Chief Todo)
- Gall Force (1988) (Paranoid Captain, Gorn)
- Legend of the Galactic Heroes (1988) (Erlache)
- Amada Anime Series: Super Mario Bros. (1989) (Koopa, Larry Koopa, Iggy Koopa)
- Mobile Suit Gundam 0083: Stardust Memory (1991) (Bob)
- Ushio and Tora (1992) (Grandpa)
- Detective Conan: Conan vs. Kid vs. Yaiba (2000) (Miyamoto Musashi)
- Mobile Suit Gundam Unicorn (2010) (Hasan)

=== Theatrical animation ===
- Kinnikuman series (1984) (Buffaloman, Iwao)
- The Kabocha Wine (1984) (Kameyama)
- Super Mario Bros.: The Great Mission to Rescue Princess Peach! (1986) (Koopa Troopa)
- Little Nemo: Adventures in Slumberland (1989) (Oompo)
- Dragon Ball Z: The Tree of Might (1990) (Lakasei)
- Dragon Ball Z: Cooler's Revenge (1991) (Doore)
- Dragon Ball Z: Broly – The Legendary Super Saiyan (1993) (King Vegeta)
- Dragon Ball Z: Wrath of the Dragon (1995) (Kame-Sennin)
- Jigoku Sensei Nube (1996) (Vice Principal)
- Dorami & Doraemons: Robot School's Seven Mysteries!? (1996) (Dora-med III)
- Violinist of Hamelin (1996) (Oboe)
- The Doraemons: The Puzzling Challenge Letter of the Mysterious Thief Dorapin! (1997) (Dora-med III)
- The Doraemons: The Great Operating of Springing Insects! (1998) (Dora-med III)
- The Doraemons: Funny Candy of Okashinana? (1999) (Dora-med III)
- The Doraemons: Doki Doki Wildcat Engine! (2000) (Dora-med III)
- Dorami & Doraemons: Space Land's Critical Event! (2001) (Dora-med III)
- One Piece: Baron Omatsuri and the Secret Island (2005) (Keroshot)
- Dragon Ball Z: Battle of Gods (2013) (Master Roshi)
- Dragon Ball Z: Resurrection 'F' (2015) (Master Roshi)

=== Games ===
- Airforce Delta (1999) (Jamie Jones)
- Castlevania series (Death and others)
- Dragon Ball Z (2003) (Porunga)
- Dynasty Warriors series (xxxx) (Zuo Ci)
- Gurumin (2004) (Iwao)
- Kinnikuman New Generation vs. Legends (2002) (Sunshine)
- Kinnikuman Generations series (2004-2006) (Sunshine, Prince Kamehame/First Kinnikuman Great, Chairman)
- Kinnikuman Muscle Grand Prix series (2006-2008) (Sunshine, Chairman)
- Lunar 2: Eternal Blue (1994, 1998) (Lunn)
- Star Ocean: The Second Story (1998) (Indalecio/Gabriel)
- Super Robot Wars Original Generations (2002-2007) (Rishu Togo)
- Xenosaga series (2002-2006) (Sellers)
- SegaSonic the Hedgehog (1993) (Doctor Eggman)
- Policenauts (1994) (Salvatore Toscanini)
- Metal Gear Solid (1998) (Donald Anderson)
- Final Fantasy X (2001) (Zaon, Jyscal Guado)
- Metal Gear Solid 2: Sons of Liberty (2001) (Richard Ames)
- Metal Gear Solid: Portable Ops (2006) (CIA Agent)

=== Tokusatsu ===
- X-Bomber (1980) (Officer B)
- Gridman the Hyper Agent (1993-1994) (Khan Digifer)
- B-Fighter Kabuto (1996) (Mole Beast Mogerado (ep. 6))
- Ultraman Tiga (1996-1997) (Kyrieloid (ep. 3), Ligatron (ep. 4), Alien Raybeak (ep. 13), Alien Muzan (ep. 14), Kyrieloid II (ep. 25), Metamorga (ep. 47))
- Ultraman Dyna (1998-2002) (Alien Shilback (ep. 17), Bishmel (ep. 18))
- Heisei Ultra Seven (1998-2002) (Alien Guts II (1998 ep. 2), Alien Pegassa II (2002 ep. 1))
- Mirai Sentai Timeranger (2000) (Bodyguard Hydrid (ep. 21))
- Kamen Rider Agito (2001) (Hydrozoa Lord / Hydrozoa Ignio (ep. 18 & 19), Lizard Lord / Stellio Dextera (ep. 37), Lizard Lord / Stellio Sinistra (ep. 37 - 39))
- Bakuryuu Sentai Abaranger (2003-2004) (Wicked Life God Dezumozorlya (eps. 1 - 47) /DezumoLijewel (ep. 47)/ DezumoVoorla (Voice by Hidenari Ugaki, Bunkou Ogata) (ep. 48)/ DezumoGevirus (ep. 49 & 50))
- Tokusou Sentai Dekaranger (2004) (Tylerian Durden (ep. 26))
- Gougou Sentai Boukenger (2006) (Tsukumogami Jougami (ep. 3))
- Jūken Sentai Gekiranger (2007) (Confrontation Beast Buffalo-Fist Gyuuya (ep. 3))
- Engine Sentai Go-onger (2008) (Savage Land Barbaric Machine Beast Happa Banki (ep. 17))
- Ultra Galaxy Mega Monster Battle: Never Ending Odyssey (2009) (Alien Reiblood)
- Ultraman Zero Clash! Techtor Gear Black!! (2010) (Jiorugon)
- Shuriken Sentai Ninninger (2015) (Youkai Tengu (ep. 6))

=== Dubbing roles ===
==== Live-action ====
- Black Panther (River Tribe Elder (Isaach de Bankolé))
- Black Panther: Wakanda Forever (River Tribe Elder (Isaach de Bankolé))
- Con Air (Earl "Swamp Thing" Williams (M. C. Gainey), Dale (Dennis Burkley))
- Pistol Whipped (Blue (Paul Calderón))

==== Animation ====
- Thomas the Tank Engine & Friends (Duke)
