= Chong =

Chong may refer to:

- Emperor Chong of Han, emperor of the Chinese Han Dynasty and the ninth emperor of the Eastern Han period (143–145)
- Chong (surname), the romanization of several Chinese and Korean surnames
- Chong or Pear people of Thailand and Cambodia
  - Chong language
- Chong or Limbu people of eastern Nepal, Bhutan, and northeastern India
- Chong (state), an ancient Chinese state allegedly attacked by King Wen of Zhou.

== See also ==
- Chung (disambiguation)
- Zhong (disambiguation)
- Zhang (disambiguation)
- 崇 (disambiguation)
