= Chong Dam-e Ludab =

Village in Kohgiluyeh and Boyer-Ahmad, Iran

Chong Dam-e Ludab چنگ دم لوداب
- Village
- Location within Iran
- Coordinates: 31°03′22″N 50°42′42″E
- Country: Iran
- Province: Kohgiluyeh and Boyer-Ahmad
- County: Boyer-Ahmad
- Bakhsh: Ludab
- Rural District: Ludab

Population (2006)
  - Total: 110
- Time zone: UTC+3:30 (IRST)
  - Summer (DST): UTC+4:30 (IRDT)

Chong Dam-e Ludab (Persian: چنگ دم لوداب, also Romanized as Chong Dam-e Lūdāb; also known as Chowng and Chūng) is a village in Ludab Rural District, Ludab District, Boyer-Ahmad County, Kohgiluyeh and Boyer-Ahmad Province, Iran. At the 2006 census, its population was 110, in 24 families.
