= Zhong =

Zhong can refer to

- Zhong (surname), pinyin romanization of Chinese surnames including 钟, 种, 仲, etc.
- Zhong County, a county of Chongqing, China
- Zhongjian River, a river in Hubei, China
- Bianzhong, a Chinese musical instrument similar to a bell
- Cha zhong, a 3-piece tea brewing vessel, also known as a gaiwan
- The Mean 中, concept of Chinese philosophy (see Doctrine of the Mean)
- Loyalty, one of the precepts in Confucianism.

== See also ==
- Chong (disambiguation)
- 中
