= List of Kinnikuman characters =

A color spread featuring the main cast and prominent villains throughout the Kinnikuman series.

The following is a list of characters from Kinnikuman, a manga/anime series written by Yudetamago. The majority of the cast of Kinnikuman are Choujin (超人 Chōjin; "superhuman"), superpowered individuals who comes in all shapes and sizes, though for the most part adhering to a humanoid form. As the series shifts from being a superhero pastiche to be more wrestling-focused, the Choujins' role also evolves from being superheroes to being superhuman wrestlers. They are initially introduced as a force of good, but as the series progresses, it introduces more morally gray Choujin, such as the Brutal Choujin, or even malicious factions such as the Devil Choujins. The upstanding Choujins would soon be described as Justice Choujins, who typically assume the role of the conventional superhero. The most popular and exemplary Justice Choujins are known as the Idol Choujins, which makes up the principal cast of protagonists. This includes the main protagonist himself, Kinnikuman. many plotlines of the series involve the clashing of the Idol Choujins with various other Choujin factions with nefarious intentions

== Main characters ==
=== Kinnikuman ===
Kinniku Suguru (キン肉スグル), better known as Kinnikuman (キン肉マン), is the main protagonist of the series. He is initially depicted as a bumbling, inept superhero who grows 30 meters tall by consuming garlic. He is soon revealed as the lost prince of Planet Kinniku, the home of the heroic Kinniku clan, having been accidentally abandoned in Japan as an infant due to his parents' oversight. As the series transitions to focus more on wrestling, the superhero parody aspect of his character is slowly phased away to put more emphasis on wrestling. He develops into a more competent character as the series progresses, such as by training under Prince Kamehame to learn the 48 Killer Moves, among which is the iconic Kinniku Buster. He possesses an ability called the "Burning Inner Strength" (火事場のクソ力 Kajiba no Kuso Djikara) which allows him to access more power than he would normally be capable of and make comebacks. In the 21st Choujin Olympics arc, it is revealed that his ugly face is actually a mask, where the removal of it is punishable by death according to the law of the Kinniku clan. Revealing his face has miraculous properties, such as purifying a river or reviving the dead. At the conclusion of the original series, he ascends to the throne to become the 58th king of Planet Kinniku and marries Bibinba. By the time of Kinnikuman Nisei, he would father a son, Kinniku Mantaro, the main protagonist of Nisei. His favorite food is gyuudon and he will do anything for a bowl of it. His real name is Suguru Kinniku (named after Yomiuri Giants pitcher Suguru Egawa) and he is voiced by Akira Kamiya.

=== Meat Alexandria ===
Meat Alexandria (アレキサンドリア・ミート, Arekisandoria Mīto) is Kinnikuman's young sidekick and trainer from Planet Kinniku. He is Kinnikuman's best friend, although he is much smarter than Kinnikuman and often scolds him for being stupid. Meat plays a supporting role throughout the whole series, providing Kinnikuman with advice and encouraging him, as well as admonishing him for his cowardice. He is usually referred to as Meat-kun. During the Devil Choujin arc, Buffaloman splits him into seven pieces. Although Meat cannot fight like the Justice Choujin, he does defeat Mixer Emperor during the Scramble for the Throne arc with a backdrop. In Kinnikuman Nisei, unlike the rest of his peers who chose to enjoy their lives in peace, Meat elects to be cryogenically frozen in order to serve the next generation of Justice Choujins, where he would become the trainer of Kinnikuman's son, Kinniku Mantaro. His character was re-imagined as a diminutive older man in the Ultimate Muscle dub. He is voiced by Minori Matsushima, and by Mike Pollock in the English dub.

=== Idol Choujin ===
Idol Chojin (アイドル超人) is the name given to the core and consistent group of Justice Chojin who fight alongside Kinnikuman. They were originally formed after the 21st Chojin Olympics when the Seven Devil Chojin first showed up for the original intent of challengling Kinnikuman in a match, when he became too injured to fight, Terryman, Robin Mask, Warsman, Brocken Jr., and Wolfman arrived to fill in for him. They later helped out during the Golden Mask Arc, this time with newcomer Geronimo.

==== Terryman ====
Terryman (テリーマン) is Kinnikuman's best friend and most trusted ally. He is depicted as a humble and selfless Choujin who is also a brilliant strategist. Originally introduced as an arrogant Justice Choujin from Amarillo, Texas who is initially antagonistic towards Kinnikuman, he mellows out when he recognizes Kinnikuman's sense of justice and subsequently befriends him. Unlike the other Justice Choujins, Terryman does not possess extravagant finishing moves, instead relying on practical holds such as the Spinning Toe Hold, and is known for defeating much bigger foes than himself. He occasionally tag teams with Kinnikuman under the team name The Machineguns. During the 20th Choujin Olympics, Terryman was shot in the leg shielding Kinnikuman, which led to his leg being amputated and wearing a realistic prosthetic for the rest of the series. During the Dream Choujin Tag Team Tournament, his friendship with Kinnikuman is strained due to the actions of Ashuraman and Sunshine, choosing to partner with Geronimo instead of Kinnikuman. The team would lose in the first round against Ashuraman and Sunshine, where Terryman subsequently inherits the Kinnikuman Great alias from Prince Kamehame and becomes Kinnikuman's partner through the rest of the arc. A running theme in the series is his shoelaces breaking, a bad omen that signifies something bad is about to happen. Terryman eventually marries Natsuko, and he fathers a son, Terry the Kid. His son is a major character in Kinnikuman Nisei. He was modeled after Terry Funk and he is voiced by Hideyuki Tanaka.

==== Robin Mask ====
Robin Mask (ロビンマスク) is a British knight Choujin, serving an antagonist role in the 20th Choujin Olympics arc, having been the winner of the preceding Choujin Olympics, beating the 18th Choujin Olympics champion Uldraman. His armor reduces his strength (for his opponent's sake) as well as providing him remarkable protection. Despite clearly outclassing Kinnikuman in their first fight at the finals of the 20th Choujin Olympics, Kinnikuman was able to defeat him due to his overconfidence. This, along with his exile, made him bitter towards Kinnikuman, culminating in a rematch during Kinnikuman's American tour. This rematch ends with Robin Mask's apparent death. However, Robin survives this fall, and he would masquerade as the cruel trainer Barracuda and trains Warsman for the 21st Chojin Olympics in order to defeat Kinnikuman. He sees the error of his ways after Warsman's defeat, and goes on to join the other Idol Choujins in combating future threats. Robin Mask is notably older than most of his peers, and as a result he often assumes a veteran and leader-like role among the Idol Choujins. He is established in the series as already married to Alisa Mackintosh, and prior to Kinnikuman Nisei he fathers Kevin Mask, who would play a major role in Nisei. His signature move is the Tower Bridge, an Argentine Backbreaker. He is based on Billy Robinson, and he is voiced by Daisuke Gōri.

==== Ramenman ====
Ramenman (ラーメンマン), later known as Mongolman (モンゴルマン), is a Chinese martial arts Choujin. Unlike the majority of characters in the series, Ramenman has a more athletic build, fighting with more Chinese Kenpo instead of more traditional wrestling. He was initially depicted as a violent and remorseless Choujin, murdering Brockenman in cold blood during the 20th Choujin Olympics (this set the tone for future fights in the series, which are often brutal in nature). However, upon losing to Kinnikuman, he began to become less violent, joining the Justice Choujins and often assuming a wise, mentor-like role, particularly towards the young Brocken Jr. During the 21st Choujin Olympics, He was stabbed by Warsman on the temple, rendering him in a vegetative state. Despite this, he would reappear sporadically in a supporting role throughout the following arcs as the masked Choujin Mongolman. Eventually it is revealed that he is only able to function normally while wearing the Mongol mask, which has healing properties. By the time of the Scramble for the Throne arc, Ramenman had recovered enough to fight without the Mongol mask. During the Perfect Origin arc, a flashback reveals that Ramenman had intended to join the Perfect Choujins after winning the 20th Choujin Olympics, but upon his loss to Kinnikuman, he decided against it. Ramenman was a breakout character, becoming so popular that he got his own spin-off series, Tatakae!! Ramenman (although this is established as a separate Ramenman from the one in the main series). He is voiced by Eiji Kanie.

==== Brocken Jr. ====
Brocken Jr. (ブロッケンJr．) is a German Nazi Choujin. However, despite his appearance and heritage, he never portrays any explicit Nazi beliefs. He is the son of Brockenman, who was murdered in cold blood by Ramenman during the 20th Choujin Olympics, and as a result he initially seeks revenge against Ramenman. After his defeat by Ramenman, Ramenman advised him to abandon his hatred, and they become close friends. Brocken Jr. is generally portrayed as a more inexperienced Choujin compared to his fellow Justice Choujins, being slightly younger and more reckless than his peers. In the Scramble for the Throne arc, Brocken Jr. joins Team Soldier, where it is revealed during his match against Team Super Phoenix that the members of the Brocken family are not born Choujins, but instead becomes a Choujin by equipping a special totenkopf. In Kinnikuman Nisei, Brocken Jr. becomes the adoptive father and mentor of Jade. Brocken Jr.'s signature move is the Red Rain of Berlin, a powerful chop that cuts the opponent, which is a family heirloom passed down by the Brocken family. He ranked highly in several character popularity polls, where Yudetamago notes that he appears to be popular among female readers. He is voiced by Tetsuo Mizutori.

==== Warsman ====
Warsman (ウォーズマン) is a Soviet cyborg Choujin. He possesses a pair of retractable claws called Bear Claws. He also has an internal computer that could discover and exploit any weakness, which allows him to calmly judge his opponents so as to defeat them. However, after 30 minutes, his inner computer would begins to overheat and smoke emits from his body, a flaw that is often exploited by his foes. Warsman was introduced as a cold-blooded Choujin, more robot than man, being almost entirely mute save for a sinister breathing sound, and being completely expressionless except for a creepy smile called the Warsman Smile that appears when he fights a formidable opponent. He spent the majority of his initial appearances being commanded by his trainer Barracuda (in actuality a vengeful Robin Mask). After his defeat by Kinnikuman at the 21st Choujin Olympics finals, he regains his compassion, befriending the other Justice Choujins. Even after this change, he maintains a strong student-teacher relationship with Robin Mask. Throughout the rest of the series he struggles with his cyborg nature and his humanity. In Kinnikuman Nisei, Warsman assumes the Kuroe identity, becoming Kevin Mask's trainer. He is voiced by Hideyuki Hori.

==== Wolfman ====
Wolfman (ウルフマン) is a Sumo Yokozuna Choujin. He was modeled after famous sumo wrestler Chiyonofuji Mitsugu and, like him, relied more on strength than weight. He was originally introduced as a contender for the 21st Choujin Olympics and was hostile towards Kinnikuman. After being defeated in a Sumo match by Kinnikuman in the semifinals, he begins to respect Kinnikuman and takes part in combating future threats. He faces Springman in the Devil Choujin arc, but was killed, and later revived by Buffaloman's sacrifice. Prior to the revival series, Wolfman retires from Sumo due to injuries, but despite this he returns to fight the incoming threat of the Omega Centauri's Six Spears, defeating Lunaight. In the anime he is renamed Rikishiman. The Ultimate Muscle dub renamed him again as Sosumi. He is voiced by Masashi Hirose.

==== Geronimo ====
Geronimo (ジェロニモ) is a young Cherokee warrior. Initially, it was left ambiguous whether or not he was a Choujin, since he appeared to be unaffected by leaving his life-support bubble during the Golden Mask arc and his endurance was much lower than a typical Choujin. Regardless, He was able to defeat Sunshine within Warsman's body. Afterwards, it was revealed that he was human all along, and he succumbs to his injuries as a result. He was revived at the conclusion of the Golden Mask arc and after undergoing a special trial he finally becomes a Choujin. He refers to the other Idol Choujin as senpai and is known for his battlecry, U-Ra-Ra!!. Geronimo appears in Kinnikuman Nisei as a trainer for the Hercules Academy. In the dub, he was renamed Beetlebomb and rewritten as being British in origin. He is voiced by Kaneto Shiozawa.

=== Buffaloman ===
Buffaloman (バッファローマン) is a large Spanish Choujin with cow-like horns called the Long Horns. His fighting style relies on his strength and power. Buffaloman is the de facto leader of the Seven Devil Choujins who invaded earth after the 21st Choujin Olympics. In the past, he had made a pact with Satan in order to exponentially increase his power for every Choujin he kills. This eventually led to his notorious 10,000,000 Choujin power (where 100,000 is the average). His splitting of Meat into 7 pieces was the catalyst of the Devil Choujin arc. Despite his nature as a Devil Choujin, Buffaloman fights honorably. He is defeated by Kinnikuman at the climax of the Devil Choujin arc, and subsequently sacrifices his life to resurrect the Justice Choujins that had fallen in battle. He himself was resurrected by Akuma Shogun during the Golden Mask arc in order to serve him, but later betrays him and joins the Justice Choujins after Akuma Shogun is defeated. He joins Team Soldier during the Scramble for the Throne arc. At the beginning of the Perfect Origin arc, Buffaloman declares he has rejoined the Devil Choujins, to the surprise of the Justice Choujins. Throughout the series, Buffaloman loses and regains his Long Horns for various reasons. He is modeled after Bruiser Brody, and he is voiced by Masaharu Satou.

=== Prince Kamehame ===
Prince Kamehame (プリンス・カメハメ) is a veteran Choujin and the former Hawaiian Champion, having lost to Jesse Maivia. During the American Tour arc, he faces and defeats Kinnikuman, remaining one of Kinnikuman's only singles loss, but he sees promise in Kinnikuman and decides to teach him the 48 Killer Moves. Kinnikuman would continue to regard Kamehame as his esteemed master throughout the series. During the Dream Choujin Tag arc, he teams up with Kinnikuman under the alias Kinnikuman Great, hiding his elderly nature. He dies from injuries sustained when shielding Terryman from Sunshine, and passes on the Kinnikuman Great mantle to Terryman. He would return from time to time as a spirit to guide Kinnikuman and his allies. During the Scramble for the Throne arc, Omegaman uses his Omega Metamorphosis technique to channel Kamehame, but this backfires as Kamehame was able to wrest control from Omegaman and instead teaches Kinnikuman the 52 Submission Holds. He is voiced by Masaharu Satou.

== Antagonists ==
=== Devil Choujin ===
==== Satan ====
Satan (サタン) is a major antagonist that has been influencing the events of the series since Kinnikuman's fight with the seven Devil Choujins. However, he has never been directly encountered by the Idol Choujins, although they are aware of his presence. Buffaloman had made a deal with him to gain more power in exchange for murdering Choujin in his name, and later Goldman would make a deal with Satan to gain a new body and become Akuma Shogun, leader of the Devil Knights. He is also implied to have been the originator of the Devil Choujins. The revival series appears to have retconned this to some extent, as Goldman was established as the primary founder of the Devil Choujins, likely with Satan as a benefactor. At the beginning of the True Devil Choujin arc, he deems Akuma Shogun and his Devil Choujins to be not "true" Devil Choujins, trapping them and the other Choujin factions in their respective homes and forming a deal with the Omega Centaurians.

==== Akuma Shogun ====
Akuma Shogun (悪魔将軍) is the final antagonist of the Golden Mask arc. He is initially portrayed as the leader of the Devil Knights and Devil Choujins as a whole, whose body is formed by the fusion of the Devil Knights. In truth, Akuma Shogun is actually Goldman himself, a Choujin God and the original form of the Golden Mask prior to being decapitated. He had made a deal with Satan in order to regain a body so that he may settle his feud with Silverman. Akuma Shogun is capable of hardening and softening his body at will, as well as possessing the Hell's Nine Point Seal technique, a 9-part move which seals off various body parts of the opponent. Kinnikuman was able to defeat him with his new finisher the Kinniku Driver, and he subsequently realizes his folly and fuses with the Silver Mask. In the Perfect Origin arc, Akuma Shogun returns in a larger role, where it is revealed that he was originally Perfect First: Goldman, one of the Perfect Origin. He had left the Perfect Origin and formed the Devil Choujin faction as he felt The Man had grown corrupt. To this end, he resurrects his Devil Choujins and instigates a war between Devil Choujins and Perfect Choujins. He intended to collect all of the Dumbbells, starting with his own Heaven Dumbbell, held by the Perfect Origin in order to definitively end the Perfect Origins' immortal life, but fails to do so due to Psychoman's modifications. At the climax of the arc, Akuma Shogun faces Strong the Budo, in actuality the Choujin Enma/The Man, and defeats him, ending the war with the Devil Choujins' victory. He is voiced by Yonehiko Kitagawa.

==== Six Devil Knights ====
The Six Devil Knights (悪魔六騎士) are the Devil Choujin elite. They steal the Golden Mask, a sacred relic of the Kinniku clan, creating impostor masks and forcing Kinnikuman to use its sibling relic the Silver Mask to find the genuine Golden Mask. The theft of the Golden Mask sapped the power of the Justice Choujins, initially rendering all of them but Kinnikuman unable to fight. After Sneagator and Planetman's defeat, the rest of the Devil Knights retreat to Warsman's body, initiating the Five Story Ring battle in order to save Warsman. In the Perfect Choujin arc, they each fight a member of the Perfect Origin to obtain their Origin Dumbbell. Each of the Devil Knights represent a different "Hell", themed to their character and signature moves.

===== Ashuraman =====
Ashuraman (アシュラマン) is a six-armed, three-faced Devil Choujin, based on the Asura. He is a prince of the demon realm, providing a villainous parallel to Kinnikuman. When he loses an arm, he is able to steal a deceased Choujin's arms to replace it. He represents "Tornado Hell", as he is able to throw small tornadoes using his arms. Ashuraman fights Terryman and even steals the latter's arms, but Terryman was able to fight him to a standstill, resulting in a tie by double count-out. Since he survives this match, Ashuraman would fight Kinnikuman before the latter fights Akuma Shogun, and Kinnikuman was able to defeat him after finding the Ashura Buster's weakness. He teams up with Sunshine for the Dream Choujin Tag tournament, creating cursed dolls to steal the Idol Choujins' friendship power. Eventually, they are defeated by Kinnikuman and the 2nd Kinnikuman Great, but not before having a change of heart due to being touched by Sunshine's empathy. During the Scramble for the Throne arc, he joins Team Soldier, and later he fights Satan Cross, revealed to be his old teacher, to a draw. He sacrifices himself to allow Kinnikuman to face Super Phoenix, but was restored to life with the rest of Team Soldier by Kinnikuman's Face Flash. In the Perfect Origin arc, he fights Justiceman, but was eventually outclassed and defeated, with his arms and faces destroyed. He returns in Kinnikuman Nisei as a major villain of the manga-only Demon Seed arc, but redeems himself once more in the end. He is voiced by Daisuke Gori.

===== Sneagator =====
Sneagator (スニゲーター) is an alligator and sneaker themed Choujin. He was the first opponent that Kinnikuman fought in the Golden Mask Arc. He represents the "Gator Hell", with the ability of turning inanimate objects into various reptiles, although this is eventually revealed to be an illusion. He is also able to shape-shift into various reptilian forms, such as a turtle or a frilled lizard. His true form is the foot of a Tyrannosaurus. Kinnikuman was able to defeat him, but not before he poisoned Kinnikuman, necessitating Wolfman to sacrifice himself to restore Kinnikuman. In the Perfect Origin arc, Sneagator faces one of the Perfect Origin, Ganman, but he was eviscerated by Ganman's horns. He is voiced by Issei Futamata.

===== Planetman =====
Planetman (プラネットマン) is a planet-themed Choujin. His body is made up of the nine planets of the solar system with his head being the legendary 12th planet Vulcan. Representing "Space Hell", he fights with a variety of space and planet-themed moves. He also possesses a technique called Demon Face, which manifests the faces of Kinnikuman's allies all over his body, causing Kinnikuman to hesitate harming him. Ultimately, Kinnikuman was able to triumph over Planetman by punching through Warsman's face, severely harming Warsman in the process. In the Perfect Origin arc, Planetman faces the Perfect Origin Psychoman, but is killed when Psychoman is unfazed by Planetman's Demon Face technique. He is voiced by Hideyuki Tanaka.

===== Junkman =====
Junkman (ジャンクマン) is a Choujin with giant crushing plates as hands, resembling a trash compactor. He represents the "Bloodbath Hell", as his spiked crushing plates would cause his foes to gush blood. He is also able to protrude spikes from his chest, as well as conjuring a face at the back of his head. He fought Robin Mask during the Five-Story Ring battle within Warsman's body. Although he was powerful enough to shatter Robin's sapphire-made armor, Robin eventually defeated him with the Reverse Tower Bridge. In the Perfect Origin arc, Junkman fights Painman, who he is able to defeat by making his air bags more susceptible to popping by heating the air with his Junk Crush. Painman then gives him his Wind Dumbbell. His voice actor is Kazuhiko Kishino.

===== The Ninja =====
The Ninja (ザ・ニンジャ) is a ninja Choujin, employing various ninjutsu techniques such as the "Scorching Hell", where he uses fireballs as mini-suns to scorch an incapacitated opponent. He fought Brocken Jr. during the Five-Story Ring within Warsman's body. Although he had the advantage throughout the fight, Brocken won in the end, with The Ninja impaled on Junkman's spikes. The Ninja turned up alive and became a member of Team Soldier during the Scramble for the Throne arc. He fought Satan Cross and was killed by his Triangle Dreamer, but was brought back to life along with the rest of Team Soldier by Kinnikuman's Face Flash. In the Perfect Origin arc, The Ninja fights and defeats Crowman, and later presents Crowman's Dark Dumbbell to Akuma Shogun. In the Ultimate Muscle dub, The Ninja is renamed Ninja Ned. The Ninja's voice actor is Masashi Hirose.

===== Sunshine =====
Sunshine (サンシャイン) is a large Choujin made out of sand. His technique "Sand Hell" allows him to break down into sand and trap opponents, and he is also able to transform into other forms, such as a top or an arch. He fought Geronimo during the Five Story Ring battle within Warsman's unconscious body. Though he nearly killed Geronimo, he was ultimately defeated by his Apache War Cry technique after his weakness was discovered to be loud noises. Later, in the Dream Choujin Tag arc, he and Ashuraman plot to steal the Friendship Power of the Justice Choujins using Cursed Dolls. They enact their plan during the Dream Tag Tournament, where they compete as the Stray Devil Choujin Combo. After they are defeated by Kinnikuman and Kinnikuman Great during the semi-finals they repent, but Sunshine is killed by Neptuneman. He returns in the Perfect Origin arc, fighting the Perfect Origin Thingman. He defeats Thingman by using his Disc Cutters against him, claiming his Star Dumbbell. He would later insert the remaining Origin's Dumbbells onto the dial at the Choujin Graveyard at Akuma Shogun's behest. He is based on the Sunshine 60 Building in Tokyo. Sunshine is voiced by Masaharu Sato.

==== Seven Devil Choujins ====
The Devil Choujins were notorious for being the most brutal and powerful choujins in the universe, surpassing even previously established brutal Choujin such as Ramenman or Warsman. In the past, the seven were trapped in a space roach motel before being accidentally freed by Kinnikuman. They come to earth in order to challenge the strongest Justice Choujins, and they split Meat's body into seven pieces, each held by a separate member, in order to spur the Justice Choujins into action. They return in the Perfect Origin arc to fight the Perfect Large Numbers.

===== Buffaloman =====
See: Buffaloman

===== Stereo-Cassette King =====
Stereo-Cassette King (Japanese: Stekase King) is a walkman-themed Choujin and the weakest of Buffaloman's henchmen. He was the first Devil Choujin to face Kinnikuman. He has the ability to load various cassette tapes into his body to emulate the signature moves of various Choujins such as Warsman and Ramenman. He was defeated when he mistakenly inserts a cassette of Kinnikuman from 3 years prior, when Kinnikuman was still less competent. He returns in the Perfect Origin arc to face the Perfect Large Number Turboman in Warsman's place. He demonstrates several new tapes such as those based on Neptuneman and Kinnikuman Zebra, but he ultimately loses to Turboman and is destroyed. He is voiced by Issei Futamata.

===== Black Hole =====
Black Hole is a black-colored Choujin who has a giant hole where his face is supposed to be. He has the ability to travel through shadows, and the hole on his head leads to an alternate dimension, and he is able to suck his opponents through his hole into this dimension. However, his body is linked to this dimension, and any wounds he sustain would reflect to cracks within the dimension. He was the second Devil Choujin Kinnikuman faces and defeats. He returned in the Dream Choujin Tag arc, where he teams up with his cousin, Justice Choujin Pentagon, to form the 4D Killer Combo. They are defeated in the first round by the Muscle Brothers. He returns in the Perfect Origin arc to fight Perfect Large Number Dalmatiman, being the only Devil Choujin to decisively defeat his opponent in the first round of matches. He would also defeat another Perfect Large Number, Jak Chi, with the help of his cousin Pentagon, before collapsing from his injuries and acting as a means of transportation for the rest of the arc. He is voiced by Daisuke Gori.

===== Atlantis =====
Atlantis is a gill-man-type Choujin who specializes in fighting underwater and even manipulating water. He faces Robin Mask, luring the latter to an underwater fight that ends with him defeating and drowning Robin Mask. He later fights Kinnikuman, where he employs the Devil Necromancy Blood Bind technique that summoned specters of the fallen Devil Choujins to gang up on Kinnikuman. However, this plan was thwarted by Terryman and Brocken Jr. using a Spirit World mirror provided by Mongolman to defeat the specters, allowing Kinnikuman to defeat Atlantis proper. In the Perfect Origin arc, Atlantis fights Perfect Large Number Marlinman, who he was able to defeat by using Robin Mask's Tower Bridge finisher. Unfortunately, he succumbs to his injuries resulting in a tie. He is voiced by Kazuhiko Kishino.

===== The Mountain =====
The Mountain is an enormous mountain-themed Choujin from the Himalayas and a practitioner of Judo. During the Devil Choujin arc, he fights and was defeated by Terryman. In the Perfect Origin arc, he fights the Perfect Large Number vanguard, Strong the Budo, and was heavily scarred from the fight. Rather than being turned into a human, he chose to die fighting as a Devil Choujin, having his head destroyed by Strong the Budo's Helmet Breaker. He subsequently destroys the suspended ring that they were fighting on with the intent of taking Strong the Budo with him, although this sacrifice was ultimately in vain since Strong the Budo survives the chasm drop. He is voiced by Yonehiko Kitagawa.

===== Mr. Khamen =====
Mister Khamen is a Pharaoh-themed Choujin. He has the ability to encase his foes in a mummy wrapping and subsequently drain them of their moisture using an enlarged straw in order to mummify them. He faces Brocken Jr., who he was able to encase in his mummy package, but he was interrupted by a hooded Mongolman who breaks his neck with a Leg Lariat, killing him. Mr. Khamen returns in the Perfect Origin arc to face Perfect Large Number Crushman, but he was defeated when his mummification technique failed to work on Crushman's steel body. He is a parody of King Tutankhamun and he is voiced by Ryoichi Tanaka.

===== Springman =====
Springman is a spring-themed Choujin that resembled a giant spring with arms and legs. He faces Wolfman, who he constricted until Wolfman was literally torn to pieces. He teams up with Buffaloman to face Kinnikuman and Mongolman in the climax of the Devil Choujin arc, where Mongolman would use his sweat to create a rain cloud that would rust and weaken Springman, allowing Mongolman to defeat him and leaving Kinnikuman to face Buffaloman alone. He returns in the Perfect Origin arc, though he did not face a Perfect Large Number from the first wave. He later fights the Perfect Large Number Grim Reaper, until the match escalates to a tag team with the addition of Buffaloman and Turboman. He was able to kill Turboman before breaking apart from his injuries. Springman is voiced by Hideyuki Tanaka.

=== Five Fated Princes ===
Feeling threatened by Kinnikuman's Burning Inner Strength, the 5 Evil Choujin Gods hatch a plot to prevent Kinnikuman from taking the Kinniku throne. They each grant power and possess 5 different Choujins who had all been born on the same day as Kinnikuman, and who due to a hospital fire could potentially be the true heir to the Kinniku throne, thus creating the Five Fated Princes. The five stakes their claim on the Kinniku throne, and a royal survival series is held to decide the true heir amongst the five and Kinnikuman. In the True Devil Choujin arc, they are called upon by the Evil Gods once more to combat the invading Omega Centauri's Six Spears.

==== Kinnikuman Super Phoenix ====
Kinnikuman Super Phoenix is the main antagonist of the Scramble for the Throne arc. Originally Phoenixman, he grew up poor, although he was intelligent. This eventually led him to despise Kinnikuman, who became famous despite his perceived incompetence. On his mother's deathbed, he was told that he could potentially be the true heir to the Kinniku throne, and Phoenixman began to believe this as fact to a fanatical extent. He is then possessed by the God of Intelligence (知性の神 Chisei no Kami), becoming Kinnikuman Super Phoenix. Super Phoenix is able to perfectly execute the Muscle Revenger, one of the Kinniku clan's three sacred techniques, which lent credence to his claim for the throne. In the survivor series, his team defeats Team Big Body at Aizuwakamatsu Castle and Team Soldier at Nagoya Castle. The arc, and the original run of the series as a whole, culminates with a showdown between him and Kinnikuman at Osaka Castle. Kinnikuman eventually defeats him with the Muscle Spark, claiming the Kinniku Throne. As prophesied in the Muscle Prophecy, Super Phoenix has a heart disease, which he succumbs to after this match. However, as with many of the other fallen Choujins throughout the arc, he is resurrected by Kinnikuman's Face Flash. During the True Devil Choujin Arc, Super Phoenix returns to fight Omegaman Aristera at Azuchi Castle. He is voiced by Michihiro Ikemizu.

==== Kinnikuman Super Phoenix's Team ====
===== Mammothman =====
Mammothman is a hulking, mammoth-themed Choujin, and a member of Team Super Phoenix. He attacks with his brute strength, and employs his tusks and trunk in battle. He wipes out nearly the entirety of Team Big Body, before tying with Cannonballer so Super Phoenix could fight Big Body. When Team Super Phoenix fights Team Soldier, He fights Buffaloman, and the latter tries to take Mammothman down with him by diving into a canyon. However, Mammothman survives this ordeal, and burns Ataru Kinniku's page on the Muscle Prophecy Book, erasing him from existence. Prior to the finals, he ambushes Warsman, rendering him incapable of participating in the finals. He fights Robin Mask in the final, and as Robin Mask is disappearing, he is able to defeat Mammothman with the Ropework Tower Bridge. Mammothman's own page on the Muscle Prophecy book would be immolated, erasing him from existence. He is voiced by Masaharu Satou.

===== Satan Cross =====
Satan Cross appears as a four-armed Centaur Choujin with two faces. He employs Western Ninjutsu as his fighting style. The second face and set of arms and legs are able to separate and act independently from the main body, allowing tandem attacks such as the Triangle Dreamer. Satan Cross is soon revealed to be Samson Teacher, Ashuraman's kindhearted childhood instructor who attempted to teach the young prince empathy, and had seemingly sacrificed himself saving the young Ashuraman from some rapids. In truth, Samson Teacher had survived, but he had lost his legs. The God of Intelligence offered him the parasite Satan Cross, which would repair his mobility, in exchange for becoming his servant. Bitter at the loss of his legs, Samson Teacher accepts, becoming Satan Cross. He joins Team Super Phoenix to repay the God of Intelligence. While fighting Team Soldier, he fights and kills The Ninja, and subsequently ties with his former student Ashuraman. In the finals, Satan Cross was the advance guard, facing Kinnikuman. Kinnikuman was able to defeat him with a Complete Muscle Spark, destroying only the parasite's head and allowing Satan Cross to die as the kind-hearted Samson Teacher. He is voiced by Hidetoshi Nakamura.

===== Prisman =====
Prisman is a prism Choujin who appeared as a member of Kinnikuman Super Phoenix's team during the survivor series. Prisman's trademark technique is the deadly Rainbow Shower, where he channeled sunlight through his body into a beam that could destroy any Choujin's body. Prisman first demonstrated this on the defeated Kinnikuman Zebra's body, reducing him to a skeleton. Prisman first saw action in the ring in a six-man tag team match between Team Super Phoenix and Team Soldier. His head was shattered by Brocken Jr.'s Bremen Sunset, but he survives this ordeal. At the finals, Prisman fights Ramenman, who defeats Prisman by shattering his body into pieces with the Kowloon Wall Drop. He is voiced by Ken Yamaguchi, and later Ryouichi Tanaka.

===== Omegaman Dexia =====
The Omegaman is a Perfect Choujin bounty hunter, tasked by the Choujin Enma to retrieve Choujins that had escaped from the Choujin Graveyard. He comes from the Omega Centauri star system. Omegaman's most distinguishing feature is the giant right hand wrapped around his back, that he uses for various techniques. In addition, he is also able to transform into deceased Choujin, such as Sunshine, Screw Kid, and most notably, Prince Kamehame. The Choujin Enma had tasked him to join Team Super Phoenix in order to capture Neptuneman, who had cheated death. Omegaman, along with Kinnikuman Super Phoenix, fights Kinnikuman and Neptuneman in a tag team match for the climax of the Scramble for the Throne arc. Although he was able to burn Neptuneman's page in the Muscle Prophecy book and erasing him from existence, Kinnikuman was able to defeat him with the Muscle Spark, and he in turn was erased from existence by having his page burned. During the True Devil Choujin arc, it is revealed that this Omegaman is actually Omegaman Dexia, with his left hand counterpart and twin brother Omegaman Aristera playing a major antagonist role. Dexia had been sent to earth and joined the Perfect Choujins as a spy for the Omega Centaurians, but due to his death at the Scramble for the Throne finale, he was unable to return, which proved to be a major setback to the Omega Centaurians' plans. Omegaman is voiced by Ken Yamaguchi.

==== Kinnikuman Mariposa ====
Kinnikuman Mariposa is a luchador-themed Choujin with many high flying, acrobatic maneuvers. Originally known as George the Thief, he turned to a life of crime due to his impoverished upbringing. While living as a thief, he stole the Robin Family heirloom the Anoalo Sceptre, an item capable of controlling flames, and this gave him pyrokinetic abilities. George was chosen by the God of Flight (飛翔の神 Hishou no Kami) to become Kinnikuman Mariposa. At the survival series, Kinnikuman Mariposa's team fought the true Kinnikuman and his allies in the first round in Kumamoto Castle. Mariposa ended up fighting Robin Mask himself, making use of the stolen staff. He was stunned by a beam from a temple on Planet Kinniku when he tried to use a fake Muscle Revenger, a sacred technique used by the Kinniku Royal family, and was ultimately beaten by Robin's Robin Special. He returns in the True Devil Choujin arc, facing Hailman in Bran castle. He showcases a newfound mastery over fire despite lacking the Anoalo Sceptre, and he defeats Hailman with a refined version of his fake Muscle Revenger, the Aztec Cemetery. In the anime he is voiced by Masaharu Satou, and George the Thief is voiced by Sho Hayami.

==== Kinnikuman Mariposa's Team ====
===== The Hawkman =====
A birdman-themed Choujin, and the advance guard of Team Mariposa. The hawk upon his head is a separate organism who can attack in tandem with The Hawkman, as well as transform into other avians such as an owl. The Hawkman also possesses the ability to camouflage with his surroundings. He is defeated by Kinnikuman's Kinniku Driver.

===== Mister VTR =====
Mister VTR (ミスターVTR) is a camera-type Robo Choujin, and the second guard of Team Mariposa. He uses various video-related techniques, such as pausing and shrinking a foe as one would a video. While posing as a relay camera he records the fight between Kinnikuman and The Hawkman and afterwards fights and loses to Kinnikuman. However, after his defeat and right before he dies he takes the footage he had recorded of the Kinniku Driver and edits it, contributing to Mixer Emperor's victory. He is voiced by Toshio Kobayashi.

===== Mixer Emperor =====
Mixer Emperor (ミキサー大帝 Mikisaa Taitei) is a blender-type Choujin, and Team Mariposa's center guard. With the assistance of the 5 Evil Gods, he is able to separate the Burning Inner Strength from Kinnikuman using his Power Separator. This greatly weakens Kinnikuman for the majority of the rest of the arc. As a result of this and Mister VTR's assistance, he was able to defeat Kinnikuman. However, he does not notice when Kinnikuman removes one of his screws shortly before. As a result, Meat is able to shatter him with a Back Drop. He is voiced by Yasuhiko Kawazu.

===== King the 100-Ton =====
King the 100-Ton (キング・ザ・100トン King Za Hyaku Ton) is a weight-type Choujin, acting as the second-in-command of Team Mariposa. He possesses a 100 Ton metal body, making him the heaviest Choujin in the series. His weight body is divided into different parts, allowing him to adjust his weight according to the situation in fights. His body can also transform into iron balls, barbells, and other things, but this requires images from the outside (special cards with a picture of the object on it). He overwhelms Meat with his weight but Terryman takes advantage of his transformations by causing his molecules to rearrange so he can shatter his body with his Calf Branding. However, after the match, he uses the last bit of his power to knock out Terryman, making the match end in a draw. He is voiced by Kazuo Oka.

==== Kinnikuman Big Body ====
Kinnikuman Big Body is a Choujin of great strength and stature, being the physically largest and strongest among the Fated Princes. Originally Strongman, he was chosen by the God of Strength (強力の神 Gouriki no Kami) to become Kinnikuman Big Body. His team fights Team Super Phoenix in the first round at Aizuwakamatsu Castle, where the majority of his team is defeated by Team Super Phoenix's Mammothman alone. Big Body would face Super Phoenix himself, and despite his large size, is instantly defeated by Super Phoenix's proper rendition of the Muscle Revenger, a Kinniku Royal family sacred technique. Big Body returns in the True Devil Choujin arc, where he fights the Omega Centaurian Choujin Gear Master at the Forbidden City. Big Body was able to redeem his brutal loss, defeating Gear Master and showcasing his finisher, the Maple Leaf Clutch. He is voiced by Masato Hirano.

==== Kinnikuman Big Body's Team ====
===== Pinchman =====
A choujin with pliers for a head and forearms. He is the advance guard of Team Big Body. He is defeated by Mammothman. Pinchman is voiced by Takko Ishimori.

===== Leopardon =====
Leopardon is a Choujin based on a Leopard Tank, and the second guard of Team Big Body. He is swiftly defeated by Mammothman in a single strike.

===== Golemman =====
Golemman is a golem-themed Choujin, and the center guard of Team Big Body. He is defeated by Mammothman.

===== Cannonballer =====
Cannonballer is the second-in-command of Team Big Body. He fights Mammothman to a draw when they both simultaneously clothesline each other, but it is immediately revealed that Mammothman lost on purpose so that Super Phoenix can fight Big Body.

==== Kinnikuman Zebra ====
Kinnikuman Zebra is one of the Five Fated Princes from the Scramble from the Throne arc. His name comes from the zebra-stripe pattern covering his body. Originally Powerfulman, he grew up in Africa, where he worked as a farmer to earn money to buy his way into the Choujin Society. His only friend during this period of his life was his pet zebra Zebra Kid. When he went to gain admission by offering the money he had earned, he was denied but then offered admission if he killed Kid. He did so and from then on, he trusted only those who live for money. He was chosen by the God of Technique (技巧の神 Gikou no Kami), turning him into Kinnikuman Zebra. He organizes Team Zebra by hiring various choujins and paying them large sums of money. They fought against Team Kinnikuman at Himeji Castle. Zebra is usually a clean fighter (White Form), but when he steps into Parthenon's shadow his stripes cover most of his body and his brutal side emerges (Black Form). He is also able to do the Muscle Inferno, one of the sacred techniques of the Kinniku clan, but it was revealed that it is an incomplete version, allowing Kinnikuman to escape the move and defeat Zebra. He returns in the True Devil Choujin arc, fighting Mariquitaman at Castel del Monte, and despite reconciling his two forms and perfecting the Muscle Inferno, he is defeated nonetheless. He is voiced by Hirohiko Kakegawa.

==== Kinnikuman Zebra's Team ====
===== The Vice =====
The Vice (ザ・マンリキ Za Manriki) is the advance guard of Team Zebra. As his name indicates, he is a Choujin with a scramble vice protruding from his shoulders which he uses to crush opponents. It is powerful enough to crush steel and diamond and can also grow from areas other than his shoulders. He dominates Meat but then faces the recently revived Warsman. At first Warsman forgets his fighting style and is overwhelmed, but he is eventually defeated with the Palo Special. He is voiced by Masaharu Satou.

===== Motorman =====
Motorman (モーターマン) is the sentient Choujin power source for Robo Choujin Bikeman as well as the second guard of Team Zebra. He has a very simple design with a drill-shaped head, batteries for hands and feet, and a motor body. He easily dominated Terryman, but he revived Ramenman's fighting intuition and was ripped in half by the Camel Clutch. Zebra later admits his role in the team is primarily to support Bikeman. He is voiced by Yasuhiko Kawazu.

===== Bikeman =====
Bikeman (バイクマン Baikuman) is a Machine Choujin the form of a motorbike and served as Kinnikuman Zebra's Center Guard. At first, he was called Riderman (ライダーマン), but a character with the same name appeared in Kamen Rider V3, so it was changed to Bikeman. He is usually shaped like a normal human, but he can transform into the shape of an autobike. Ramenman disguised himself as Bikeman before making his debut in the Scramble for the Throne arc, and subsequently faces the real Bikeman after defeating Motorman. Ramenman defeats him with the Kowloon Wall Drop. He is voiced by Masato Hirano.

===== Parthenon =====
Parthenon (パルテノン) is a Choujin modeled after the real-life temple Parthenon. His shadow has the power to bring out Zebra's brutal personality. His entire body is made up of sculptures. Thousands of dead creatures are inside his temple body, and his pillars are filled with methane gas. He was paid a large sum of money to join Team Zebra, and when he is defeated this money was scattered throughout the arena. In the last match of the semifinals, he teamed up with Zebra in a Tag Match against Kinnikuman and Robin Mask. He trapped Robin inside his pillars with his "Body Petrification Trap", but Robin escaped using the Anoalo Sceptre. He then broke Parthenon in half with his Tower Bridge and finished him off with the Robin Special. He is voiced by Masaharu Satou.

==== Kinnikuman Soldier ====
Kinnikuman Soldier was first introduced as an army-themed Choujin named Soldierman who was chosen by the God of Brutality to become Kinnikuman Soldier. However, the Kinnikuman Soldier who appears for the majority of the series is actually Ataru Kinniku, Kinnikuman's long lost older brother. Ataru had walked out of the Kinniku clan after becoming fed up of his spartan training. During the Scramble for the Throne arc, he attacks the original Kinnikuman Soldier and takes his place. Ataru then gathers a team consisting of Brocken Jr., Buffaloman, The Ninja and Ashuraman, forming the Choujin Blood Brigade (超人血盟軍, Choujin Ketsumeigun). His goal is to show Kinnikuman the True Friendship Power, in order for Kinnikuman to be able to face Super Phoenix. His identity was only made public during his fight with Super Phoenix at Nagoya Castle; however, Super Phoenix would burn his page on the Muscle Prophecy Book, which causes him to slowly fade out of existence. Before fading completely, he shows Kinnikuman his incomplete version of the Muscle Spark, allowing Kinnikuman to later develop the perfected Muscle Spark. His ashes would continue to assist Kinnikuman posthumously during his fight against Team Super Phoenix. Like the rest of Team Soldier, he is revived by Kinnikuman's Face Flash at the conclusion of the arc. Ataru fights with a mixture of his teammates' signature moves as well as his own original moves, such as the Napalm Stretch. He is voiced by Shigeru Chiba.

=== Perfect Choujin ===
The Perfect Choujin (完璧超人 Kanpeki Chōjin) are a group of Choujin, being the very first faction created. They possess godlike strength and transcend emotions, and as a result look down upon all other Choujin with contempt, deeming them inferior. They have several strict rules, such as to never turn one's back towards the enemy or that defeat is punishable by death. During the Dream Choujin Tag arc, a group of Perfect Choujins infiltrate the tournament in order to hunt the masks of the competitors, in preparation of a full scale Perfect Choujin army invasion.

==== Perfect Origin ====
The Perfect Origin are the very first Perfect Choujins to ever exist. In the distant past, the Choujin Gods have decided that Choujins have become corrupt, oppressing the weak, and they decided to wipe them out with the Capilaria rays. However, one particular God believes the Choujin race is redeemable, renouncing his Godhood to become a Choujin, now called The Man, and selecting ten Choujins to spare from the genocide, granting them immortality and taking them in as his disciples. These ten Choujins would be known as the Perfect Origin. Together with The Man, they would go to the Choujin world and occasionally cull the Choujin population. They reside at a reclusive island called Mont Saint Parfait, which leads to the Choujin Graveyard, The Man's domain. Despite The Man growing more paranoid and corrupt and assuming the name Choujin Enma, most of the Origin remains loyal to him, save for Goldman and Silverman. Each of the Origin possesses an Origin Dumbbell, which when all 10 is slotted into a dial in the Choujin Graveyard, would wipe The Man and the Origin's existence. This is Akuma Shogun's goal, and to this end he sends his Devil Knights to face the Perfect Origin. Subsequently, the surviving Perfect Origin would face a mix of Justice and Devil Choujins at the Unforgiven Yggdrasil, an ancient tree that the ancient non-Perfect Choujins had sheltered in to avoid the Capilaria rays. Unlike the Perfect Large Numbers, the titles of the Perfect Origin simply follow the format of "Perfect" followed by their designated number.

===== Choujin Enma =====
The Choujin Enma is the ruler of the Choujin Graveyard, who manages the deceased choujins. He appears as a background character in the original series, but becomes prominent in the Perfect Origin arc. The Choujin Enma was previously a literal Choujin God who saw potential among the Choujin race about to be wiped out by his fellow Gods. He chose to renounce his Godhood to become a Choujin, becoming Perfect Zero: The Man, and sparing ten promising Choujins, recruiting them as his disciples, the Perfect Origin, the very first Perfect Choujins. Over time, The Man grew paranoid about his and his Perfect Origins' perfection being tainted, becoming more disdainful of "inferior" Choujins, as well as assuming the name Choujin Enma, as he continues to manipulate various events throughout history from behind the scenes. He first appears in the series proper under the name and disguise of Perfect Warrior Strong the Budo, greatly resembling Big the Budo. He fights The Mountain at the Grand Canyon, and despite the latter's attempt to sacrifice himself and take Strong the Budo with him, he survives and returns, revealing himself as the Choujin Enma. At the climax of the arc, he fights his former disciple Goldman, now Akuma Shogun, at Uluru. Akuma Shogun surpasses and defeats Choujin Enma, destroying his Strong the Budo armor and winning the war for the Devil Choujins. In the True Devil Choujin arc, the Omega Centaurians reveal that The Man was responsible for their exile, and as a result they swear an unwavering vengeance against him.

===== Goldman =====
See: Akuma Shogun

===== Silverman =====
Perfect Second: Silverman was the progenitor of the Justice Choujin faction. His descendants are what would become the Kinniku clan. Silverman was the original creator of techniques that would later be refined by the Kinniku clan to become the Muscle Curtain and the Muscle Spark (His version of the Muscle Spark, the Arrogant Spark, is a lethal version of the Muscle Spark). He had left the Perfect Origin to convince his brother to return, but also to create his own faction of "inferior" choujins based on the ideals of justice and mercy. However, his clash with his brother would eventually lead to their mutual decapitation, and he would then become the Silver Mask. As the Silver Mask, he assists Kinnikuman to find the genuine Golden Mask, and to convince his brother to end their feud. He returns as Silverman proper in the Perfect Origin arc, giving his Earth Dumbbell to his brother Akuma Shogun and having been granted enough power to manifest a body for a single match. He fights his old best friend Psychoman at the Unforgiven Yggdrasil, defeating him with the Arrogant Spark and claiming his Thunder Dumbbell. Shortly afterwards, he runs out of power, being reduced to the Silver Mask once again and resuming his place at the altar in Planet Kinniku.

===== Mirageman =====
Perfect Third: Mirageman is an ebony Choujin with mirror-like powers, including creating mirages and possessing a weapon upon his left arm called the Kaleidoscope Drill. He is the guardian of Mont Saint Parfait, using his mirage powers to misdirect any unworthy Choujins wishing to become a Perfect Choujin. He fights Akuma Shogun when he invades Mont Saint Parfait. Akuma Shogun easily severs his Kaleidoscope Drill, criticizing his and the Perfect Origin as a whole's lack of growth, and defeats him with the Hell's Guillotine. He then claims Mirageman's Ice Dumbbell.

===== Abyssman =====
Perfect Fourth: Abyssman is the Choujin who guards the Choujin Graveyard, and the leader of the demons of the Choujin Graveyard. He takes the Perfect Choujin rule of "never showing one's back to the enemy" to its logical extreme, devising a technique, the Abyss Guardian, that would manifest a shield that repels any attack when his back is attacked. He wears a mask over the lower half of his face, which had been heavily scarred by The Man for having allowed Goldman to attack his back. When Akuma Shogun arrives at the Choujin Graveyard, he faces Abyssman. Akuma Shogun was able to endure Abyssman's finisher, the Abyss Decapitation, but this destroyed Akuma Shogun's body hardness changing ability. Akuma Shogun was able to destroy the Abyss Guardian, and completes the full Hell's Nine Point Seal sequence, defeating Abyssman. He subsequently takes Abyssman's Fire Dumbbell.

===== Painman =====
Perfect Fifth: Painman is a Choujin covered with various airbag-like implements all over his body. This allows him to absorb any attacks directed at him, effectively making him impervious to pain. Painman is also able to create dummies of himself. He fights Junkman at the bottom of the Choujin Graveyard. Junkman struggled to do any harm against Painman, due to none of his attacks fazing him, with even his spikes being unable to puncture Painman's airbags. Eventually, Junkman realizes that by whiffing his Junk Crushes, he can raise the temperature, causing the air within Painman's airbags to swell, making them fragile enough for Junkman to pop, allowing him to defeat Painman. He then entrusts Junkman with his Wind Dumbbell.

===== Justiceman =====
Perfect Sixth: Justiceman is a Perfect Choujin who was known as the God of Judgment. His role was alluded to in the Golden Mask arc, being the being who instigated and judged the conflict between Goldman and Silverman and subsequently provide them with swords, leading to their mutual beheading. Justiceman carries a scale which he uses to judge whether his opponent fights for a righteous cause. Justiceman fights with relatively simple techniques and sheer power. He fights Ashuraman in the demon world, whose ancestor had stolen the arms of his student Milosman to begin the Ashura clan. Justiceman would mercilessly defeat Ashuraman, destroying his arms and faces. At the Unforgiven Yggdrasil, Justiceman fights Terryman, and similarly, was able to dominate him. In comparison with Justiceman's last opponent, Terryman didn't seem to fare any better than the latter. However, upon noticing Terryman's resolve to keep fighting despite the possibility of irreparably damaging his advanced prosthetic, he surrenders, bestowing his Light Dumbbell to Terryman. He then assumes a neutral party, wishing to find his own path, and occasionally assisting the Justice Choujins from behind the scenes, such as when Kinnikuman was rushing to face the Omega Centauri's Six Spears.

===== Ganman =====
Perfect Seventh: Ganman is a cyclopean Choujin with a large pair of antlers called the Elk Horns. His single eye is able to reveal the illusions and disguises of his opponents, as well as provide foresight into his opponent's actions. Due to this ability, he has a great disdain for individuals who hide their true nature. He faces Sneagator at the Leaning Tower of Pisa. Sneagator's multiple transformations proved ineffectual, and Ganman shredded Sneagator with his Elk Horns. He then faces Buffaloman, wishing to avenge his teacher, at the Unforgiven Yggdrasil. Although Ganman initially had the upper hand, Buffaloman began to go toe to toe with him once he had embraced his honorable fighting style at Kinnikuman and Akuma Shogun's urging. Ganman would begin to waver when Buffaloman question why he had not used his eye to reveal Choujin Enma's true nature, allowing Buffaloman to defeat him, destroying his Elk Horns. He admits that he lost because he had been lying to himself, gives the Earth Dumbbell to Buffaloman, and dies.

===== Thingman =====
Perfect Eighth: Thingman is a large, metallic Choujin made out of an indestructible material from outer space. Upon his shoulders are a pair of rotating blades called the Disc Cutter, also made of the same material as himself. He is able to clash his arms together to send a destructive sound wave. Thingman faces Sunshine at the palm of the Statue of Liberty, which Thingman explains was originally a statue of the Choujin Enma, and he subsequently restores it to this form. He was able to turn Sunshine into concrete, and using his Demolition Wave, cause him to crumble. However, Sunshine tricks Thingman to fling him around in a sack, restoring him to his original form. Sunshine subsequently jams Thingman's Disc Cutters, using them to defeat Thingman. Sunshine then takes Thingman's Star Dumbbell, and kills Thingman with it.

===== Crowman =====
Perfect Ninth: Crowman(Japanese: Karasman) is a crow-themed Choujin. He uses attacks involving his wings, and he commands a flock of crows. Crowman faces The Ninja at the Silver Pavilion, revealing that it had originally been Silverman's training hall where he had raised the very first Justice Choujins. After a back and forth battle, Crowman was able to gain the upper hand, repeatedly impaling The Ninja's chest. However, Brocken Jr. and the rest of the Justice Choujins were able to encourage him by assuming a formation harkening back to The Ninja's time as part of Team Soldier. The Ninja was then able to trap Crowman with his Spider Web Binding technique. Crowman was able to escape this trap by swapping places with The Ninja, who would then assume Crowman's form and swap back in retaliation. The two would swap back and forth several times with their respective substitution techniques, until the real Crowman was sliced to pieces by the steel ropes of Spider Web Binding technique. The Ninja then takes Crowman's Dark Dumbbell.

===== Psychoman =====
Perfect Tenth: Psychoman is a flamboyant, clown-themed Choujin. He was the originator of the Magnet Power that Neptune King would use in the Dream Choujin Tag arc. Amoral, Psychoman looks down on all choujins, even his fellow Perfect Origin, with the exception of his dearest friend Silverman. Psychoman debuts as the Perfect Large Number, Perfect Phantom Grim Reaper, coming with the second wave of Perfect Large Numbers. He faces Springman in the step pyramid battle, before the match escalates to a tag team with Buffaloman and Turboman in tow. After Buffaloman defeats him, he goads Buffaloman to kill him, after which he apparently disappears. However, he later reappears at Sagrada Familia, revealing himself to be the Perfect Origin Psychoman, in order to fight Planetman. Planetman uses his Demon Face technique, but is killed by Psychoman who is not fazed at the idea of murdering his "comrades". Psychoman would later fight Brocken Jr. at the Unforgiven Yggdrasil. Despite Brocken Jr.'s valiant attempt, he was defeated by Psychoman. As he was about to deal the finishing blow, Psychoman was interrupted by his old friend Silverman, who pleaded him to spare Brocken, and fight him instead. The two fight, with Silverman coming out on top and taking his Thunder Dumbbell, the last Dumbbell Akuma Shogun needed to activate the dial that would erase all of the Perfect Origins from existence. However, Psychoman had secretly modified the device, making it erase him and he alone upon the dial's activation.

==== Perfect Large Numbers ====
The Perfect Large Numbers are among the upper echelon of Perfect Choujins. Several days after the signing of the peace treaty, they invade earth with a declaration of war, denouncing that Neptune King's group of Perfect Choujins that had appeared during the Dream Choujin Tag arc as a weak renegade faction. The Perfect Large Numbers have a more extreme and hardline adherence to the Perfect Choujin rules, especially the "defeat equals death" rule. Although they initially plan to fight the Justice Choujin, this plan was interrupted by the arrival of the Devil Choujins. Later, a second wave of Perfect Large Numbers appear, who along with the survivors of the first wave challenges the Idol and Devil Choujins at the step pyramid battle. Each of the Perfect Large Number has a moniker of the format "Perfect X", where X is a noun that represents each Perfect Large Number.

===== Strong the Budo =====
See: Choujin Enma

===== Nemesis =====
Perfect Muscle Nemesis is a Perfect Choujin, debuting as part of the second wave of Perfect Large Numbers. Nemesis was clearly a member of the Kinniku clan, possessing several physical features associated with the clan. He is soon revealed to formerly be Sadaharu Kinniku, Tatsunori Kinniku's younger brother, making him Kinnikuman's great uncle. He possesses a prodigious wrestling prowess, including being capable of doing the Muscle Spark at a young age, leading him to be imprisoned and erased from history for fear of his strength. Upon learning of his impending execution, Sadaharu escapes his prison and goes to Mont Saint Parfait, in order to become a Perfect Choujin. Mirageman would baptise him upon realizing his heritage, turning him into Nemesis. His opinion of the Justice Choujins remained ambivalent, however, until he learned that his brother Tatsunori had been kidnapped by members of the royal court in an attempted coup, and although Tatsunori survives this ordeal, this led to Nemesis losing faith in the Kinniku clan, wishing to see the clan burn. He fights and kills Robin Mask at the step pyramid battle, and he also defeats Ramenman at the Unforgiven Yggdrasil, though Ramenman survives. At the penultimate fight of the arc, he faces Kinnikuman, as the ultimate clash of Justice Choujin and Perfect Choujin ideals. Kinnikuman was able to defeat him with the Muscle Spark, rendering him unable to kill himself, and due to Peek-a-Boo and Neptuneman's interference, Strong the Budo was also prevented from taking his life.

===== Max Radial =====
Perfect Shredder Max Radial is a truck-themed Choujin with giant shoulder tires and suspension legs. He shreds his opponents using the tires on his shoulders. He is the first Perfect Large Number fought. As all the other Idol Choujins are recuperating, Terryman is forced to fight Max Radial at the Tokyo Dome. Although he initially struggled against Max Radial due to his physical properties preventing Terryman from using his signature techniques, Terryman was able to defeat him with the Calf Branding once he destroys one of his shoulder tires. He subsequently commits suicide with Strong the Budo's sword, setting the tone for the Perfect Large Numbers' ideals of taking one's life after a loss.

===== Dalmatiman =====
Perfect Fang Dalmatiman is a dalmatian-themed choujin who attacks with powerful bits and agile maneuvers. He is able to rearrange the spots in his body, such as shifting them to his face to turn his head into that of a Doberman's or expelling them as a speckle bomb. He fights Black Hole on the Great Wall of China. Despite countering several of Black Hole's moves, he was tricked to choose a bone-shaped wound while trapped in Black Hole's dimension, which had actually been self-inflicted deliberately by Black Hole. This allowed Black Hole to predict where Dalmatiman was going to emerge, allowing Black Hole to defeat him. Dalmatiman attempts to commit suicide by impaling himself onto a sharpened corner pole, but Black Hole beheads him before he is able to do so.

===== Turboman =====
Perfect Finish Turboman(Japanese: Turbomen) is a dark-colored choujin with large gauntlets that resemble revolver barrels. He has the unique ability of storing any power generated by his opponent's attacks and transferring them back to the opponent with an apparatus called the Earth Unit in order to overcharge them. He fights Stereo-Cassette King at the Red Square, and despite Stereo-Cassette King's early commanding lead, Turboman was able to defeat him with ease by channeling his stored energy into Stereo-Cassette King, destroying his limbs. He later fights Buffaloman at the step pyramid battle, who seeks vengeance for Stereo-Cassette King's death. The match soon escalates to a tag match as the ring they were fighting on is destroyed, and they land on the ring where Springman and Grim Reaper were fighting. He was able to overcharge Springman to cause him to harden and subsequently disintegrate, but not before he himself was gored by Springman and Buffaloman's combination attack. Grim Reaper would harvest his Earth Unit, leaving him a corpse.

===== Crushman =====
Perfect Palm Crushman is a metallic Choujin with a large steel palm called the Iron Glove which he uses to crush his opponents, lending to his name. He fights Mr. Khamen at Brandenburg Gate, whose techniques prove ineffective against Crushman due to his steel body, And Crushman promptly crushes him with ease. At the step pyramid battle, Crushman fights Brocken Jr. Despite Brocken's early lead, Crushman was able to rile up Brocken, even managing to use the Iron Glove technique against Brocken. After Ramenman told Brocken to calm down, he was able to break off one of the Iron Glove's plates and defeat Crushman with his Red Rain of Berlin. Crushman then kills himself by destroying his own heart.

===== Marlinman =====
Perfect Spike Marlinman is an aquatic Choujin resembling his namesake, the marlin. Similar to the Devil Choujin Atlantis, he specializes in fighting underwater, and he utilizes his sharpened spear-like bill to fight. He fights Atlantis at a ring over the River Thames. The battle eventually led to an aquatic one, where they was able to resist each other's attacks. Ultimately, Atlantis uses Robin Mask's signature move, the Tower Bridge, to kill Marlinman, but Atlantis himself succumbs to his injuries and dies himself, resulting in a draw.

===== Peek-a-Boo =====
Perfect Fright Peek-a-Boo is a baby-themed Choujin. As his namesake implies, he has palm-like appendages that obscures his face and abdomen. Peek-a-Boo initially has an infantile personality, rapidly learning his opponents moves and maturing within the course of a single match. He defeats his foes with this method, and Strong the Budo would subsequently "reset" him to his infant state. This constant resetting makes Peek-a-Boo resentful towards Strong the Budo. He fights Kinnikuman at Ryogoku Hall, quickly assimilating Kinnikuman's 48 Killing Moves. However, Kinnikuman realizes this, instead relying on basic techniques that Peek-a-Boo was unable to counter, eventually defeating him with the Furinkazan. He planned to commit suicide like his peers, but Kinnikuman was able to dissuade him, encouraging him to live on and get stronger. Upon the arrival of the 2nd Perfect Large Numbers corps, Nemesis attempts to execute Peek-a-Boo for his betrayal, and although Kinnikuman was able to interrupt the assault, Peek-a-Boo was still seriously injured. He later rescues Neptuneman off-screen, and encourages the frightened Kinnikuman to face Nemesis. In the Kinnikuman vs Nemesis fight, Peek-a-Boo would serve as Nemesis's second, providing him advice to counter Kinnikuman's moves.

===== Marvelous =====
Perfect Rise Marvelous is a dragon-themed Choujin. He employs Chinese Kung Fu to fight, as well as the two dragon heads on his shoulders that can extend and bite his opponents. At the step pyramid battle, Marvelous fights Ramenman, who he taunts by comparing Ramenman's older merciless self and the teachings of Choujin Kenpo to be similar to the Perfect Choujin ideology. He reveals that like Ramenman, he was also a student of Choujin Kenpo, before deciding to become a Perfect Choujin. Ramenman was undeterred by Marvelous's taunting, defeating him with a strangling Kowloon Wall Drop, sparing his life and rendering him too weak to commit suicide. However, with Nemesis's urging, Marvelous was able to muster enough strength to command one of his dragon heads to kill himself.

===== Jack Faucet =====
Perfect Flow Jack Faucet (ジャック・チー Jakku chī) is a faucet-themed Choujin. Using the spouts on his body, he is able to blast hot and cold water. At the step pyramid battle, he fights Black Hole, fresh after his fight with Dalmatiman. By using his dowsing ability and using mist to obscure the sunlight, he is able to shut down Black Hole's fourth-dimension wrestling. Black Hole would accidentally suck in his brother Pentagon, and Pentagon would then emerge from Black Hole's body. He fights and greatly weakens Jack Faucet before morphing back to Black Hole, allowing Black Hole to deal the finishing move. Black Hole attempts to behead Jack Faucet, but Jack Faucet was able to commit suicide first by stepping into a geyser he had created.

===== Polarman =====
Perfect Power Polarman is a large polar bear-themed Choujin, possessing great strength and retractable claws. At the step pyramid battle, he fights Warsman, who is enraged due to Robin's death at the hands of Nemesis and began fighting without regard to himself. They clash with their respective claws, with Polarman able to shatter Warsman's, and he heavily damages Warsman. Eventually, with Kinnikuman's encouragement and his remembering of Robin Mask's teachings, Warsman was able to regain his composure and puts Polarman in his signature Palo Special. which finishes off Polarman despite the latter unmasking Warsman. This left Polarman unable to commit suicide, but Nemesis would assist in Polarman's suicide by using his paw to stab himself in the chest.

===== Grim Reaper =====
See: Psychoman

==== Vanguard ====
===== Neptuneman =====
Neptuneman is introduced as the leader of the Perfect Choujins. His appearance and mannerisms are explicitly based on Hulk Hogan. Neptuneman employs the Magnet Power that Big the Budo also uses, most notably for their tag team attack Cross Bomber, which is a double clothesline enhanced by Magnet Power that is the pair's primary means of harvesting the masks of Choujins. Upon his debut, Robin Mask correctly recognizes him as Quarrelman, Robin Mask's old rival who had outclassed him in the 20th Choujin Olympics selections. Quarrelman had become dissatisfied by the lack of contenders when he encounters Neptune King, who bequeaths to him the Neptune Mask and dubs him the Perfect Choujin Neptuneman. Neptuneman and Big the Budo would be defeated by Kinnikuman and Terryman at the climax of the Dream Choujin Tag arc, where he realizes the hypocrisy of Big the Budo and sacrifices himself to stave off the Perfect Choujin invasion. He reappears in the Scramble for the Throne arc under the disguise The Samurai, being on the run from Omegaman for having cheated death. He assists Kinnikuman in his fight against Team Super Phoenix. In the Perfect Origin arc, Neptuneman was branded a traitor for signing the peace treaty of the three factions even though he rallied the main Perfect Choujin Faction behind it. Despite this he remained loyal to the Perfect Choujin ideal, though he believes that it has been corrupted and is in need of a reform. He is voiced by Kazuhiko Kishino.

===== Big the Budo =====
Big the Budo is Neptuneman's tag partner, taking the appearance of a giant bogu-clad warrior. He has mastery over an ability called Magnet Power, which allows him to attract or repel metallic objects, as well as his partner Neptuneman. Magnet Power is derived from the earth itself, and Kinnikuman would eventually be able to seal it off by closing an Apollo Window, a conduit to their power. Neptuneman and Big the Budo enters the Dream Choujin Tag tournament as the Hell Missionaries, with the express purpose of hunting down the masks of the greatest Justice Choujins. During the finals, His true identity is revealed to be that of the true Perfect Choujin Don, Neptune King (ネプチューンキング), who had given Neptuneman his Neptune Mask, in truth being his superior instead of the other way around. He along with Neptuneman are defeated by Kinnikuman and Terryman via Muscle Docking. This shatters his Neptune Mask, revealing an emaciated elderly face, and Neptune King succumbs to his injuries and advanced age shortly afterwards. He is voiced by Yonehiko Kitagawa.

===== Screw Kid =====
Screw Kid (スクリューキッド) is a screw-themed Perfect Choujin who served Big the Budo. He and Kendaman crashed the tag championships, quickly defeating Brocken Jr. and Wolfman. However, they lost their next match against Buffaloman and Mongolman. Fearing death for his failure, Screw Kid attacked Big the Budō to try to save his own life but was crumbled to dust by his master's power. He had the power to extend sharp drill bits from his hands and knees. He is voiced by Kaneto Shiozawa.

===== Kendaman =====
Kendaman (ケンダマン) is Screw Kid's partner, and a fellow Perfect Choujin. His special ability is to use his head (attached to one wrist by a chain) as a smashing weapon. In their combination attack he would jump on top of Screw Kid as they came down and use his massive weight to drive Screw Kid's spike deeper into their victims. After losing to Buffaloman and Mongolman, he tried to run away but was caught and killed by Neptuneman. Renamed "Mace" in the Ultimate Muscle dub. He is voiced by Masashi Hirose.

=== Omega Centauri's Six Spears ===
The Omega Centauri's Six Spears are six Choujins hailing from the Omega Centauri. They are the descendants of Choujins who in the distant past had been exiled by The Man and his Perfect Origin. As a result of this, they harbor a deep hatred against him, and to this end, they made a deal with Satan in order to erect barriers around the headquarters of each faction, preventing them from taking action as they invade earth. They have two purposes on earth: to find a power source that could save their dying homeworld, be it Magnet Power or Friendship Power, and to kill The Man and the Perfect Origin in order to enact their vengeance. Omegaman Dexia from the Scramble for the Throne arc was a spy that had been sent by them earlier on, but he had failed his mission due to his untimely death. The Omega Centauri Choujins would fight the non-Idol Justice Choujins at the Sagrada Familia, and would subsequently fight the Five Fated Princes and Kinnikuman at various castles throughout the world.

==== Omegaman Aristera ====
Omegaman Aristera is the leader of the Omega Centauri's Six Spears, and the elder twin brother of Omegaman Dexia, who had been a member of Team Super Phoenix during the Scramble for the Throne arc. Like his brother, his most distinguishing feature is the large hand upon his back, although his is a left hand as opposed to Dexia's right hand. He employs techniques similar to his brother. He faces Kinnikuman Super Phoenix at Azuchi Castle, and he takes a commanding lead as Super Phoenix's techniques is unable to do significant damage to him, although Super Phoenix himself is able to avoid the full brunt of Aristera's moves by using his calculating mind. Eventually, Super Phoenix decides to accept the God of Intelligence to possess him once more, gaining the upper hand.

==== Lunaight ====
Lunaight is a wolf-themed Choujin with a metal jaw. He uses this jaw to tear off the flesh of his opponents. He fights Wolfman at the Sagrada Familia. Lunaight was able to take a large chunk off of Wolfman's left shoulder, but Wolfman continues to fight despite this. As the fight progresses, Lunaight becomes progressively larger and more feral due to the Earth's atmostphere, invoking Bergmann's rule. He was able to constrict Wolfman with his tail, harkening to when the same happened when Wolfman fought Springman, but he was able to break this hold. Wolfman then unlocks Friendship power, but this also allowed Lunaight to do the same, advancing the Omega Centaurians' cause. Wolfman defeats him, and Lunaight leaps off the Sagrada Familia, and despite Wolfman's attempt to save him, he rejects his assistance, opting to fall to his death and impaling himself on a spire.

==== Hailman ====
Hailman is an icy Choujin with ice-related abilities. He is able to turn his arm into ice spikes as well as turn the ring into a sheet of ice, allowing him to skate on it. He fights Teapackman at the Sagrada Familia, where he managed to freeze Teapackman's teabag. Hailman is then able to easily freeze the helpless Teapackman and decapitate him. Subsequently, he fights Kinnikuman Mariposa at Bran Castle. Hailman gains an early lead by freezing the ring and manipulating it to his advantage, but Mariposa was able to counter this by setting himself on fire. Hailman was in turn able to shut down this tactic by trapping Mariposa in an ice coffin, depriving him of oxygen and disabling Mariposa's fire abilities. Eventually, Mariposa uses Hailman's body itself as a magnifying glass to restart his fire, and subsequently defeats Hailman with a refined version of his fake Muscle Revenger. Hailman passes away from his injuries shortly thereafter.

==== Gear Master ====
Gear Master is a mechanical Choujin whose entire torso is made up of large gears. He uses these gears to grind his opponents. At the Sagrada Familia, he fights Benkiman. Despite the latter managing to use his Benki Flush technique on Gear Master, this technique proved ineffective, subsequently escaping and shredding Benkiman with his gears. Afterwards, Gear Master fights Kinnikuman Big Body at the Forbidden City, taunting him as a fake for his shameful performance during the Scramble for the Throne arc. Undaunted, Big Body would grapple with Gear Master, being fairly equal. Gear Master then unveils the Yellow Emperor's Mirror, an ominous chandelier that would crush unworthy candidates to the throne. Eventually, Big Body was able to jam Gear Master's gears with a ball of sand and use his finisher, the Maple Leaf Clutch, against him. The chandelier then falls and crushes Gear Master, as Big Body laments the unfairness of the Gods.

==== Mariquitaman ====
Mariquitaman is a ladybug themed Choujin. He is able to fly with his wings to execute acrobatic maneuvers, and protrude spikes from his back. He faces Curry Cook at the Sagrada Familia. Curry Cook resorted to his usual brutal techniques, in order to prevent Mariquitaman from discovering the secret of Friendship power, but this was to no avail as Mariquitaman was eventually able to slice Curry Cook in half using his wings. He then fights Kinnikuman Zebra at Castel Del Monte's octagonal ring. The two exchange techniques and holds, until Mariquitaman uses his abilities to mimic Zebra and force black Zebra to emerge, in order to make him more predictable. Zebra was eventually able to reconcile his white and black sides, but despite this, his Muscle Inferno remains ineffective, and Mariquitaman defeats him.

==== Pirateman ====
Pirateman, as his name implies, is a burly, pirate-themed Choujin. He fights with a brawling style, as well as powerful holds such as his signature technique, the Saint Elmo's Fire. He also has an ability called Aurora Power, an inferior form of the Perfect Choujins' Magnet Power. He fights Canadianman at the Sagrada Familia, but despite Canadianman's improvement, he was still defeated. Refusing to surrender to Pirateman, this led to Pirateman subsequently executing him. Pirateman then fights Kinnikuman at Swallow's Nest, wishing to draw out Kinnikuman's Friendship Power in order to learn its secrets. However, even with Kinnikuman exhibiting his Burning Inner Strength and a stronger version inspired by his fallen allies, Pirateman deems Friendship Power inadequate, becoming disappointed and soon enraged. Eventually, Kinnikuman's empathy towards the Omega Centaurians' plight unlocks an even stronger power, allowing him to defeat Pirateman and convincing him that it is the power that could save their homeland. In spite of this, he is still unable to abandon his grudge against The Man, which is at odds with the values of this new power. He does admit he will consider attempting discourse towards The Man first, and to convince the other Omega Centaurians to do the same.

=== Choshin ===
==== God of Harmony's Faction ====
===== The One =====
God of Harmony.

===== Rampageman =====
God of Commandments.

===== Bicorn =====
God of Wrath.

===== The Natural =====
God of Tranquillity.

===== Caucasusman =====
God of Discipline. A Caucasus beetle chojin.

===== Ideaman =====
God of Reason.

===== The Notorious =====
God of Madness.

===== The Executioner =====
God of Evolution.

===== Leviathan =====
God of Fortune and Misfortune.

===== Onyxman =====
God of Reformation.

===== The Berserker =====
God of Self-Control.

===== Magnificent =====
God of Insight.

== Supporting characters ==
=== Mayumi Kinniku ===
Mayumi Kinniku (キン肉真弓, Kinniku Mayumi) is Kinnikuman's father and the 57th King of Planet Kinniku. He was also the champion of the ninth and tenth Choujin Olympics. His and his wife Sayuri's negligence was what led to Kinnikuman's accidental abandonment at Earth. He has a fierce and long-standing rivalry with Harabote Muscle, the chairman of the Choujin committee. As a child, he with Harabote had encountered his imprisoned uncle Sadaharu, who encourages him to be a just king. Though usually embarrassed by Kinnikuman's stupid behavior, he is also often one of his loudest supporters. Occasionally, he provides exposition on the Kinniku clan's tradition and techniques to his son. He is usually referred to as Kinniku-Daiō (King Kinniku). He is voiced by Kazuhiko Kishino.

=== Sayuri Kinniku ===
Sayuri Kinniku (キン肉小百合, Kinniku Sayuri) is the mother of Kinnikuman, wife of Mayumi Kinniku, and the 57th Queen of Planet Kinniku. She is usually depicted as a typical long-suffering, loving mother character, but she has been known to transform into a violent fan during her son's matches. In the manga and first anime she is typically referred to as Mama, but in the Throne Arc anime she is called by her real name. In both anime, she was listed in the credits as Queen Kinniku (キン肉王妃, Kinniku Ōhi). By Kinnikuman Nisei she has died, leaving Mayumi a widower. She is voiced by Nana Yamaguchi (Yōko Matsuoka in Kinnikuman: Scramble for the Throne).

=== Mari Nikaido ===
Mari Nikaidō (二階堂マリ, Nikaidō Mari) is a teacher at Suminoe Kindergarten that falls for Kinnikuman. She was the initial object of Kinnikuman's affections, forming a sort of love triangle along with Meat. However, when Bibinba enters the story, she feels overshadowed by her and gives up on Kinnikuman, going overseas to study. In Kinnikuman Nisei, Mari had returned to Japan and has an adopted daughter named Rinko, who is the love interest of Kinniku Mantaro.

=== Natsuko Shono ===
Natsuko Shōno (翔野ナツ子, Shouno Natsuko) is a young reporter for Weekly Hero (週刊HERO, Shūkan HERO) who eventually becomes Terryman's girlfriend. She is almost never seen without her trademark newsboy cap and camera. She is a bit of a tomboy, wearing bellbottoms and a tanktop in earlier chapters and overalls and a sweater from the 20th Choujin Olympics on. At some point before the revival series, she gets into a serious accident, putting Terryman in a dilemma as he is scheduled to fight Kinnikuman the next day. Eventually, she marries Terryman, moving to Terry's ranch in Texas later and becoming the mother of Terry the Kid, a major character in Kinnikuman Nisei. She is voiced by Hiromi Tsuru (Akiko Hiramatsu in Kinnikuman: Scramble for the Throne).

=== Harabote Muscle ===
Harabote Muscle is usually referred to as Iinchō (委員長, Chairman). He is the rival and childhood friend of Mayumi Kinniku. He serves as the chairman of the Choujin Committee (超人委員会, Chōjin Iinkai). He was at one time a Choujin wrestler, having won the 11th Choujin Olympics. As chairman, he oversees all the matches and tournaments that take place within the series and will sometimes serve as referee. Although initially somewhat antagonistic towards Kinnikuman, he begins to respect him as Kinnikuman protects the earth time and time again. In the English adaptation Ultimate Muscle, Harabote is renamed Vance McMadd as a parody of WWE (World Wrestling Entertainment) owner Vince McMahon. He is voiced by Yonehiko Kitagawa in Kinnikuman, Takkou Ishimori in Kinnikuman: Scramble for the Throne, Kenji Nomura in Kinnikuman Nisei and Darren Dunstan in Ultimate Muscle in English dub.

=== Canadianman ===
Canadianman is a Canadian Choujin, patterned after the Canadian flag. Despite his supposed strength surpassing the likes of Ramenman & Robin Mask, he is eliminated early during the 20th Choujin Olympics by the latter, becoming a notable background character ever since along with his best friend, Specialman. He and Specialman has gained infamy for their constant losses, such as when they formed a tag team during the Dream Choujin Tag tournament before their entry was stolen by Ashuraman and Sunshine. In the True Devil Choujin arc, he attempts to redeem himself by facing Pirateman, and despite his intensive training to learn more technical moves as well as his Rebuilt Canadian Backbreaker, he was still humiliated & broken in half by Pirateman's Saint Elmo's Fire while constantly begging for forgiveness.

=== Specialman ===
Specialman is a Choujin in the form of an American football player, hailing from the northern part of the United States. At first he is portrayed as one of the top-label Choujins in the world, but he is easily eliminated in the 20th Choujin Olympics by Kinkotsuman's scheme. Afterwards, he becomes one of the more notable background characters along with his best friend, Canadianman. He and Canadianman has gained infamy for their constant losses, such as when they formed a tag team during the Dream Choujin Tag tournament before their entry was stolen by Ashuraman and Sunshine.

=== Curry Cook ===
Curry Cook (カレクック) is a brutal Indian Choujin who fought Kinnikuman. He employs violent techniques, and uses the curry roux from the plate upon his head to harm his opponents. A side story published between the end of the original run and the revival series delves into Curry Cook's backstory. Originally known as Singh, he was rejected from being the successor of the Mala wrestling style due to his violent tendencies, being commanded to go on a non-violent year-long sabbatical. However, he ends this pact a day early, in order to save a village oppressed by a tyrannical British Raj ruler, becoming ostracized due to his brutality and adopting the name Curry Cook. In the Perfect Origin arc, he attacks Strong the Budo, who turns him into a regular human being. Curry Cook returns in the True Devil Choujin arc as a Choujin once more, where he resorts to his violent wrestling style against Mariquitaman in order to prevent the Omega Centaurians from discovering the secret of Friendship power. This proved ineffective, due to Curry Cook's fury not being genuine, and Mariquitaman would bisect him using his wings. He is voiced by Masaharu Satou.

=== Alisa Mackintosh ===
Alisa Mackintosh (アリサ・マッキントッシュ) is Robin Mask's wife, and eventually Kevin Mask's mother. She is depicted as a loyal wife, standing by her husband's side even despite the protests of her family in marrying a Choujin wrestler, and even when Robin Mask becomes vengeful towards Kinnikuman. She was seriously injured by the Time Choujins in the Ultimate Tag arc of Kinnikuman Nisei, and healing her was a driving factor for Robin Mask and the time-displaced New Generation Justice Choujins to win the Ultimate tag tournament. She is voiced by Chisato Nakajima

=== Jesse Maivia ===
Jesse Maivia (ジェシー・メイビア) is a champion of the Hawaiian Choujin world and a master of reversals. He is incredibly adept and reversing the techniques of his opponents, being able to defeat Prince Kamehame by doing so in order to become the Hawaiian champion. However, he grew arrogant, never learning his own original techniques, and this led to his loss to Kinnikuman, though he eventually regains the belt from Prince Kamehame. By the time of the Scramble for the Throne arc, Jesse Maivia has humbled, becoming a more level-headed character. His name comes from Peter Maivia, the grandfather of The Rock. His voice actor is Ryōichi Tanaka.

=== Bibinba ===
Bibinba is the primary love interest of Kinnikuman. Portrayed as very attractive, she is part of a rival tribe to the Kinniku clan, having been raised by her father to assassinate Kinnikuman. However, Kinnikuman would inadvertently help her time and time again, leading to her falling in love with him and travelling back with him to earth. She tries to be useful for Kinnikuman by doing housework and cooking for him, but Kinnikuman sees her as a nuisance due to Meat having done such tasks before her arrival. Spurned, she joins the Earth Defense Force, disappearing for a while. She returns in the Scramble for the Throne arc, where her face was damaged, although this was fixed by Kinnikuman's Face Flash. At the end of the arc, she marries Kinnikuman to become the 58th Queen of Planet Kinniku. Her name is Japanese for bibimbap. She is renamed Belinda Muscle in the English-language Ultimate Muscle. She is voiced by Michie Tomizawa.

=== Pentagon ===
Pentagon (ペンタゴン) is an angelic Choujin, possessing white, bird-like wings used for his trademark aerial attacks. Another distinguishing feature is the five-pointed star polygon drawn on his face, which he can turn upside down to manipulate space-time, such as switching places with his opponent or stopping time. Warsman mutilates him in their match at the 21st Choujin Olympics, but he returns later in the Dream Choujin Tag arc, teaming up with his cousin, the Devil Choujin Black Hole. Later, he reappears to assist Black Hole as he was fighting Jack Faucet, manifesting from his body and damaging Jack Faucet, before reverting to Black Hole. His voice actor is Kouji Totani in Kinnikuman (ep. 32), and Hideyuki Tanaka in Kinnikuman (ep. 33 and on).

=== Benkiman ===
Benkiman (ベンキマン) is a squat toilet Choujin (benki is Japanese for toilet). His torso takes the form of a squat toilet, and he wears a coil representing feces for a hat. His feared signature technique involves rolling up his opponent into a compressed ball, and subsequently flushing them down. He faces Kinnikuman in the 21st Choujin Olympics, but is defeated when Kinnikuman clogs him using his shorts. A side story explores his backstory, where he is portrayed as an amnesiac named Heladoman, until he is told of his heritage before the Peruvian qualifiers for the 21st Choujin Olympics, where he then embraces his original identity, Benkiman. In the Perfect Origin arc, he attacks Strong the Budo, who turns him into a regular human being. He returns as a Choujin in the True Devil Choujin arc, where he fights Gear Master. He is defeated when his Benki Flush did not work properly against him, and he is subsequently shredded. He is voiced by Issei Futamata, and Takumi Yamazaki in Kinnikuman Nisei.

=== Teapackman ===
A Choujin with a teacup for a head. He uses a gigantic teapack as a whip when he fights. In the 21st Choujin Olympics, he fights and is decapitated by Warsman, who subsequently drinks from his teacup head. He is revived offscreen and eventually returns in the True Devil Choujin arc, being dramatically more muscular and having trained his neck to avoid the embarrassment of having another drink from him again. Though strangely, his strength did not change at all. He fights Hailman, who is able to freeze and destroy Teapackman's teapack whip, severely hindering his fighting capability. Hailman subsequently freezes Teapackman's head, allowing him to easily snap off Teapackman's head.

=== Tatsunori Kinniku ===
Tatsunori Kinniku (キン肉タツノリ, Kinniku Tatsunori) is the 56th King of Planet Kinniku, being the father of Mayumi Kinniku. A posthumous character who never directly appears in the series, he was a kind and just king who espoused the ideals of mercy. At one point, he was kidnapped by evil Choujins, where he was tortured for three days straight. He was able to endure this by using the Muscle Curtain, a defensive technique passed down in the Kinniku clan, after which his assailants collapsed due to fatigue. In the Perfect Origin arc, it is revealed that this story is a half-truth; in fact, his kidnappers had been dissenters in the Kinniku clan's royal court that was attempting a coup against Tatsunori. It is further explained that Tatsunori's rule had been a tumultuous one. as he had spent a lot of his reign eliminating the corrupt elements of his administration. This incident was the catalyst of Nemesis losing faith in the Kinniku clan. Tatsunori's name comes from Tatsunori Hara. He is voiced by Akira Kamiya.

=== Doctor Bombe ===
Doctor Bombe (ドクター・ボンベ) is a doctor who specializes in Choujins. He created Ramenman's Mongol Mask, allowing him to function even with his debilitating head trauma. During the Dream Choujin Tag arc, he repairs Kinnikuman's severed arm using Buffaloman's long horns, but he dies shortly after, joining his old friend Prince Kamehame. He returns in the Scramble for the Throne arc to resurrect Warsman from the afterlife by providing him with an artificial heart, though due to an oversight, Warsman was at first revived without his memories. He is voiced by Masaharu Satō, and Takkō Ishimori in the Scramble for the Throne anime.

== Kaiju ==
In the earlier parts of the series where it was more of a superhero parody, Kinnikuman and the other Choujins are responsible for fighting Kaijus, giant monsters who terrorize and destroy Japan and other countries, as well as generally cause mischief.

=== Kinkotsuman ===
Kinkotsuman (キン骨マン; lit. Bone-and-tendon Man) (renamed "Skullduggery" in the English dub of Kinnikuman Nisei) is a skeleton-themed alien who comes from the planet Dokuro-sei (ドクロ星; lit. Planet Skull). He acts as the primary antagonist for Kinnikuman in the earliest parts of the manga, being his villainous foil. Although he often comes up with schemes to defeat Kinnikuman, his general incompetence often meant these schemes fail. He befriends Iwao, who acts as a sort of sidekick to Kinkotsuman. During the 20th Choujin Olympics, he sabotages various Choujins, and he attempt to shoot Kinnikuman, which was only foiled due to Terryman taking the bullet for Kinnikuman (this later led to Terryman's amputation). After the American Tour arc in the manga, he, and Kaiju in general, disappears from the series, although he remains as a background character and occasional comedic relief in the anime. He is voiced by Issei Futamata.

=== First Kaijū Extermination Arc ===
- Okamaras (オカマラス) is a purple dinosaur Kaijū who first appears as the antagonist of the first pilot chapter. He later reappears in the first serialized chapter as one of the invading aliens and again as one of Kinkotsuman's minions. He appears to have a slight crush on Kinnikuman. His feelings for Kinnikuman lead him to allow Kinnikuman to escape from Kinkotsuman's prison. He is voiced by Sanji Hase.
- Eraginess (エラギネス) is a lizard Kaijū who first appears as the antagonist of the second pilot chapter. He later reappears in the first serialized chapter as one of the invading aliens and again as one of Kinkotsuman's minions. He is voiced by Kouji Totani.
- Abdullah (アブドーラ) is a Kaijū based on Abdullah the Butcher who first appears in the first serialized chapter as one of the invading aliens. He later reappears attacking the Japanese Diet building when Terryman first appears. He and Mouko-Seijin later team up to fight Kinnikuman and Terryman in a tag match to decide who is better between Choujin and Kaijū. In the anime he is renamed Abdudullah (アブドドーラ), and the one that appears after Terryman defeats the first one is said to be Abududullah Jr.
- Acrobat-seijin (アクロバット星人 Acrobat Alien) is an acrobat Kaijū who first appears in the first serialized chapter as one of the invading aliens. Kinnikuman claims the best defense against his acrobatic moves is finger pops. A character resembling Acrobat-seijin appears in Kinnikuman Nisei: Ultimate Choujin Tag Arc among the pile of tag teams killed by the Time Choujins, but it is unknown whether or not it is him.
- Gorizaemon (ゴリザエモン) is a gorilla Kaijū whose specialty is making his nose drip on command. Kinnikuman hires him to kidnap pop idol Nana Takahara so Kinnikuman can save her and win her over, but he falls for Nana and fights back. Kinnikuman eventually defeats him. He has a sister named Gonta. He is voiced by Kazuhiko Kishino.
- Nessie (ネッシー) is the legendary mysterious creature that dwells in Loch Ness. When Kinnikuman first hears of her and that she is believed to be 20 meters tall (shorter than his giant form), he decides challenge her to a fight on live TV. Unfortunately, she turns out to be much larger than his giant form and defeats him with a mere lick on the cheek. In the anime, she first plays around with him before knocking him into space. When Kinnikuman gets a garlic boost from Meat and tries to fight back, she ends up swallowing him and then later pooping him out as she leaves.
- Shiek-seijin (シーク星人 Alien Shiek) is a sheikh Kaijū who first appears in the first serialized chapter as one of the invading aliens. He later reappears and attacks Tokyo, prompting Kinnikuman to go off and fight him despite not being Japan's official hero anymore. This in turn prompts Terryman to quite his businesslike ways and fight purely for the sake of justice. He is voiced by Kazuhiko Kishino.
- Franky (フランキー) is a Kaijū who kidnaps two of Mari's students. Kinnikuman tries to save them, but they prefer Franky and refuse to be saved. This comically results in Franky having to protect the children from an angry Kinnikuman. Before he can make his mother proud by becoming the first popular Kaijū, Meat lures the children away with chocolate and defeats Franky. He is voiced by Tetsuo Mizutori.
- Zangyaku-seijin (ザンギャク星人 Brutal Alien) is an alien whose father was killed by Kinnikuman while trying to take over the Earth. He has a gun for a hand and speaks with a Kyūshū dialect. He hijacks a bus with Kinnikuman, Meat, Mari, and the school children and demands to fight Kinnikuman. Kinnikuman refuses until he lets the children and Mari go (Meat stays behind on his own accord). He is defeated when Kinnikuman's Kinniku Flash causes the bus to explode. Kinnikuman gets good press over this fight (the headlines reading "Kinnikuman Miraculously Saves the Day"), but the children are ungrateful because they have to walk to school now thanks to him. His appearance also marks the debut of Detective Akaiwa (Gobugari in the anime). In the anime, he appears with Nachiguron as his minion during the 20th Choujin Olympics. He is voiced by Daisuke Gouri.
- Kappatron (カッパトロン) is a Kappa Kaijū who attacks Tokyo while Natsuko is interviewing Kinnikuman. He is ultimately defeated by Terryman because Kinnikuman wasted time reminding Natsuko to take pictures. It could be said that Kappatron played an important role in Terry and Natsuko's relationship, as his rampage provided them with a chance to meet. He was also the first fan submission Kaijū. He is voiced by Kouji Totani.
- Daibutsura (ダイブツラー) is a Daibutsu Kaijū who lives in the ocean. Once every 50 years, he rises from the ocean and abducts beautiful women in order to peek at their vulva. He is defeated by Kinnikuman's Yoshinoya Kinniku Flash.
- Dai King (ダイキング Great King) is a vampiric Kaijū who kidnaps citizens of Planet Kinniku in order to fight Kinnikuman. He learns of Kinnikuman's weakness to milk and uses it to his advantage. Kinnikuman eventually gets a garlic boost from Meat's sister Rare and defeats him.
- Mouko-seijin (猛虎星人 Fierce Tiger Alien) is a saber-wielding Kaijū modeled after Tiger Jeet Singh who teams up with Abdullah to fight Kinnikuman and Terryman in a tag match to decide who is better between Choujin and Kaijū. Kinnikuman defeats him with a Back Drop. A character with the name Mouko-seijin appears in the first Kinnikuman movie, although he looks entirely different. He is voiced by Kouji Yada.
- Sokonashi-seijin (底無し星人 Bottomless Alien) is an alien who devours everything in his path, including Kinnikuman and Natsuko. Kinnikuman eventually escapes after cutting Sokonashi-seijin's stomach open with his Kinniku Cutter. He later reappears as one of Kinkotsuman's minions.
- Long Legged Gon (長足ゴン Nagaashi Gon) is a Kaijū who has been harmlessly running around the world since ancient times. However, Kinnikuman has to stop him before he runs into a dam, causing massive damage. Knocked down by Kinnikuman, he is unable to stand back up because his arms are too small and he dies after three days. This tragic event causes Kinnikuman to appreciate jogging more.
- Apollo the Giant (アポロ・ザ・ジャイアント) is a boxing Kaijū who easily defeats Kinnikuman. Kinnikuman receives training from a delusional Yosaku-san, who had been watching Rocky one too many times, and challenges him again. Kinnikuman manages to defeat him at the very last minute, resulting in several gym owners wanting Yosaku to train their boxers. He was named after Apollo Creed and modeled after André the Giant.
- Iwao (イワオ) (Rocky Slabb in the English dub of Nisei) is a rock Kaijū who first appears at an amusement park and is subsequently defeated by Kinnikuman. He returns when Kinnikuman is being interviewed by Natsuko and plans to beat him up in front of her and ruin his image. His first attempt is interrupted by Kappatron so he tries to take Natsuko hostage, but he is still easily defeated by Kinnikuman. He then takes on the role of Kinkotsuman's sidekick and helps him with all of his attempts to destroy Kinnikuman. They seemingly turn good after the Choujin Olympics, but return as villains during the American Tag Tournament. In the anime, the two of them eventually join up with Detective Gobugari and act as Kinnikuman's main cheering squad. In Ultimate Muscle, he was renamed Rocky Slabb. Iwao is not that bright and frequently copies Kinkotsuman's laugh and speech pattern. For example, he frequently says dawasa (だわさ) (which Kinkotsuman often ends his sentences with) as a single sentence, seemingly meaning "I agree". This annoys Kinkotsuman and often prompts him to bop Iwao on the head. Iwao also refers to Kinkotsuman as sensei. He is voiced by Masaharu Satou in Kinnikuman, and Yasuhiko Kawazu in Kinnikuman: Scramble for the Throne
- Nachiguron (ナチグロン) is a weak Kaijū that is afraid of humans. Kinnikuman is dispatched to fight him, but realizes Nachiguron is harmless and lets him go. Originally 60 m tall, he shrinks down to around 1 m and moves in with Kinnikuman and Meat. Meat initially objects to the idea, already having to take care of one big baby (Kinnikuman), but agrees if Nachiguron will take care of himself. He gives Nachiguron a special whistle to blow if he ever gets in trouble and sends him out to get the groceries. Nachiguron is then confronted by the Kaijū Yakuza for siding with Kinnikuman. He almost blows the whistle, but instead decides to take care of himself. He shows up again from time to time cheering on Kinnikuman or serving as referee, but is not seen again after the Choujin Olympics. In the anime however, he first appears during the Choujin Olympics as Zangyaku-seijin's cowardly minion, but eventually sides with Kinnikuman. He then takes on the role of Kinnikuman's second sidekick and is frequently seen with Meat throughout the rest of the anime. Nachiguron is bald when he first appears, but in the next chapter he has shaggy blonde hair which is his hairstyle for the remainder of the series. In addition to his cowardice, he is also a very loud snorer. He is named after the Nachiguro stones. He is voiced by Keiko Yamamoto in Kinnikuman, and Naomi Nagasawa in Kinnikuman: Scramble for the Throne.

=== Second Kaijū Extermination Arc ===
- Burugorasu (ブルゴラス) is a Kaijū who attacks Japan while Kinnikuman is still touring America. Kinnikuman is allowed only thirty minutes to go to Japan and defeat him, if he cannot get back in time he has to return the Choujin Olympic title. In the end, he defeats Burugorasu but does not make it back in time.
- Monster Turkey (モンスター・ターキー) is, as his name suggests, a turkey Kaijū who attacks on Christmas. Kinnikuman and the Tanokin Trio argue over who will fight it. It is eventually defeated by Kinnikuman.
- Gonta (ゴンタ) is a female gorilla Kaijū who tries to attack Bibinba, but is easily defeated by Kinnikuman. She is the sister of Gorizaemon.

==== Kinkotsuman's Minions ====
- Sprinterzord (スプリンタソード) is a robotic Kaijū that Kinkotsuman uses to attack an already weakened Kinnikuman. He had four legs and a serpent-like drill on his head. He is destroyed by Terryman's Magnum Gun attack, allowing Kinnikuman to focus on beating Kinkotsuman. In the anime he is renamed Neck Flinger (クビフリンガー Kubi Furingā).
- Tendon (テンドン) is a shrimp who is transformed into a Kaijū by Kinkotsuman and Iwao. He and his girlfriend Ebiko used to be part of a bowl of Tendon, but Kinnikuman was repulsed by it and instead threw Ebiko into the ground and smacked Tendon out of the house. Iwao found Tendon and gave him to Kinkotsuman, who used Tendon' desire for revenge to convince him to become a Kaijū. Tendon goes on a rampage until Kinnikuman defeats him, agreeing to eat him afterwards as a final request. Kinnikuman likes how Tendon tastes so much that he begins eating Tendon everyday instead of Gyūdon (by the next chapter, though, he's back to only gyuudon). He is voiced by Kouji Totani.
- Bazoogara (バズーガーラー) is a Kaijū with bazookas (filled with Morinaga milk, Kinnikuman's weakness) on his back that Kinkotsuman uses to attack Kinnikuman and Terryman while giant/possessed Natsuko is on a rampage. Terry eventually subdues Natsuko long enough for Kinnikuman to destroy Bazoogara.

==== Roots Island ====
- Ukon (ウコン) is an ape Kaijū who appears as the main antagonist during the Roots Island story. He turns out to actually be a robot piloted by Kinkotsuman and Iwao. He initially defeats Kinnikuman and takes over Roots Island, but Kinnikuman returns to fight him again. He is eventually destroyed by Mammora, and when Kinkotsuman and Iwao crawl out of the robot head Kinnikuman yells at them and scares them away. Characters named Ukon, very few of which have any simian features, appear in all of the Kinnikuman movies as minions of the film's antagonist. The running joke in the movies is that Kinnikuman always mishears his name as "Unko (うんこ poop)", resulting in several poo jokes. He is voiced by Kouzou Shioya (movie 1); Kouji Yada (movie 2); Yudetamago (movies 3~6); Masaharu Satou (movie 7).
- Octopus Dragon (オクトパスドラゴン) is an octopus Kaijū who Kinnikuman fights and defeats. A character named Octopus Dragon III appears as the main antagonist of the first Kinnikuman movie, but he possess an entirely different appearance and personality. However, the monster in the film, Gigasaurus (ギガサウルス), does resemble the original Octopus Dragon. He is voiced by Chikao Ohtsuka (movie 1).
- Harigorasu (ハリゴラス) is a Kaijū who Terryman fights and defeats. His body was spiny like a hedgehog and he would curl up into a ball and attack his opponent with his body. A character with the name Harigorasu appears in the first Kinnikuman movie and fights Rikishiman, although he looks entirely different. He is voiced by Yasurō Tanaka.
- Mammora (マンモラー Manmora) is a sacred mammoth Kaijū who helps Kinnikuman defeat Ukon. His name is a parody Mothra.
- Miss Karasu (ミスカラス) is a bird-type Kaijū (karasu is Japanese for crow) who transports Kunta, Kinnikuman, Meat, and Terryman to Roots Island.

== Minor characters ==
- Kazuo Nakano is a frequent background character who serves as the color commentator in the anime. He was actually a parody of the assistant editor of Weekly Shōnen Jump at that time. He is usually referred to as Nakano-san. He is voiced by Sanji Hase.
- Yosaku is a guy who often pops up wherever there is a TV camera, doing an impromptu naked fan dance. In the anime he is known for appearing just about anywhere and performing numerous jobs, most notably working at Kinnikuman's favorite gyuudon place. He also will often fill in as announcer with Nakano-san. He appears frequently throughout the series as several different character, including Bibinba's father Horumon Yāki, and had a longer tenure than the more recognizable Nakano-san. An elderly Yosaku makes a cameo appearance in Kinnikuman Nisei. His nickname is Be Anywhere Do Anything Yosaku-san (何処にでも出てきて何にでもなる与作さん, Doko ni demo Detekite Nani ni demo naru Yosaku-san). He is voiced by Tetsuo Mizutori.
- Detective Akaiwa (赤岩刑事, Akaiwa-keiji) is a Jōsai District Police Inspector. When there is trouble, he and his men will often show up with machine guns blazing and then leave without actually solving anything. In the manga he only appears in two stories, but in the anime he is renamed Gobugari (五分刈 "close haircut"), Police Inspector of the West Sumidagawa Station and appears frequently. He is a parody of Tetsuya Watari's cop character Raisuke Kuroiwa from the TV series Daitokai.
- Don Piccadillicaoné (ドン・ピカーデリカオーネ) is a short bald mustachioed man. He has a very active imagination and will sometimes try to get involved with the fights. He originally appears as the chief of the Earth Defense Force, but appears again during Kinnikuman's fight with Curry Cook during the Choujin Olympics as a fan eating gyuudon. He appears twice as a doctor: first during the American Tour Arc as the doctor who takes care of Robert, and then during the Seven Devil Choujin Arc as the doctor who tells Kinnikuman to rest for a few days. He is voiced by Kazuhiko Kishino.
- King Tōn (キング・トーン) is a pig. When Suguru was a baby, the Kinniku family was flying in space. A pig in the ship was causing a commotion, and Mayumi mistakenly threw Suguru out of the ship to Earth. The pig, Ikue, was mistakenly raised as prince in place of Suguru. It became known as King Tōn (Pork) and took over Kinniku Planet. Although he managed to defeat Kinnikuman, a butcher who was King Ton's original owner arrives and chases King Ton away. He is voiced by Issei Futamata.
- Gōriki (ゴーリキ) was a member of the Kinniku clan who came along with Meat to retrieve Kinnikuman. If Suguru could beat Gōriki in a Steel Cage Match, he could stay on Earth. He was about to beat Suguru when he suddenly noticed the goofy faces Suguru was making while in pain and began laughing uncontrollably on the ground. He tossed and turned so much that he broke his spine, allowing Suguru the win (it did not matter anyway because the next day Meat offered Kinnikuman a gyuudon if he came home so he agreed). He is voiced by Kazuhiko Kishino.
- Kimiko Nakano (中野公子, Nakano Kimiko) is Kazuo's wife. In the manga Kazuo will often try to sell her off, but in the anime he had a cloyingly loving relationship with her. She is voiced by Nana Yamaguchi.
- Kazuhiko Torishima (鳥嶋和彦, Torishima Kazuhiko) is another frequent background character and parody of Kazuhiko Torishima, an editor of Weekly Shōnen Jump. He is usually referred to as Mayuusu no Torishima (マユうすの鳥嶋; "Thin Eyebrows" Torishima).
- Pandaman (パンダマン) is the hero of a popular children's TV series. Kinnikuman mistook him as a real Choujin at an amusement park and challenged him. Much later in 1998, Eiichiro Oda created a gag profile for an unrelated Choujin also called Pandaman for the tribute book Kinnikuman 77 Mysteries. He later used him as a recurring background character in his own manga series One Piece. He appeared as a hidden character in the game Kinnikuman Nisei: New Generation vs Legends. However, Oda's character has never appeared in any Kinnikuman manga or anime stories.
- Kunta (クンタ) is the princess of Roots Island. When all of the soldiers on her island are killed by Ukon, Octopus Dragon, and Harigorasu, she enlists the aide of Kinnikuman and Terryman. Meat refers to her as Irresponsible Princess (いいかげんな王女, Iikagen na Oujou).
- Brockenman (ブロッケンマン) is a brutal Nazi Choujin with aspirations of world domination. He was ripped in half by Ramenman. His death was very gruesome and in a way set the tone for some of the more important fights in how violent they could/would be. His name comes from The Brocken. Brockenman is also known for being the father of Brocken Jr, and his death inspired Brocken Jr.'s ire towards Ramenman. He is voiced by Tetsuo Mizutori.
- Skyman (スカイマン) is a Mexican luchador Choujin. He fought and lost to Terryman in the first round of the 20th Olympics. Parody of Mil Máscaras. He is voiced by Issei Futamata.
- Kani Base (カニベース) is a crab Choujin the 20th Choujin Olympics preliminaries, the fighters had to participate in a game of janken (Rock, Paper, Scissors). Kinnikuman took on Kani Base who because he had pincers for hands could only choose scissors, leading to Kinnikuman choosing rock to beat him. Before the 21st Olympics, he had his pincers altered to hands and lost again when Kinnikuman chose scissors. Friends with Kinkotsuman and Iwao. He was named Buster Crabb in Ultimate Muscle. Voiced by Sanji Hase, Eiji Takemoto (Kinnikuman Nisei).
- Kintaman (キンターマン) is a competitor in the 20th Choujin Olympics. In the anime he was called "Kuntaman" so not to sound like kintama (testicles). He is voiced by Yonehiko Kitagawa.
- Sphinxman (スフィンクスマン) is a Sphinx Choujin who was a competitor in the 20th Choujin Olympics. He is voiced by Kazuhiko Kishino.
- Lupin (ルピーン) is a competitor in the 20th Choujin Olympics. A parody of Arsene Lupin.
- Copper Bellman (銅ベルマン, Dō Beruman) is a dōtaku Choujin and competitor in the 20th Choujin Olympics. Eliminated in the battle royal. His shield has the periodic table copper symbol Cu on it.
- Zorroman (ゾローマン) is a competitor in the 20th Choujin Olympics. Parody of Zorro.
- Amazonman (アマゾンマン) is a competitor in the 20th Choujin Olympics. Eliminated in the battle royal. Originally portrayed with a skull on his forehead and a bone through is nose, this depiction was ruled a politically incorrect depiction of indigenous people and has been changed in recent printings.
- Vikingman (バイキングマン) is a Viking Choujin who only appeared in the anime.
- White Bearman (ホワイトベアマン) is a Polar bear Choujin who only appeared in the anime.
- Yetiman (雪男マン, Yukiotokoman) is a Yeti Choujin who only appeared in the anime.
- Announcer Yoshigai (吉貝アナウンサー, Yoshigai Anaunsā) is an announcer. Wherever there is a wrestling match, Yoshigai is there as the Play-by-play. Theme Song: "Moero! Housou Seki (Burning Announcer's Chair)" by Takayuki Miyauchi. He is voiced by Kouji Totani, Masato Hirano (Kinnikuman: Scramble for the Throne), Mahito Ohba (Kinnikuman Nisei).
- Hiroshi Tazahama (タザハマ・ヒロシ, Tazahama Hiroshi) is a color commentator in the manga. Parody of the late JWA and AJPW commentator Hiroshi Tazuhama (田鶴浜弘). In the anime, he is replaced by Nakano-san.
- Red Shoes Man (レッドシューズマン) is the Choujin Olympic Referee. He is voiced by Issei Futamata.
- Gagne Mask (ガニアマスク) is Robin Mask's trainer. Parody of Verne Gagne. Has "AWA" on his forehead. He is voiced by Masaharu Satou.
- Sheik Seijin (シーク星人) is the World Supermen Federation (世界超人同盟, Sekai Chōjin Dōmei) (WSF) Chairman. A parody of Ed "The Sheik" Farhat. A kaiju also named Shiek Seijin appeared earlier (riding a Tauntaun in the anime); it is not clear if they are the same person. In the anime he is depicted as Edith Harrison's minion. He is voiced by Kazuhiko Kishino.
- God Von Erich (ゴッド・フォン・エリック) is the founder of the American Choujin World. A parody of Fritz Von Erich.
- Dynamite Piper (ダイナマイトパイパー) is a young Choujin who fought and lost to Robin Mask during the American Tour. Named after Roddy Piper. He is voiced by Kazuhiko Kishino.
- Skull Boze is Devil Magician's tag team partner. He and Devil Magician used ways to cheat by using weapons during their fight against Beauty Rhodes and Jean Steamboat. He and Devil Magician were defeated by Kinnikuman and Terryman. Parody of Skull Murphy
- Devil Magician is Skull Boze's tag team partner. He and Skull Bozu would cheat by using weapons during the fight against Beauty Rhodes and Jean Steamboat. He and Skull Bozu were defeated by Kinnikuman and Terryman.
- Shishkeba Boo (シシカバ・ブー) is a member of the Barbecue Clan (バーベキュー族, Baabekyuu-zoku). The champion of the Galactic Choujin Carnival, he agrees to kill Kinnikuman for Horumon Yaki in exchange for Bibinba's hand in marriage. He defeats Kinnikuman and almost kills him (in the anime film they are equal), but after seeing how deeply Bibinba cares for him he backs away like a man. Although very manly and strong, he has a quite homely face, even funnier looking than Kinnikuman's. He is voiced by Keiichi Noda, Mahito Ōba (Nisei).
- Horumon Yaki (ホルモンヤーキ) is the head of the Horumon Clan and one of many roles played by Yosaku. Long ago, the Horumon Clan was greater than the Kinniku clan, but war with the Kinniku clan lead to its downfall. Horumon himself has challenged and lost to Mayumi Kinniku countless times, and his wife Harami was killed by the Kinniku Clan. In order to seek revenge on the Kinniku Clan, he sends his daughter Bibinba and Shishkeba Boo of the Barbecue Clan as assassins, but both of them fail. In Kinnikuman Nisei he appears as one of four great elders of Planet Kinniku's Chōjin Council (超人評議会). He seems to have reconciled since Bibinba married into the Kinniku Clan. His name comes from horumonyaki. He is voiced by Jōji Yanami.
- Chienowaman (チエの輪マン) is a disentanglement puzzle Choujin. Motto is: "Modern toys are no match for me". Cubeman literally took him apart in the first round. He was renamed "Mindpuzzler" in Ultimate Muscle where he was depicted as one of the Legends alongside King Cobra and Pentagon. He is voiced by Kazuhiko Kishino.
- Tileman (タイルマン) is a tile Choujin. Defeated in the qualifying round by the Fishers, he, along with several other lesser Choujins who had failed to qualify, was given another chance at participation in the tournament by taking part in a demonstration to touch Benkiman. He thought that as he was so large, he could not be flushed by the toilet Choujin. He was shot out when Kinnikuman made Benkiman's plumbing back up. He is voiced by Masaharu Satou.
- The Kinniku Clan Ancestor (キン肉族先祖, Kinniku-zoku Senzo) is, as his name implies, the great ancestor of the Kinniku Clan. The character "祖" is written on his forehead and his face greatly resembles Tatsunori's. While washing his alternate mask in a river one day, he accidentally dropped it. As he raced after it, Kami-sama appeared and asked, "The Golden Mask or this Worn Out Mask, which did you drop?" He tried to point at the Golden Mask, but neuralgia caused him to accidentally point at his own mask. Kami-sama mistakes this for honesty and rewards him with the Golden and Silver Masks. He is voiced by Masaharu Satō.
- Uldraman (ウルドラマン) is the 18th Choujin Olympics Champion. He is very prideful and was once Japan's main Choujin, but he retires after a humiliating defeat at the hands of Robin Mask at the 19th Olympics (according to a flashback in Kinnikuman Nisei, his hip is broken in half by Robin's Tower Bridge, ending his career). Despite seeming to be a big wheel Choujin, he is never seen after this (excluding the flashback). He was originally called (and meant to be) Ultraman, but this was later changed for copyright reasons. In the anime his name was Uttraman (ウットラマン).
- Shigeru-kun (シゲルくん) was a young man of the Giant Clan who the Royal Kinniku Family adopted to replace the less impressive Kinnikuman. He is later said to have been "adopted" into the Tiger Clan of Planet Tigers. However, he never appears after this. His name comes from former professional baseball player Shigeru Kobayashi, and his adoption itself is a parody of the Suguru Egawa Incident. In the anime he is replaced by Tatsunori-kun (タツノリくん), who is modeled after Tatsunori Hara.
- Medium Rare (ミディアム・レアー) is Meat's very beautiful older sister. Her fiancé Salami is held hostage by Dai King, but with her help Kinnikuman rescues him. In Kinnikuman Nisei her name is written as Rare Alexandria (アレキサンドリア・レアー, Alexandria Rare).
- Salami (サラミ) is Rare's fiancé who is held hostage by Dai King and saved by Kinnikuman. He is seen again with Rare when Kinnikuman almost visits home after the Choujin Olympics. It is unknown if they ever got married.
- Kalbi Liver (カルビ・レバー) is Meat's fat and ugly older sister. In Kinnikuman Nisei her name is written as Liver Alexandria (アレキサンドリア・レバー, Alexandria Liver).
- Beansman (ビーンズマン) is a disciple of Ingen and a young boy from Planet Rakka (ラッカ星, Rakka-sei), a parody on rakkasei, the Japanese word for peanut. When Planet Rakka is invaded by the Uchuu Nobushi, he heads for Earth in order to gather Choujin like Terryman for help. He collects kaijū and carries around one named Monster #1. At the end of the anime television Special, he becomes the Medaka Prince of Planet Goldfish (キンギョ星のメダカ王子, Kingyo-sei no Medaka Ouji). He is voiced by Satomi Majima.
- Ingen (インゲン) is the great elder of Planet Rakka. In order to combat the Uchuu Nobushi invasion, he sends Beansman to Earth to find Seigi Choujin. He seems to be somewhat immortal, as he survives having an arrow pierce his head and is also rather clam with it still in his head. He is voiced by Jōji Yanami.
- The Uchuu Nobushi (宇宙野武士, Space Samurai) are a group of invaders who attack Planet Rakka. The only reason they pause from fighting is to eat. After Crystalman finds the weakness to their Combine and Enlarge technique, they are destroyed by Kinnikuman and the Choujin Team. In the TV Special, the actual leader is identified and named Black King (ブラックキング).
- Puri-Puri Man (プリプリマン; Monsieur Cheeks in the English dub) is one of the few characters from Kinnikuman to not have a M.U.S.C.L.E. or Kinkeshi figure. Puri-Puri Man (literally "angry smelly man") appeared in one panel of the manga when Buffaloman's Devil Choujin attacked Kinnikuman. He also appears twice during the original opening of the Kinnikuman anime. His name appeared as the 51st place in the train tossing event in the original Kinnikuman manga; this may indicate that he was not actually one of the Devil Choujin.

== Anime-original characters ==
Kinnikuman characters

The following are the Kinnikuman anime original characters. Excluded are characters who only appear in movies, as they are listed on the page for the movie in which they appear.

- Kinkotsu-Obaba (キン骨オババ, Auntie Kinkotsu) is Kinkotsuman's aunt (on his mother's side) and an anime original character. Along with her nephew and Iwao, she was originally from the Heinous Choujin planet (like herself, this plot device only appears in the anime). She has the characters Obaba (オババ) written on her forehead. She likes to watch far away matches on her crystal ball and possess the ability to warp people to other places (in the movie Hour of Triumph! Seigi Choujin, she also seems to possess the ability of time travel). She likes to flirt with hunky men, particularly Detective Gobugari. He is voiced by Keiko Yamamoto.

=== Dream Choujin Tag Arc ===
- Elder Cementos (セメントス長老, Sementosu-chourou) is an elite and orthodox Seigi Choujin. At one time, he had planned for Neptuneman to be his successor. He suddenly appears in Pyramid Ring to watch the finals match. He loves to use the microphone and dislikes having to snatch it away from other people. He is voiced by Sanji Hase.
- The Queen of Heaven (天の女王, Ten no Jou'ou) is the goddess of the Ancient Choujin Realm and is said to be the most beautiful being in existence. Hundreds of millions of years ago, when the Islands of Japan and the African continent were still connected, she brought the Tag Trophy to what is now Lake Mashu, where the Pyramid Ring arrives. He is voiced by Hiromi Tsuru.

=== Ultimate Choujin Arc ===
- Gunshi Yama Khan (軍師ヤマカーン, Strategist Yama Kān) is the Ultimate Choujin Leader. Fights against Kinnikuman. He is able to switch places with Kinnikuman during the Kinniku Driver and Kinniku Buster with his Ultimate Warp technique. After his defeat, he attempts suicide but is stopped by Kinnikuman and the others. His name appears to come from Yamamoto Kansuke, the brilliant strategist who served under the famous daimyō Takeda Shingen. He is voiced by Kazuhiko Kishino.
- Kareiyasu (カレイヤス) is one of the Four Fiends of the Ultimate Chojin. Long ago he fought with Sneagator, who was so amazed by his transformation abilities that he trembled in fear and left the fight after only a minute. He fights against Kinnikuman and can transform into various carnivorous plants. He is voiced by Hideyuki Tanaka.
- Hell Knight (ヘルナイト) is one of the Four Fiends of the Ultimate Chojin. Fights with a katana. He and several Psycho Soldiers fight against Robin Mask and Warsman. He is defeated by Robin Mask's Tower Bridge. He is voiced by Daisuke Gōri.
- Chikāra (チカーラ) is one of the Four Fiends of the Ultimate Chojin. He and several Psycho Soldiers fight against Buffaloman and is defeated by his new Hurricane Missile technique. He is voiced by Yonehiko Kitagawa.
- Gungarian (ガンガリアン) is one of the Four Fiends of the Ultimate Chojin. Uses a gun during combat. He and several Psycho Soldiers fight against Terryman and Brocken Jr. and is defeated by Terryman's Calf Branding. He is voiced by Hideyuki Hori.

=== Goku'aku Choujin Arc ===
- Princess Lilly (リリー姫, Ririi-hime) is the princess of Planet Kinmoku. Kinnikuman is fascinated by her beauty. She is voiced by Minori Matsushima.
- Baron Ram (ラム男爵, Ramu-danshaku) is Princess Lilly's fiancé. He acts as the referee and general moderator for the matches. He is voiced by Issei Futamata.
- Prince Cherry (チェリー王子, Cherii-ouji) is Princess Lilly's little brother. He is voiced by Hiromi Tsuru.
- Dirty Baron (ダーティーバロン) is the Gokuaku Choujin Leader. He drinks Buffaloman's blood in order to become his brother. Because the volcano underneath the ring where first fought Kinnikuman erupts, the match ends in a draw. During the rematch, he counters Kinnikuman's 48 Killer Techniques with his own 96 Killer Techniques and gains the advantage. In addition to Kinnikuman's, he also has variations of the other Seigi Choujins techniques. The match and story arc conclude when the power of the Sword of Justice is suddenly awakened and blows him away (it is believed that this quick ending was devised due to the series' cancellation). He is voiced by Daisuke Gōri.
- Wild Bakuto (ワイルドバクト) is the Gokuaku Choujin Subleader. He fights against Terryman. He has no bones, but his muscles are hard enough to be considered bone. He is voiced by Tetsuo Mizutori.
- Jiraiyer (ジライヤー) fights against Robin Mask during the 5-on-3 Death Match. He could fire beams and body doubles from his hand. He is eventually thrown down the Sky Devil ravine by Robin's "Modified Tower Bridge" technique. He is voiced by Banjō Ginga, Hideyuki Tanaka (ep. 134)
- Gudon (グドン) fights with Jiraiyer against Robin Mask during the 5-on-3 Death Match. They are both eventually thrown down the Sky Devil ravine by Robin's "Modified Tower Bridge" technique. He is voiced by Kazuhiko Kishino.
- Bull Docky (ブルドッキー) fights with Warsman during the 5-on-3 Death Match. His fangs are destroyed by Warsman's Bear Claws. In the end, they are both thrown into the ravine by Warsman's new finishing move "Siberian Snow Storm". He is voiced by Issei Futamata.
- Big Magnum (ビッグマグナム) trespasses during the 5-on-3 Death Match. Defeated by Warsman's new finishing move "Siberian Snow Storm". He is voiced by Kōji Totani.
- Baracky (バラッキー) uses the Seven Tools of the Shinigami and can separate his body. He fights against Brocken Jr. during the 5-on-3 Death Match. He is defeated when Brocken splits his head in half. The bara in his name is a Japanese onomatopoeia which refers to something falling apart. He is voiced by Hideyuki Hori.
