= Hideyuki Hori =

Japanese actor (born 1954)

- 堀 秀行
- Born: Hidemitsu Hori; March 23, 1954 (age 72); Setagaya, Tokyo, Japan
- Occupations: Actor; voice actor; narrator
- Years active: 1979–present
- Agent: Aoni Production
- Relatives: Yukitoshi Hori (brother)

Hidemitsu Hori (堀 秀光, Hori Hidemitsu; born March 23, 1954), better known professionally by his stage name Hideyuki Hori (堀 秀行, Hori Hideyuki), is a Japanese actor, voice actor, narrator and the younger brother of voice actor Yukitoshi Hori affiliated with Aoni Production.

He is most well known for his roles in Saint Seiya as Phoenix Ikki, Sakigake!! Otokojuku as Momotaro Tsurugi, Kinnikuman as Warsman, Dragon Ball Z as Captain Ginyu, Mobile Fighter G Gundam as Kyoji Kasshu / Schwarz Bruder, the Dead or Alive series and Ninja Gaiden as Ryu Hayabusa, and One Piece as Bartholomew Kuma.

== Career ==
Along with Akira Kamiya and Hideyuki Tanaka, he was one of the most frequently used voice actors from the 80s~90s, having appeared in Saint Seiya (in which he co-starred with his brother Yukitoshi), Kinnikuman, Dragon Quest: The Adventure of Dai, Dragon Ball Z, Fist of the North Star, Sakigake!! Otokojuku, and several others.

As an actor, he performed in NHK's Taiga drama "Tokugawa Ieyasu" as Yuki Hideyasu.

== Filmography ==
=== Television drama ===
- Tokugawa Ieyasu (1983) (Yūki Hideyasu)

=== Television animation ===
- Ai Shōjo Pollyanna Monogatari (Timothy)
- Albegas (Tetsuya Jin)
- Aoki Densetsu Shoot! (Ryūji Kanou)
- Armored Fleet Dairugger XV (Miranda Keats)
- Black Cat (Belze Rochefort)
- Black Jack (Tezuka)
- Blue Comet SPT Layzner (Ahmos Gale)
- Captain Tsubasa J (Roberto Hongo)
- Chibi Maruko-chan (Tatsuo)
- City Hunter 2 (Robert Harrison)
- Dragon Quest: The Adventure of Dai (Hyunkel)
- Detective Conan (Tomoaki Araide)
- Digimon Fusion (Dorbickmon)
- Digimon Ghost Game (Matadormon)
- Doraemon (Adult Nobita)
- Dragon Ball Z (Captain Ginyu)
- Dr. Slump and Arale-chan (Auto Bike Monk)
- Fafner of the Azure (Michio Hino)
- Fist of the North Star (Ryuuga)
- Generator Gawl (Kanae)
- Lady Georgie (Abel)
- Getbackers (Kurusu Masaki)
- Ghost Sweeper Mikami (Nomura)
- Ginga: Nagareboshi Gin (John)
- Guardian Angel Getten (Tarousuke Shichiri)
- Transformer: The Headmaster (Chromedome)
- High School! Kimengumi (Rinji Chu)
- Inuyasha (Tōkajin)
- Keroro Gunso (Tora-otoko)
- Kinnikuman (Warsman (ep. 65~), Gangarian, Baracky, Specialman)
- Kinnikuman Nisei (Kinkotsuman)
- Magical Taruruto-kun (Shogunnosuke Edojō)
- Marvel Disk Wars: The Avengers (Nozomu Akatsuki)
- Mission: Yozakura Family (Yoshimasa Kuroyuri)
- Mobile Suit Gundam Seed (George Glenn)
- Mobile Suit Gundam Seed Destiny (Lord Djibril)
- Mobile Fighter G Gundam (Schwarz Bruder, Kyoji Kasshu)
- O~i! Ryoma (Takechi Hanpeita)
- One Piece (Bartholomew Kuma, Vinsmoke Judge)
- Otogi-Jūshi Akazukin (Shirayukihime's father)
- Patalliro! (Plasma X)
- Remi, Nobody's Girl (Collard)
- Sakigake!! Otokojuku (Momotarou Tsurugi)
- Saint Seiya (Phoenix Ikki)
- Shinzo (Katorasu) (ep. 1-2)
- Slam Dunk (Coach Kawasaki)
- Space Carrier Blue Noah (Tatsuya Inoue)
- Tatakae!! Ramenman (Chuchai)
- Tiger Mask Nisei (Tatsuo Aku/Tiger Mask)
- Tiger Mask W (Kenny Omega)
- Transformers: Super-God Masterforce (Chromedome)
- You're Under Arrest (Strike Otoko)
- Zentrix (Jarad)

=== Original video animations ===
- Ai no Kusabi (Sid)
- Baoh (Ikuro Hashizawa)
- Fuma no Kojiro (Ryouma)
- Legend of the Galactic Heroes (Maximillian von Castrop)
- Saint Seiya Hades Saga Sanctuary (Phoenix Ikki)
- Sohryuden (Hajime Ryudo)
- Kyō Kara Ore Wa!! (Ito shinji)

=== Theatrical animation ===
- Doraemon: Nobita and the Dragon Knight (1987) (Banpo)
- Kinnikuman Series (xxxx) (Warsman)
- Perfect Blue (xxxx) (Sakuragi)
- Persona 3 The Movie: No. 1, Spring of Birth (Shuji Ikutsuki)
- Persona 3 The Movie: No. 2, Midsummer Knight's Dream (xxxx) (Shuji Ikutsuki)
- Rokudenashi BLUES (xxxx) (Taison Maeda)
- Saint Seiya Series (xxxx) Phoenix Ikki)
- Memories (1995) (Nobuo Tanaka)

=== Video games ===
- Kidou Senshi Gundam games (Schwarz Bruder)
- Black Matrix (Leburobs)
- BS Fire Emblem: Akaneia Senki (Hardin, Village Youth of Chapter 2, Cassim, and Mediusu)
- Dead or Alive Series (Ryu Hayabusa)
- Dragon Ball Z Series (Captain Ginyu)
- Dragon Ball Z Sparking! Series (Captain Ginyu)
- Kinnikuman Series (Warsman, Chloe, Kinkotsuman)
- Langrisser I & II (Keith)
- Langrisser III (Chester)
- Langrisser V: The End of Legend (Omega-137)
- Ninja Gaiden (Ryu Hayabusa)
- One Piece Series (Bartholomew Kuma)
- Persona 3 (Shuji Ikutsuki)
- Saint Seiya Hades Saga (Phoenix Ikki)
- Super Robot Wars (Ahmos Gale, Schwarz Bruder, Kyouji Kasshu)
- Tales of Berseria (Phoenix)
- Tales of Zestiria (Sergei Strelka)
- Ys I, II, IV (Keith Fact)

=== Drama CDs ===
- Abunai series 3: Abunai Bara to Yuri no Sono
- Abunai series 4: Abunai Campus Love (Tatsuhiko Fujikawa)
- Koikina Yatsura 1 - 3 & side story (Kyouhei Shimazu)
- Mistcast series (Kengo Hazama)
- The Dark Blue (Hazel)

=== Tokusatsu ===
- Gougou Sentai Boukenger (Great Sword Man Zubaan)
- Mega Monster Battle: Ultra Galaxy (Battle Nizer)
- Tetsuwan Tantei Robotack (Kamerock)
- Ultraman Mebius Side Story: Ghost Reverse (Mechazam/Ghost Reverse)

=== Dubbing ===
- Dune (Paul Atreides (Kyle MacLachlan))
- Funky Monkey (Alec McCall (Matthew Modine))
- Hot Shots! (LT Kent Gregory (Cary Elwes))
- Mrs. Doubtfire (Stu (Pierce Brosnan))
- My Lucky Stars (Ricky Fung (Yuen Biao))
- Passenger 57 (Sly Delvecchio (Tom Sizemore))
- Rain Man (Charlie Babbitt (Tom Cruise))
- Someone like You (Ray Brown (Greg Kinnear))
- Virtual Wars (Jobe Smith (Jeff Fahey))
- Twin Peaks (Harold Smith (Lenny Von Dohlen))
- White Men Can't Jump (Billy Hoyle (Woody Harrelson))
