= Yōsuke Akimoto =

Japanese actor and voice actor (born 1944)

- 秋元 羊介
- Born: Yukio Tajika; February 5, 1944 (age 82); Tokyo, Japan
- Occupations: Actor, voice actor
- Years active: 1967–present
- Children: Kotaro Tajika

Yōsuke Akimoto (秋元 羊介, Akimoto Yōsuke; born Yukio Tajika (田鹿 幸雄, Tajika Yukio), February 5, 1944) is a Japanese actor and voice actor from Tokyo. He is attached to Office PAC. He is a graduate of the Hosei University business school.

== Filmography ==
=== Animation ===
- Mobile Suit Gundam 0080: War in the Pocket as Steiner Hardie
- Mobile Suit Gundam 0083: Stardust Memory as Dick Allen
- Stratos 4 as Robert Reynolds
- The Silent Service as Saburō Akagaki, Mihairu Marenkofu
- Mobile Suit Gundam 0083: The Last Blitz of Zeon as Dick Allen
- Perfect Blue as Tejima
- Pocket Monsters: Mewtwo Strikes Back as Professor
- Touch 2: Sayonara no Okurimono as Uemura
- Touch 3: Kimi ga Tōri Sugita Ato ni as Sumi
- Kishidou Club
- Super Robot Red Baron (1973) as Iron Alliance Commander
- Touch (1985) as Kamimura
- Machine Robo: Revenge of Cronos (1986) as Garudi
- City Hunter (1987) as Tomomura
- Metal Armor Dragonar (1987) as Roy
- Legend of the Galactic Heroes (1988) as Hirudesuhaimu, Leader of the PKC
- Akira (1988) as Harukiya Bartender
- Mobile Suit Gundam: Char's Counterattack (1988) as Captain Musaka
- Tatakae!! Ramenman (1988) as Shōkokurō Kensō
- Lupin III: Bye Bye Liberty Crisis (1989) as Taxi driver
- Magical Angel Sweet Mint (1990) as Subittsu, Announcer, Kantoku, Borisuman
- Mystery of the Hemingway Papers (1990) as Carlos
- Giant Robo (1992) as Alberto
- Mobile Fighter G Gundam (1994) as Master Asia, Stalker
- Saint Tail (1995) as Ōkura
- Slayers NEXT (1996) as Seigram
- Detective Conan (1996) as Tōru Imai's husband, Benzō Kadowaki, Kazuyuki Kawai, Shin'ichi Takeda, Ryūtarō
- Denji Sentai Megaranger (1997) as Lizard Nejilar
- Gasaraki (1998) as Sorachi Genjyo
- Noir (2001) as Kanora
- Kiddy Grade (2002) as Deuxiem
- Mobile Suit Gundam SEED (2002) as Siegel Clyne
- Crayon Shin-chan (2003) as Kenta Musashino's father
- Last Exile (2003) as De Vido Madosein
- Planetes (2003) as Roland
- Pokémon Advanced Generation (2003) as Hagi
- Stratos 4 (2003) as Robert Reynolds
- Uninhabited Planet Survive! (2003) as Principal
- Agatha Christie's Great Detectives Poirot and Marple (2004) as Rūsā
- Gankutsuou: The Count of Monte Cristo (2004) as Gerard de Villefort Procureur-général
- Ghost in the Shell: S.A.C. 2nd GIG (2004) as The Minister of Home Affairs
- Monster (2004) as Maurā
- Naruto (2004) as Wasabi Jirochō
- Ragnarok the Animation (2004) as Dark Lord
- Sgt. Frog (2004) as Elite Commanding Officer
- Tactics (2004) as Kitahara
- Gallery Fake (2005) as Bill Toravāsu
- He Is My Master (2005) as Nakabayashi Yoshitaka's father
- Angel Heart (2006) as Director
- Fist of the Blue Sky (2006) as Huáng Xī-Fēi
- Inukami! (2006) as Doctor Ru
- Utawarerumono (2006) as Niue
- Otogi-Jushi Akazukin (2006) as Rabbi
- Higurashi no Naku Koro ni Kai (2007) as Principal Kaieda
- Juken Sentai Gekiranger (2007) as Confrontation Beast Pangolin-Fist Muzankose
- Kimi ga Aruji de Shitsuji ga Ore de (2008) as Taijiri Yasushi
- Strike Witches (2008) as General Trevor Maloney
- The Sacred Blacksmith (2009) as Hannibal Quasar
- Samurai Sentai Shinkenger (2009) as Ikusazure
- SD Gundam Sangokuden Brave Battle Warriors (2010) as Enshou Bawoo
- Naruto Shippuden (2011) as Lightning Daimyo
- Nurarihyon no Mago (2011) as Hidemoto Keikain 27th
- Armored Core: Verdict Day (2013) as Fatman
- Buddy Complex (2014) as Viktor Ryazan
- Hamatora (2014) as Gasuke
- Nobunaga Concerto (2014) as Saitō Dōsan
- Tenkai Knights (2014) as Vilius
- Gunslinger Stratos: The Animation (2015) as Makabe Mondo
- Ninja Slayer (2015) as Dragon Gendoso
- Shuriken Sentai Ninninger (2015) as Super Advanced Yokai Shuten Douji
- Maho Girls PreCure! (2016) as Dokuroxy
- Tada Never Falls in Love (2018) as Reinbō Shōgun
- Blade of the Immortal -Immortal- (2019) as Saburō Anotsu
- Uzaki-chan Wants to Hang Out! (2020) as Master
- Arte (2020) as Ubertino
- Black Summoner (2022) as Geral
- My Daughter Left the Nest and Returned an S-Rank Adventurer (2023) as Dortos

=== Dubbing ===
Original year	Dub year	Title	Role	Original actor	Notes
		Chip 'n Dale: Rescue Rangers	Chief Marley, Clarence Dudley		
		Jackie Chan Adventures	Daoran Wong		
1974		The Texas Chain Saw Massacre	Franklin	Paul A. Partain	
1975	1978	The Man from Hong Kong	Sergeant Morrie Grosse	Hugh Keays-Byrne	
1981	1983	The Survivor	Tewson	Peter Sumner	TV Tokyo edition
1983		G.I. Joe: A Real American Hero	Stalker	Arthur Burghardt	
1984		The Adventures of Buckaroo Banzai Across the 8th Dimension	Rawhide	Clancy Brown	
1984		Indiana Jones and the Temple of Doom	Chen	Chua Kah Joo	
1985		Commando	Forrestal	Michael Delano	
1985	2012	Police Story	Chu Tao	Chor Yuen	Ultimate Blu-Ray edition
1986	1987	The Hitcher	Trooper Dodge	Eugene Davis	TV Tokyo edition
1987	1990	RoboCop	Donald Johnson	Felton Perry	TV Asahi edition
1988	1992	Die Hard	Karl Vreski	Alexander Godunov	Fuji TV edition
1988		Police Story 2	Chu Tu	Chor Yuen	
1988		Tucker: The Man and His Dream	Jimmy Sakuyama	Mako	
1989		Bill & Ted's Excellent Adventure	Ludwig van Beethoven	Clifford David	
1990		Blue Steel	Assistant Chief Stanley Hoyt	Kevin Dunn	
1990		Dick Tracy	Spud Spaldoni	James Caan	
1990	1993	Jacob's Ladder	Paul Gruneger	Pruitt Taylor Vince	NTV edition
1990		Star Trek: The Next Generation	Doctor Garin	Richard Cansino	
1990–1991		Twin Peaks	Ben Horne	Richard Beymer	
1991	1994	Bill & Ted's Bogus Journey	Colonel Oats	Chelcie Ross	TV Tokyo edition
1991		My Own Private Idaho	Richard Waters	James Russo	
1991	1993	Terminator 2: Judgment Day	Miles Dyson	Joe Morton	Fuji TV edition
1991		Terminator 2: Judgment Day	Todd Voight	Xander Berkeley	DVD/VHS edition
1992		Bob Roberts	Chet MacGregor	Ray Wise	
1992		Under Siege	Daumer	Colm Meaney	
1993		Heart and Souls	Harrison Winslow	Charles Grodin	
1993	1996	The Pelican Brief	Gavin Verheek	John Heard	TV Asahi edition
1994		Quiz Show	Dan Enright	David Paymer	
1994		Ace Ventura: Pet Detective	Emilio	Tone Loc	
1994		Batman: The Animated Series	Grant Walker		
1995		Showgirls	Phil Newkirk	Greg Travis	
1995	2003	Apollo 13	Jules Bergman	Jules Bergman	Fuji TV edition
1995	2000	Screamers	Marshal Richard Cooper, Private Becker Screamer	Roy Dupuis	Fuji TV edition
1995	1998	Seven	District Attorney Martin Talbot	Richard Roundtree	Fuji TV edition
1997		Con Air	William "Bill Bedlam" Bedford, Judge	Nick Chinlund, Kevin Cooney	
1997		Oz	Nino Schibetta	Tony Musante	
1997–1998		Star Trek: Deep Space Nine	Leck	Hamilton Camp	
1998		Out of Sight	Richard Ripley	Albert Brooks	
1998		Invasion America	Doc	Ronny Cox	
2000	2017	Snatch	Doug the Head	Mike Reid	Blu-Ray edition
2000		Thirteen Days	Curtis LeMay	Kevin Conway	
2001		Xiào Ào Jiāng Hú	Wang Yuanba	Zhang Jizhong	
2002–2003		Justice League	Vandal Savage	Phil Morris	
2004		Touching Evil	Hank	Zach Grenier	
2005		The Adventures of Greyfriars Bobby	James Brown	James Cosmo	
2005	2007	Batman Begins	Gillian B. Loeb, Fredericks	Colin McFarlane, John Nolan	NTV edition
2005		Criminal Minds	Harris	Pat Skipper	
2007		The Hunting Party	Franklin Harris	James Brolin	
2008		Made of Honor	Thomas Bailey, Sr.	Sydney Pollack	
2013		Company of Heroes	Dr. Luca Gruenewald	Jürgen Prochnow	
2014		Cuban Fury	Ron	Ian McShane	
2015–2018		Fortitude	Henry Tyson	Michael Gambon	
2015		Gridlocked	Sully	Danny Glover	
2015		Hotel Transylvania 2	Mike	Nick Offerman	
2016		Vinyl	Maury Gold	Paul Ben-Victor	
2017		Twin Peaks	Ben Horne	Richard Beymer	
2019		His Dark Materials	Farder Coram	James Cosmo	
2019		Mr. Mercedes	John Rothstein	Bruce Dern	
2020		Belgravia	Peregrine Bellasis	Tom Wilkinson	
2020	2022	Audrey	Peter Bogdanovich		

=== Video games ===
- Super Robot Wars series as Master Asia, Stalker, Steiner Hardie, Alberto the Impact, Garudi, Zanscare Soldier)
- Psychic Force (1995) as Rokudo Genma
- Tail Concerto (1998) as Russell Ryebread, King Hound III
- Radiant Silvergun (1998) as Secretary Igarashi
- Daraku Tenshi – The Fallen Angels (1998) as Torao Onigawara
- Power Stone (1999) as Gunrock
- Power Stone 2 (2000) as Gunrock, Pride
- Max Payne (2001) as Alfred Woden
- Magic Pengel (2002) as Devil
- Muv-Luv Alternative (2003) as Tadokoro
- Way of the Samurai 2 (2003) as Kurohai Tetsuo
- Tears to Tiara (2005) as Ogam
- Cowboy Bebop: Tsuioku no Serenade (2005) as Kurt Meyer
- Kingdom Hearts II (2005) as Xaldin
- Crash Boom Bang! (2006) as Doctor Neo Cortex
- Elsword (2007) as Horatio
- Fable II (2008) as Barnum
- Fallout 3 (2008) as John Henry Eden
- Tales of Hearts (2008) as Chen
- Aoi Shiro (2008) as Suzuki Yukokoroyo
- MagnaCarta II (2009) as Huaren Jass
- Kingdom Hearts 358/2 Days (2009) as Xaldin
- Kingdom Hearts Birth by Sleep (2009) as Dilan
- White Knight Chronicles (2009) as Belcitane
- Ougon Musou Kyoku (2010) as Goat
- Alan Wake (2010) as Odin Anderson
- Black Rock Shooter: The Game (2011) as SAHA
- Final Fantasy XII (2011) as Judge Bergan
- Final Fantasy Type-0 (2011) as Narrator
- Chaos Rings II (2012) as Bachs/Amon
- Phantasy Star Online 2 (2012) as Jean
- Killer Is Dead (2013) as Hamada-Yama
- Shin Megami Tensei IV (2013) as K
- Master Detective Archives: Rain Code (2023) as Zange Eraser
