= List of Mobile Fighter G Gundam episodes =

Cover of the first DVD volume release by Bandai Entertainment.

This is a list of episodes from the anime series Mobile Fighter G Gundam. The series originally aired on TV Asahi in Japan from April 1, 1994, to March 23, 1995, and later aired on Cartoon Network's Toonami programming block in the United States from August 5 to October 16, 2002. The edited version of the Toonami broadcast changed the respective names of the God Gundam and Devil Gundam to Burning Gundam and Dark Gundam, necessitating the alteration of several episode titles. The series uses four pieces of theme music: two opening themes and two ending themes. For the first twenty-five episodes, the opening theme is "Flying in the Sky" by Yoshifumi Ushima and the ending theme is "Umi Yori Mo Fukaku" (Eng. "Deeper Than the Ocean") by Etsuko Sai. For episodes twenty-six to forty-nine, the opening theme is "Trust You Forever" by Yoshifumi Ushima and the ending theme is "Kimi No Naka No Eien" (Eng. "The Eternity in You") by Inoue Takehide.

== Episodes ==
No.	Title	Original release date	English release date
1	"Gundam Fight Begins! The Gundam That Fell to Earth"; Transliteration: "Gandamufaito kaishi! Chikyū ni ochita Gandamu" (Japanese: G（ガンダム）ファイト開始! 地球に落ちたガンダム)	April 22, 1994	August 5, 2002
As the Gundam Fight is about to begin, Domon Kasshu, the Gundam Fighter of Neo Japan, arrives on Earth after his Shining Gundam has unexpectedly veered off course and crashes in Rome, together with his childhood friend and support crew Rain Mikamura. As he proceeds to show people a photo of a man and to ask if they have seen him, he runs into trouble involving the men of the local Mafia boss and Gundam Fighter for Neo Italy, Michelo Chariot, and three children, not to mention a local police inspector who is hostile towards Gundam Fighters for the destruction they bring on Earth. After Michelo kidnaps one of the children, Sophia, to provoke Domon into fighting him, Domon saves her and rises to the challenge; in the ensuing bout, Michelo and his Neros Gundam are defeated and Domon destroys Neros Gundam's head, thereby disqualifying Michelo from the tournament.
2	"Roar of the Winning Punch"; Transliteration: "Unare! Yume o tsukarunda hissatsu panchi" (Japanese: 唸れ! 夢を摑んだ必殺パンチ)	April 29, 1994	August 6, 2002
As New York City is abuzz about Chibodee Crocket, the Gundam Fighter of Neo America, and his Gundam Maxter, Domon appears during a boxing match to challenge Chibodee to a Gundam Fight. While Chibodee is more than willing to fight him, the Neo America officials are both wary of Domon's power and skeptical of Chibodee's abilities. Therefore, they set up a trap by giving different information about the fight's location to the two Gundam Fighters, ambushing Domon and attempting to assassinate him. Warned by Rain, Chibodee intervenes, declaring that he wants a fair fight, and he and Domon proceed with the match. Chibodee denies having seen the man in the photo, and Domon subsequently wins but refuses to finish him off. Chibodee nonetheless gains the respect and the admiration of the New York people.
3	"Beat the Dragon Gundam"; Transliteration: "Taose! Majin Doragongandamu" (Japanese: 倒せ! 魔神ドラゴンガンダム)	May 6, 1994	August 7, 2002
As Domon travels to Neo China, he is approached by two Shaolin monks who urge him to take on the Gundam Fighter of Neo China, who has apparently gone rogue; Domon accepts and goes off to find him. On the road he is joined by a young boy, who doesn't recognize the man in Domon's photo, and they are subsequently captured by a band of thugs. As Domon manages to break out, the boy gets to the Dragon Gundam and reveals himself as Sai Saici, the Neo China representative. He and Domon fight, but despite his young age Sai Saici proves to be a match for him, and the bout ends in a draw; Domon and Rain head off again in search of someone who might give them information about the man Domon is looking for.
4	"Challenge! The Red Rose Knight!"; Transliteration: "Iza shobu! Shinku no bara no kikōshi" (Japanese: いざ勝負! 真紅のバラの貴公子)	May 13, 1994	August 8, 2002
In his eagerness, Domon interrupts a fight between Neo France's representative, George de Sand, and another opponent, but George, disgusted at this cavalier attitude, refuses to accept the challenge. Desperate to meet George again in battle, Domon accepts the plan of the Princess of Neo France, Marie Louise, to fake her kidnapping and have George come to save her with his Gundam Rose. George obliges, but during the fight he willingly leaves himself open for attack as he prevents the Eiffel Tower from falling on Rain and Marie Louise, and Domon refuses to take off his Gundam's head. After the match, George reveals that he knew the kidnapping was a set-up; he further declares he does not know the man in the photo, and Domon and Rain leave for Neo Russia.
5	"Great Escape! A Captive Gundam Fighter"; Transliteration: "Dai dassō! Toraware no gandamufaitā" (Japanese: 大脱走! 囚われのガンダムファイター)	May 20, 1994	August 12, 2002
In Neo Russia, Domon has gone after the country's Gundam Fighter, but he is arrested by the local police and thrown into a large prison; he discovers that Neo Russia's tactic is based on luring other Gundam Fighters, only to have them arrested and thrown in prison. The victims' Gundams are then examined and scavenged for technology to improve their own. As Domon manages to escape with the help of two other prisoners, one of them is revealed as Argo Gulskii, Neo Russia's Gundam Fighter, who went along to have Domon expose his Gundam. Domon and Argo fight, which ends in a draw. Later, Domon and Rain are told that Argo is a former space pirate who has been coerced to becoming a Gundam Fighter, with a bomb strapped on his chest to ensure his loyalty, and that he can find freedom only in fighting. Their questions still unanswered, they leave again.
6	"Fight, Domon! Earth is the Ring"; Transliteration: "Tatakae Domon! Chikyū ga ringu da" (Japanese: 闘えドモン! 地球がリングだ)	May 27, 1994	August 13, 2002
Domon visits a run-down temple in Kyoto, where he is drugged and kidnapped. Neo Japan officials bring Domon to the Neo Japan space colony and subject him to a virtual reality simulation without his knowledge, to determine if he is the right choice for Neo Japan's Gundam Fighter. In the simulation, Domon has just returned home after 10 years of training under Master Asia, the Undefeated of the East, who passed down to Domon his former title of the King of Hearts. He is reunited with his parents and his brother, Kyoji, who is revealed to be the person whose photo Domon has been carrying around. Domon hallucinates a slightly altered version of a past event, in which Kyoji and their father, Raizo Kasshu, show Domon their new invention, the Ultimate Gundam. The police burst in to arrest Kyoji and Raizo for treason for intending to use the Ultimate Gundam as a weapon, killing Domon's mother in the process. Kyoji escapes to Earth with the Ultimate Gundam but crashes, and Raizo is ruled an accomplice and sentenced to indefinite cryogenic suspension. It is revealed to Domon that the Ultimate Gundam has the ability to self-multiply, self-recover, and self-evolve, and that Kyoji will resurrect and use the Gundam for absolute destruction; the government convinces Domon to become a Gundam Fighter in order to find and capture his brother. In the next simulation Domon fights the Devil Gundam, the corrupted form of the Ultimate Gundam. Thanks to visual effects, the Mobile Armor Fantoma is disguised as the Devil Gundam. Rain, who has been concerned about the simulation's cruelty, rushes out to stop it and accidentally collides with her transport. Domon sees her and is reminded of his mother's death. This enrages Domon and he unlocks the Shining Gundam's Super Mode, allowing him to destroying the illusion. He then lashes out at one of the officials for twisting his mental state and returns to Earth alongside Rain with a renewed vigor.
7	"Prepare to Fight! Desperate Fugitive"; Transliteration: "Kurunara koi! Hisshi no tōbōsha" (Japanese: 来るなら来い! 必死の逃亡者)	June 3, 1994	August 14, 2002
Domon goes to Neo Mexico in order to fight the Gundam Fighter, Chico Rodriguez, but upon arrival he learns that the fighter has run away and is being hunted by the local authorities. Chico is running away with his dying sister and refuses to fight. Her wish is to stay on Earth. However, should Chico lose he would have to return to the space colonies with her. Therefore, he has decided to avoid fighting. After Domon helps him avoid the authorities, the fighter agrees to a bout and the fight ensues. Domon appears to kill Chico by destroying the Gundam, but this was only a ruse to fool the local authorities into thinking Chico died in battle. Chico swims to shore and he and his sister leave to go live peacefully for the remainder of her life.
8	"Old Grudge: Revenge of the Space Police"; Transliteration: "Kataki wa utsu! Fukushū no uchū keiji" (Japanese: 仇は討つ! 復讐の宇宙刑事)	June 10, 1994	August 15, 2002
Domon travels to Neo Canada to fight Andrew Graham and his Lumber Gundam, but Andrew refuses, and he is defeated unofficially, as no official match takes place. Andrew takes Rain hostage in order to lure Argo out. He holds a grudge against Argo because his wife was killed by Argo back in Argo's pirating days. Argo's pirate ship had collided into the space station Andrew and his wife were in, causing her to get lost in space. Argo takes the bait and goes to find the Lumber Gundam. The fight ensues, but Domon loses his patience and goes to get Rain back. After a few maneuvers, the Shining Gundam falls off a cliff and the Lumber Gundam, with Rain and Andrew inside, is left hanging on the cliff. Andrew apologizes to Rain, realizing that by endangering her he's done the very thing he resented Argo for. Argo helps the Lumber Gundam up, much to the surprise of everyone else. It is then revealed that Argo tried to save Andrew's wife, not kill her.
9	"Powerful Enemy! Chapman's Heroic Challenge"; Transliteration: "Kyōteki! Eiyū Chappuman no chōsen" (Japanese: 強敵! 英雄チャップマンの挑戦)	June 17, 1994	August 19, 2002
Domon tries to defeat Neo England's Gentle Chapman who has won his fights through the use of unfair tactics (having used them recently on George de Sand). Though Chapman repents and is killed in the fight, he says that his fate is the fate of all Gundam Fighters.
10	"Terror! The Phantom Fighter Appears"; Transliteration: "Kyōfu! Bōrei faitā shutsugen" (Japanese: 恐怖! 亡霊ファイター出現)	June 24, 1994	August 20, 2002
Domon and Rain travel to Neo Egypt in order to face off against the Pharaoh Gundam XIII there. Upon arriving, they find out the Gundam and its crew have been destroyed by a "ghost". They run into Sai Saici while he is battling this apparition, the Pharaoh Gundam IV. Sai Saici barely escapes because this Gundam uses sandstorms to hide itself and attack. The group learns that this Gundam and its pilot, Dahal Muhammad, were revived by the Devil Gundam. The pilot is possessed with a strong desire to defeat Sai Saici because Sai Saici's grandfather defeated him in the 4th Gundam Fight tournament, where he was accidentally killed. Thanks to the DG Cells, the Pharaoh Gundam IV is able to self-recover, and this time Domon uses his Shining Gundam's Super Mode to defeat it.
11	"Reunion in Falling Rain"; Transliteration: "Ame no saikai... fōringu rein" (Japanese: 雨の再会...フォーリング・レイン)	July 1, 1994	August 21, 2002
In Neo Turkey Rain runs into an old friend, Saette Gyuzelle, from school. It is revealed that he is the Neo Turkey Gundam Fighter and he has been taken over by DG Cells. He can be cured as long as the cells have not reached his brain. Domon fights and is nearly defeated by Saette, but Saette stops just before killing Domon because Rain pleads with him. Domon takes this chance and defeats Saette. Saette is cured of DG Cells and is expected to make a full recovery.
12	"He's The Undefeated of the East! Master Asia Appears"; Transliteration: "Sono na wa Tōhō Fuhai! Masutā Ajia kenzan" (Japanese: その名は東方不敗! マスター・アジア見参)	July 8, 1994	August 22, 2002
Reports of the Devil Gundam surfacing in Shinjuku send Domon and Rain to Neo Japan. They run into an army of Death Army mobile suits controlled by the Devil Gundam, and Domon tries to call his Shining Gundam. However, a masked man tells him not to and defeats the mobile suits with his bare hands. Domon immediately recognizes the fighting style of his teacher, Master Asia. The reunion is warm, but there is no time for idleness, as the situation turns dire. Domon joins the fight against the Death Army alongside his master, and together they take out hundreds of mobile suits. It is then revealed the Devil Army is piloted by DG-Cell-contaminated zombie soldiers.
13	"Big Trouble! Domon vs. Big 5"; Transliteration: "Dai pinchi! Teki wa 5 dai Gandamu" (Japanese: 大ピンチ! 敵は5大ガンダム)	July 15, 1994	August 26, 2002
Domon and Master Asia set out to search for survivors. Master leaves Domon alone and Domon is attacked by Chibodee Crocket, Argo Gulskii, Sai Saichi, and George de Sand, who appear to now serve the Devil Gundam and have gained substantial power. Master Asia challenges Domon to a race on foot, without their Gundams. Meanwhile, while waiting with the Shining Gundam, Rain is attacked by a group of powerful enemy mobile suits, so she decides to wear the Shining Gundam's Fight Suit herself. Rain defeats them, but on the way to Domon she is attacked by a mysterious Gundam. Domon fights the Gundam, but he is unable to stop its attack with his Shining Finger. He tells Rain to flee, but she refuses and expresses her resolve to fight alongside him. With both of them in the cockpit, Domon and Rain perform Ultimate Shining Finger together and defeat the enemy. The mysterious Gundam retreats, and Domon and Rain meet up with Master Asia.
14	"Shocking! Shining Finger Defeated!"; Transliteration: "Shogeki! Shainingu fingā yabure tari" (Japanese: 衝撃! シャイニング・フィンガー敗れたり)	July 22, 1994	August 27, 2002
Rain notices that there are four unidentified objects heading for Earth. She also notices that Master is going into an abandoned subway station. She follows him and loses him. Here she is hypnotized by a strange light and follows it to where she finds all of Domon's friends' crew members trapped inside DG Cell cultivation capsules. She frees them, and they explain to her that they were brought there just like she and Domon were and that something is wrong with their pilots. As they emerge from the station, they see Domon being beaten by the four Gundam Fighters. They exclaim they no longer care of their past ambitions. Master Asia comes and tries to trick Domon into joining with the others. However, Rain makes Domon realize that his master is a servant of the Devil Gundam. Master Asia transforms his Kowloon Gundam into the Gundam that almost destroyed Domon: the Master Gundam. Before he can be successful in recruiting Domon, the four unidentified objects land and reveal themselves to be the Shuffle Alliance, the strongest Gundam Fighters. After a small discussion, Master Asia retreats for the time being and says that Domon is no longer his pupil.
15	"Warrior's Crest! Goodbye, Shuffle Alliance"; Transliteration: "Senshi no shogo! Saraba, Shafuru domei" (Japanese: 戦士の称号! さらばシャッフル同盟)	July 29, 1994	August 28, 2002
A Death Army soldier comes to tell Domon that he is to meet with Master Asia alone at the Tokyo Tower. Domon goes, but along the way is stopped by his four friends. They fight him, but he eventually makes it to where Master Asia is. A fight ensues, and as Domon's four friends attempt to interfere with Master Asia and Domon's fight, the Shuffle Alliance stop them from doing so and begin to fight them. The Shuffle Alliance realizes the four people they are fighting are in fact their successors. In an effort to save them and cleanse them of DG Cells, they give their lives, passing on the Shuffle Crests to them. Master Asia mocks their sacrifice, enraging Domon, who activates his Super Mode, driving Master Asia away.
16	"Ultimate Power and Evil! Rise of the Devil Gundam" "Ultimate Power and Evil! Rise of the Dark Gundam"; Transliteration: "Saikyō saiaku! Debirugandamu gen waru" (Japanese: 最強最悪! デビルガンダム現わる)	August 5, 1994	August 29, 2002
An earthquake shakes Shinjuku, and all the members of the Shuffle Alliance along with their crews are trapped underground. Rain stumbles upon the Devil Gundam, which is absorbing its Death Army mobile suits. She is attacked by one of the Death Army suits but is saved by a masked man. Master Asia finds Rain and attacks her, but he is stopped by Domon and the others. Domon confronts Master Asia, but Master Asia says he is too late and that the Devil Gundam is ready to be revived. Above ground again, the new members of the Shuffle Alliance are easily defeated by Master Asia, except Domon. Master Asia is about to finish off Domon, but he is stopped by a stealthed Gundam Fighter, piloted by Schwarz Bruder, representing Neo Germany. He fights on par with Master Asia and gives Domon time to attack the Devil Gundam. Activating his Super Mode, he cannot bring himself to attack the cockpit, and instead aims towards the base. The Devil Gundam absorbs all his Shining Finger's energy, fully reviving. Master Asia and the Devil Gundam then disappear, leaving Domon in shambles.
17	"Challenge! Mysterious Masked Fighter"; Transliteration: "Taiketsu! Nazo no fukumen faitā" (Japanese: 対決! 謎の覆面ファイター)	August 12, 1994	September 2, 2002
Master Asia uses his knowledge of Domon and his reactions in order to lure Domon away from Shinjuku. While chasing what appears to be the Master Gundam, Domon is stopped by Schwarz, who tries to persuade him to stop chasing after Master Asia. Schwarz uses his sword to deftly cut down a tree, then leaves the sword with Domon, telling him that it will show him his ability. Domon uses the sword and is shocked to find that it is rusty and dull. Despite Schwarz's warning, Domon seeks out Master Asia and gets caught in a trap, where three Death Army soldiers ambush him. Schwarz then appears and defeats all of the Death Army soldiers, saving Domon. Schwarz scolds Domon, telling him he has already lost against Master Asia. Enraged, Domon challenges him to a Gundam Fight. Schwarz easily defeats Domon but refuses to finish him off. Domon is then attacked by another Death Army soldier that Master Asia had snuck in during their fight. About to be destroyed, Domon is able to activate his Super Mode and defeat the Death Army soldier. However, he is confused as to why the Super Mode activated at that moment, as he was not angry. Obsessed with achieving control over his Super Mode and making Schwarz's sword reflect his improved skills, Domon decides to go train at the Guyana Highlands, the area where he originally trained with Master Asia.
18	"Steal the Secret! Scheme of the Beautiful Warriors"; Transliteration: "Hissatsuwaza o nusume! Bijo gundan no daisakusen" (Japanese: 必殺技を盗め! 美女軍団の大作戦)	August 19, 1994	September 3, 2002
Chibodee is struggling mentally during battles, having flashbacks of being infected with DG Cells. His pit crew notice how strange he has been acting lately, so they run off to the Guyana Highlands. Chibodee chases them, and in the process he finds Domon and begins to train with him. Together, they sharpen their skills and get more out of their training. Meanwhile, Chibodee's crew have stolen the combat data on the Shining Gundam. Rain catches them in the act, and they run away with Rain chasing after them. During this, they all get trapped in the middle of an overflowing river and have to call for Chibodee and Domon for help. Chibodee and Domon try their best, but nothing works. A sudden gush of water threatens the girls, and Domon activates his Super Mode, stopping it. The girls are then rescued by Schwarz, who challenges Domon to master his Super Mode.
19	"Fierce Battle! Dragon Gundam vs. Bolt Gundam"; Transliteration: "Gekitō! Doragongandamu tai borutogandamu" (Japanese: 激闘! ドラゴンガンダム対ボルトガンダム)	August 26, 1994	September 4, 2002
Domon and Rain are still training in the Guyana Highlands. Rain is fixing the Shining Gundam while Domon continues his training. Schwarz Bruder is watching Domon's progress. Sai Saici, who refuses to train, suddenly jumps down from a cliff and pulls up Rain's dress to reveal her panties before running away. Domon sees this, much to his and Rain's embarrassment, and loses his balance, with Schwarz musing he has not trained enough. Meanwhile, Sai Saici has ended up in the middle of the forest, hungry. He steals some food from the Neo Russia camp and sees Nastasha bathing in a pond. He watches, but is caught when he drops his spoon. He ends up on the edge of a cliff, turns back, and bumps into Argo. Sai is then suddenly hit with memories of the Devil Gundam and has a panic attack. He falls off the cliff and returns to the Neo Japan camp. Rain chastises Sai while bandaging him. The Dragon Gundam then appears to attack the Neo Russia camp, forcing Argo to fight Sai Saici. After a tough fight, it is revealed the assailant was in fact an impostor, the Death Dragon, a Death Army copy of the Dragon Gundam. Sai and Argo, unable to fight back, are assisted by Domon and Schwarz. However, the maintenance to the Shining Gundam was incomplete, and Domon struggles to control it. However, with Schwarz's advice, he is able to focus and defeat the Death Dragon.
20	"George, Beat the Nightmare!"; Transliteration: "Joruju yo, akumu o uchikudake!" (Japanese: ジョルジュよ、悪夢を打ち砕け!)	September 2, 1994	September 5, 2002
Practicing with his butler, Raymond, George is haunted by a massacre that occurred in the Neo France colony a year before. He was fighting a fellow candidate for the 13th Gundam Fight, Jean-Pierre Mirabeau, when the king refused to acknowledge Mirabeau as the winner due to his unfair tactics. When Mirabeau attacks the king, George attempts to stop him, but in the process accidentally deflects the missiles into the audience, killing everyone. George feels guilty, and his will to fight has withered. Raymond, trying to help him out, asks Domon and Rain for help. George overhears their conversation and fires Raymond for explaining the events to them. Mirabeau breaks out of prison on the colony and heads to the Guyana Highlands in order to defeat George. Acquiring the power of DG Cells and his Mirage Gundam after meeting with Master Asia, he attacks George. Domon attempts to defeat Mirabeau but is stopped by Schwarz, who tells George he will find his answer in a Gundam Fight. Overcoming his fear, George fights Mirabeau but is caught up in his anger. After Raymond gives him advice, he uses his Shuffle Crest to get rid of the DG Cells in Mirabeau's body. After seeing this, Domon realizes how far he has to go in his training and vows to try harder.
21	"The Final Battle Approaches! Only 3 Days Away"; Transliteration: "Kesshō semaru! Taimurimitto 3-nichi mae" (Japanese: 決勝迫る! タイムリミット3日前)	September 9, 1994	September 9, 2002
With the finals only three days away, the four other members of the Shuffle Alliance wait for Domon to finish his training so they can leave for Neo Hong Kong, where the finals will take place. Then, while Domon is training in a cave Schwarz attacks him with his Gundam, and Domon experiences a serene state of mind when he believes he is about to die. During this moment, he is able to hold back Schwarz's Gundam with only the sword, which has shed its rust and begun to glow. However, they are interrupted by the Death Army. Domon attempts to call his Gundam, but it is too far away. Rain decides to manually deliver the Shining Gundam, taking control of it herself. Finding who she believes to be Domon, she lowers her guard, only for it to be an ambush by Master Asia and Death Army soldiers; the Death Army soldiers beat down the Shining Gundam, injuring Rain. Domon arrives and boards the Shining Gundam, challenging Master Asia to a fight. However, Schwarz tries to convince him to fight as a team, as his training is not yet complete.
22	"Breakthrough! Warriors Strong Ties"; Transliteration: "Senshi no kizuna! Debiru hōi-mō o toppa seyo" (Japanese: 戦士の絆! デビル包囲網を突破せよ)	September 16, 1994	September 10, 2002
Being attacked by several Gundam Heads, the Shuffle Alliance and crew retreat. The Shuffle Alliance members decide to fight the Death Army in order to give Rain and Domon time to fix the Shining Gundam, which was heavily damaged by Master Asia. Schwarz Bruder has a plan, and he takes a signal flare and places it into a river. He then disappears. Domon soon realizes Rain has been risking her health in order to continuously work on the Gundam, and he insists on helping her make the final repairs. The Death Army attacks and is repelled by the Shuffle Alliance. After some time Master Asia decides he should make a personal appearance, so he heads into the battle with his Master Gundam. He notices the flare Schwarz put in the river and destroys it, triggering the flare as Schwarz intended. Schwarz sees this and attacks the waterfall. The resulting gush of water drowns the Death Army, as they are not amphibious. This gives the Shuffle Alliance time to escape the Guyana Highlands. Domon decides to stay back and confront Master Asia, and he entrusts Rain to the Neo Russia support crew, breaking his promise that he would let her stay with him due to his concern for her. To Domon's shock, Master Asia brings forth the Devil Gundam.
23	"Destined Battle! Domon vs. Devil Gundam" "Destined Battle! Domon vs. Dark Gundam"; Transliteration: "Shukumei no tatakai! Domon tai debirugandamu" (Japanese: 宿命の戦い! ドモン対デビルガンダム)	September 23, 1994	September 11, 2002
In the Neo Japan space colony, Major Ulube and Dr Mikamura decide to send the God Gundam down to the Guyana Highlands as the Shining Gundam doesn't have enough power to defeat the Devil Gundam. They are hesitant because the God Gundam was only supposed to be used during the finals. Rain contacts them and informs them that Domon is still stuck in the Guyana Highlands, so they finally decide to send the God Gundam down. Back in the Guyana Highlands, Domon is getting thrashed by Master Asia, who is bent on forcing Domon to engage the Super Mode. The attempts at angering Domon are working, and he is slowly losing control until Schwarz Bruder shows up and tries to calm down Domon. Domon is further enraged, however, when he sees that Kyoji stands atop the Devil Gundam and appears to be controlling it. Schwarz leaves, hoping Domon will calm down if he fights alone, but Domon's anger wins and he goes on a rampage. Master Asia is easily able to fend off Domon's wild attacks, but Schwarz comes back to Domon's aid. Master Asia destroys Schwarz's cockpit, seriously injuring Schwarz in the process. This calms Domon down, and Schwarz reminds Domon of his training in the cave. Realizing what his training was for, he achieves a serene state of mind, unlocking the True Super Mode. He easily defeats Master Asia and attacks the Devil Gundam with his Shining Finger, seemingly destroying it along with Kyoji. Schwarz's mask then falls off as he stops Master Asia (who, in shock, recognizes him) from reaching Domon.
24	"Bright New Star! The Birth of the God Gundam" "Bright New Star! The Birth of the Burning Gundam"; Transliteration: "Aratanaru kagayaki! Goddogandamu tanjō" (Japanese: 新たなる輝き! ゴッドガンダム誕生)	September 30, 1994	September 12, 2002
The four members of the Shuffle Alliance reach Neo Hong Kong for the finals. However, Domon is not there. Still trapped in the Guyana Highlands, he spots a Neo Japan capsule containing the God Gundam. Attacked by the Master Gundam, he sacrifices the Shining Gundam to reach the capsule. However, the combat data from the Shining Gundam is required for it to move. Using an experimental device, Rain is able to remotely take control of the Shining Gundam and transfer the data manually. On his way to Neo Hong Kong, Domon is attacked by four unidentified Mobile Fighters. This slows him down, with Domon barely making it in time.
25	"All Fighters Gathered! The Final Battles Begin"; Transliteration: "Kesshō kaimaku! Gandamufaitā dai shūgō" (Japanese: 決勝開幕! ガンダムファイター大集合)	October 7, 1994	September 16, 2002
Domon arrives in Neo Hong Kong moments before the deadline. In the secrecy of his office, Prime Minister Wong reveals that as he is overseeing the Gundam tournament he will be looking for someone, trying to determine the strongest Gundam Fighter of all. The opening ceremonies start, and Domon and the others are surprised to learn that Master Asia is back in his Master Gundam, and that Michelo Chariot and Gentle Chapman are back, even though Domon had disqualified Michelo and Chapman had apparently died. The opening ceremony commences with introductions of the Gundams in the finals with a recap of the abilities of the Bolt Gundam, Dragon Gundam, Gundam Maxter, and Gundam Rose. Domon makes an open declaration at the ceremony, vowing to win all his matches in the preliminaries in order to fight Master Asia.
26	"A New Weapon! Erupting God Finger" "A New Weapon! Erupting Burning Finger"; Transliteration: "Shin hissatsuwaza! Bakunetsu goddo fingā!!" (Japanese: 新必殺技! 爆熱ゴッド・フィンガー!!)	October 14, 1994	September 17, 2002
The finals have started and Domon's first opponent is Zeus Gundam of Neo Greece, the favorite to win the championship. Wong and Master Asia are planning to pit Domon against only the strongest fighters, in order to determine if he is the strongest. Domon is restless, so he goes through Neo Hong Kong looking for a different place to stay. He sees the Zeus Gundam and meets its pilot. Domon boasts he will easily defeat him, which provokes the latter into a fight. Domon is defeated by him due to his immense strength and size. Domon is thrown into the sea, where he is picked up by an old man and his grandchildren aboard a small fishing boat. The old man gives Domon some advice, and Domon becomes more confident. The match begins, and it looks as if Domon is going to lose, with the God Gundam taking several hits. It turns out Domon was letting the Zeus Gundam attack him, and Domon defeats the Zeus Gundam with his new technique, the Erupting God Finger.
27	"Hang on Domon! Triumph of the Restored Faith"; Transliteration: "Ganbare Domon! Tomo ni sasageta dai shōri" (Japanese: 頑張れドモン! 友に捧げた大勝利)	October 21, 1994	September 18, 2002
Domon is about to face off against Cobra Gundam of Neo India. The pilot of Cobra Gundam has no qualms about hurting Domon before the match. A group of street kids (whose leader is fascinated by Gundams), follows Domon to his Gundam hangar, Hui helps one of them to trick Domon and their lead boy Chan rushed into the hangar in an attempt to steal Domon's God Gundam. The theft failed and Domon saves Chan's life, but dislocates his shoulder in the process. During the fight against the Cobra Gundam, Domon is in pain because he is being constantly attacked on his injured shoulder. Cobra Gundam wraps tightly around Domon, but at the last minute he dislocates his shoulder, breaking free. He then finishes off the Cobra Gundam with his Erupting God Finger. After the fight, Hui and the kids from earlier apologize and Domon forgives them.
28	"Domon Targeted! The Assassin's Staff"; Transliteration: "Nerawareta Domon! Koroshi-ya faitā no hissatsu ken" (Japanese: 狙われたドモン! 殺し屋ファイターの必殺剣)	October 28, 1994	September 19, 2002
Schwarz Bruder fights the Viking Gundam, easily defeating it. Domon's next opponent, Neo Nepal's Kyral Mekirel, is an assassin who has won all of his matches by default by killing his opponents before the matches. Attacking Domon, he fails to assassinate him. It is revealed that in the past Kyral had participated in another Gundam Fight, where he lost his eyesight after lowering his guard. Angry at the Gundam Fight, he returned for revenge. Schwarz gives Domon advice for the match. During the fight, Domon is able to overcome his fear of Kyral's techniques. They then face in a deciding duel, with Kyral being defeated; at the last moment he saw Domon's friends supporting him and hesitated. Kyral then leaves to help the families of his victims.
29	"Running Away! Sai Saici In Love"; Transliteration: "Shiai hōki!? Koi ni dokidokisai saishī" (Japanese: 試合放棄!? 恋にドキドキサイ・サイシー)	November 4, 1994	September 23, 2002
Sai Saici's next opponent is the Mermaid Gundam of Neo Denmark. However, he is distracted as he falls in love with a girl named Cecil. They go on dates, which prevents Sai from training. Later, Sai learns that Cecil is related to the pilot of Mermaid Gundam, Hans Holger. Sai refuses to fight, but Cecil snaps him out of it. Sai almost arrives late for the match, but Domon helps him make it on time. Sai manages to defeat the Mermaid Gundam by ripping off his own Gundam's arm and using it as a decoy. Cecil and Hans have to leave, and Cecil kisses Sai, wishing him luck in the finals.
30	"Beautiful Fighter! Dangerous Allenby"; Transliteration: "Bishōjo faitā! Denjarasu arenbī" (Japanese: 美少女ファイター! デンジャラス・アレンビー)	November 11, 1994	September 24, 2002
Domon is set to face off against Neo Sweden's Allenby Beardsley, a female Gundam Fighter who defeated Argo in under a minute. He meets her in an arcade and fights her in a fighting simulator, ending in a tie after the machine breaks down. They become friends, and Rain becomes jealous of the friendship and thinks it's wrong for Gundam Fighters to be so close to each other. Running away from her crew, Allenby arrives where Domon and the others are, having dinner with them. The fight begins the next day between God Gundam and Allenby's Nobel Gundam, and Domon and Allenby are having a great time until Allenby's crew decides to engage the Berserker System. This turns Allenby into a berserker, and this upsets Domon, who says he will not fight her in this state because it's not fun. Using his Erupting God Finger, Domon is able to help Allenby break free from the control of the system. Allenby decides to finish the fight, but collapses from exhaustion.
31	"Dazzling Power of the Clown! Get Mad, Gundam Maxter"; Transliteration: "Piero no genwaku! Okore gandamumakkusutā" (Japanese: ピエロの幻惑! 怒れガンダムマックスター)	November 18, 1994	September 25, 2002
Chibodee lost his mother to a group of terrorist clowns and since then has been afraid of them. When his next opponent is Jester Gundam of Neo Portugal, who copies everyone's moves and is dressed like a clown, Chibodee is tormented by flashbacks and it looks like he will lose fairly quickly. However, when his crew sings a song his mother used to sing to him as a child to boost his morale, he defeats the mad clown.
32	"Dangerous Trap! Neros Gundam Strikes Back"; Transliteration: "Kiken'na wana! Nerosugandamu no dai gyakushū" (Japanese: 危険な罠! ネロスガンダムの大逆襲)	November 25, 1994	September 26, 2002
Dr Mikamura and other Neo Japan officials are trying to recover the remains of the Devil Gundam, but their troops have gone missing. Meanwhile, an enormous shipping container is inauspiciously being flown into Neo Hong Kong. Michelo Chariot convinces a group of defeated Gundam Fighters to seek revenge on Domon. Allenby sees this and follows them, but she is unable to eavesdrop. Carlos of Neo Spain calls on Domon to meet with him at his place, where an explosion immediately goes off. Michelo is at the scene, and Domon fights him but Michelo escapes; Allenby tells Domon what she witnessed, and the two go in search of information about Michelo, where they are spotted by Wong and brought to his office. Domon confronts him about the disqualified fighters returning for the finals, and Wong challenges him to ask Michelo if he defeats him in the next fight. Michelo's group attempts to assassinate the other members of the Shuffle Alliance as well, but they each survive. The fight commences between Domon and Michelo, who vowed vengeance for his earlier defeat and allied himself with Master Asia and the Devil Gundam. Domon easily beats Michelo, but as Domon prepares to finish him off, Michelo lets out a cloud of smoke that encompasses the entire fighting arena. In the smoke, Neros Gundam somehow transforms into the Gundam Heaven's Sword that attacked Domon on his way to Neo Hong Kong. Domon defeats Gundam Heaven's Sword, and Michelo returns to normal as the smoke clears in the ring. Finally, back in the government building it is revealed Wong has obtained the tattered Devil Gundam and intends to use it to maintain his position as supreme ruler.
33	"Emissary of Darkness! Chapman Rises Again"; Transliteration: "Jigoku kara no shisha! Chappuman fukkatsu" (Japanese: 地獄からの使者! チャップマン復活)	December 2, 1994	September 27, 2002
George's next opponent is Gentle Chapman, who is permitted to continue participating in the Gundam Fights after he murders the Neo England official opposed to him, which is witnessed by Marie Louise. Like Michelo Chariot, Chapman is under the influence of Master Asia and the Devil Gundam. Near the beginning of the fight, the force field by the Neo France officials is down due to Michelo interfering, so George must stand in the way of all of Chapman's attacks or Marie Louise, Raymond, and the king will be killed. Domon, Rain, and Allenby break into the shield control tower and reenable the shield in the area. George attacks Chapman's Gundam, but it lets out a cloud of smoke and transforms into the Grand Gundam, one of the four Gundams that attacked Domon on his way to Neo Hong Kong. George hits the Grand Gundam in the eye and it transforms back, leaving a beaten Chapman in its stead. Marie Louise recognizes Prime Minister Wong's ring and informs the others he was also present at the murder. Her father tells her to forget the incident, given Wong's current political power over the world.
34	"Stand Up Domon! Raging Tag Team Match"; Transliteration: "Tate Domon! Arashi o yobu taggumatchi" (Japanese: 立てドモン! 嵐を呼ぶタッグマッチ)	December 9, 1994	September 30, 2002
Schwarz Bruder goes to the Neo Hong Kong government building and sees the Devil Gundam in there healing. He is noticed by Master Asia, and he flees. He spots Rain following him and carries her to safety. Prime Minister Wong believes Domon is the one who was spying, so he sets up a tag team match with Domon and Allenby versus two other Gundam fighters. The ring is rigged with a magnet which produces a gravitational field 2,000 times that of normal gravity. Domon uses his Hyper Mode which was modified by Allenby in order to break free. Domon and Allenby then use a Double God Finger attack in order to easily defeat their opponents.
35	"Showdown! Bursting Machinegun Punch"; Transliteration: "Ketchaku no toki! Ōsutoraria netsu mashinganpanchi" (Japanese: 決着の時! 豪熱マシンガンパンチ)	December 16, 1994	October 1, 2002
Now that the Devil Gundam is back, Domon requests the help of the Shuffle Alliance. However, they all refuse because the only person they want to fight is Domon. First up is Chibodee, and he shows Domon his special technique before the match. Domon then trains with Allenby in order to overcome this obstacle. During the match, Chibodee goes into Hyper Mode and pummels Domon. Domon is excited by this and also goes into Hyper Mode. Chibodee uses his extremely fast Burning Machine Gun Punch, but Domon becomes multiple God Gundams with his God Shadow technique, withstanding this attack. Domon then uses his Erupting God Finger in order to defeat Chibodee.
36	"A Knights' Pride! Gundam Rose Stolen"; Transliteration: "Kishi no hokori! Ubawareta gandamurōzu" (Japanese: 騎士の誇り! 奪われたガンダムローズ)	December 23, 1994	October 2, 2002
George and Domon are set to fight each other, but the King of Neo France says there is no need, so he locks up Gundam Rose. However, George's feelings are so strong he steals Gundam Rose and challenges Domon to a fight. George attains Hyper Mode and uses his new technique, Rose Hurricane, but Domon still beats him in the end. The king witnesses the fight and says there will be no punishment for George because George showed everything he had in that fight.
37	"Sai Saici's New Attack! Blazing Dragon Gundam"; Transliteration: "Shin ryūsei kochō ken! Moeyo doragongandamu" (Japanese: 真・流星胡蝶剣! 燃えよドラゴンガンダム)	January 6, 1995	October 3, 2002
The day before he is to fight Domon, Sai Saici isn't at all worried about the match. However, after finding and reading his father's will he decides to win the Battle Royale to revive the Shaolin Temple, which was one of his father's wishes. In the battle it looks like Domon is winning and that Sai Saici will lose. Domon rips both of the Dragon Gundam's arms off. Then Sai Saici goes into Hyper Mode and performs the Shin Ryuusei Kochouken, a move that sacrifices the fighter's life. The Emperor of China stops the fight and says he will grant Sai Saici's request to revive the Shaolin Temple if Sai Saici can win the Battle Royale.
38	"Domon vs. Argo! Charging Bolt Gundam"; Transliteration: "Domon tai arugo! Totsugeki borutogandamu" (Japanese: ドモン対アルゴ！ 突撃ボルトガンダム)	January 13, 1995	October 4, 2002
Andrew Graham of Neo Canada is facing off against Argo. Argo goes into Hyper Mode and uses a new technique, the Gaia Crusher, to create mountains in the ring. Argo wins. Meanwhile, Prime Minister Wong tells Master Asia he no longer needs Domon for the Devil Gundam, which angers Master Asia, and he reveals he now plans to use Allenby instead. The next match is a tag team match between the Domon and Allenby team and the Argo and Andrew team. Prime Minister Wong kidnaps the creator of the Berserker System and creates one of his own. At the beginning of the match, Argo splits the ring in two so he and Domon can fight by themselves. Wong activates the Berserker System and sends it up to 100%. Domon and Argo are fighting, and Domon beats Argo. All of a sudden, Allenby comes rushing out declaring she will kill Argo because he is Domon's enemy. Andrew sacrifices himself for Argo, because he finally remembers how Argo tried helping his wife at the space station.
39	"The Ultimate Attack! Duel With Master Asia"; Transliteration: "Sekiha ten kyō ken! Kettō masutā Ajia" (Japanese: 石破天驚拳! 決闘マスター・アジア)	January 20, 1995	October 7, 2002
Domon entrusts the barely conscious Allenby to Rain while he runs to help Andrew, who is badly injured. Allenby is airlifted by paramedics who refuse to let Rain accompany her. At the hospital, Argo tells Domon and Rain that Andrew survived but may not ever be able to fight again. When Allenby's crew reveals she is missing, Domon lashes out at Rain, blaming her. Domon declares he is going to search for her by himself. Fuun Saiki, Master Asia's horse, comes and delivers Domon to Master Asia. Wong hears of this and releases a Gundam head to kill Domon and Master Asia. The two fighters get stuck below ground until they find the surface. Master Asia teaches Domon the Sekiha Tenkyoken, and when they reach the surface Domon disposes of the Gundam heads with ease. Meanwhile, back in the Neo Japan consulate, it is discovered that Rain resigned as a member of the Gundam team.
40	"The Ruthless Fight! Schwarz's Last Match"; Transliteration: "Hijō no desumatchi! Shubarutsu saishū kessen" (Japanese: 非情のデスマッチ! シュバルツ最終決戦)	January 27, 1995	October 8, 2002
Domon is set to fight against Schwarz to determine the overall winner of the individual matches. Prime Minister Wong has the ring rigged with 5,000 time bombs set to explode after 8 minutes just in case there is no winner determined by that time. Meanwhile, Wong has Allenby held captive and tells Master Asia that when the time comes he will awaken her to be his ultimate fighter. Just before the match, Domon learns that Rain quit and joined up with Schwarz to represent Neo Germany. The match starts and Domon gets pummeled by Schwarz. After a while, Schwarz decides to end the fight because Domon repeatedly states that he needs nobody but himself. Domon finally learns that he needs his friends and, above all, Rain to win. Schwarz attacks and Domon uses the Sekiha Tenkyoken to defeat him. The ring explodes and Domon is victorious. At the end, the paramedics have to take off Schwarz's mask and it is found out that Schwarz is really Kyoji Kasshu.
41	"Battle Royal Begins! Devil Gundam Revived" "Battle Royal Begins! Dark Gundam Revived"; Transliteration: "Batoruroiyaru kaishi! Fukkatsu no debirugandamu" (Japanese: バトルロイヤル開始! 復活のデビルガンダム)	February 3, 1995	October 9, 2002
Domon watches over Schwarz/Kyoji in the hospital as Rain tries to reason with him while he goes to the Battle Royale. Rain sneaks in as a doctor and discovers that Schwarz is an android made up of DG cells. Rain's father also finds out since he's an expert in cybernetics. Meanwhile, Domon is fighting in the Battle Royale. He easily defeats Zeus Gundam, but the Devil Gundam claims Zeus Gundam and he comes back to attack Domon. The Devil Gundam rises and Master Asia issues a challenge to Domon. Michelo Chariot transforms into the Gundam Heaven's Sword and starts an attack on Domon while Zeus Gundam holds Domon still.
42	"Assault of the Four Evil Kings! Gundam Heaven's Sword"; Transliteration: "Kyōshū shiten'nō! Gandamuhebunzusōdo" (Japanese: 強襲四天王! ガンダムヘブンズソード)	February 10, 1995	October 10, 2002
With the help of Sai Saici and Argo, Michelo is defeated and killed; Domon then heads for the next Heavenly King, Grand Gundam. Meanwhile at the hospital it is revealed the Devil Gundam was intended to restore the Earth. However, Dr. Mikamura became jealous of Dr Kasshu's work and betrayed him and his family to Ulube to get its power. When Ulube arrived to take the Gundam and use it for the military, Kyoji's mother died trying to protect her son. Kyoji took the Gundam to Earth where its programming was damaged and it captured Kyoji. However, he managed to make an android of himself to guide his younger brother Domon. Ulube used Domon and Rain to find the Devil Gundam.
43	"Royal Counterattack! Ambush of the Grand Gundam"; Transliteration: "Shishiōsōha! Gurandogandamu geigeki sakusen" (Japanese: 獅王争覇! グランドガンダム迎撃作戦)	February 17, 1995	October 11, 2002
After Chibodee and George have defeated the Grand Gundam, Allenby appears and seems to be under the influence of the DG cells, and Domon tries to reason with her. Then the Rising Gundam piloted by Rain attacks the Nobel Gundam.
44	"Schwarz Rests in Grace! Domon's Tearful Attack"; Transliteration: "Shubarutsu chiru! Domon namida no hissatsu ken" (Japanese: シュバルツ散る! ドモン涙の必殺拳)	February 24, 1995	October 14, 2002
Rain manages to save Allenby by destroying the Walter Gundam. Schwarz and Kyoji sacrifice themselves so Domon can destroy the Devil Gundam's cockpit, defeating it. It is also revealed that Wong was using Master Asia to get control of the Devil Gundam.
45	"Farewell Master: Master Asia's Last Breath"; Transliteration: "Saraba shishō! Masutā Ajia akatsuki ni shisu" (Japanese: さらば師匠! マスター・アジア暁に死す)	March 3, 1995	October 14, 2002
The final fight begins. Domon and Master Asia fight an extraordinary battle, and Domon convinces Master Asia's plans would've failed anyway. After defeating Master Asia, Domon shares one last moment with him, as they recite their litany, Master Asia dies in his arms.
46	"Rain's Crisis: Return of the Devil Gundam" "Rain's Crisis: Return of the Dark Gundam"; Transliteration: "Rein no kiki! Debirugandamu futatabi" (Japanese: レインの危機! デビルガンダムふたたび)	March 10, 1995	October 15, 2002
Domon buries the Master Gundam and Master Asia's body as a funeral, proclaiming it to be the last time he will shed tears for Master Asia. The Devil Gundam needs a Core Life Unit that can produce life to function at its full potential. Ulube plans to use Rain for the Core Life Unit, and shoots Dr Mikamura and offers Rain to the Devil Gundam as the Core Life Unit. Domon looks for Rain in the hospital, and instead finds Allenby, who tells him that Rain feels that she must make up for her father's sins, and therefore left for Neo Japan without him. After Dr Mikamura desperately radioes Domon for help, Domon attempts to go into space, but he is stopped by Wong and the Walter Gundam. However, Master Asia's Fuunsaiki appears and helps defeat both Wong and the Walter Gundam, and Domon arrives in space.
47	"Devil Colony Activated: Attack of the Shuffle Alliance" "Dark Colony Activated: Attack of the Shuffle Alliance"; Transliteration: "Debirukoronī shidō! Dai shingeki shaffuru dōmei" (Japanese: デビルコロニー始動! 大進撃シャッフル同盟)	March 17, 1995	October 15, 2002
Ulube now has the Devil Gundam at its full power, and declares war, ordering an immediate evacuation of the Neo Japan space colony. The Devil Gundam then absorbs the entire Neo Japan colony to become the Devil Gundam Colony. Domon and the members of the Shuffle Alliance join together to fight off the Devil Gundam Colony. Dr Mikamura then sacrifices himself to free Domon's father, Dr Kasshu, whose capsule is then recovered by the ship. Using his Bakunetsu God Finger, Domon creates an opening into the Devil Gundam Colony, and they enter.
48	"Earth's S.O.S.: Rescue Gundam Federation"; Transliteration: "Chikyū esuōesu! Shutsugeki Gandamu rengō!!" (Japanese: 地球SOS! 出撃ガンダム連合!!)	March 24, 1995	October 16, 2002
Domon's father is now out of his cryogenic state and says that to beat the Devil Gundam Domon must destroy the colony's power source. Gundams from around the world gather to defend the Earth from the Devil Gundam. Ulube meanwhile pilots the Grand Master Gundam which consists of the Master Gundam and the other members of the Four Heavenly Kings, created from the colony's power source. The Shuffle Alliance destroys Ulube with their combined power, but the Devil Gundam Colony does not stop. With no other choice, Domon's father tells him the only way is to destroy the Core Life Unit: Rain. Domon refuses, and leaves alone to search for Rain.
49	"God Gundam's Great Triumph: A Hopeful Future; Ready, Go!" "Burning Gundam's Great Triumph: A Hopeful Future; Ready, Go!"; Transliteration: "G (goddo) Gandamu dai shōri! Kibō no mirai e redi gō!!" (Japanese: G（ゴッド）ガンダム大勝利! 希望の未来へレディ・ゴーッ!!)	March 31, 1995	October 16, 2002
Thanks to the Devil Gundam's self-recovery the Grand Master Gundam is resurrected and the Shuffle Alliance struggle to defeat it. The Devil Gundam Colony begins extending towards Earth, taking over most of it. Almost taking complete control, it is defeated when Domon admits his love for Rain. This allows Rain to break free of the Devil Gundam's control, and together they perform the Erupting God Finger Sekiha Love-Love Tenkyoken technique, destroying the Devil Gundam for good. With the Earth now saved, Domon and Rain return to the planet with their friends to begin a new life together.
