= List of Mobile Fighter G Gundam characters =

This is a list of characters that appear in the Japanese anime television series Mobile Fighter G Gundam (機動武闘伝Gガンダム, Kidō Butōden Jī Gandamu; Mobile Fighting Legend G Gundam) and subsequent spin-offs.

== Shuffle Alliance ==
The Shuffle Alliance is a public team that watches humanity from the shadows and intervenes to prevent conflicts from escalating. It consists of five members: Domon Kasshu, Chibodee Crocket, Georges de Sand, Cai Caiqi, and Argo Gursky, who are the strongest fighters of their generation. Its name is derived from the fact that each member bears the crest of a playing card: King of Hearts, Queen of Spades, Jack of Diamonds, Ace of Clubs, and Black Joker. Their crest appears on their right hand as well as when they perform special attacks or are in an emotional state.

The original Shuffle Alliance consisted of Master Asia, Tris Sergeyrev (Black Joker), Nassius Kircher (Jack of Diamonds), Max Burns (Queen of Spades), and Alan Lee (Ace of Clubs) until Master Asia, who grew disillusioned following his victory in the 12th Gundam Fight, left after bestowing his title to Domon Kasshu. During the 13th Gundam Fight, the remaining members face Master Asia and Domon's friends Chibodee Crocket, Georges de Sand, Cai Caiqi, and Argo Gursky, who had been infected with the DG Cells, at Shinjuku. After sacrificing themselves to burn away the DG Cells and free them from the Dark Gundam, they bestow them with their crests before dying.

Domon Kasshu (ドモン・カッシュ, Domon Kasshu)
Voiced by: Tomokazu Seki (Japanese); Mark Gatha (English)
The main protagonist of the series. He is the pilot of the Shining Gundam and the God Gundam (Note: Burning Gundam in the English dub.) and the representative fighter of Neo-Japan. Before the 13th Gundam Fight, he spent ten years training under Master Asia, from whom he inherited the crest of King of Hearts. During the 13th Gundam Fight, he agrees to represent Neo-Japan and competes to find his brother Kyōji, who stole the JDG-009X Devil Gundam (Note: Dark Gundam in the English dub.) and free his father, Dr. Raizō Kasshu (ライゾウ・カッシュ, Raizō Kasshu), who was placed in cryogenic suspension for his involvement in the creation of the Devil Gundam.
Domon is short-tempered and determined, willing to do whatever it takes to complete his mission, and can be uncaring due to his dedication to the mission. He is dependent on Rain Mikamura, his childhood friend and his partner in the Gundam Fight, and the possibility of losing her makes him either snap or feel lost. Though he struggles to accept that Master Asia had allied with the Devil Gundam, he overcomes this and becomes a better fighter with help from his surrogate teacher Schwarz Bruder. Towards the end of the series, he learns the truth about the Devil Gundam incident and why Master Asia allied with the Devil Gundam. At the end of the series, he confesses his love to Rain, who agrees to live on Earth with him, and they later marry.
Chibodee Crocket (チボデー・クロケット, Chibodē Kuroketto)
Voiced by: Hōchū Ōtsuka (Japanese); Roger Rhodes (English)
Pilot of the Gundam Maxter and representative of Neo-America, whose fighting style is boxing. His support crew is the Chibodee Gals, consisting of Shirley, Janet, Bunny, and Cath. After his mother died, he grew up on the streets of his hometown of New York City before leaving for the Neo-America space colony and becoming its representative in the Gundam Fight. He becomes Domon's rival after losing to him in a Gundam Fight in New York City and fights him in Tokyo after being possessed by DG Cells, but is stopped by the Shuffle Alliance, who heal him, and becomes the Shuffle Alliance's new Queen of Spades. He had a fear of clowns due to an incident when he was young, which he overcomes after fighting an opponent dressed as a clown. Chibodee initially does not get along well with fellow Gundam Fighter/Shuffle Alliance member, Georges de Sand, who is his opposite in that they grew up in different financial classes and fight for different, pride-based reasons. However, they later work together to help Domon on Lantau Island. His special techniques include Burning Punch and Bursting Rail Machine-Gun Punch. He makes a guest appearance in chapter 122 of Karate Shōkōshi Kohinata Minoru.
Georges de Sand (ジョルジュ・ド・サンド, Joruju do Sando; romanized as George De Sand in North America)
Voiced by: Takumi Yamazaki (Japanese); Scott Roberts (English)
Pilot of the Gundam Rose and representative of Neo-France, whose fighting style is fencing. He is a member of the De Sand family, which is loyal to Neo-France and one of the few noble families remaining on Earth, and his support crew is his butler, Raymond Bishop. Georges considers himself to be a knight and fights for the pride of his nation and its princess, Maria Louise. In the past, he was involved in the Marseilles Tragedy, which occurred when he fought Jean Pierre Mirabeau in a competition to determine Neo-France's representative. After Jean Pierre Mirabeau stood in front of the crowd with his Mirage Gundam to prevent Georges from attacking, the King of Neo-France disqualified him for his dirty tactics and declared Georges the winner by default. Mirabeau attempted to kill the King in revenge; although Georges attempted to stop this, the Mirage Gundam's missiles redirected into the stands, killing thousands of spectators. Georges later becomes the Shuffle Alliance's new Jack of Diamonds and faces Mirabeau again when he escapes from a prison colony with help from the Devil Gundam. When Mirabeau arrives in Guyana, where Georges was training for the finals, he overcomes his fear of the Tragedy and uses his new power as the Jack of Diamonds to heal Mirabeau, who had been infected by the DG Cells. When the King refuses to allow him to fight Domon in the finals, he steals Gundam Rose from its hangar, risking his position as a Gundam Fighter and his family's honor. However, after seeing the match, the King admits that his decision was wrong and agrees to overlook the theft. Though he initially dislikes Domon when he interrupts a match and does get along with Chibodee Crockett, they later work together to help Domon on Lantau Island. His special techniques include Rose Screamers, Rose Bitz, and Rose Hurricane. His name is derived from George Sand.
Cai Caiqi (ja: サイ・サイシー / zh: 蔡蔡奇, Sai Saishī / Cài Càiqi; Sai Saici in North America)

Voiced by: Kappei Yamaguchi (Japanese); Zoe Slusar (English)
Pilot of the Dragon Gundam and representative of Neo-China, whose fighting style is shaolinquan; at 16 years old, he is the youngest Gundam Fighter. His support crew consists of the elderly Shaolin monks Zuizen and Keiun. When the colonies were formed, most of the Shaolin followers defected to the Chikurin temple. Because of this, he competes in the 13th Gundam Fight in order to convince the Neo-China government to revive the Shaolin Temple. In the past, his grandfather competed in the 4th Gundam Fight and his father was stricken with a terminal illness. When Domon first meets him, he is accused of attacking Neo-China, but in reality he was separated from the Dragon Gundam and used Domon to help him get it back. He later becomes the Shuffle Alliance's new Ace of Clubs. In the finals, he meets Cecile, whom he falls in love with, and learns that she is the sister of his upcoming opponent, Hans Holgar, Neo-Denmark's Gundam Fighter and pilot of the Mermaid Gundam. Although they part ways, they promise to reunite later. His special techniques include Dragon Fire, Feilong Flag, Houka Kyouten Juuzetsujin, and Shin Ryuusei Kochouken.
Argo Gursky (アルゴ・ガルスキー, Arugo Garusukī; romanized as Argo Gulskii in North America)
Voiced by: Hidenari Ugaki (Japanese); Stephen Holgate (English)
Pilot of the Bolt Gundam and representative of Neo-Russia, who uses grappling-style wrestling moves and, unlike many of his fellow Gundam Fighters, initially does not rely on special techniques. His support crew consists of his warden, Nastasha Zabigov, who was assigned to watch him after Neo-Russia was forced to change its tactics. In the past, he was a Space Pirate Captain and, though a criminal, valued life and did not kill. After being caught, he was forced to become Neo-Russia's Gundam Fighter to ensure the safety of his crew and had a bomb attached to his chest to prevent him from going out of line. Neo-Canada's Andrew Graham holds a grudge against him because he blames him for his wife's death, even though it was an accident. When he first meets Domon, he stages an escape to fight him after being disgusted by Neo-Russia's tactics of luring in Gundam Fighters and arresting them so that they do not have to fight. He later becomes the new Black Joker of the Shuffle Alliance and is older than the other new members. At the end of the series, Natasha deactivates his handcuffs and the bomb on his chest so that he can fight without holding back. His special techniques include the Gaia Crusher and Graviton Hammer.

== Support crews ==
Rain Mikamura (レイン・ミカムラ, Mikamura Rein)
Voiced by: Yuri Amano (Japanese); Jennifer Holder (English)
Domon's childhood friend, who is his partner and crew member for the 13th Gundam Fight and a skilled engineer and tactician, sharpshooter, and medic. Throughout the series, she falls in love with him until things change between them when she learns the truth from Schwarz about her father's involvement in the Devil Gundam incident. Afterwards, she returns to Neo-Japan, where her former boss, Major Wullube, kidnaps her and puts her in the cockpit of the Devil Gundam. However, she is freed through the combined efforts of Domon, the Shuffle Alliance, Allenby, and other Gundam Fighters, and Domon confessing his love to her allows her to break through her self-imposed emotional barriers and the Devil Gundam's control over her body. She also pilots the Shining Gundam and later the Rising Gundam during the Battle Royale. At the end of the series, she decides to live with Domon on Earth and they later marry.
The Chibodee Gals (チボデー・ギャルズ, Chibodē Gyaruzu)
Chibodee Crockett's support crew and cheerleading squad, which consists of Shirly Lane (シャリー・レーン, Sharī Rēn), Janet Smith (ジャネット・スミス, Janetto Sumisu), Cath Ronalee (キャス・ロナリー, Kyasu Ronarī), and Bunny Higgens (バニー・ビギンズ, Banī Biginzu). They were once street gang members who stowed away on a colonist ship and were almost caught until Chibodee saved them from the legal trouble they would have gotten into, with them serving him in order to repay the favor. However, their methods can be illegal, such as they go to the Guyana Highlands to steal the data on the Shining Gundam in order to encourage Chibodee to train. They, along with the crews of the Shuffle Alliance's members, support the Alliance from Argo's pirate ship during the final fight against the Devil Gundam.
Zuisen (瑞山; Ruìshān) and Keiun (恵雲; Huìyún)
Shaolin monks and martial artists who serve as Neo-China's support crew and as Cai Caiqi's surrogate guardians. They are old friends of Cai Caiqi's late father; before he died, they promised to raise his son to revive the Shaolin Temple, a task that they and Cai Caiqi take seriously. They come into conflict with Domon when they kidnap Rain in order to get him to defeat an impostor who stole the Dragon Gundam and posed as Cai Caiqi, and with Cai Caiqi when they plan to use Argo Gursky to fight Cai Caiqi, who had refused to train after their first encounter with the Devil Gundam, to get him back into training by fighting a strong opponent.
Maria Louise (マリアルイゼ, Maria Ruize; Marie Louise in the English dub)
Voiced by: Yumi Tōma (Japanese); Chris Simms (English)
The tomboyish 14-year-old daughter of Neo-France's current ruler and its princess, who is in love with Georges de Sand. When Georges initially refuses a match with Domon, Maria, with help from Domon, stages her own kidnapping in order to get Georges to consent to a match: Domon for the sake of a fight, and for Maria to feel as though Georges was fighting for her alone. Both get what they wanted, and Georges reveals that he knew it was staged, since Domon would not have been able to write the ransom note in French. Though her father sends her back to the Neo-France colony as punishment for the incident, she later returns during the finals. She eventually matures enough to help the Shuffle Alliance in their quest to destroy the Devil Gundam. When she witnesses the undead Chapman murder a Neo-England official, she and the other members of the Neo-France team are held at gunpoint as Michelo deactivates the part of the barrier that protected them from Chapman during his match against Georges. After Georges protects them while Domon, Rain, and Allenby fix the barrier system and reactivate the barrier, she identifies Wong as the other man involved in the murder by recognizing his ring, but her father tells her to forget the incident because of Wong's position. She later helps in standing up to her father's selfish decision of not having Georges fight against Domon in the finals, aids the support crews in breaking down an energy barrier in order to allow Rain and Schwarz to deliver the truth to Domon during the Battle Royale, and assists the Shuffle Alliance during the final fight against the Devil Gundam by wielding a gun turret.
Raymond Bishop (レイモンド・ビショップ, Reimondo Bishoppu)
Georges de Sand's butler, caretaker, and fencing teacher, who has served the de Sand family for a long time. He tells Domon and Rain about Georges's fight after his experience with the Devil Gundam and he is willing to risk his career to see his mental state return to normal, as it changed following the Marseilles tragedy. Georges fires him after learning of this, but later rehires him after he helps save Georges from Mirabeau. He pilots his custom NEL-75C Butler mobile suit, mainly for training with Georges when he pilots Gundam Rose. Although it is ruined during the battle against Mirabeau, it is repaired and used to retrieve Dr. Kasshu's space capsule.
Natasha Zabigov (ナスターシャ・ザビコフ, Nasutāsha Zabikofu)
Argo Gursky's prison warden, who oversees Neo-Russian matters in the Gundam Fight. Though bent on winning by any means to secure victory, she helps the Shuffle Alliance and warms up to Argo, admitting her equal disgust towards Neo-Russia's methods. By the end of the Gundam Fight, Nastasha releases Argo and his crew, stealing the Neo-Russian ship that they were brought in to battle the Devil Gundam.

== Devil Gundam Corps ==
Kyōji Kasshu (キョウジ・カッシュ, Kyōji Kasshu)
Voiced by: Hideyuki Hori (Japanese); Matt Embry (English)
Domon's older brother, whom he has been searching for due to believing that he created the Devil Gundam and betrayed their family and nation when he fled to Earth. In reality, Dr. Kasshu and Kyōji developed the Devil Gundam, which was originally called the Ultimate Gundam, to terraform the Earth and give it life. When Major Wullube Ishikawa of the Neo-Japanese military, who wanted to use the Ultimate Gundam for his own purposes, attempted to confiscate it, Dr. Kasshu told Kyōji to take it to Earth to prevent the military from obtaining it. As he fled from Neo-Japan's military to Earth, Domon's mother was fatally shot while shielding Kyōji from gunfire, while his father was sentenced as a scapegoat. The force of landing on Earth corrupted the Ultimate Gundam's programming, causing it to believe that killing all humans was the only way to save the Earth. It then absorbed Kyōji as its core, infecting him with DG Cells and using him to do its bidding. Before losing his free will, Kyōji used the DG Cells on the corpse of the fighter of Neo Germany, who had been killed by the Devil Gundam, and reanimated it as Schwarz Bruder, an android created in his image.
When Domon reunites with Kyōji at the ruins of Shinjuku and attempts to reason with him, he has become a shell of his former self. Due to the interference of Schwarz Bruder, Domon gains the courage to take on his brother again and seemingly kills him during their battle at the Guyana Highlands. However, the Devil Gundam survives and Wong brings it to Neo-Hong Kong, where Wong and Master Asia search for a new life core unit to replace Kyōji as its core due to him being near death. During the Battle Royale on Lantau Island, Schwarz attempts to remove Kyōji from the weakened Devil Gundam, but is forced to take his creator's place as he orders Domon to kill them. Having reconciled with his brother, Domon incinerates him and Schwarz with Sekiha Tenkyoken, seemingly destroying the Devil Gundam.
Master Asia, The Undefeated of the East (東方不敗マスター・アジア, Tōhōfuhai Masutā Ajia)
Voiced by: Yōsuke Akimoto (Japanese); David Pettitt (English)
A legendary martial artist and winner of the previous Gundam Fight after defeating Gentle Chapman and Wullube, as well as Domon's mentor. He was a member of the original Shuffle Alliance as the King of Hearts before he bestowed his crest upon Domon and left, disappearing for some time. When Domon reunites with him, they unite to fight the Death Army, but become enemies when he allies with the Devil Gundam. Despite this, he still cares for Domon, as he taught him his ultimate technique to allow him to defeat Schwarz Bruder, who he believed to be Kyōji and knew he would not stand a chance against. The Gundam he used to win the previous Gundam Fight, Kowloon Gundam, transforms into the Master Gundam. Master Asia also has a horse, Fuun Saiki, which uses a mobile unicorn robot controlled similarly to how Gundams are controlled by human fighters and which Master Gundam uses as a steed.
Though he represents Neo-Hong Kong, Master Asia does not join the Gundam Fight until the final round, as per the ruling of the Chairman of All Space, Wong Yunfat. Upon hearing this, Domon vows to make it to the final round undefeated so that he can take Master Asia's title as Undefeated of the East. Despite his allegiance to the Dark Gundam, Master Asia retains his honor as a fighter, which puts him at odds with Wong because he uses dirty tactics to win.
Having been diagnosed with a terminal illness and knowing that he will die soon, decides to have Domon fight against the strongest opponents during the final matches of the tournament in order to groom him into taking over the Devil Corps and becoming the Devil Gundam's pilot. Master Asia's wish is that Domon will help restore Earth to a pre-humanity state using the nanotechnology from the Devil Gundam. During the 12th Gundam Fight, Master Asia had grown disillusioned with the horrors that Earth endured during the Gundam Fight and that he had contributed to it. To atone for this, he becomes a follower of the Devil Gundam, seeing it as the hope to reverse the damage done. He is the only member of the Devil Corps to pilot a Heavenly King without infection, as his terminal illness prevented him from being absorbed by the Devil Gundam as he originally intended. He dies peacefully after Domon defeats him in the finals, having been convinced by his words that his plan would have failed since he did not consider that mankind is part of nature. Along with Kyōji, Schwarz, and Domon's mother, he appears in Domon's vision during the battle against Grand Master Gundam, where they urge Domon not to give up.
The title "Tohofuhai" (東方不敗) is derived from Dongfang Bubai, an antagonist in the Hong Kong wuxia novel The Smiling, Proud Wanderer.
Wong Yunfat (ウォン・ユンファ, Won Yunfa; 黄潤發)
Voiced by: Kōichi Hashimoto (Japanese); Ben Jeffery (English)
The Prime Minister of Neo-Hong Kong and the current leader of Earth, who secretly plans to use the Devil Gundam to maintain his power and is in league with Master Asia. He recruits Gentle Chapman and Michelo Chariot, who had been disqualified, to defeat Domon by rigging his matches and pitting him against tough opponents. While researching the Devil Gundam, he detailed his findings in a report about a female pilot being the key to unleashing the Devil Gundam's full potential, which Wullube, Neo-Japan's Major, later obtained. Wong attempts to use Allenby Beardsley as a puppet in his plans by forcing her into the Berserker System to pilot the Walter Gundam, but is killed during the battle between Rain and Allenby. After being revived by the DG Cells, he heads for space in the Walter Gundam in pursuit of Wullube, who had taken the Devil Gundam. There, he confronts Domon, who was heading for the Neo-Japan space colony where the Devil Gundam was taken, and attempts to stop him from breaching the atmosphere, but is killed by the God Gundam's God Finger.
The character is named after and inspired by Hong Kong actor Chow Yun-fat. His appearance is modeled after Chow's characters Mark from A Better Tomorrow (1986) and Ko Chun from God of Gamblers (1989), while his habit of eating chocolate is inspired by Ko Chun's similar habit.
Gentle Chapman (ジェントル・チャップマン, Jentoru Chappuman)
Voiced by: Kazuhiro Nakata (Japanese); Kurtis Sanheim (English)
The representative fighter of Neo-England and the pilot of Britain Gundam and John Bull Gundam. (Note: Royal Gundam in the English dub.) He is a veteran of Gundam Fights and possesses great fighting experience, having participated in Gundam Fights for twenty years and winning three consecutive Gundam fights for Neo-England before Master Asia defeated him in the 12th Gundam Fight. In order to remain a hero and inspiration to the people, he becomes addicted to stimulants and resorts to cheating tactics with the help of his wife, Manon, but despite this still speaks of the ugly truths of life and what it means to be a fighter. After dying from a drug overdose during his match against Domon, he is revived by the DG Cells as a shell of his former self acting on the orders of another member of the Devil Corps. His Gundam gains the ability to become the Grand Gundam, one of the Four Heavenly Kings, but he is killed by Chibodee Crocket and Georges de Sand.
Michelo Chariot (ミケロ・チャリオット, Mikero Chariotto)
The representative fighter of Neo-Italy and the pilot of Neros Gundam, who is one of the few Gundam Fighters from Earth, as he comes from Rome. He is ruthless and persistent in his goals and, unlike most Gundam fighters, cares little for rules and sportsmanship. He often drinks alcohol.
A gang leader from Rome, he uses his position as a Gundam Fighter to do what he wants, since a Gundam fighter cannot be charged for crimes involving the destruction of property on Earth. He was chosen by his home nation to represent them because of his fighting prowess, but in the manga, Officer Mezzina mentions that he could have bribed someone. After Domon intervenes to save Sophia, a young girl he was holding hostage, he attempts to kill Domon with Neros Gundam before challenging him when he summons the Shining Gundam. After Neros' head is destroyed by the Shining Finger, disqualifying him from the Fight, he becomes obsessed with destroying Domon and later returns in the finals, having 'sold his soul' to the Devil Gundam to gain power. Throughout the finals, Michelo acts as a middleman for Wong, attempting to turn Gundam fighters against the Shuffle Alliance and controlling Chapman's activities. As such, Wong often refers to Michelo affectionately, but Master Asia disregards Michelo as little more than a pawn. His Gundam gains the ability to become the Gundam Heaven's Sword, one of the Four Heavenly Kings, but he is killed by Cai Caiqi and Argo Gursky.

== Neo-Japan ==
Wullube Ishikawa (ウルベ・イシカワ, Urube Ishikawa; romanized as Ulube Ishikawa in North America)
A major in Neo-Japan's military, who was formerly a Gundam Fighter and competed in the 12th Gundam Fight. He was the mastermind behind the Devil Gundam incident, when he led the siege against Kyōji that resulted in him receiving a facial scar. After framing Kyōji and using Dr. Kasshu as a scapegoat, Wullube recovered Dr. Kasshu's research notes and was convinced by Dr. Mikamura that the Devil Gundam would reappear during the 13th Gundam Fight. Using Dr. Kasshu's son, Domon, and Dr. Mikamura's daughter, Rain, as pawns, they aim to track down the Devil Gundam using the Gundam Fight as a cover, with Wullube faking sympathy toward Domon and doing favors for him. Following Kyōji's death and the rediscovery of the Devil Gundam, Wullube uses Wong's notes to complete his agenda, making Rain the Devil Gundam's new life core unit as it absorbs the Neo-Japan Colony. After she is saved, Wullube willingly merges with the Devil Gundam's DG Cells, losing his mind and body in the process, to fight the Shuffle Alliance in the Grand Master Gundam. However, he is killed when they combine their energy and use a team attack to destroy the Grand Master Gundam.
Dr. Mikamura (ミカムラ, Mikamura)
Voiced by: Motomu Kiyokawa (Japanese); Byron Close (English)
A friend of Dr. Kasshu and Rain's father, who was the original developer of the Shining Gundam. His jealousy towards Dr. Kasshu caused him to betray him during the Devil Gundam Incident, which he feels great guilt about. While trying to silence a wounded Schwarz, Mikamura exposes himself to Rain, who was in the room at the time and reveals herself after learning the truth. Rain convinces him that his foolishness caused the Kasshu family to suffer, causing him to reconsider his actions. After helping Allenby recover from the DG Cells, Mikamura apologizes to Rain while revealing that he intends to turn himself in for his crimes and admitting that he does not deserve to be her father. However, after Wullube reveals to Mikamura his intentions with Rain, Mikamura is shot while helping her escape. Before he dies, he releases Dr. Kasshu's capsule into space so they can have a chance against the Devil Gundam and asks Domon to save Rain and tell her to not blame herself for his past actions.

== Other characters ==
Schwarz Bruder (シュバルツ・ブルーダー, Shubarutsu Burūdā)
Voiced by: Hideyuki Hori (Japanese); Matt Embry (English)
The mysterious Gundam fighter of Neo-Germany and ally of the Shuffle Alliance, who pilots the Gundam Spiegel (Note: Shadow Gundam in the English dub.) and is a skilled fighter. He first appears in the Shinjuku area of Tokyo after it is revealed that Master Asia has allied with the Devil Gundam. After the Devil Gundam withdraws from Neo-Japan, Schwarz helps train Domon. During the final tournament, Schwarz is injured during a match with Domon and is unmasked, revealing that he looks physically identical to Kyōji. Earlier in the tournament, the Devil Gundam defeated the real Schwarz. Using the last of his free will, Kyōji used the DG Cells to transform Schwarz's corpse into an android modeled after himself, assigning him to protect Domon. During the Battle Royale on Lantau Island, the Gundam Spiegel is destroyed when Schwarz faces the Devil Gundam before Schwarz is killed by Domon using God Gundam to destroy the Devil Gundam.
Allenby Beardsley (アレンビー・ビアズリー, Arenbī Biazurī)
Voiced by: Narumi Hidaka (Japanese); Carol-Anne Day (English)
The representative fighter for Neo-Sweden and pilot of the Nobel Gundam, (Note: Noble Gundam in the English dub.) which is modeled after the sailor fuku uniform. She is the youngest fighter and the only female fighter in the tournament. She was orphaned at a young age and taken in by the Neo-Swedish Space Forces, spending much of her early life training. Her strength comes from military experiments conducted to create the perfect Gundam fighter. The Berserker System uses radio frequencies to boost her fighting abilities, but at the cost of her going berserk. Due to the controversy of using such a system, she remained relatively obscure until Wong Yunfat put her against Domon to test her abilities.
Allenby first meets Domon at an arcade, where she beats everyone in a fighting simulator, but ties with Domon. During her match with him, Domon overloads the Berserker System by reaching out to Allenby. When the resulting trauma causes Allenby to lose the match, the technicians behind the system discontinue its use, reasoning that she no longer needs it. Over time, she befriends Domon, bonding with him over the fact that they were forced to become Gundam Fighters against their will, and develops a crush on him, causing Rain to be jealous of her. Master Asia at first thought Allenby was just a fighter who gets lucky, but after a match with Domon, Master Asia admits he was wrong about her and he thinks she has what it takes to be a great fighter. Allenby finds a common bond with Domon due to the fact that they became Gundam Fighters against their will.
Wong later makes a copy of the Berserker System and uses it to disrupt Allenby's tag team match against Andrew Graham and Argo Gursky. Following the match, he kidnaps her and infects her with DG Cells, using the Berserker System to have her pilot the Walter Gundam. After being cured of the DG Cells, she later returns with Chyral to lead an attack against the Devil Gundam. In the final episode she, along with the Shuffle Alliance members, helps Domon destroy the Devil Gundam and express his true feelings to Rain. By the end of the series, she is the sole surviving member of the Four Heavenly Kings.
Chyral Mequirel (キラル・メキレル, Kiraru Mekireru; romanized as Kyral Mekirel in North America)
The representative fighter for Neo-Nepal and the pilot of the Tantora Gundam and Mandala Gundam. He is a returning fighter from the 11th Fight, during which he lost to Gentle Chapman and his John Bull Gundam, who defeated him and became a three-time Gundam Fight Champion, and an explosion rendered him blind. He returns during the 13th Fight to take revenge against the fighters using the Mandala Gundam. Under the orders of the Nepalese government, he assassinates all Gundam fighters he was slated to face before the match and nearly kills Domon before Chibodee stops him. During his match against Domon, he realizes the error of his ways and withdraws from the Gundam Fight to seek atonement from the families of the people he murdered. He later returns along with Allenby and other Gundam fighters to assist the Shuffle Alliance in attacking the Devil Gundam. He also appeared as a playable character in Super Robot Wars MX and its PSP port, Super Robot Wars MX Portable.
Andrew Graham (アンドリュー・グラハム, Andoryū Gurahamu)
The representative fighter for Neo-Canada and pilot of the Lumber Gundam. (Note: Grizzly Gundam in the English dub.) In the past, when Argo Gursky and his pirate crew were escaping from the space police, their ship collided with the station where Andrew and his wife, Norma, were working as space police. Despite Argo's attempt to rescue her, Norma died after being sucked out into space, which he blamed Argo for. He competes in the 13th Gundam Fight in order to seek revenge and fights Argo after Domon facilitates an unofficial match between them, which ends in a draw. Afterwards, Natasha explains that Neo-Russia' ruled Norma's death as an accident, though Andrew refuses to believe this. After he returns to fight Argo in the finals and they are matched against Allenby, he realizes the error of his ways and protects Argo from Allenby's attacks. However, this causes him to become crippled, and, no longer able to pilot a Gundam, he returns Neo-Canada for medical treatment.
Stalker (ストーカー, Sutōkā)
He appears at the beginning of each episode from the second episode onwards to provide information about the plot of the episode and provide information about the universe of Mobile Fighter G Gundam. He also narrates the episode previews.
