= Yoshifumi Ushima =

Japanese singer-songwriter (1966–2022)

- Born: 9 September 1966; Sukumo, Kōchi Prefecture, Japan
- Died: 7 August 2022 (aged 55)
- Other names: Yû Sakata

Yoshifumi Ushima (Japanese: 鵜島仁文; 9 September 1966 - 7 August 2022) was a Japanese singer-songwriter, composer, guitarist, arranger and music producer.

== Life and career ==
Born in Sukumo, Ushima made his professional debut in 1994 composing and performing "Flying in the Sky", the opening theme of the anime series Mobile Fighter G Gundam; he later wrote and performed other songs for the anime, notably the second opening theme "Trust You Forever", as well as songs of other anime series and films. Ushima also served as composer and songwriter for other artists, notably Chihiro Yonekura, AKB48, Yusuke, and Shinnosuke Furumoto.

Ushima died on 7 August 2022 due to ruptured esophageal varices caused by chronic cirrhosis, at the age of 55. A commemorative concert featuring MIQ and Yurika, among others, was held on 22 September 2022 in Tokyo.

== Discography ==
Albums

- 1995 - Free Judgement
- 1996 - Sleepless Dreamer
- 2007 - FIRE BIRD
- 2018 - EARTH WIND

Singles

- 1994 - FLYING IN THE SKY
- 1994 - Trust You Forever
- 1995 - BACK TO THE GROUND
