= Mobile Fighter G Gundam =

Japanese anime television series

- 機動武闘伝Gガンダム
- Genre: Mecha; Wuxia; Military science fiction
- Created by: Hajime Yatate; Yoshiyuki Tomino
- Directed by: Yasuhiro Imagawa (chief)
- Series composition: Fuyunori Gobu
- Character designer: Hiroshi Ōsaka
- Music by: Kohei Tanaka
- No. of episodes: 49 (list of episodes)

Production
- Producers: Masahiko Minami (TV Asahi); Yoshiaki Koizumi (Sunrise); Masuo Ueda (Sunrise)
- Production companies: TV Asahi; Sunrise

Original release
- Network: ANN (TV Asahi)
- Release: April 22, 1994 – March 31, 1995

Related
Further information
Manga
Written by	Kōichi Tokita
Published by	Kodansha
English publisher	NA: Tokyopop
Magazine	Comic BonBon
Original run	April 1994 – April 1995
Volumes	3
Light novel
Written by	Yoshitake Suzuki
Published by	Kadokawa Shoten
Imprint	Kadokawa Sneaker Bunko
Original run	August 29, 1995 – March 1, 1997
Volumes	3
Manga
Kidō Butōden G Gundam Gaiden Shōryū Densetsu
Written by	Toshiya Murakami
Published by	Kodansha
Magazine	Deluxe BonBon
Original run	December 1994 – April 1995
Volumes	1
Manga
Kidō Butōden Gaiden Gundam Fight 7th
Written by	Kitarou Ototoi
Published by	Kodansha
Magazine	Comic BonBon Special Edition
Original run	March 1996 – December 1996
Volumes	1
Manga
Chōkyū! Kidō Butōden G Gundam
Written by	Yasuhiro Imagawa
Illustrated by	Kazuhiko Shimamoto
Published by	Kadokawa Shoten
Magazine	Gundam Ace
Original run	July 26, 2010 – August 26, 2011
Volumes	7
Manga
Shinjuku Tōhō Fuhai!
Written by	Yasuhiro Imagawa
Illustrated by	Kazuhiko Shimamoto
Published by	Kadokawa Shoten
Magazine	Gundam Ace
Original run	September 26, 2011 – January 26, 2013
Volumes	8
Manga
Bakunetsu Neo Hong Kong!
Written by	Yasuhiro Imagawa
Illustrated by	Kazuhiko Shimamoto
Published by	Kadokawa Shoten
Magazine	Gundam Ace
Original run	February 26, 2013 – 2015
Volumes	7
Manga
Saishū Kessen-hen
Written by	Yasuhiro Imagawa
Illustrated by	Kazuhiko Shimamoto
Published by	Kadokawa Shoten
Magazine	Gundam Ace
Original run	2015 – August 26, 2016
Volumes	4

Mobile Fighter G Gundam, also known in Japan as Mobile Fighting Legend G Gundam (機動武闘伝Gガンダム, Kidō Butōden Jī Gandamu) (and commonly referred to as simply G Gundam), is a 1994 Japanese animated television series produced by Sunrise and the fifth installment in the long-running Gundam franchise. The series is set in the "Future Century", where space colonies representing countries have agreed to hold an organized fighting tournament known as the "Gundam Fight" every four years to settle their political differences in place of war. Each colony sends a representative fighter piloting a giant, humanoid mecha called a Gundam to battle on Earth until only one is left, and the winning nation earns the right to govern over all the colonies until the next tournament. The events of G Gundam follow Domon Kasshu, the pilot of Neo Japan's Shining Gundam during the 13th Gundam Fight. Domon's mission is to both win the tournament and to track down his older brother, who is believed to have stolen the mysterious Devil Gundam (AKA the Dark Gundam outside of Japan/Asia) from the Neo Japan government.

Commemorating the 15th anniversary of the Gundam brand, G Gundam was produced to reboot the waning popularity of the long-running franchise. It is the first Gundam series with a self-contained plot set in an alternate calendar era from the original "Universal Century" timeline. Additionally, the show casts aside many of the conventions set by its predecessors and takes many new steps for its franchise, such as a focus on martial arts and decisive, personal duels as opposed to large-scale military conflicts. G Gundam was directed by Yasuhiro Imagawa, with its settings and characters significantly influenced by the director's interest in world cinema. The anime's real-world locales were drawn from numerous foreign films and were planned using location scouting. G Gundam ran for 49 episodes on Japan's TV Asahi from April 22, 1994, to March 31, 1995. An English-language version produced by Bandai Entertainment aired in the United States on Cartoon Network's Toonami block beginning on August 5, 2002. Since its original broadcast, G Gundam has spawned manga, audio albums, video games, guide books, and several lines of scale models.

During its conception and Japanese television debut, G Gundam was met with controversy among its production staff, sponsors, and fans because the show takes a wildly different turn from all previous entries in the Gundam universe. However, for that very reason, the series is cited as a milestone in its long-running franchise and ultimately proved very popular in the region. Reception for G Gundam has been generally positive in North America. Reviewers praised the primary characters and mecha as unique and stylized, but strongly disagreed on the plot. While some critics enjoyed the bold and campy divergence from the more dramatic social and political undertones traditional of Gundam, others found G Gundam's story diffusely shallow, repetitive, or not up to standards set by its anime predecessors.

== Plot ==
Unlike previous series in the Gundam franchise which are set in the "Universal Century" timeline, Mobile Fighter G Gundam takes place in an alternate "Future Century" universe. Within this timeline, much of mankind has abandoned a ruined Earth to live in space colonies. The countries on Earth have corresponding colonies just outside the planet's atmosphere. Rather than fight wars for political and social dominance, the colonies agree to hold a "Gundam Fight" tournament every four years. Each country sends to Earth a representative piloting a highly advanced, humanoid mobile fighter called a Gundam. The Gundams compete with one another in one-on-one battles, under a strict set of rules, until only one fighter remains; the nation represented by the winner earns the right to rule all of space for that period. Each Gundam is controlled directly by the user within the cockpit using the "Mobile Trace System", a gesture recognition and feedback mechanism whereby the Gundam mimics the pilot's own body motion, combat skills, and weapon-wielding capabilities. G Gundam opens at the start of the 13th Gundam Fight in Future Century year 60 and follows Neo Japan's Domon Kasshu, fighter of his nation's Shining Gundam and bearer of the coveted "King of Hearts" martial arts crest. Aside from winning the tournament, Domon's mission is to track down his fugitive, older brother Kyoji, who allegedly stole the experimental Devil Gundam from Neo Japan's government, leaving their mother dead and their father (Dr. Raizo Kasshu) to be arrested and sentenced to cryostasis.

Under orders from Major Ullube Ishikawa, Domon and his childhood friend and mechanic Rain Mikamura travel from country to country, challenging each one's Gundam while searching for clues to the whereabouts of Kyoji and the Devil Gundam. Domon's initial matches with Neo America's Chibodee Crocket, Neo France's George DeSand, Neo China's Sai Sai Ci, and Neo Russia's Argo Gulskii end in draws, gaining mutual respect among the fighters. As they encounter Gundam pilots who had come in contact with the Devil Gundam, Domon and Rain learn of its unique cellular properties to regenerate, multiply, and evolve by infecting organic matter and causing violent behavior in living things. The duo then journey to Neo Tokyo, a city decimated by the Devil Gundam's army of mobile weapons. Domon reunites with his esteemed martial arts instructor Master Asia, who is also the champion of the last Gundam Fight, the former King of Hearts, and one-time leader of an elite group of Gundam fighters called the Shuffle Alliance. After Domon and Rain help the city's survivors defend their last outpost in Shinjuku, Master Asia reveals himself as a servant of the Devil Gundam, having also gained control over Chibodee, George, Sai Sai Ci, and Argo using Devil Gundam (DG) cells. The four remaining members of the Shuffle Alliance intervene and vow to destroy their previous leader for his crimes. Ultimately, the Alliance members offer their lives in purging the DG cells from Domon's four comrades and bestow each of them with a Shuffle Alliance crest as their successors. Kyoji and the enormous Devil Gundam eventually appear from beneath the ground of Shinjuku but shortly thereafter vanish alongside Master Asia. As the Shuffle Alliance trains in the Guiana Highlands for the Gundam Fight finals, Master Asia and the Devil Gundam reappear. With the help of his friends and a new ally in Neo Germany's masked warrior Schwarz Bruder, Domon defeats the Devil Gundam. When the Shining Gundam becomes incapacitated during the battle, Domon desperately manages to activate a newly acquired God Gundam, escape Master Asia, and make his way to the finals set in Neo Hong Kong.

The Gundam Fight finals are presided over by Wong Yunfat, Neo Hong Kong's prime minister, and the current ruler of the space colonies and Earth. Wong chooses to have the qualifying nations battle in one-on-one and tag team preliminary matches to reach a battle royale on Lantau Island, where the tournament is to end with the winner facing the defending champion Master Asia. Having gained possession of the Devil Gundam, Wong secretly plots to revive and control it as his trump card to inevitably maintain his own power over space. Domon and his companions make their way to the battle royale while several truths concerning the Devil Gundam are unveiled. Rain's father, Dr. Mikamura, eventually explains that the Devil Gundam (originally called the Ultimate Gundam) was constructed by Dr. Kasshu to rejuvenate the dying Earth. Jealous of his genius colleague, Dr. Mikamura had Neo Japan's officials attempt to confiscate Kasshu's creation. To prevent the military from using his father's invention for its own agenda, Kyoji fled with and crash-landed the Gundam on Earth, where its computer malfunctioned, triggering its malevolent activity. Ullube subsequently had Dr. Kasshu arrested, framed Kyoji as a criminal, and used Domon and Rain as pawns in recovering the Gundam. In a separate confession, Master Asia discloses to Domon that, having been distressed by the utter destruction wrought by the Gundam Fights, he planned to use the Devil Gundam to wipe out humanity and allow Earth to heal naturally. The battle on Lantau Island culminates with Domon fatally besting Master Asia in a final confrontation, while Kyoji and Schwarz sacrifice themselves so that Domon can attack the Devil Gundam's cockpit and disable it once again. Though the schemes of both Wong and Master Asia are foiled, Ullube quietly claims the Devil Gundam and transports it to Neo Japan's space colony for his own purpose. Having been corrupted by DG cells with ambitions of supreme power, Ullube kidnaps Rain and places her into the Devil Gundam's core to act as its energy source. The hulking monstrosity then merges with the colony and begins absorbing Earth itself. As the entire world's Gundams unite to assault the Devil Gundam from the outside, the Shuffle Alliance breaks inside the colony and destroys Ullube. Finally, Domon professes his love for Rain and releases her from the core. Invoking the power of the King of Hearts, the couple vanquishes the Devil Gundam once and for all.

== Production ==
=== Staff and conception ===
Mobile Fighter G Gundam was produced by Sunrise in association with advertising agencies Sotsu and Dentsu, and toy company Bandai. The series was created to commemorate the 15th anniversary of the Gundam franchise, created by Yoshiyuki Tomino in 1979. G Gundam was directed by Yasuhiro Imagawa, known for his work on the Giant Robo and Getter Robo Armageddon original video animations (OVAs). G Gundam was chiefly written and supervised by Yoshitake Suzuki (using his pen name "Fuyunori Gobu"), a veteran screenwriter for various Sunrise properties such as Reideen the Brave, Shippū! Iron Leaguer and The King of Braves GaoGaiGar. Many of the principal production crew members for G Gundam were carried over the previous season's Mobile Suit Victory Gundam, including character designer Hiroshi Ōsaka and mechanical designers Kunio Okawara and Hajime Katoki. Manga artist Kazuhiko Shimamoto collaborated on the show's character designs. Kimitoshi Yamane acted as a back-up mechanical designer and has since worked on Sunrise's acclaimed series Cowboy Bebop and The Vision of Escaflowne. Hirotoshi Sano, previously credited for Tekkaman Blade, was responsible for directing the mechanical animation in G Gundam, but also produced much of show's promotional artwork seen on home media covers. The musical score for G Gundam was composed by Kohei Tanaka. The opening theme song "Flying in the Sky" performed by Yoshifumi Ushima and the closing theme "Umi Yori mo Fukaku" (海よりも深く; "Deeper Than The Ocean") by Etsuko Sai are played for the first 25 episodes of the series. The opening theme "Trust You Forever" by Ushima and the closing theme "Kimi no Naka no Eien" (君の中の永遠; "The Eternity in You") by Takehide Inoue are played for the remaining episodes.

Like other early mecha anime, the Mobile Suit Gundam franchise was backed by sponsors whose main interest was having television programs advertise plastic models and toys. Gundam fiction set itself apart from others in the same genre with its dramatic plot devices, morally complex characters, and depictions of the horrors of war. These aspects, combined with its "Real Robot" mecha approach, made Gundam immensely popular for several years. After the broadcast of Victory Gundam beginning in 1993, Imagawa, a young protégé of Tomino, was selected as the director of the next installment in the franchise, titled Polcarino Gundam. However, as Gundam popularity dwindled and sales began to drop by this time, the sponsors forced the creators to reboot the brand with the newly titled Mobile Fighter G Gundam. Conceived as a less realistic "Super Robot" series, G Gundam abandoned its military roots and was aimed at younger viewers to increase toy sales, while also pulling from the then-recent popularity of fighting games such as Street Fighter II and shonen manga at time. Alterations including a lack of a warfare-centered plot, Gundams stereotypically based on nationality, and Earth as a ring were originally seen as blasphemous to Imagawa and much of Sunrise's staff. Notwithstanding, Imagawa became more supportive of the changes after seeing some impressive, complex designs in G Gundam's sponsor-created toys. He eventually settled into his position, taking advice from his mentor. "If you continue to make a copy of a copy of a copy," he stated, "eventually the image degrades to nothing." Imagawa thought it was important for creators and sponsors to buy into each other's ideas for the benefit of a product's success. The director also commented that in order to sell a product like G Gundam to an audience resistant of such ambitious changes, creators must instill their own personalities to overcome hardships and make the work unique. By the end of production, Imagawa considered it meaningless to compare G Gundam to other parts of the franchise and disregarded the concept of a "conventional" Gundam series. "This is MY Gundam," he proclaimed, "And I've made a Gundam that I can be proud of."

=== Influences ===
As a film fanatic, Imagawa perceived that referencing world cinema would help illustrate the real world settings in G Gundam. The production staff primarily wished to utilize sightseeing guide books, but found that these books did not show the locations from the perspective of everyday people. The battlegrounds in the first several episodes were conveyed using a number of multimedia works including films by Federico Fellini, Woody Allen, Alfred Hitchcock, and Yılmaz Güney; films based on Wong Fei-hung; video clips of the band Swing Out Sister; music by the groups Genesis and Magma; and scenery from Monty Python acts. Each episode's introductory narration, provided by the character Stalker, was inspired by American television dramas such as Star Trek and The Twilight Zone. In the same manner, certain G Gundam character names and their techniques were drawn from films, most prominently the Hong Kong wuxia genre. For instance, the alternate name of antagonist Master Asia, Tōhō Fuhai (東方不敗; "Undefeated of the East"), is named directly after the protagonist of a film of the same title. Additionally, the villain Wong Yunfat is based heavily on Hong Kong star Chow Yun-fat, specifically the actor's appearance in the film God of Gamblers. Some elements in G Gundam were taken from other anime and manga. A key scene at the series midpoint involving the Shining Gundam's gold-colored "Super Mode" was inspired by Saint Seiya. Another instance towards the show's climax, where the hero's rivals join him to fight a greater opposing force, was a commonly used motif in Weekly Shōnen Jump comics, most notably Ring ni Kakero.

=== Design ===
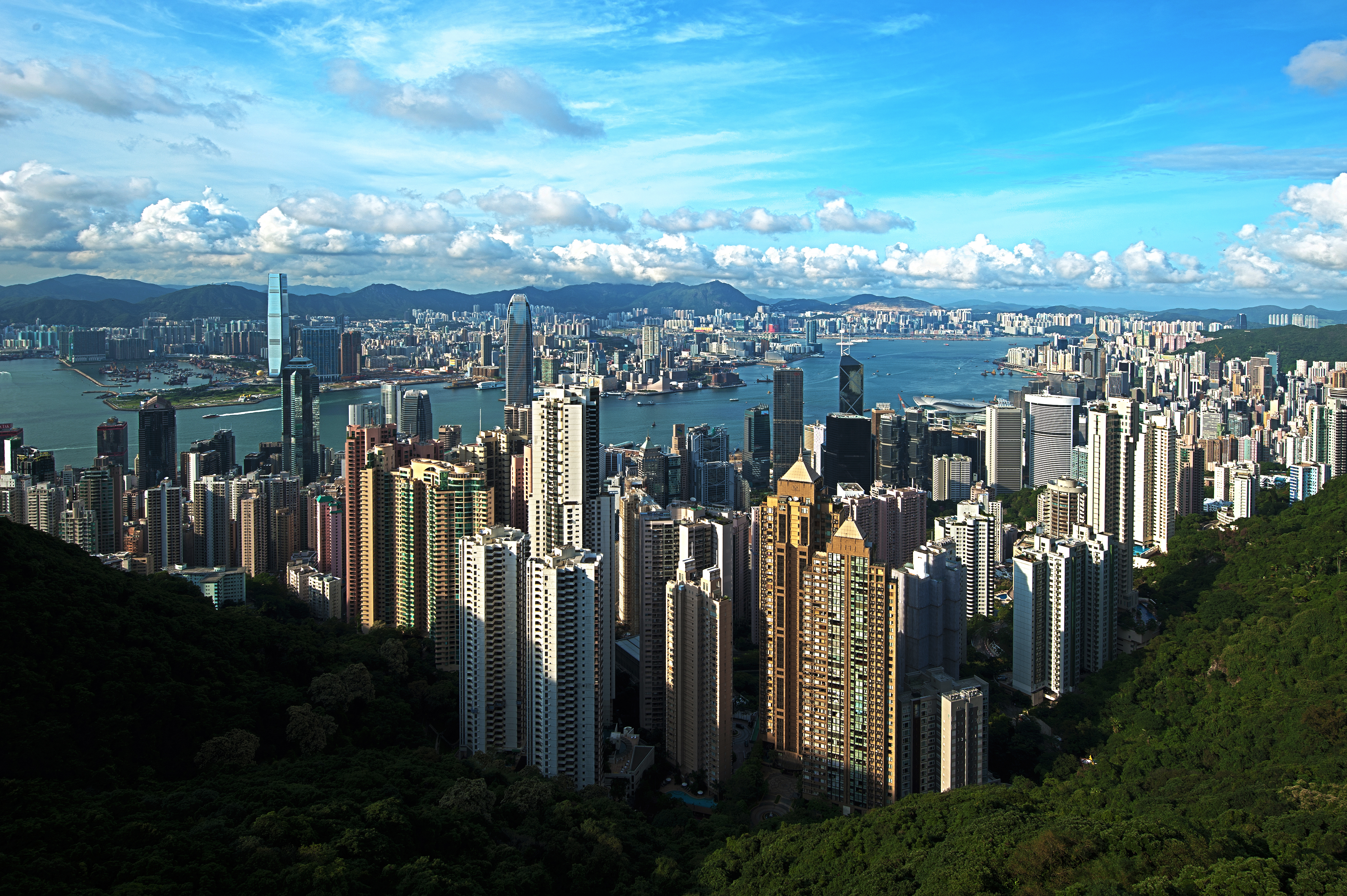
The design crew scouted areas of Hong Kong to faithfully depict the region on the show.

Some of the settings in G Gundam were planned using location scouting, a technique Imagawa learned while working on his directorial debut, Mister Ajikko. He stated that this type of research can "upgrade" animation production quality when supplemented by indirect experience from watching films. For the prison in Neo Russia, Imagawa drew from the architecture of the Alcatraz Federal Penitentiary, which he coincidentally toured one year before G Gundam's development. When his superiors requested he restrict the show's setting to one location, Imagawa used the city Shinjuku (beginning in the 12th episode) as an opportunity for his staff to learn and practice location scouting within Japan. Changing countries every week in the show's early run was overwhelming for the set designers and background artists, yet the crew felt Imagawa "over-elaborate" on Shinjuku. The story transitioned to Guyana so that the artists could apply a simpler, dense forest environment. Once this portion of the anime's plot concluded, staff members flew to Hong Kong to research and record for the Neo Hong Kong story arc. Imagawa mentioned that Neo Hong Kong does not possess its own space colony in G Gundam, so he wanted to accurately depict the country as one that continues to thrive on Earth. The director speculated that it would be difficult to illustrate Hong Kong due to its amount of detail, but he was very satisfied with the background artist's work.

Imagawa credits himself for conceiving a majority of the various Gundams participating in the finals of the Neo Hong Kong arc. The director worked closely with mecha artists to create these "one-shot" opponents and found many of the comical and eccentric designs very charming, especially the windmill-shaped Hurricane Gundam of Neo Holland. The designs for Neo Singapore's Ashura Gundam and Neo Malaysia's Skull Gundam were included in the show as winners of contests held by the Kodansha publications Comic BonBon and TV Magazine; Imagawa expressed regret that these Gundams were used as enemy characters since they were designed by young fans of the anime.

Around the 40th episode, Imagawa focused on adding a romantic theme into G Gundam's narrative. He explained that he was "not good at depicting female characters" when directing and he had not previously "written a 'normal' relationship of man and woman". G Gundam was Imagawa's first attempt at a "love story", though he admitted it took him the entire length of the series demonstrates this point. The show's final scene shows Domon and Rain riding off together on the horse Fuun Saiki; Imagawa sensed that the cliché of the hero with his damsel on a white horse was "the safe road" given the director's lack of experience with love stories. Imagawa polarized the production studio staff when he decided to insert the English phrase "Love-Love" into Domon and Rain's final attack against the Devil Gundam. Sunrise producer Masahiko Minami protested that it sounded so "unseemly" that he even confronted Imagawa about it at the director's home. However, Imagawa not only thought the phrase had a nice ring to it but wanted to include it because he had already found success in defying convention with G Gundam. Imagawa was prepared to take the risk of any harsh criticism for its use in the finale. "I didn't even care if I wouldn't be able to work in the industry because of that 'Love-Love'," he said. "I truly believe that one cannot work as a director without enthusiasm and a love of challenges."

== Media ==
=== Anime ===
The Mobile Fighter G Gundam television series originally aired in Japan on the terrestrial channel TV Asahi from April 22, 1994, to March 31, 1995, for a total of 49 episodes. The show would not reach North American audiences until 2002. Mobile Suit Gundam Wing, a series that succeeded G Gundam on Japanese television in 1995, was first localized in North America by Bandai Entertainment in early 2000. Gundam Wing was a huge success in the United States while being broadcast on the popular afternoon Toonami block of Cartoon Network often beating block stalwarts Dragon Ball Z and Sailor Moon and was the highest-rated program on all of Cartoon Network for a time. In late 2001, Bandai acquired the rights to distribute an English-dubbed version of G Gundam with voice casting recorded by Ocean Productions in their Blue Water studio in Calgary, Alberta. The English-language version of G Gundam premiered as a free screening at the Sony Metreon Action Theatre in San Francisco on March 30, 2002, and subsequently premiered on Toonami on August 5, 2002. Due to the channel's censorship policies, some edits were made for the broadcast. This mainly involved altering the names of several mobile fighters, such as changing God Gundam and Devil Gundam to Burning Gundam and Dark Gundam respectively. The show was also aired on the channel's "Midnight Run" and as part of its Saturday programming in November 2002. Cartoon Network officially dropped G Gundam from its afternoon schedule the following June. The series has since been re-broadcast on the Japanese cable network Family Gekijo and the satellite channel Animax.

Bandai Entertainment released G Gundam on DVD in North America in four box sets and in twelve separate volumes (each disc containing four to five episodes). The DVDs contain both the English-dubbed and Japanese-subtitled versions, as well as extras such as production notes from the director. The first three volumes and first box set were released on November 5, 2002. The second box set and next three volumes were released on February 4, 2003. The third box set and next three volumes were released on April 22, 2003. The final box set and last three volumes were released on June 17, 2003. Bandai re-released the series as part of its "Anime Legends" label in two larger collections on May 9 and June 27, 2006. G Gundam has had similar DVD releases in Japan; a collection containing the entire series was placed on sale October 27, 2010. G Gundam has further been made available on various video on demand services including Amazon Instant Video, the broadband access site Bandai Channel, and Bandai's official GundamInfo YouTube channel. Due to the closure of Bandai Entertainment, the series has been out-of-print. On October 11, 2014, at their 2014 New York Comic Con panel, Sunrise announced they will be releasing all of the Gundam franchise, including G Gundam in North America though distribution from Right Stuf Inc., beginning in Spring 2015. On March 29, 2017, Crunchyroll began streaming the series on their website. Right Stuf will release the series on Blu-ray and DVD in 2018.

G Gundam was also the second Gundam series to air on Philippine television and dubbed in Filipino on GMA Network in 1999, replacing Gundam Wing.

=== Gundams ===
- GF13-017NJ, also known as Neo Japan's Shining Gundam, appeared in episode #1, "Gundam Fight Begins! The Gundam that Fell to Earth." Shining Gundam is piloted by Domo Kasshu.
- GF13-055NI, also known as Neo Italy's Neros Gundam, appeared in episode #1, "Gundam Fight Begins! The Gundam that Fell to Earth." Neros Gundam is piloted by Michelo Chariot.
- GF13-006NA, also known as Neo America's Gundam Maxter, appeared in episode #2, "Roar of the winning Punch." Gundam Maxter is piloted by Chibodee Crocket.
- GF13-011NC, also known as Neo China's Dragon Gundam, appeared in episode #3, "Beat the Dragon Gundam." Dragon Gundam is piloted by Sai Saici.
- GF13-009NFII, also known as Neo France's Rose Gundam, appeared in episode #4, "Challenge! The Red Rose Knight!" Rose Gundam is piloted by George De Sand.
- GF13-013NR, also known as Neo Russia'a Bolt Gundam, appeared in episode #5, "Great Escape! A Captive Gundam Fighter." Bolt Gundam is piloted by Argo Gulskii
- Ultimate Gundam, also known as Devil Gundam and Dark Gundam, appeared in episode #6, "Fight, Domon! Earth Is the Ring." Ultimate Gundam is piloted by Kyoji Kasshu.
- GF13-049NM, also known as Neo Mexico's Tequila Gundam and Spike Gundam, appeared in episode #7, "Prepare to Fight! Desperate Fugitive." Tequila Gundam is piloted by Chico Rodriguez.
- GF13-037NCA, also known as Neo Canada's Lumber Gundam, appeared in episode #8, "Old Grudge: Revenge of the Space Police." Lumber Gundam is piloted by Andrew Graham.
- GF12-001NEL, also known as Neo England's John Bull Gundam and Royal Gundam, appeared in episode #9, "Powerful Enemy! Chapman's Heroic Challenge." Royal Gundam is piloted by Gentle Chapman.
- GF13-051NE, also known as Neo Egypt's Pharaoh Gundam XIII, appeared in episode #10, "Terror! The Phantom Fighter Appears." Pharaoh Gundam XIII is piloted by Kaure Ramses.
- GF4-001NE, also known as Neo Egypt's Pharaoh Gundam IV, appeared in episode #10, "Terror! The Phantom Fighter Appears." Pharaoh Gundam IV is piloted by Dahal Muhammad.
- GF13-052NT, also known as Neo Turkey's Minaret Gundam, appeared in episode #11, "Reunion in the Falling Rain." Minaret Gundam is piloted by Saette Gyuzelle.
- JDG-009X, also known as Death Army, appeared in episode #12, "He's The Undefeated of the East! Master Asia Appears." Death Army is piloted by Devil Gundam contaminated Zombie soldiers.
- GF13-001NH, also known as Neo Hong Kong's Kowloon, appeared in episode #14, "Shocking! Shining Finger Defeated!" Kowloon Gundam is piloted by Master Asia
- GF13-001NHII, also known as Master Gundam, appeared in episode #14, "Shocking! Shining Finger Defeated!" Master Gundam is piloted by Master Asia.
- Shuffle Joker appeared in episode #15, "Warrior's Crest! Goodbye, Shuffle Alliance." Shuffle Joker is piloted by Tris Sergeyrev.
- Shuffle Club appeared in episode #15, "Warrior's Crest! Goodbye, Shuffle Alliance." Shuffle Club is piloted by Alan Lee
- Shuffle Spade appeared in episode #15, "Warrior's Crest! Goodbye, Shuffle Alliance." Shuffle Spade is piloted by Max Burns.
- Shuffle Diamond appeared in episode #15, "Warrior's Crest! Goodbye, Shuffle Alliance." Shuffle Diamond is piloted by Nassius Kircher.
- GF13-021NG, also known as Neo Germany's Gundam Spiegel, appeared in episode #16, "Ultimate Power and Evil! Rise of the Devil Gundam." Gundam Spiegel is piloted by Schwarz Bruder.
- GF13-044NNP, also known as Neo Nepal Mandala Gundam, appeared in episode #25, "All Fighters Gathered! The Final Battles Begin." Mandala Gundam is piloted by Kyral Mekirel.
- GF13-026ND, also known as Neo Denmark Mermaid Gundam, appeared in episode #25, "All Fighters Gathered! The Final Battles Begin." Mermaid Gundam is piloted by Hans Holger.
- GF13-002NGR, also known as Neo Greece Zeus Gundam, appeared in episode #25, "All Fighters Gathered! The Final Battles Begin." Zeus Gundam is piloted by Marcelot Cronos.
- GF13-012NN, also known as Neo Norway Viking Gundam, appeared in episode #25, "All Fighters Gathered! The Final Battles Begin." Viking Gundam is piloted by Eric the Viking
- GF13-020NK, also known as Neo Kenya Zebra Gundam, appeared in episode #25, "All Fighters Gathered! The Final Battles Begin." Zebra Gundam is piloted by Conta N'Doul.
- GF13-045NSP, also known as Neo Spain Matador Gundam, appeared in episode #25, "All Fighters Gathered! The Final Battles Begin." Matador Gundam is piloted by Carlos Andalusia.
- GF13-066ND, also known as Neo Holland Nether Gundam, appeared in episode #25, "All Fighters Gathered! The Final Battles Begin." Nether Gundam is piloted by Rutger Verhoeven.
- GF13-017NJII, also known as Neo Japan's God Gundam, Burning Gundam, appeared in episode #23, "Destined Battle! Domon vs. Devil Gundam." Burning Gundam is piloted by Domon Kasshu.
- GF13-050NSW, also known as Neo Sweden's Nobel Gundam or Noble Gundam, appeared in episode #30, "Beautiful Fighter! Dangerous Allenby." Nobel Gundam is piloted by Allenby Beardsley.

=== Manga and light novels ===
The manga adaptation, written by Yasuhiro Imagawa and illustrated by Kazuhiko Shimamoto, was serialized from 2010 to 2016.

A large amount of printed fiction related to Mobile Fighter G Gundam has been published since the original Japanese airing of the series. The first was a manga adaptation of the show, illustrated by Kōichi Tokita and serialized in Kodansha's Comic BonBon from April 1994 to April 1995. Three bound volumes (tankōbon) collecting the individual chapters were released by Kodansha between October 6, 1994, and May 6, 1995. During the airing of the TV series in North America, Tokyopop acquired the rights to publish an English-translated version of the manga. All three volumes were released between June 17 and October 7, 2003. A light novel adaptation of the TV series by Yoshitake Suzuki was published in three books by Kadokawa Shoten under its Sneaker Bunko label between August 29, 1995, and March 1, 1997. In addition to the adaptations, a plethora of one-shot side stories and spin-offs to the main plot that have been published in various Japanese magazines. Two manga were serialized in certain editions of Kodansha's Comic BonBon. The first was a side story titled Kidō Butōden G Gundam Gaiden Shōryū Densetsu (機動武闘伝Gガンダム外伝翔龍伝説; "Mobile Fighter G Gundam Side Story: Flying Dragon Legend"), detailing Sai Sai Ci's journey to improve his fighting skills after losing to Domon in the 13th Gundam Fight finals. The manga was written and illustrated by Toshiya Murakami, serialized from December 1994 to April 1995 and released as a tankōbon on June 6, 1995. The second was a prequel story titled Kidō Butōden Gaiden Gundam Fight 7th (機動武闘外伝ガンダムファイト7th; "Mobile Fighter Side Story: 7th Gundam Fight"), telling of a young Master Asia's participation in the 7th Gundam Fight. Authored by Kitarou Ototoi, this manga was serialized from March to December 1996 and released in tankōbon form on January 8, 1997.

From 2010 to 2016, Kadokawa Shoten's Gundam Ace magazine serialized a 26-volume G Gundam manga retelling written by series director Yasuhiro Imagawa and illustrated by the show's character collaborator Kazuhiko Shimamoto with his associated Honō Production studio. Imagawa described this manga as "the complete version of the story, the master work version". The first part, titled Chōkyū! Kidō Butōden G Gundam (超級! 機動武闘伝Gガンダム; "Super Class! Mobile Fighter G Gundam"), was serialized from July 26, 2010, to August 26, 2011; seven tankōbon were released from December 25, 2010, to December 26, 2011. The second part, subtitled Shinjuku Tōhō Fuhai! (新宿・東方不敗！; "Shinjuku / Undefeated of the East!"), was serialized from September 26, 2011, to January 26, 2013; eight tankōbon were released from December 26, 2011, to July 26, 2013. A third part, subtitled Bakunetsu Neo Hong Kong! (爆熱・ネオホンコン！; "Erupting / Neo Hong Kong!"), was serialized from February 26, 2013, to 2015; seven tankōbon volumes were released from July 26, 2013, to August 26, 2015. A fourth and final part, subtitled Saishū Kessen-hen (最終決戦編; "The Final Battle"), was serialized from 2015 to August 26, 2016; four tankōbon volumes were released from August 26, 2015, to September 26, 2016.

=== CDs ===
A total of four soundtrack albums containing the background and vocal music of Mobile Fighter G Gundam were released during the show's original television run in Japan. All of them were republished by Starchild on March 5, 1999. The first album, Round 1 & 2, is two discs of music. The second album, Round 3, contains music and a special audio drama featuring the show's Japanese voice actors. The third album, Round 4, contains the rest of the background music. The final album, Round 5, features vocal image songs performed by the voice cast as well as instrumental versions of the show's two opening themes. Vocal songs from the show have also been included on various Gundam music compilations.

=== Video games ===
Bandai has published three Japan-exclusive fighting video games based solely on Mobile Fighter G Gundam. The first game, developed by Pandora Box for the Super Famicom, was released on December 27, 1994. The second game, also developed by Natsume, was released for the PlayStation on October 10, 2002, as the 12th volume of the Simple Characters 2000 series. The third game was released for mobile phones supported by Japan's i-mode and FOMA services on November 6, 2006. In addition, characters and mecha from G Gundam have appeared in various Gundam crossover games such as Mobile Suit Gundam: Encounters in Space, the SD Gundam G Generation series, the Dynasty Warriors: Gundam series, and Banpresto's Super Robot Wars franchise, among others.

=== Other merchandise ===
Bandai has marketed a large amount of collectible merchandise based on G Gundam in both Japanese and North American territories. This includes plastic model kits ranging from 1:144 to 1:60 scales; expensive garage kits made from resin; and action figures, some of which are exclusive to North America. Sunrise produced a promotional short film centered on G Gundam as the third entry of an OVA series known as Gundam Evolve, packaged as a limited edition bonus with the Master Grade GF13-017NJ Shining Gundam model kit. Numerous guide/art books relating to G Gundam have been published. There are two Japanese books published by MediaWorks: Mobile Fighter G Gundam: Gundam Fight Handbook (機動武闘伝Gガンダム ガンダムファイトハンドブック) released in August 1994 and Mobile Fighter G Gundam Complete Record (機動武闘伝Gガンダム 完全収録ガンダムファイト) released in June 1995. Another book, Gundam Wars 4 Fighting G: Model Graphix Special Edition (ガンダムウォーズ4 ファイティングG―モデルグラフィックス スペシャル・エディション), was published by Dai Nippon Kaiga Co. in September 1995. Rapport released an art book titled Mobile Fighter G Gundam: Battle Memory (機動武闘伝Gガンダム バトルメモリー) in 1994. Hobby Japan published a book in its Gundam Weapons series in July 2002, dedicated to collecting and building scale models based on the show. An English-language guide book, Mobile Fighter G Gundam Technical Manual, was released by Tokyopop in North America on November 12, 2002. The Japanese clothing company Cospa sells officially licensed apparel featuring G Gundam.

== Reception ==
Mobile Fighter G Gundam received mediocre television ratings during its run on Japanese television in 1994 and 1995. According to Nikkei Business Publications, the series saw an average of just 4.02% viewership for the Kantō region and Greater Tokyo Area throughout its 49-episode run. The overall ratings for G Gundam were higher than that of the previous series Mobile Suit Victory Gundam and slightly lower than the following series Mobile Suit Gundam Wing. Critically, G Gundam was met with some controversy upon its Japanese debut. G Gundam replicates very little of the dramatic, militaristic conventions of prior Gundam series, setting itself apart with a different tone; taking place outside the franchise's main timeline; and foregoing large-scale, armed conflicts in favor of tournament-style, martial arts matches. Director Yasuhiro Imagawa claimed to have taken a large amount of criticism for these changes from both fans and design staff members. G Gundam ultimately proved very popular in Japan, however, after the debut of characters such as Master Asia, whose Master Gundam bolstered merchandise sales after its appearance.

Both Kunio Okawara and Yoshikazu Yasuhiko, animation director and character designer for the original Mobile Suit Gundam, praised G Gundam, crediting Imagawa's work to allowing individuals other than Yoshiyuki Tomino to create an original Gundam concept.

Early in the show's North American run, Bandai reported that G Gundam had the top ratings of any anime show for the period. The company considered the show to be a "hit" at the time. However, officials for Toonami recounted in 2006 that no Gundam series earned significant viewer ratings after the first North American airing of Gundam Wing in 2000. G Gundam received an overall positive critical reception amid its mainstream exposure in the United States. Nonetheless, views on G Gundam's plot remain largely mixed. Negative reactions to the plot mostly stem from its stark contrast to preceding Gundam entries that have traditionally focused on deep political and social issues in the midst of war. AnimeNation writer John Oppliger considered G Gundam to be "the plague of the Gundam franchise" and "one of the biggest mis-steps in anime history" due to its elimination of such serious subtext. Both Bamboo Dong of the Anime News Network and Duncan Scott of Protoculture Addicts were also initially disappointed for the same reason, with the latter writer feeling that the series features "Gundam" in its title purely for marketing reasons. Derrick L. Tucker of T.H.E.M. Anime Reviews called the series' episodic storyline its "most profound weakness", whereby "the narrative exists predominately [sic] to move the viewer from fight to fight". Tucker also found that the potential for its more dramatic themes, such as tension between Domon and Master Asia or Domon's romantic relationship with Rain, is "overshadowed from start to finale by the show's domineering, if repetitive action sets".

Other critics were more accepting of the plot as it progressed, overlooking comparisons to past Gundam series. Animerica editor Mark Simmons, Martin Ouellette of Protoculture Addicts, and anime journalist Mike Toole have all shared opinions that the show can be immensely enjoyed by not taking it too seriously. David Smith of IGN denoted G Gundam "the greatest giant robot series that has ever been" because of the seemingly "over-the-top" nature that drives the premise. Smith asserted, "G Gundam maintains a completely straight face through every second. That's the trick, because to let the audience laugh for one moment would break the effect. You don't laugh at G Gundam – you become completely absorbed in the wondrous violence of it all." Simmons concluded that the addition of components like "nanotechnological plagues, evil armies, zombie legions, betrayal, and heartbreak [...] make the end result entertaining for more sophisticated viewers as well as for youngsters enticed by the colorful shiny robots". Toole stated that despite valid criticism that the plot is "silly and exaggerated" and its introductory episodes suffering from "battle of the week fare", the debut of Master Asia triggers "some great character development". Dong similarly appreciated the show more in its Neo Hong Kong story arc and perceived it much easier for a new viewer to begin watching at any point in the series than with other Gundam installments.

The large cast of characters and mecha in G Gundam has received mostly praise from critics. Toole, Tucker, Ouellette, and Smith made positive mention of the primary characters for their unique designs and attributes; all four reviewers have noted many of the supporting characters to be overly stereotypical with regard to their nationality. Toole particularly enjoyed the protagonist Domon, whom he described as very well-rounded, and regarded Master Asia as "both a great hero and a great villain". Tucker interpreted the main characters "stylized and distinctive" which possess individual motivations that give them "dynamic appeal". Tucker was also impressed with the design variety and color format of the mobile fighters, which break the mold set by the conventional Gundam template. Toole and Smith together felt that the more campy Gundam stereotypes added to the show's endearment. While referring to Neo America's mobile fighter, Smith exclaimed, "This show has a cowboy/boxer/quarterback/surfer Gundam, for God's sake." Simmons equivalently and sarcastically summarized, "This is a world where the space colony of Neo Holland is represented by a Gundam that transforms into a giant windmill."

== Legacy ==
During the North American DVD production interviews for Mobile Fighter G Gundam, Imagawa was asked to address the message "See you again Gundam Fight 14" shown at the last cut of the final episode. He answered that it was simply word play and had no intention of affirming a sequel to the anime. Granted its large number of manga side-stories, Imagawa surmised that it would be "impossible" to create an animated sequel or OVA series to G Gundam and disclosed he would not direct it if there were. He said, "I believe G Gundam is a series that started as a program for kids and eventually worked out because I stayed vividly aware of that until the very last moment, overcoming a lot of obstacles and bad situations (in terms of directing)."

Oppliger found that G Gundam had established a legacy within the anime industry, albeit a different one from its 1979 namesake. He elaborated that G Gundam represents a "catalyst for development within Japan's anime industry" for being the first complete reboot of the Gundam franchise and the first of many Gundam TV series to feature a self-contained storyline separate from the traditional franchise continuity. In 2001, G Gundam was listed by the Japanese magazine Animage among the top 100 most important anime in history in terms of historical significance, influence and impact on the anime industry.

Preceded by Mobile Suit Victory Gundam	Gundam metaseries (production order); 1994–1995	Succeeded by Mobile Suit Gundam Wing
