= List of Ashita no Joe manga volumes =

Ashita no Joe (あしたのジョー; Tomorrow's Joe) is a Japanese boxing manga series written by Asao Takamori and illustrated by Tetsuya Chiba. The story follows a young boxer named Joe Yabuki, who lives in the Tokyo slums.

Ashita no Joe was first serialized by Kodansha in Weekly Shonen Magazine from January 1, 1968, to May 13, 1973, and was later collected into 20 tankōbon volumes. During its serialization, it was popular with working-class people and college students in Japan. It has been adapted into various media, including Megalo Box, an anime that was made as a part of the 50th anniversary of Ashita no Joe.

== Volume list ==
No.	Japanese release date	Japanese ISBN
1	March 7, 1970	978-4-06-109080-4
2	March 7, 1970	978-4-06-109081-1
3	May 4, 1970	978-4-06-109086-6
4	May 6, 1970	978-4-06-109087-3
5	July 6, 1970	978-4-06-109091-0
6	October 7, 1970	978-4-06-109099-6
7	January 18, 1971	978-4-06-109110-8
8	March 8, 1971	978-4-06-109116-0
9	May 6, 1971	978-4-06-109122-1
10	July 6, 1971	978-4-06-109125-2
11	October 7, 1971	978-4-06-109130-6
12	December 8, 1971	978-4-06-109135-1
13	February 4, 1972	978-4-06-109142-9
14	June 6, 1972	978-4-06-109150-4
15	August 8, 1972	978-4-06-109154-2
16	October 9, 1972	978-4-06-109164-1
17	December 8, 1972	978-4-06-109172-6
18	February 8, 1973	978-4-06-109184-9
19	May 7, 1973	978-4-06-109191-7
20	June 15, 1973	978-4-06-109196-2

== English release ==
Kodansha USA is releasing the series in English under the title Ashita no Joe: Fighting for Tomorrow. This release is based on the 8-volume Japanese High Grade Edition (HGT) format.

Volume	Release date	ISBN	Chapters covered
1	December 24, 2024	978-1-64729-387-1	1–29
2	April 29, 2025	978-1-64729-388-8	30–58
3	August 26, 2025	978-1-64729-389-5	58–82
4	December 23, 2025	978-1-64729-490-8	82–104
5	April 28, 2026	978-1-64729-516-5	105–127
6	August 25, 2026	978-1-64729-517-2	TBA
7	December 15, 2026	978-1-64729-518-9	TBA
8	April 20, 2027	978-1-64729-519-6	TBA
