= Joe Yabuki =

Fictional character in Ashita no Joe

- Ashita no Joe character
- Joe Yabuki by Tetsuya Chiba
- First appearance: Ashita no Joe chapter 1 (1968)
- Created by: Asao Takamori, Tetsuya Chiba
- Portrayed by: Shōji Ishibashi (1970), Tomohisa Yamashita (2011)
- Voiced by: Teruhiko Aoi, Kei Tomiyama (Pilot Film), Yoshito Yasuhara (Radio Drama)

In-universe information
- Alias: Joe

Joe Yabuki (Japanese: 矢吹 丈, Hepburn: Yabuki Jō) nicknamed just Joe (ジョー, Jō) is the protagonist of the manga series Ashita no Joe by Asao Takamori and Tetsuya Chiba. Joe Yabuki, is a wandering orphan who discovers a passion for boxing in a juvenile prison, and his rise through Japan's and the global boxing scene. He is coached by Danpei Tange to become skilled and face his prison cell partner Tōru Rikiishi. The character has also appeared in video games based on Ashita no Joe and has been portrayed in two live-action works by and Shōji Ishibashi and Tomohisa Yamashita.

The character was based on multiple boxers Asao Takamori researched. The main idea behind Joe's characterization was that he was passionate about his love of boxing and thus would live to his full extent until his death. Critical response to the character was positive due to his characterization and rivalry with Tōru Rikiishi. Joe went on to become iconic in manga history, influencing real boxers and other fictional characters, most notably Kyo Kusanagi and Gearless Joe. The character's final fate has been ambiguous which was a major hit in manga history but Chiba often saying he did not give him a particular fate as he had no idea how to close the manga.

== Creation ==
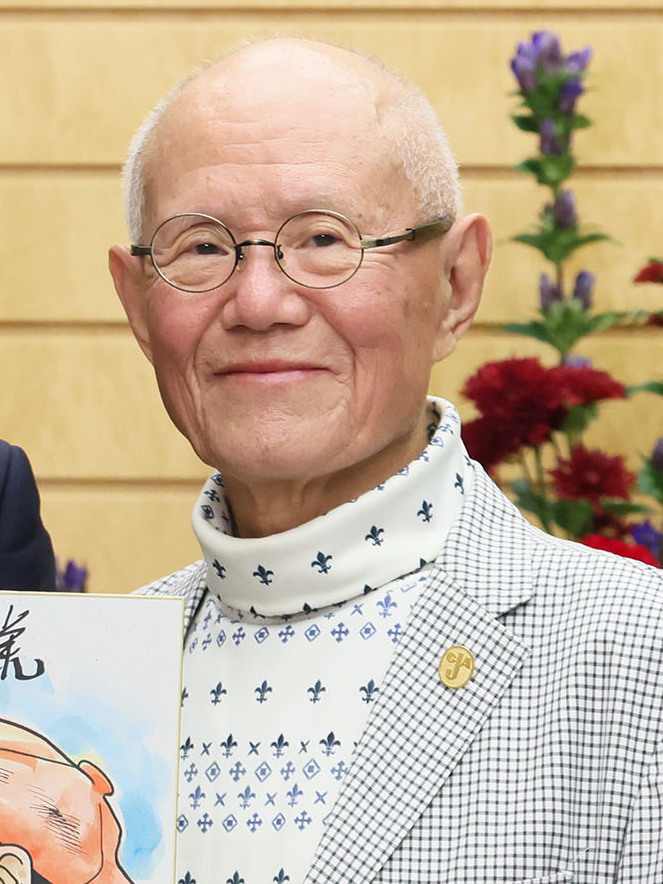
Artist Tetsuya Chiba in 2023.

Joe Yabuki was initially based on Sawada Jiro, who was the Oriental Lightweight Champion in his youth. Two other notable influences include Aoki Shori and Ebiwara Hiroyuki. There were several scrapped ideas for Joe's character as the mangaka was influenced by other fighters during the series' production. Joe's desire to fight was based on the author's own desires of living to the fullest until his death. Joe and Rikiishi's rivalry was something that the author found painful to write due to the latter's death. The manga influenced several fans who began boxing. The mangaka also wanted to portray those who did not succeed, as there are many characters in Ashita no Joe who have given up on their dreams. Chiba was more optimistic about how he handled Joe and Noriko's relationship when writing a chapter about the two going on a date.

Ikki Kajiwara is knowledgeable about martial arts, and his manuscripts are very "masculine". Initially, the author did not understand how Joe and Rikiishi's friendship was cultivated through their battles. But as he drew, Chiba came to understand that "fighting to the point of depleting your life means that you both respect each other." It was also difficult for him to draw the scene where Joe vomits in the ring after Rikiishi's death due to the shock. One of the final scenes, in which Joe says, "I want to burn out... to pure white ash," sparked a debate over whether Joe should live or die. At the time the ending was written, Chiba was not thinking about Joe's fate and only wanted to draw a picture that would convey someone who has given all of their effort and burned out.

Nonetheless, Chiba implied in 1973 that Joe died in the ending, and Takamori explicitly said so in 1979. In a 2001 interview, forensic pathologist Masahiko Ueno concluded that Joe had to be alive in the final panel to remain upright.

== Role in Ashita no Joe ==
The series' final scene has been left ambiguous to readers about whether or not Joe Yabuki was written to live or die.

Joe Yabuki, a young drifter, has a chance encounter with alcoholic former boxing trainer Danpei Tange while wandering through the San'ya slums. Recognizing his talent, Danpei trains Joe as a boxer, but Joe is arrested for fraud. He is transferred to a juvenile detention center where meets Tōru Rikiishi, a former boxing prodigy, and they develop a rivalry after Rikiishi prevents him from escaping. The prison sets up a boxing tournament led by Danpei and funded by millionaire Mikinosuke Shiraki and his daughter Yoko. Rikiishi dominates Joe in the final until the latter hits a cross-counter, resulting in a double knockout. Feeling that the match did not resolve anything, Joe and Rikiishi vow to fight again as professional boxers.

Upon his release from prison, Joe joins Danpei's new tiny boxing gym together. Joe gains popularity as an amateur boxer for his brawling style and trademark cross-counter KO wins, but he is denied a professional license until provoking champion boxer Wolf Kanagushi. Joe earns the right to fight Rikiishi in the professional ring. Rikiishi knocks Joe out in the 8th round to win, but later dies from the combined effects of weight loss and a brain hemorrhage sustained during the fight.

Joe is traumatized by Rikiishi's death, making a downfall in his career. He returns to fight global sixth ranked fighter Carlos Rivera. The fight devolves into a brawl, but Joe earns tremendous fame and respect, and he and Carlos become friends. After his fight with Carlos, Joe becomes recognized as a world ranked boxer. He struggles with maintaining bantam weight due to a late growth spurt, forcing him to undergo strenuous weight loss. He defeats OPBF Champion Kim Yong-bi, and proceeds to win several title defenses. Fearing that Joe has lost his fighting instincts, she forces him to face Malaysian fighter Harimau before he can challenge Mendoza. Joe narrowly wins the fight. The fight against Mendoza is to be held in a packed Tokyo stadium. Before the fight, Yoko discovers that Joe is suffering from punch-drunk syndrome. She attempts to cancel the match, confessing her love for him, but he refuses. Mendoza dominates the early rounds. Initially composed, Mendoza begins losing his mind as Joe continues to hold on no matter how much damage he takes. Joe manages to knock down Mendoza several times. The match eventually goes all fifteen rounds. Mendoza is declared the winner by points. Danpei turns to console Joe only to find him sitting unresponsive in his chair, with a smile on his face.

== Reception ==
During the manga's serialization, it was particularly popular with working-class people and college students who were involved in the New Left, who saw themselves likewise struggling against the system like Joe Yabuki did and revered him as an icon. An example of this New Left influence were the members of the Japanese Red Army who took part in the Yodogo hijacking in 1970 and compared themselves to Joe as they saw a revolutionary message in the manga. During the hijack, they shouted "We are tomorrow's Joe!". Joe Yabuki was ranked seventh in Mania Entertainment's "10 Most Iconic Anime Heroes", written by Thomas Zoth, who commented that, "Tomorrow's Joe captured the zeitgeist of 1960s Japan. The story of Joe's rise from nothing touched a chord with Japanese audiences, who were seeing their country prosper after a long period of postwar devastation." There is a pro boxer named Joichiro Tatsuyoshi, who became a superstar in Japan. His father took the name "Joichiro" from Joe Yabuki. In Kebukuro's Oizumi Anime Gate a bronze statue of Joe was made alongside other anime icons. The character is considered a symbol of Japanese popular culture, becoming, especially in the seventies, an influential icon on a myriad of Japanese people of all ages and one of the major icons of the manga world. Even today it is such a success that on October 13, 2006, Joe placed fourth in the ranking of the "best Japanese TV anime".

Joe was also a major influence in Kyo Kusanagi, the main character of SNK's fighting game series, The King of Fighters. Megalobox director Yo Moriyama stated Gearless Joe and Yuri were loosely based Jo Yabuki and Rikiishi as a tribute to such manga, respectively, as he views that the rivalry of two boxers was the main event of Ashita no Joe which Megalobox adadpted. Manga.Tokyo positively compared Gearless Joe with Jo Yabuki as, despite the series being a tribute to Ashita no Joe with multiple similarities, he comes across as more likable character than the arrogant Jo describing him as a "much more down to earth, easy-going loveable rogue, kind of like Spike Spiegel from Cowboy Bebop". As a result, he views Gearless Joe as an improvement over the original Joe but felt his rivalry with Yuri lacked depth despite him being his final rival in the first season. Anime News Network praised Joe's character arc in the series as well as his rivalry with Rikiishi, with the latter coming across as homoerotic tension. Joe's trauma over Rikiishi's death was especially notable because of the way he is illustrated from this point he often came across as a dead person. Joe's fate caused a major impact in Japanese culture when the anime ended there was a 700-person funeral procession for him by Shūji Terayama. Joe's final scene has also been referenced in several series like Gurren Lagann and Gin Tama, while his crosscounter with Rikiishi was also referenced in the former as well as Dragon Ball Z and the Dragon Ball Super anime. Street Fighter character Dudley's Cross Counter is a homage to Joe.
