= List of Megalobox episodes =

Megalobox is a 2018 Japanese anime series created in commemoration of the 50th anniversary of the manga Ashita no Joe. The series was announced on October 12, 2017, through a video uploaded to TMS Entertainment's official YouTube channel. It was produced by TMS Entertainment and 3xCube with Yō Moriyama as series director and concept designer. Katsuhiko Manabe and Kensaku Kojima were in charge of the scripts, with music composed by hip hop artist Mabanua. The series premiered on JNN, TBS, and BS-TBS from April 6 to June 29, 2018.

The opening theme is "Bite" by LEO Imai while the ending theme is "Kakatte Koi yo" (かかってこいよ, lit. 'Come at Me') by NakamuraEmi with insert songs performed by rap artist COMA-CHI.

The series was simulcasted on Crunchyroll. During their Anime Expo 2018 panel, Viz Media announced that they licensed the anime. Anime Limited announced that they had acquired the series for home video release in the United Kingdom and Ireland. Madman Entertainment acquired the series for distribution in Australia and New Zealand, and streamed the series on AnimeLab.

The series premiered on Adult Swim's Toonami programming block on December 9, 2018. (Note: Adult Swim lists the series as premiering on December 8, 2018 at 12:00 a.m. (24:00) EST/PST, which is effectively December 9.)

During Anime NYC on November 16, 2019, the staff announced that the series would receive a second season. The second season, titled Megalobox 2: Nomad, aired from April 4 to June 27, 2021, on Tokyo MX and BS11. The main staff and cast members reprised their roles. Funimation licensed the second season.

== Series overview ==
Season	Episodes	Originally released	
Season	Episodes	First released	Last released
1	13	April 6, 2018	June 29, 2018
2	13	April 4, 2021	June 27, 2021

== Episode list ==
=== Megalobox (2018) ===
No.	Title	Directed by	Written by	Original release date	English air date
1	"Buy or Die?" / "Don't Let the Simmering Fire Die. It'll Light the Way in the Dark."; Transliteration: "Kusuburu Hi o Tayasu na. Sore ga Kurai Michi o Terasu Akari to Naru" (Japanese: くすぶる火をたやすな。それが暗い道を照らす灯となる)	Yō Moriyama	Katsuhiko Manabe	April 6, 2018	December 9, 2018
Junk Dog is a Megalo Boxer who fights in an illegal underground ring in fixed matches under the guidance of Gansaku Nanbu. He longs to have a real fight that does not have a decided result. One evening he almost hits Yukiko Shirato, the head of the Shirato Group which oversees the Megalonia tournament, with his motorcycle. Yukiko offers to reimburse Junk Dog but he refuses, instead angrily telling her that the Megalonia tournament is not true Megalo Boxing. Yūri, Yukiko's bodyguard, is offended by Junk Dog's lack of respect towards his employer. Junk Dog picks a fight with him in the hopes of experiencing true Megalo Boxing. Yūri gives off a powerful aura which gets Junk Dog pumped up, but Yukiko stops the fight from happening. Later on, Junk Dog is getting ready to fight his latest opponent, but Yūri steps into the ring instead. The crowd is shocked since Yūri is actually the Megalo Box champion, and is there without Yukiko knowing. Nanbu tries to stop the fight but is punched out of the ring by Junk Dog, who insists on fighting Yūri with his own skill.
2	"The Man Only Dies Once" / ""No Man Has Ever Died Twice," Mumbled the Gambler."; Transliteration: "Nido Shinda Yatsu wa Inai, Bakuchi-uchi wa Sō Usobuita" (Japanese: 二度死んだヤツはいない、バクチ打ちはそう嘯いた)	Keiya Saitō	Kensaku Kojima	April 13, 2018	December 16, 2018
Nanbu is unable to stop the match between Junk Dog and Yūri, as the boss of the underground ring has allowed it to go ahead, Yūri gives himself a handicap by only fighting with one hand, but Junk Dog forces him to fight with both hands. Nevertheless Junk Dog is knocked out in the first round. Junk Dog gets up just as Yūri is leaving and tells him that he still is not satisfied. Yūri tells him that if he wants to fight him again then he needs to work his way up to fighting him in a proper Megalonia match. While out riding his motorcycle, Junk Dog sees a billboard that says "It's a wonderful District life. Not for your average joe." which further inspires him to enter Megalonia. Nanbu tells him that he would need a citizenship ID to enter the tournament. Junk Dog starts defying Nanbu and fights with his full strength, easily defeating his opponent in a fight he was supposed to lose, this gets Nanbu in trouble with the mob boss Fujimaki, who runs the underground ring. Nanbu manages to bargain his way out by telling Fujimaki that he'll pay him back with the money he'll earn when Junk Dog wins Megalonia. Fujimaki complies and creates a forged ID for Junk Dog, who chooses the name Joe.
3	"Gear Is Dead" / "You're Just Crying Sour Grapes. Machines Don't Breathe to Begin With."; Transliteration: "Zetsubō no Hate no Makeoshimi. Kikai wa Hanakara Iki Shicha nai" (Japanese: 絶望の果ての負け惜しみ。機械はハナから息しちゃない)	Takaaki Wada	Katsuhiko Manabe	April 20, 2018	January 6, 2019
Nanbu enters Joe into the Megalo Box rankings, which starts him at the very bottom in 257th place. He plans to have Joe fight the toughest opponents that the rankings will allow, so that he can move to the top bracket in as little as 5 fights. As the two visit Goskino Factory to get better gear, they notice the shopkeeper has a Shirato Group Composite Titanium Prototype Gear in the back room. A boy named Sachio and his friends enter with a bag of stolen cameras, which they exchange for Red Candy, a type of drug. Sachio realises there is not enough Red Candy for him and attacks the shopkeeper, who pulls a knife on the child. Joe intervenes but gets thrown out by Potemkin Higashi, a former Megalo Boxer. Nanbu plans to have Joe fight the 185th ranked Megalo Boxer, Shark Samejima, and the two begin their training. Sachio interrupts their training and asks them to take him to Megalonia. When they refuse he breaks into Goskino and steals the Prototype but gets caught. Joe, Nanbu and the other kids go to rescue him. Joe tries to fight Higashi while wearing the Prototype but it breaks apart, but surprisingly he's able to defeat him without it. Joe and Nanbu decide to take Sachio with them.
4	"Let's Dance with Death" / "I'd Rather Boogie with That Babe Than Dance with the Reaper."; Transliteration: "Shinigami to Odoru Yori, Ano Musume to Bugī o Odoritai" (Japanese: 死神と踊るより、あの娘とブギーを踊りたい)	Jirō Fujimoto	Kensaku Kojima	April 27, 2018	January 13, 2019
Joe enters the ring for his first professional match against Shark Samejima, but shocks the whole arena by not wearing any gear for the fight, being dubbed "Gearless" Joe, this is all part of Nanbu's plan to have him attract attention. Joe gets knocked down in the first round which badly disorients him, but he gets up at the 9th count just as the round ends. Shark loses his temper in the second round and fouls Joe, who spends the rest of the round dodging him. During the interval Sachio chastises both Joe and Nanbu, which allows the two to focus and get their priorities straight. Joe uses his footwork to KO Shark in the third round. Some time passes, during which Joe wins 2 more fights and climbs to rank 102 while gaining a reputation for himself, even grabbing Yukiko's attention. Nanbu visits an old acquaintance to meet Joe's next opponent who is rank 17, but is shocked to find that the challenger is someone from his past with a half-burned face.
5	"The Man from Death" / "So, Where Are You from? From the Other Side. From Hell."; Transliteration: "Anta wa Doko Kara Kitan da? Mukō Gishi da yo, Jigoku sa" (Japanese: あんたはどこから来たんだ？向こう岸だよ、地獄さ)	Takuya Wada	Katsuhiko Manabe	May 4, 2018	January 20, 2019
Nanbu's attempt to scout a high-ranking opponent for Joe's next match lands the 17th-ranked boxer — his ex-student Aragaki, who fell out with Nanbu after a military deployment led to him losing his legs in an explosive trap. Nanbu — then a legitimate coach – believed Aragaki dead after an initial news report mistakenly listed him as killed in action; when Aragaki returned to the gym, he was crushed to find it derelict and eventually demolished, and in his grief nearly kills himself. Aragaki tells Nanbu that he intends to destroy Joe as payback for betraying a promise that the gym would always be a home for him. Sachio researches Aragaki's boxing record since rejoining Megalo three years prior, and finds an unbroken string of brutal wins that leaves his opponents in critical condition. Nanbu wants to avoid the fight for fear of what Aragaki's retaliation could do to Joe, but Joe refuses to call it off. The fight begins, and Joe and Aragaki initially seem evenly matched, but an expertly timed blow from Aragaki in the middle of round 1 leaves Joe knocked down as the count approaches 10.
6	"Until the Last Dog Dies" / "The Midsummer Heat Might Drive a Dog to Kill, but It Will Never Break Him."; Transliteration: "Manatsu no Inu wa Hito o Koroshitaku Naru Atsu sa da ga, Kesshite Hetabarya Shinai" (Japanese: 真夏の犬は人を殺したくなる暑さだが、決してへたばりゃしない)	Yasuo Tsuchiya	Kensaku Kojima	May 11, 2018	January 27, 2019
Joe manages to get up at the 9th count and continues to fight Aragaki. Nanbu, believing the fight to be a lost cause, nearly throws in the towel, but Joe stops him and starts to fight back by evenly distributing his weight like Nanbu taught him. Recognizing the technique, Aragaki recalls memories from his time under Nanbu, and starts to break down as his anger overwhelms him; Joe lands a solid punch that nearly knocks Aragaki out. The fight continues through the fourth round, with both fighters receiving numerous blows, but ends before the fifth can begin due to a forfeit from Aragaki. Nanbu reconciles with Aragaki in the locker room, and Aragaki reveals that, due to the damage his leg implants endured during the fight, he risks being bedridden, and this was his last Megalo Boxing match. He gives Nanbu back a failed betting slip that Nanbu gave Aragaki as a good-luck charm, and which had stopped him from killing himself; he tells Nanbu to give it to Joe. Yukiko publicly announces Glen Burroughs as the 3rd card in Megalonia. Mikio Shirato tells Yūri that the general public cares more about "Gearless" Joe than the other boxers, but he has a plan to stop Joe from making it to Megalonia.
7	"The Road to Death" / "If You're Crossing This River, Don't Bother Paying for a Round Trip."; Transliteration: "San no na ga Tsuku Ano Kawa o Wataru no ni, Ōfuku no Funachin wa Muyō da" (Japanese: 三の名がつくあの川を渡るのに、往復の船賃は無用だ)	Jun'ichirō Hashiguchi	Katsuhiko Manabe	May 18, 2018	February 3, 2019
Joe continues to grow in popularity, but still has very little chance of being chosen for Megalonia. Mikio wins a match against Sugar R. Hill and tells the crowd that he will challenge Joe next. The Shirato Group's executive committee urges Yukiko to put Mikio in Megalonia but she has a different agenda and does not want her brother to get any further. Mikio tells Yukiko that he knows she set up his fight with Sugar in hopes of knocking him out of the runnings and she was also planning to set him up to fight Joe for the same reason. Mikio meets with Joe before their fight is due to start and reveals that he knows he's an illegal underground fighter with a fake ID and threatens to tell the world if he gets in the ring. Joe goes to punch Mikio but is stopped by Nanbu who knocks him out. Mikio wins the match by default when Joe does not enter the ring, and he vows to take back the Shirato Group from Yukiko.
8	"Deadline of the Dream" / "No One Else Tells You When It's Time to Give up on Your Dream."; Transliteration: "Anta no Yume no Shōmi Kigen o Kimeru no wa, Dare ka ja nai" (Japanese: あんたの夢の賞味期限を決めるのは、誰かじゃない)	Masahisa Koyata	Kensaku Kojima	May 25, 2018	February 17, 2019
After Mikio wins by forfeit, the Shirato Group plans to officially name him as the last finalist in Megalonia. After realizing that Mikio still has not revealed Joe's secret to the public, Nanbu decides to beg Fujimaki for some info on Mikio to force him into a rematch with Joe. Fujimaki tells Nanbu that someone asked for info on Joe's fake ID, but never got the full story from him or his men, leading Nanbu to realize that Mikio bluffed him with half-truths. Needing to get leverage on Mikio, Nanbu interrogates a former Gear engineer, who lets slip that Mikio led a team to create a Gear that could read the Gear of other fighters, trying to beat the team developing the integrated Gear that Yūri now wears on his arms. With this info, Nanbu realizes Joe might have a chance, and he tries every method he can to persuade Yukiko to call for a rematch. However, Yukiko is suspicious of Nanbu and locks him in a room. That night, as the ceremony is held to introduce the final four fighters for Megalonia, Joe crashes the scene on his bike and demands that Mikio fight him fairly. Yukiko decides to rip the fourth Megalonia ticket in half, giving one half each to Joe and Mikio, and declares whoever wins their rematch wins the final spot.
9	"A Dead Flower Shall Never Bloom" / "This Flower's Buds Smell Rotten, Its Seeds Returning to the Earth."; Transliteration: "Ano Hana no Tsubomi wa Fushū o Makichirashi, Tane wa Tsuchi ni Kaeru" (Japanese: あの花のつぼみは腐臭をまき散らし、種は土にかえる)	Tomio Yamauchi	Katsuhiko Manabe	June 1, 2018	February 24, 2019
Mikio is pummeling Joe in their official rematch, as Mikio's gear, Ace, has been significantly upgraded from before to learn Joe's moves and counter them within seconds. Yūri notes that Mikio upgraded his gear to be able to fight him, as a flashback shows Mikio using drugs to increase his synchronization with Ace to a higher level than normal. With none of his combinations working, Joe decides to drop his guard completely, confusing Ace's programming and leaving Mikio unable to finish Joe off. Further flashbacks show Mikio questioning whether the boxing ability is actually his, or that of Ace. Joe decides to bet everything on a counter-punch. Nanbu expects Mikio to throw a right straight, but instead Mikio punches with his left. However, Joe instinctively counters with an uppercut, knocking out Mikio and earning his spot in Megalonia. As Joe's Team Nowhere celebrates at their boat, Nanbu sneaks out of their post-fight party to meet with Fujimaki.
10	"The Die Is Cast" / "The Dice Have Been Thrown. You Can Double Your Bet If You Want."; Transliteration: "Sai wa Nagerareta. Daburu Appu de Betto Suru mo Yoshi" (Japanese: サイは投げられた。ダブルアップでベットするも良し)	Ryōsuke Senbo	Kensaku Kojima	June 8, 2018	March 3, 2019
As Joe comes outside to urinate, Nanbu tells him that the real bet he made with Fujimaki was to reach Megalonia and then throw the match upon reaching the semifinals. Joe is angered that Nanbu still wants him to throw a fight to save himself, and punches him before speeding away on his bike. Sachio overhears their argument, and runs away after feeling betrayed by Nanbu. Fujimaki tells Nanbu that if Joe does not throw the fight, he'll kill all three of them. Later, Nanbu finds Sachio, telling him that he found out about his past: Sachio's father designed the prototype Gear that Yūri wears, but his research was stolen by someone in the Shirato group and the man himself later turned up dead. Nanbu takes Sachio to Yukiko's mansion offering him a chance at revenge, but Sachio cannot bring himself to do it, so Nanbu instead convinces Yukiko to take custody of Sachio to protect him from Fujimaki. Later that night, as Yukiko tries to find the truth behind Sachio's father, Yūri defeats Pepe Iglesias to move on to the final round of Megalonia. Outside the arena, Joe and Yūri talk about their motivations while a drunken Nanbu stumbles around the boat, recalling Fujimaki telling him about The Scorpion and the Frog.
11	"A Deadmarch" / "Enough with the Gloomy Hymns. Gimme Something with Trumpets."; Transliteration: "Shinkikusai Sanbika wa Yoshite Kure. Hosshite Iru no wa Rappa da" (Japanese: 辛気臭い讃美歌はよしてくれ。欲しているのはラッパだ)	Yasuo Tsuchiya	Katsuhiko Manabe	June 15, 2018	March 10, 2019
Fujimaki's men escort Nanbu to the arena where Joe is slated to fight Glen Burroughs in their semifinal match. Meanwhile, Sachio refuses to go see the fight, thinking Joe and Nanbu both abandoned him for a rigged match. Nanbu is shown to the luxury suite where Fujimaki watches the fight, as Joe appears by himself in the ring, wearing his old Gear after a visit to his old mechanic friend. Nanbu instructs Joe to take a dive in the third round, while Fujimaki keeps a close eye on Nanbu, chiding him for acting like a real coach even though he's about to make him throw the fight. Nanbu hopes that this act will repay their debt, but Fujimaki states that Joe will be under his heel forever. As Joe gets pummeled in the corner, Nanbu tries to encourage Joe to continue fighting while his Gear falls off and he hits the mat. Suddenly Sachio appears ringside, yelling at Joe not to give up. Joe gets off the mat and manages to beat Burroughs with a counterpunch, knocking him out. Meanwhile, Nanbu begins to brawl against Fujimaki's men in the suite. As one of them points a gun at him, Nanbu grabs a knife. Meanwhile, Joe and Sachio are celebrating their victory, and then race to the suite where Nanbu has stabbed his remaining eye out as payment to Fujimaki. Impressed at the spectacle, Fujimaki decides to let the three go.
12	"Leap over the Edge of Death" / "If You're Going to Leave Your Album Behind at the Water's Edge, Then You Don't Want to Cross This Particular River"; Transliteration: "Kishibe ni Arubamu o Nokoshitai Nara, San no Kawa Kara Hikikaese" (Japanese: 岸辺にアルバムを残したいなら、三の川から引き返せ)	Yoshitaka Fujimoto	Kensaku Kojima	June 22, 2018	March 17, 2019 (Note: The first half of episode 12 of Megalo Box was run twice on Adult Swim, once 15 minutes before its scheduled start time and again in its normal start time, after a broadcasting error froze the airing of episode 6 of Sword Art Online: Alicization. This was likely done to fix the block's schedule after the unexpected error occurred.)
Yukiko signs a contract with the military for her company's integrated Gear development, but is shocked to discover that Yuri has decided to have his own Gear removed. Yuri states that he wants to fight Joe on equal terms, without any Gear. A newly-blind Nanbu invites Aragaki to help train Joe for the fight in his place, using his improved hearing to critique Joe's form. Meanwhile, Yuri visits Mikio at his cabin in the woods to get his Gear surgically removed. Later, Yukiko learns that Joe's ID badge is fake, and has an excuse to disqualify him from the tournament, but she holds off and decides to visit Yuri. Yuri slowly recovers from the pain of the surgery, and refuses Yukiko's help when she offers anesthesia, wanting to fight through the pain on his own. Later, Yukiko then visits Joe by the riverbank, telling him that she knows about the fake ID, but will not stop his fight with Yuri, as she cannot understand what made Yuri want to take such drastic action to fight him.
13	"Born to Die" / "Though the Flesh May Rot, the Bones Will Remain. They Are the Proof That You Were Alive."; Transliteration: "Niku wa Kuchite mo Hone wa Nokoru. Sore ga Sei o Uketa Akashi to Naru" (Japanese: 肉は朽ちても骨は残る。それが生を受けた証となる)	Yūjirō Abe	Katsuhiko Manabe	June 29, 2018	March 24, 2019
Joe and Yuri have their rematch in the finals of Megalonia, as Yuri enters the ring with his Gear removed to fight Joe on equal terms. Meanwhile, Yukiko tries to deal with her military clients who want to customize her Gear for weapons development, but she chafes at the idea. Though the recovery from surgery has depleted Yuri's stamina, he continues matching Joe blow-for-blow until he struggles to sip from his own water bottle after 12 rounds. In the 13th round, both fighters bet everything on one last punch. Suddenly, the episode shifts to one year in the future, where Nanbu has opened a new boxing gym called "Gym Nowhere." The next Megalonia tournament is about to begin, with the original winner having vacated their title. Yuri is shown in a wheelchair, and Joe later stops by the gym on his bike to deliver a couple packages. The ending title card reveals that "Gearless" Joe won the championship fight a year ago by K.O.

=== Megalobox 2: Nomad (2021) ===
No. overall	No. in season	Title	Directed by	Written by	Original release date
14	1	"Los fantasmas tararean un réquiem" / "Apparitions hum the requiem" Transliteration: "Bōrei-tachi wa Chinkonka o Kuchizusamu" (Japanese: 亡霊たちは鎮魂歌を口ずさむ)	Yō Moriyama	Katsuhiko Manabe	April 4, 2021
Roughly five years since he won the title belt at Megalonia, Joe wanders to different underground fighting rings with simple Megalo Boxing gear under the name "Nomad," his only stipulation that the fight be legit, while making money to fuel his painkiller addiction. After overhearing about another highly-skilled former pro Megalo Boxer called "Chief" racking up wins on the underground circuit and scaring off other challengers, Nomad offers to be his next opponent. Nomad recognizes Chief from the bar he visited the other night, while Chief appears to know his real identity as Joe. During the fight, Nomad realizes that Chief was the one paid to take a dive by the promoters when Nomad wins by KO on a weak punch. In the parking lot afterwards, Chief punches Nomad in the gut, taunting him for relying on painkillers. As Joe speeds off into the wilderness on his bike, he encounters a dead wolf and decides to bury him. Later, the ghost of Nanbu returns to haunt him.
15	2	"La desesperación da coraje a los cobardes" / "Despair brings courage to the cowardly" Transliteration: "Zetsubō wa Okubyōmono ni Yūki o Ataeru" (Japanese: 絶望は臆病者に勇気を与える)	Yukio Kuroda	Kensaku Kojima	April 11, 2021
Nomad registers himself for another fight when his motorbike is hotwired and stolen by an immigrant boy. He follows the boy back to a makeshift community in an abandoned amusement park where Nomad finds that the boy, Mio, already gave the bike and Megalo Boxing gear to his mother Marla for scrap. As she offers to help him repair the bike, Nomad collapses. He later wakes up in a trailer as the community is preparing for a festival. Suddenly, a construction crew appears and demands that the immigrants clear out, as the land is about to be sold at auction. However, Chief appears at the front, and convinces the crew to hold off demolition until the auction actually goes through. Later that night, Chief admits to Nomad that he is not a real ranked Megalo Boxer, but he pretended to be one so he could earn money by throwing matches. In the past, he was inspired by "Gearless" Joe's battle as an undocumented fighter himself to travel to this country and chase the dream of a better life. Mio overhears Chief refer to Nomad as Joe, and ends up telling a mob lieutenant named Tetsu about him. The next day, Nomad speeds off on his bike as mob boss Hikawa comes looking for Joe, only to find him gone, while Chief boasts about his plan to win the upcoming Megalobox tournament and buy his community's land back with the prize money. Meanwhile, Nomad flashes back to his last moments with Nanbu, and blames himself for his death as he opens another bottle of painkillers before a fight. The next night, Nomad returns to Chief, and offers to train with him, saying he stopped taking the drugs.
16	3	"Si deseas la dañina pudrición de las raíces, no bloquees la boca del ánfora" / "If you desire the illness of root rot then do not cover the drainage hole of the pot" Transliteration: "Wazurai no Negusare o Nozomu Nara, Mizugame no Ana o Fusagu na" (Japanese: 患いの根腐れを望むなら、水瓶の穴を塞ぐな)	Akira Shimizu	Kensaku Kojima	April 18, 2021
Joe works with Chief but suddenly collapses from withdrawal to the painkillers and memories of Nanbu's death. Meanwhile, Tetsu and his thugs lead a harassment campaign against the immigrants in the casa, quietly supported by Mio, hoping to drive them out before the auction. The opening day of The Grand Megalobox Tournament arrives, and Joe continues dealing with his inner demons, but his counterpunching strategy works as Chief wins his opening match with a first-round KO. Back at the casa, Marla tells Joe more about Chief's history: that he had a wife who died early on and a frail but brilliant son named Carlo who helped design Chief's Gear to focus on defense. When Carlo died on the journey to this country, Chief abused painkillers and alcohol until one day when his Gear broke down after a match, and Chief himself broke down in tears before swearing to honor Carlo's memory by getting clean. Later, as Chief and his community fix a sabotaged water pump, Joe reconciles with his memory of Nanbu. Joe then cuts his hair in time for the next tournament match, where Chief's acting abilities help him KO his opponent. Later that night, Tetsu's teenage thugs toss a molotov cocktail into the casa, setting Chief's trailer on fire. Chief rushes into the trailer as the flames suddenly expand.
17	4	"Si la flor del alma florece, el amor no se perderá" / "Love cannot be lost if a flower of the soul blooms" Transliteration: "Tamashii no Hana ga Sakeba, Ai o Ushinatta Tameshi wa nai" (Japanese: 魂の花が咲けば、愛を失ったためしはない)	Yūsuke Onoda	Katsuhiko Manabe	April 25, 2021
Though his trailer is destroyed, Chief managed to escape with minor burns and his box full of cash for the casa. Meanwhile, Mio takes the blame for the fire and decides to leave the casa on his own. As the finals of the tournament begin, the developer tells Hikawa that he does not care who wins as long as he gets paid for the lot. Hikawa's Megaloboxer, Mamiya, uses racist taunts and illegal punches to goad Chief into making critical mistakes, while Joe tries to pull him out of it. Chief and Mamiya are both worn down during the fight until Mio suddenly returns to cheer on Chief, giving him the resolve to KO Mamiya in the fifth round. With the winnings from the tournament combined with Chief's previous savings, his community has the money to buy their land. Chief convinces Joe to get back into Megaloboxing for real, and hopes to have a real match against him soon. The next day, Chief is shown dead in his truck. The community holds a funeral for Chief, as Marla finishes the purchase of the community's land, and Mio tells Joe that they decided to bequeath Chief's Gear in his memory. Joe thanks both Marla and Mio, and leaves the casa on his bike, as he plans to stop running from his past.
18	5	"La tierra prometida respondió que el mesías no se quedará" / "The promised land answered that the messiah would not stay." Transliteration: "Kyūseishu wa Iyashinai to Yakusoku no Chi wa Kotaeta" (Japanese: 救世主は居やしないと約束の地は答えた)	Yukio Kuroda	Katsuhiko Manabe	May 2, 2021
Joe returns to Gym Nowhere to find it a broken husk. Flashbacks reveal that Nanbu was fighting late-stage cancer while Edison Liu, Yuri's student, requested a match with Joe, who was mostly focused on running the orphanage and being a trainer at the gym. Joe wanted to win the money from the match in hopes of using it to pay for an experimental treatment for Nanbu, and spent several weeks training, but Sachio saw his actions as ignoring Nanbu while his condition got worse. In the present, Joe falls asleep in the broken gym, but wakes up to find an older Sachio attacking him. After seeing his face, Joe lets Sachio pummel him into unconsciousness. Later, Joe finds out from Aragaki that after a typhoon swept through the area over a year ago, Sachio managed to rescue the kids, but the gym was never restored. Everyone either went to an orphanage or took on other jobs. Sachio later asked Aragaki to teach him how to fight, but unlike Joe he did not have the natural talent for it, though he trained him anyway. Sachio later enters into an underground fighting ring and gets beaten badly, but refuses to talk to Joe as he leaves the arena.
19	6	"Aunque estés consciente de tu impotencia, Dios te ofrecerá su imagen para que la pises" / "Though you admit yourself to be powerless, still God offers his image to be stepped on" Transliteration: "Muryoku da to Jikaku Shite mo, Kami wa Fumie o Sashidasu" (Japanese: 無力だと自覚しても、神は踏み絵を差し出す)	Shunji Yoshida	Kensaku Kojima	May 9, 2021
As Joe fetches some water by a nearby riverbank, he spots Bonjiri who drops a flyer for his Chinese restaurant as he speeds off. At the restaurant, a couple of local gangsters start harassing Oicho, until Sachio smashes a bottle over one of their heads. The gangsters come back and ransack the restaurant before taking off with the deed to the building. Fujimaki later offers Sachio a chance to get the deed back if he can win a fight against a tougher opponent. Just before the fight, Joe decides to enter the ring in Sachio's place as Gearless Joe. Throughout the episode, Joe flashes back to his fight with Edison Liu, how Nanbu's condition took a turn for the worse minutes before the fight, and how Joe went down hard in the second round. In the present, Gearless Joe gets knocked out in the second round. As the children wait for Joe's return, Joe reveals he lost the fight, but got the deed back as part of his deal with Fujimaki, before Sachio tells Joe to leave.
20	7	"El tonto que muestra su carta no es un payaso estúpido" / "The Fool that the card signifies is not a halfwit jester" Transliteration: "Kādo ga Shimesu Orokamono wa Manuke na Dōkeshi ja nai" (Japanese: カードが示す愚か者は間抜けな道化師じゃない)	Kei Miura	Katsuhiko Manabe	May 16, 2021
Edison Liu trains hard for an upcoming bout against Mac Rosario. However, after Edison hears that Joe is back in town, he decides to confront Joe himself, asking him to be his sparring partner. Edison believes that despite beating Joe 5 years ago, the media and fans still see him as "Yuri's student" and not as a pro Megaloboxer in his own right, because he did not beat Joe in his prime. Meanwhile, Mac gives an interview to the media as they go over his history of being an ill-tempered Megaloboxer who decided to become a cop. Mac was paralyzed while saving innocents from a gang dispute, until a young CEO named Ryugo Sakuma got permission to test a new "Brain Encoding System" developed by his company, ROSCO. Mac got a fresh start in Megaloboxing, and Ryugo got a chance to display his product's results to the world. The next day, Joe shows up at Jimmy's Gym to practice with Edison, but are soon interrupted when they find Santa taping their fight to use in his next article. Edison swears to take on Joe for real after his fight with Mac. Finally, matchday arrives. Joe and the kids get ringside seats, though Sachio and Oicho do not show up. Yukiko encounters her brother Mikio. As Mac walks to the ring, he stares in Joe's direction.
21	8	"Al principio del fin, la trayectoria del arcoíris dibuja un soportal" / "Rainbow's trajectory draws an arc at the beginning of the end" Transliteration: "Owari no Hajimari ni, Niji no Kiseki wa Āchi o Kaku" (Japanese: 終わりの始まりに、虹の軌跡はアーチを描く)	Harume Kosaka	Kensaku Kojima	May 23, 2021
The match between Liu and Mac begins. An initially cautious Liu quickly figures Mac out and gains the upper hand. However, as the fight looks all but lost for Mac, he counterattacks with sudden focus and ferocity, a phenomenon known by his fans as "Mac Time". Liu goes down in a flash, and Mac is named the new champion. With Liu gravely injured and hospitalized, Yuri voices to Joe his feeling of guilt over pushing his own dreams onto Liu. Mac displays erratic behavior at home, forcibly taking food from his son Miguel. Maya, Mac's wife, brings her concerns to Sakuma, who appears sympathetic but simply attributes Mac's behavior to stress. Yukiko contemplates on the earlier meeting with her brother, where he claimed that "Mac Time" is the result of BES' negative effect on the brain.
22	9	"Una sola mano no basta para vivir, pero aun así la forma de vivir prevalece" / "The way in which to live cannot be counted on one hand, even still there are ways to survive" Transliteration: "Ikiru Sube wa Katate ja Tarinai ga, Ikikata wa Sore de mo Amaru" (Japanese: 生きる術は片手じゃ足りないが、生き方はそれでも余る)	Mitsutaka Uchitoya	Katsuhiko Manabe	May 30, 2021
Santa and Bonjiri start helping Joe restore Gym Nowhere. Yukiko secretly has ROSCO investigated, and discovers that ROSCO has been discussing the use of BES with the military. She confronts Sakuma and demands undisclosed experiment data on Mac in return for her cooperation. Sakuma seemingly complies, but orders the data to be manipulated before they are sent. At the hospital, Liu regains consciousness, but is told that he will not be able to fully recover and return to Megalo-boxing. Liu tells Joe that he will not give up, and that they will have a fight as promised. Joe visits Nanbu's grave and runs into a still-hostile Sachio, who tells Joe that Gym Nowhere died when Joe left years ago and that things cannot go back to normal just because Joe rebuilds the place. When a typhoon threatens the gym, Aragaki and Oicho join the group to help tie down the building. Mac becomes worried about his actions in the ring and his mental deterioration, but Sakuma encourages him to remember why he came back after walking away from Megalo-boxing.
23	10	"Las derrotas pasadas son acompañadas por señales de buena suerte" / "Past defeat is with the omen of good fortune" Transliteration: "Kako no Haiboku wa Kōun no Kizashi to Tomo ni Aru" (Japanese: 過去の敗北は幸運の兆しと共にある)	Yūsuke Onoda	Kensaku Kojima	June 6, 2021
Mac challenges Joe to a fight, but Joe is hesitant. Yukiko announces to a displeased Shirato Group board that she is considering severing ties with ROSCO because of the now-publicized risks and the potential military use of BES. ROSCO sends its head researcher, Yoshimura, to pressure Mikio Shirato to retract his thesis on the risks of BES. Mikio in turn suggests to his former student to accept and fix one's mistakes. Joe sees Mac visiting Liu in the hospital. Mac reveals how much Joe's journey to become the champion inspired him; Liu also encourages Joe to accept the fight. After recalling his time with Chief, Joe decides to fight Mac. Liu asks a reluctant Yuri to help Joe prepare, telling him that he should not blame himself for what happened. Joe comes to Sachio and the two have an impromptu fight; Joe tells Sachio that it was not Sachio's fault that he lost against Liu and left everyone behind years ago. Sachio agrees to come to Gym Nowhere, when Joe collapses.
24	11	"Cuando te quitas la armadura que no te podías quitar, brotan las semillas de la miseria y de la dicha" / "When removing the armor that cannot be taken off, the seed of fortune and misfortune sprout" Transliteration: "Nugenaku Natta Yoroi o Hazusu Toki, Fukō to Kōfuku no Tane ga Me o Dasu" (Japanese: 脱げなくなった鎧を外す時、不幸と幸福の種が芽を出す)	Shunji Yoshida	Katsuhiko Manabe	June 13, 2021
Joe is taken to the hospital, and the children and Aragaki learn about the damages to Joe's body from Megalo-boxing and his previous painkiller addiction. Maya is contacted by Asamoto from Shirato Group and asked about Mac's condition, but she says nothing. Sakuma tells Yukiko that ROSCO has no intention of parting ways with Shirato Group and giving up on BES. Yoshimura becomes increasingly concerned with the dangers of BES. Joe is discharged from the hospital shortly, and his friends hold a party at the newly-rebuilt Gym Nowhere to celebrate. Joe opens up about his experiences on the road and promises not to keep secrets. He then asks everyone for their thoughts on accepting Mac's challenge, which will likely be the final fight of his career. Despite their concerns, they agree to respect Joe's wishes and to help him prepare for the fight. Joe announces that he will not fight "Gearless" this time, but will instead use Chief's Gear. After another episode of mental breakdown, Mac is told by Maya that she offered him up to ROSCO's BES experiment back when he was paralyzed, in exchange for a heart transplant for their sick son. Mac confronts Sakuma, who insists that Maya made the right choice and that Mac was able to achieve great things because of it.
25	12	"Aunque las ovaciones se callen, la voz de los mudos no desaparecerá" / "You can't erase the voice of the voiceless even after the applauds end" Transliteration: "Kassai ga Nariyan de mo, Koe Naki Mono no Koe wa Keseyashinai" (Japanese: 喝采が鳴りやんでも、声なき者の声は消せやしない)	Tsutomu Murakami	Kensaku Kojima	June 20, 2021
Mac is despondent and wanders the streets. Joe begins training with Yuri and Aragaki, while the children work on improving and fitting Chief's Gear on Joe; their focus is not on defeating Mac, but on playing defensively so that Joe can finish the fight safely. Mac runs into an old colleague from his days as a police officer, who tells him how others look up to him, both as an officer and as a Megalo-boxer. Mac reminisces about his life and the story of the hummingbird and the nomad that he used to read to Miguel; the nomad wanders believing they have lost everything, but the hummingbird repeatedly reminds them of the things they still have and sings them a song. Mac decides to return home to his family. Mac tells Sakuma that he will do this fight his own way and walk away from ROSCO afterwards. The day of the exhibition match arrives.
26	13	"El con alas lleva al sin alas, y el sin alas bendice al con alas" / "Those with wings carry the wingless, Those without wings bless those with wings" Transliteration: "Tsubasa Aru Mono wa Tsubasa Naki Mono o Shoi, Tsubasa Naki Mono wa Tsubasa Aru Mono o Shukufuku Suru" (Japanese: 翼ある者は翼なき者を背負い、翼なき者は翼ある者を祝福する)	Harume Kosaka	Katsuhiko Manabe	June 27, 2021
Before the match, Yukiko informs Sakuma that both of them must take responsibility for the negative effects BES has had on Mac. It is revealed that Yoshimura brought the real data on Mac to Mikio and Yukiko, and that Mac and Maya asked for their help in revealing the truth and finishing the fight without entering Mac Time. Although Joe and Mac are evenly matched in the beginning of the fight, Joe goes down first due to his poor physical condition. However, Joe is able to come back and knocks down Mac in turn. Mac focuses on his family and is able to fight on at an exceptional level without entering Mac Time. As the fighters continue to trade blows, Sachio throws in the towel, just as he promised Joe earlier. Mac is declared the winner of the match. Yukiko announces that she is opening up BES technology to the world so that everyone can improve upon and benefit from it; she steps down from her company post, and Sakuma is arrested. Liu begins his rehabilitation training with Yuri. Joe returns to Gym Nowhere to be amongst his friends. They see off Sachio, who has decided to leave Gym Nowhere to pursue his original dream of becoming a Gear engineer.

== Home media release ==
=== Japanese ===
Name	Date	Discs	Episodes
Volume 1	July 27, 2018	1	1–4
Volume 2	September 26, 2018	1	5–9
Volume 3	November 22, 2018	1	10–13
Nomad	July 28, 2021	3	1–13

=== English ===
Name	Date	Discs	Episodes
Season 1	June 25, 2019	2	1–13
Season 2	April 5, 2022	2	1–13
