= Gearless Joe =

- Megalobox character
- Gearless Joe
- First appearance: Megalobox episode 1: "Don't Let the Simmering Fire Die. It'll Light the Way in the Dark" (2018)
- Created by: Yō Moriyama
- Voiced by: Yoshimasa Hosoya (Japanese); Kaiji Tang (English)

In-universe information
- Aliases: Junk Dog, Nomad

Gearless Joe (Japanese: ギアレスジョー, Hepburn: Giaresu Jō), also known by his aliases Junk Dog and later Nomad, is a fictional character and the main protagonist of the anime series Megalobox (2018) and its sequel Megalobox 2: Nomad (2021), produced by TMS Entertainment. Joe is a megalo boxer who first fights in illegal underground matches before rising to fame in the official Megalonia tournament, where he gains the nickname "Gearless Joe" after choosing to fight without mechanical gear.

Many noted how Joe paid respectful tribute to Jo Yabuki while forging his own path. The gritty visual style, powerful fights, and emotional storytelling surrounding Joe contributed to Megalobox being considered one of the best anime of its season. The character was created by director Yō Moriyama as an homage to Jo Yabuki, the protagonist of the classic boxing manga Ashita no Joe. Joe is voiced by Yoshimasa Hosoya in Japanese and Kaiji Tang in the English dub. Joe received widespread acclaim from critics and fans. Reviewers praised him as a compelling and relatable protagonist with a strong emotional arc. His rise from anonymity to stardom in the first season was seen as a classic sports underdog tale. In the second season, critics appreciated the mature exploration of trauma, loss, and redemption, calling Joe's character development one of the most impressive aspects of Nomad.

== Character overview ==
In the first season of Megalobox, Joe fights under the alias Junk Dog in underground fixed matches managed by his trainer, Gansaku Nanbu. Despite his talent, he yearns for a real fight. After a chance encounter with Yuri, the reigning Megalo Boxing champion, Joe becomes determined to challenge him in the official Megalonia tournament. To stand out, he competes without mechanical gear, earning the nickname "Gearless Joe". Nanbu devises this approach to attract attention to their underdog story and build hype around Joe's raw fighting style.

In the sequel, Megalobox 2: Nomad, Joe reappears under the alias Nomad. Haunted by his past and the death of Nanbu, he suffers from drug addiction and depression. Joe lives as a drifter until he meets an immigrant community and a young boxer named Chief, who helps him begin his path to redemption. Through these interactions, Joe starts to recover emotionally and gradually returns to boxing—not for fame, but to atone for his mistakes.

Both voice actors were praised for their performances, with particular acclaim for capturing Joe's emotional intensity and internal struggle in the second season.

== Creation and concept ==
Megalobox was created to commemorate the 50th anniversary of Ashita no Joe. Director Yo Moriyama and the creative team developed Joe as a modern reinterpretation of Jo Yabuki, adapting the underdog narrative for a futuristic setting. Joe's rival, Yuri, was modeled after Tōru Rikiishi, Jo Yabuki's iconic rival in the original manga. Real-life boxing footage and fighters were used to inspire the choreography and aesthetic of Joe's fights. Megalobox director Yo Moriyama stated Gearless Joe and Yuri were loosely based Jo Yabuki and Rikishi from the manga Ashita no Joe as Megalobox is a tribute to such manga, respectively, as he views that the rivalry of two boxers was the main event of Ashita no Joe which Megalobox adapted. Originally, the series was meant to have Rikishi as the lead character but the idea was scrapped and Gearless Joe was created. Every episode of the series end with the note "Not Dead Yet..." which was created by Moriyama. It is a message saying that Joe will not die. During production of the first series, the staff portrayed him as fighting throughout each episode. It was also a message for the Ashita no Joe fans because in such series, there was a dead involving Joe and Rikishi. He did not aim to give the series the same ending but instead come across with an unexpected ending for the viewers.

Moriyama said the first two episodes were developed to introduce the entire narrative and setting together while aiming to develop the future cast in later episodes. Joe's fighting style was loosely inspired by Jake LaMotta. A theme besides individualism featured in the series is "for people to live"; Moriyama elaborates that there was a focus on three main characters despite Joe being the lead while also showing similarities with the cast from Ashita no Joe. In the first season's finale, Joe faces Yuri. Moriyama was initially mixed about how the battle should end until deciding to make Joe the winner which was appreciated by other staff members who were rooting for Joe. For the second season, Joe's more somber and broken demeanor was a deliberate choice. The staff aimed to depict a fallen hero struggling with guilt and grief, allowing for a deeper emotional journey than in the first season.

The staff had mixed thoughts about how they should handle Joe as a depressed adult despite his young days as Megalonia's champions as that was how the first season ended. Moriyama decided to touch new themes to make Megalobox become a more independent work rather than keep staying as a tribute to Ashita no Joe. The staff highlighted Joe's depressing portrayal as he has not been able to move on with his life in contrast to Yuri and other returning characters. In order to support Joe's psychological state, the character of Chief was written. Across the narrative, Chief serves as a mentor to Joe in the first four episodes where his slowly recovers his fighting spirit. In early stages, Moriyama drew the encounters between the characters Joe and Chief, and the things that react to each other. Joe's sin that torments him would be kept vague until the fifth episode where Joe is forced to fight himself. From there, more boxing matches were written. However, in contrast to the first season which Joe's characterization was kept simple as he was obsessed to only defeat Yuri, the second season was written in a more complex way as the writers decided to make the impact of victory or defeat be less important for the boxers.

=== Casting ===
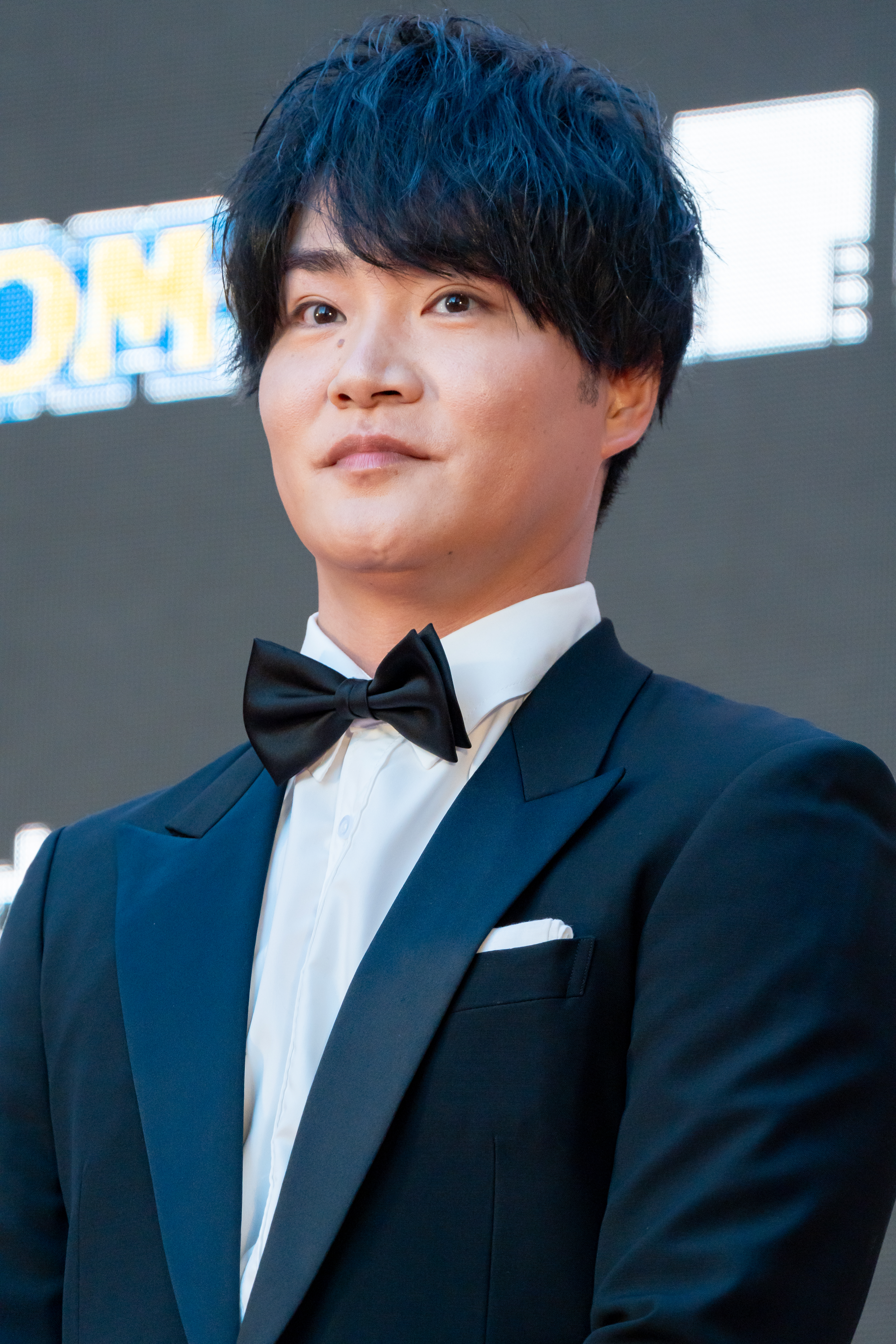
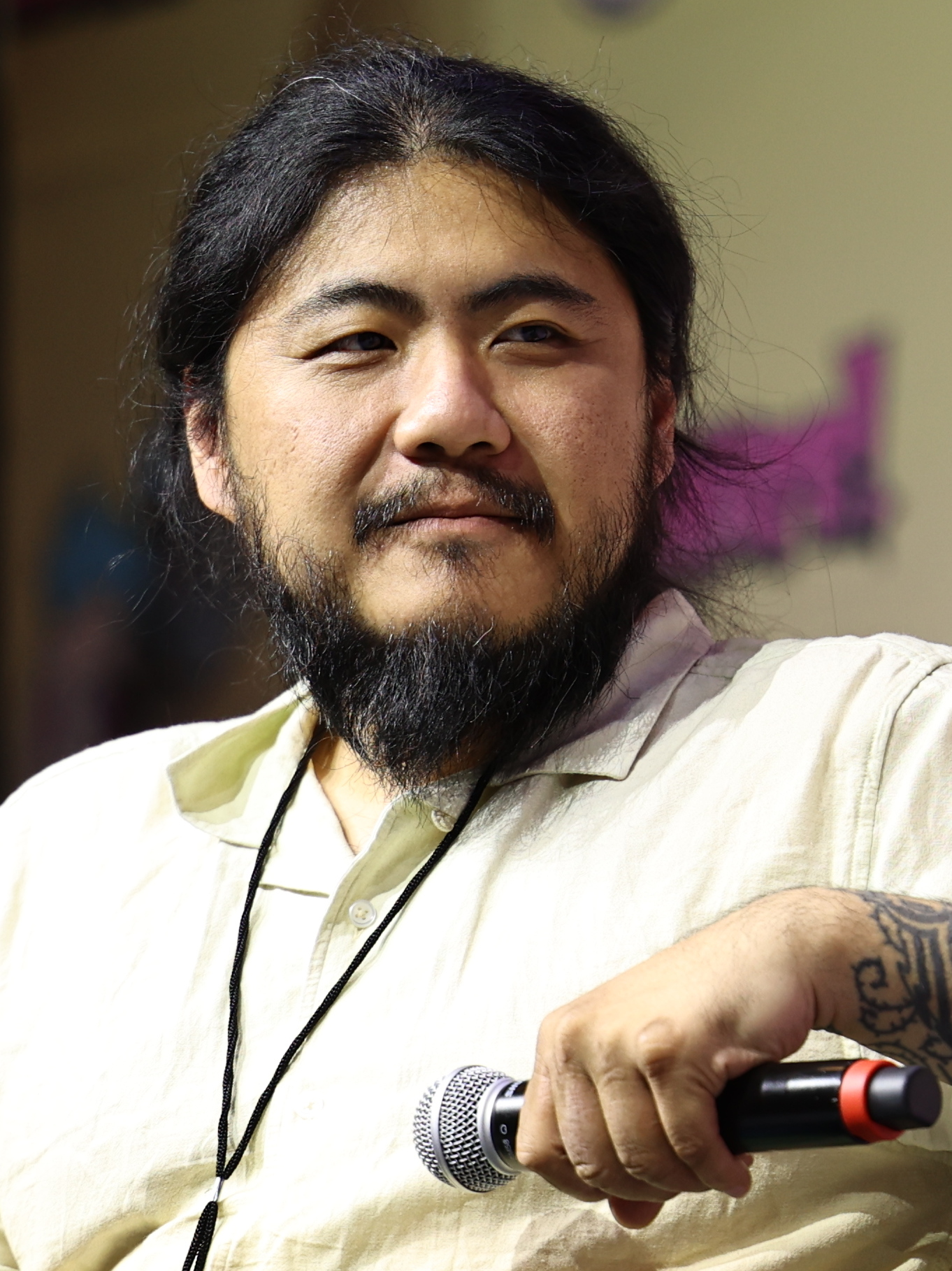
Gearless Joe is voiced by Yoshimasa Hosoya (left) in Japanese and Kaiji Tang (right) in English.

Voice actor Yoshimasa Hosoya who plays Gearless Joe, and was present at the screenings, said he was moved by the premiere due to how carefully handled were both Joe and Yuri's characters through the scene when the two meet on a rainy road. Hosoya felt that there was a character to Joe's character upon meeting Yuri due to the presence of the later. Being an Ashita no Joe fan, Hosoya was glad with he giving the role of Joe and give his best when playing the protagonist of Megalobox.

In the making of the second season, Yoshimasa Hosoya was surprised by the announcement and felt ready for the new changes given to Joe's character. Other returning voice actors were curious about the narrative as their characters did not appear in early episodes. Hosoya noted the response to the first season was not popular only in Japan but also Western regions as a result of the multiple letters the team received. Hosoya noted the response to the first season was not popular only in Japan but also Western regions. When asked about the impression of the character of this work, which was set seven years after the previous work, Hosoya did not know that he was Joe at first when he saw the bearded and transformed Joe in the main visual of the second season. Joe's new name, Nomad, is meant to give a new impression about how the story changed.

In making the English dub of the series, producer Dave Casipit stated that both the cast in general "suck at communicating" specifically pointing Joe and Yur's portrayals due to how they act more rather than talk due to their quiet personalities. As a result, he wanted to make sure the characters did not act rushed. During recording, Kaiji Tang's performance surprised Casipit. He aimed to make the audience note that Joe is not a hero or that Yuri is a villain in the series. He added that he "wanted the audience to hear that it hurts and that he's only just controlling the fury inside him, even if he's decided he's just going to do his job. That, in my opinion, is closer to the spirit of the anime than having him simply being an angry rebel all the time." Tang did research on fighter's breathing during box matches in order to portray Joe. The first minutes of the first episode were Tang's favorite scenes especially the part when Joe is riding a bike based on the storytelling and animation. He said that the message he wants to give is that "You can always move forward" and felt that while the series never explain his character's past, Joe wants to reach his goals in the future as he never had something treasured.

== Appearances ==
=== Megalobox ===
Gearless Joe is introduced in the anime Megalobox as "Junk Dog", an underground Megaloboxer from the outskirts of town whose real name is unknown, he is forced to throw fights to earn money for his crooked manager. He initially fights with old Gear that is constantly in need of repair. He starts a rivalry with Yuri, the champion of Megalonia who knocks out in the first round. Nanbu enters Joe into the Megalo Box rankings which starts him at the very bottom in 257th place, he plans to have Joe fight the toughest opponents that the rankings will allow, so that he can move to the top bracket in as little as 5 fights. Joe enters the ring for his first professional match against Shark Samejima, but shocks the whole arena by not wearing any gear for the fight, being dubbed "Gearless" Joe, this is all part of Nanbu's plan to have him attract attention. Some time passes, during which Joe wins 2 more fights and climbs to rank 102 while gaining a reputation for himself. His next rival is Nanbu's former student Aragaki who tries to get his revenge on Nambu for forgetting about him by killing Joe. Eventually, Aragaki quits the fight.

Joe continues to grow in popularity, but still has very little chance of being chosen for Megalonia. Mikio Shirato meets with Joe before their fight is due to start and reveals that he knows he is an illegal underground fighter with a fake ID and threatens to tell the world if he gets in the ring. Joe goes to punch Mikio but is stopped by Nanbu who knocks him out, Mikio wins the match by default when Joe does not enter the ring. The following night, as the ceremony is held to introduce the final four fighters for Megalonia, Joe crashes the scene and demands that Mikio fight him fairly. Yukiko decides to rip the fourth Megalonia ticket in half, giving one half each to Joe and Mikio, and declares whoever wins their rematch wins the final spot. Joe manages to defeat Mikio. Nanbu tells him that the real bet he made with Fujimaki was to reach Megalonia and then throw the match upon reaching the semifinals. Initially, Joe goes according to his plan to protect him but both Sachio and Nanbu support him to win even though the latter loses one eye as a result. In the finals, Joe and Yuri have their rematch, as Yuri enters the ring with his Gear removed to fight Joe on equal terms. Joe becomes the new champion but remains on friendly terms with Yuri.

=== Megalobox 2: Nomad ===
In the second season he takes on the moniker "Nomad" (ノマド, Nomado), drifting to different underground fighting rings with simple Gear and fighting opponents to fund his painkiller addiction. It's mentioned in the background that some time after vacating his Megalonia belt, he lost an exhibition match to Yuri's disciple and the next champion, Edison Liu, and has not been seen in a pro Megaloboxing match since. After meeting Chief, Joe decides to be his cornerman while Chief and Marla help him fight his painkiller addiction. Following Chief's death, Joe returns to his old gym to face his parts which causes mayhem with Sachio who still blames him for abandoning them and letting Nambu die while he was trying to win a match.

Although Joe and Mac are evenly matched in the beginning of the fight, Joe goes down first due to his poor physical condition. However, Joe is able to come back and knocks down Mac in turn. Mac focuses on his family and is able to fight on at an exceptional level without entering Mac Time. As the fighters continue to trade blows, Sachio throws in the towel, just as he promised Joe earlier.

== Reception ==
Critical response to Joe's characterization in the first season was positive. Anime News Network praised the character of Joe, most notably due to the handling of his fights which were felt as the biggest appeal from the series despite saying his character arc is not innovative comparing them to the Rocky boxing films. Tang's performance as Joe was well received by the writer nevertheless. Otaku USA liked how Joe's character changes across the narrative as he goes from a fighter who does arranged matches to a more competitive boxer driven his rivalry with Yuri and pride. Manga.Tokyo also praised the handling of the main character whom the audience would cheer. He positively compared Gearless Joe with Jo Yabuki as, despite the series being a tribute to Ashita no Joe with multiple similarities, he comes across as more likable character than the arrogant Jo describing him as a "much more down to earth, easy-going loveable rogue, kind of like Spike Spiegel from Cowboy Bebop". As a result, he views Gearless Joe as an improvement over the original Jo but felt his rivalry with Yuri lacked depth despite him being his final rival in the first season. Biggest in Japan wrote an article titled "Megaloxbox isn't Really About Boxing, it's About Human Drama" where he wrote that despite having raw talent for boxing, the protagonist is not given the possibilities to participate in professional matches due to his humble beginnings in the series' first episodes. As a result, the fear he expresses when entering into the competition Megalonia feels natural due to high probabilities of Joe dying in the ring, which he felt were inspiring. The final fight between Joe and Yuri was praised by Anime News Network for how well executed it was and the way the narrative treats it in such a way that the fact if Joe might not win it would not matter because the message of the series was about trying instead. The aftermath of the fight also received feedback because the ending of the season shows the impact Joe made in the scenario as he inspired multiple children to try boxing in Nowhere. Manga.Tokyo agreed with Anime News Network for how entertaining was the final fight not only due to their exchanges but also because of how both matured. In 2019, Joe was nominated for the 3rd Crunchyroll Anime Awards in the categories of "Best Protagonist" and "Best Boy", but lost to Rimuru Tempest from That Time I Got Reincarnated as a Slime and Izuku Midoriya from My Hero Academia, respectively. In the 6th Crunchyroll Anime Awards, Joe was nominated for "Best Protagonist", but lost to Odakawa from Odd Taxi. Michael B. Jordan revealed that the emotional foundation for Joe's fights in Megalobox inspired the film Creed III.

In regards Joe's portrayal in the sequel, Anime News Network wrote, like Biggest in Japan, that the character still feels faithful to the idea of the importance of human drama rather than sports based on his depressed state over Nambu's death. The writer was moved by how Joe interacted with immigrants, most notably the boxer Chief due to how gradually accepts their way of living due to their differences in regards to how the two had different priorities at the times of fights: while Joe is a dedicated boxer, Chief instead chooses to participate in arranged matches to provide for his people. The Fandom Post was surprised by Joe's depression over his coach's death and how he became addicted to painkillers to escape from reality. Nevertheless, he still enjoyed the fact that the character could fight in an entertaining fashion and there were several hints about why Joe feels his guilty over Nambu's death. In a following review, Fandom Post enjoyed Joe's support to Chief's through his fights and like the parallelism there was between this two characters as Chief is also hunted by the death of a person, his son, but criticized how Joe's motive was not fully explained yet. With Chief's death, the writer from Anime News Network felt that Joe has faced enough trauma and earned the courage to face reality thanks to their interactions. The eventual reason behind Nambu's death was felt to be heartfelt by The Fandom Post due to how Joe wanted to escape from reality to fight again under the excuse of earning money for Nambu's treatment but lost and shortly afterwards he died. Meanwhile, the present Joe was felt to be caring as he allows himself to be defeated in an arranged match in order to provide for Sachio even if his friend will never forgive him for abandoning Nambu.

== See also ==
- Ashita no Joe
