= Tōru Rikiishi =

Toru Rikiishi
- 'Ashita no Joe' character
- Created by: Asao Takamori; Tetsuya Chiba
- Voiced by: Shūsei Nakamura (1970 TV series, film); Takeshi Aono (1980 TV series)

Toru Rikiishi (Japanese: 力石 徹, Hepburn: Rikiishi Tōru) is a fictional character appearing in the manga series Ashita no Joe by Asao Takamori and Tetsuya Chiba. Toru Rikiishi is depicted as Joe Yabuki's rival and a professional featherweight boxer, who landed in a juvenile detention centre for punching an audience member to death after claiming his match was rigged. Later in the series, in order to box Joe Yabuki, Toru Rikiishi had to cut his weight from featherweight to bantamweight. Yabuki, knocked him out and the ring ropes hit his neck, which—combined with the weakness from his weight loss—became the cause of his death after the match.

== Creation ==
Rikiishi Toru was created by Asao Takamori and illustrated by Tetsuya Chiba as Joe Yabuki's main rival. He is depicted with a calm demeanor and stoic appearance.

Originally Toru Rikiishi was going to be the same weight class as Joe Yabuki. However, Tetsuya Chiba had drawn Toru Rikiishi too big and muscular, which received a bad reception from fans, which inspired Asao Takamori to implement the weight loss arc.

Tetsuya Chiba later reflected about the harshnesses of Rikiishi's extreme weight loss arc and his sacrifices. During the serialisation of Ashita and Takamori debated the decision to kill off Rikiishi, which was ultimately favoured by Chiba. Tetsuya Chiba remarked, "Do we really have to make him go through that much pain so many times? It would be a lie if I was fine with that... I just couldn't portray a lie about my own feelings."

== Reception ==
Toru Rikiishi was well received by fans, particularly the working class. He went on to become an iconic character in Japanese pop-culture.

So much so that after Rikiishi's death, on March 24, 1970 a real life Buddhist funeral was held for him in Kodansha's headquarters organised by poet and playwright Shuji terayama attended by 700-800 fans. The death impacted the working class.
