= Tiger Mask donation phenomenon =

Charitable donations of goods under a fictional character's name

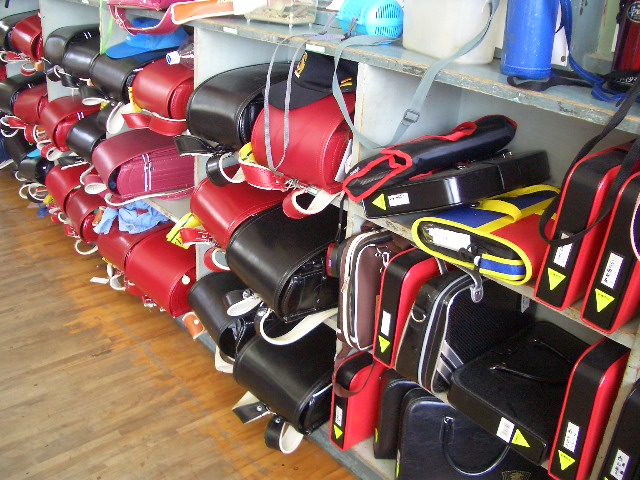
Randoseru backpacks at a school, the main object in donations to orphanages across Japan

The Tiger Mask donation phenomenon is a series of donations of randoseru (school backpacks) and other items to orphanages around Japan. The first donation happened when someone left ten 30,000-yen backpacks at a child guidance center in Gunma Prefecture on Christmas Day in 2010. A note attached to the bags was signed "Naoto Date", the real name of the titular character of Tiger Mask, a popular 1960s and 1970s manga about a wrestler who fought for orphans, being raised in an orphanage himself. Since the initial donation, copycat donations have appeared around Japan at various facilities for children, ranging from more backpacks to toys, food, and monetary gifts.

== Character background ==
Many of the donations have been made under the name of Naoto Date, a character in the manga and anime Tiger Mask. In the manga and anime, Tiger Mask (whose real name was Naoto Date) was a feared heel wrestler in America who was extremely vicious in the ring. However, he became a face after returning to Japan when a young boy said that he wanted to be a villain like Tiger Mask when he grew up. The boy lived in an orphanage, the same one that Tiger Mask grew up in during his childhood. Feeling that he did not want the boy to idolize a villain, Tiger was inspired to be a heroic wrestler and fights for the children in the orphanage.

== Donations ==
=== First donation ===
On 25 December 2010, in Maebashi City, Gunma Prefecture, a child guidance center was visited by someone leaving ten 30,000-yen (about US$360) backpacks: five black backpacks wrapped with blue ribbons, and five red backpacks wrapped with pink ribbons. A card attached to the bags simply said:

Please use these backpacks for the children.

(signed) Naoto Date

The backpacks were to be distributed between six orphans from six different orphanages in Gunma.

=== Second donation ===
A second donation was found by a security guard at the Odawara Child Guidance Center in Kanagawa Prefecture on 1 January 2011. Six backpacks, three black and three red, were left. A note left behind stated:

A New Year's gift — Naoto Date
The donation of backpacks in Gunma last year moved me deeply. My heart skipped a beat when I heard the news. Thinking I might do something as well, I offer these gifts. May the Tiger Mask movement live on.

As with the ten original backpacks in Gunma, they were left with a note signed by Naoto Date. The backpacks were to be distributed to new arrivals at the local orphanages and other children that Odawara Child Guidance center serves.

=== Copycat donations ===
Japan has around 580 children's centers that house around 30,000 children.

As of January 11, 2011, over 100 donations inspired by Tiger Mask have been reported across Japan. After the two initial donations, many other orphanages and children's facilities began to receive copycat donations of backpacks. Some have also received toys, food, and money to help pay for new backpacks. In addition, parallels to other anime and manga concerning orphaned children have also crept into the donation phenomenon.

"Tiger Mask/Naoto Date" donations and copycat donations
Location / date	Items left	Note left / circumstances
Nagano City; January 7, 2011	* Three black backpacks in boxes gift-wrapped in blue. * Three red backpacks in boxes gift-wrapped in pink.	"...I also have a child who is entering first grade this year." "A belated Santa Claus."
Shizuoka City; January 7, 2011	100,000 yen in cash in an envelope, postmarked from the nearby city of Shimada on January 6, 2011.	"A New Year's Gift Happy New Year! I wish everyone who takes care of the children at the Shizuoka Home a good year. It's not much, but it would make me happy if I can help the children grab hold of their hopes and dreams." "Naoto Date"
Okinawa; January 7, 2011	Three randoseru	A helmeted man, described as being in his 40s, left the three backpacks and a note signed "Naoto Date" at the Shimazoe no Oka orphanage in Nanjō City. The children at the orphanage were reported to have exclaimed in joy, "Wow! He even came to Okinawa!" Note: "I present these to those of you entering first grade. From someone who loves you from the heart, gambare! (Do your best!)"
Gifu; January 8, 2011	Five backpacks in gift-boxes	Note: "To all of you entering first grade: Congratulations! Naoto Date."
Atsugi, Kanagawa January 9, 2011	Two red bags containing twenty-two models and toys, including: * Eleven SD Gundam models * Two Fraulein Revoltech models from The Idolmaster by Kaiyodo * Hot Wheels car * Rubik's Cube * Two plush toys	Found in the parking lot of the center. Note: "I'm sorry these aren't backpacks. Naoto Date."
Nagasaki, Nagasaki; January 9, 2011	Seven new red and pink randoseru	Left by an elderly woman at the Nagasaki Handicapped Children and Women's Support Center. Note: "A donation by the Nagasaki Naoto Date." The word "Hibakusha" was also written on the note.
Nanjō, Okinawa; January 9, 2011	Two randoseru	Due to a miscommunication by a staff member, two more backpacks were delivered to help out five children in addition to the already donated three backpacks by a helmeted "Naoto Date."
Hanamaki, Iwate; January 9, 2011	100,000 yen	Found in a customer suggestion box at the Ito-Yokado store in Hanamaki. Note: "Please use this for children with a future ahead of them. Naoto Date."
Miyakonojō, Miyazaki; January 9, 2011	Plastic bag with five notebooks covered with anime characters and pencils	Note: "I'm sorry this is just a small gift, but it's from my heart. Naoto Date"
Shizuoka, Shizuoka; January 10, 2011	Six randoseru	Speculated to be a second donor than the one from January 7, a local luggage store was visited by a masked man claiming to be from Tokyo who bought six of the bags worth 233,100 yen (US$2,800) in cash on Saturday afternoon. Note: "I'm sorry for being late. Naoto Date."
Iwaki, Fukushima; January 10, 2011	200,000-yen (US$2,400) "children's gift certificate"	Discovered by a 13-year-old first-year middle school boy on the front door knob at the Iwaki Ikueisha center. Note: "I offer this somewhat belated New Year's gift. Please give everything you've got in studying and sports, and grow up to be wonderful adults. Naoto Date."
Yokohama, Kanagawa; January 10, 2011	Mailed package with six pencil sharpeners, four sets of twenty four colored pencils, and ten dozen pencils	Anonymous donor was inspired by the Tiger Mask donations.
Akō, Hyōgo; January 10, 2011	Four randoseru	Left at a police station due to the donor unable to find an orphanage.
Tottori, Tottori; January 10, 2011	Box of stationery supplies	In an accompanying envelope, in addition to quoting the Tiger Mask theme song, a message stated, "Please tell the children that they are never alone and that the world has not abandoned them just yet."
Shimonoseki, Yamaguchi; January 10, 2011	Two randoseru with a DVD copy of Hayao Miyazaki's Laputa: Castle in the Sky.	In Laputa, the two main characters (Sheeta and Pazu) have grown up without parents, similar in circumstance to Tiger Mask. The note stated: "The appearances of Tiger Mask all over Japan moved me. But I am not Tiger Mask. [...] Unfortunately, I could not provide more backpacks [...] Study hard, make friends, and grow up to be Tiger Mask — a kind of hero I couldn't be."
Okayama, Okayama; January 11, 2011	Two backpacks and two boxes of kibi dango (millet dumplings)	Donor mentions references to Momotarō, a Japanese folk tale of a boy who is found by an old couple in a giant peach. The kibi dango included in the donation plays a role in the tale where Momotaro, in a quest to defeat some oni, recruits three animals (dog, monkey and pheasant) to help him by feeding them his rations of dango.
Himeji, Hyōgo; January 11, 2011	Two randoseru and two paint sets	Found at a children's nursing home, signed by "Joe Yabuki", the title character in Ashita no Joe. In the manga, Joe was raised in a nursing home before becoming a boxer.

=== 2011 Tōhoku earthquake and tsunami ===
Sometime during the night of March 17 - morning of March 18, three cars parked at an evacuation center in Yamadamachi, Iwate had their tanks filled up and two 20-liter containers of heating oil were left outside the center by an unknown person. An evacuee discovered the donation upon starting his car and noticing his fuel gauge go from nearly empty to full. The evacuee noted: "We had hardly any fuel left. We were in a real pinch. I'm so grateful for the donation. I reckon it was Tiger Mask." The evacuation center noted that they would use the heating oil during the night to conserve fuel due to the ongoing crisis. Other child welfare offices and agencies have reported increased, anonymous donations in the aftermath of the disaster.

=== Cultural aspects ===
Because tax benefits for charitable donations are limited in Japan, a culture of charity donations has never really taken root. For example, the ratio of charitable donations by individuals in Japan is 52.5%, compared with 82.7% for the US. Also, Japanese culture emphasizes modesty, which means that Japanese people are generally reluctant to do good deeds in public view. Therefore, the Tiger Mask movement assuages both cultural inhibitions towards charitable deeds; it gives people in Japan a reason to donate while allowing them to do so anonymously.

Several donators left notes purportedly from other fictional characters from franchises outside the Tiger Mask series. Notable characters who "donated" include Rei Ayanami and Ryoji Kaji from Neon Genesis Evangelion, Haruhi Suzumiya, and Stitch. In April 2020, an anonymous donator left over 100 facemasks and other hygiene supplies at a nursing school in Ichinoseki, Iwate, claiming to be the character Inosuke Hashibira from the manga Demon Slayer: Kimetsu no Yaiba.
