= Kaze no Yō ni =

Japanese manga

風のように
- Manga
- Written by: Tetsuya Chiba
- Published by: Kodansha
- Magazine: Shojo Friend
- Published: 1969
- Anime television film
- Directed by: Toshiyuki Honda
- Music by: Ko Nakagawa
- Studio: Ekura Animal
Released

Kaze no Yō ni (風のように) or Like the Wind is a Japanese one-shot manga by Tetsuya Chiba, published in Shojo Friend in 1969. In early 2016, Chiba began a crowdfunding campaign to raise money for an anime film adaptation. It met its goal of 2 million yen that March.

== Plot ==
The manga takes place in a rural town in Japan. It focuses on Sanpei, a beekeeper and lone survivor of an accident that killed his entire family. While traveling alone, he meets a girl named Chiyo, who Sanpei helps after she is stung by a bee. Having nowhere else to go, he tries to begin a new life in her town. Sanpei begins to tend to an abandoned planting spot, but suddenly disappears afterwards. Soon the town begins to bloom with the flowers he planted, and Chiyo waits for Sanpei to return.

== Voice cast ==
- Masako Nozawa as Sanpei
- Minami Fukuhara as Chiyo
- Hana Takeda as Kamekichi
- Asako as Sabu
- Aine Shiono as Kunio
- Megu Ashiro as Shige
- Yuri Noguchi as Sachi
- Junpei Asashina as Sensei
- Reiko Suzuki as Osen
- Hiroki Maeda as Tora
- Toshiya Chiba as Masakichi
- Takayuki Yoshi as Jisuke
- Masaaki Yano as Mosaku
- Megumi Miyatsu as Tsune
- Norio Takaku as Sanpei's Father
- Shiori Inoue as Otome
- Michiyo Yanagisawa as Narrator

== Reception ==
Masako Nozawa won Best Voice Actor at the 26th Japanese Movie Critics Awards for her performance in the Kaze no Yō ni anime film.
