= Akakichi no Eleven =

Japanese manga series

- Volume 1 of the first edition of the manga, dated 1970
- Genre: Sports (Football)
- Manga
- Written by: Ikki Kajiwara
- Illustrated by: Mitsuyoshi Sonoda
- Published by: Shōnen Gahōsha
- Magazine: Shōnen King
- Original run: 1970 – 1971
- Volumes: 6
- Anime television series
- Directed by: Takeshi Yamada; Nobuhiro Okasako
- Studio: Tokyo TV Douga
- Original network: Nippon Television
- Original run: April 13, 1970 – April 5, 1971
- Episodes: 52

Akakichi no Eleven (赤き血のイレブン, Akakichi no Irebun; literally "Red-Blooded Eleven") is a manga series written by Ikki Kajiwara with drawings by Mitsuyoshi Sonoda. An anime adaptation produced by Tokyo TV Douga aired between 1970 and 1971, which consists of 52 episodes lasting about 24 minutes. The series aired in Japan on Nippon Television from 13 April 1970 to 5 April 1971, every Monday. In Italy it was broadcast for the first time in 1982, through local TV stations. Other transmissions aired on Super 3, Naples Channel 21 and TMC, with a different assembly of the opening theme and the end, and was better known by the title "ARRIVANO I SUPERBOYS". It is the first anime dedicated to soccer. It gained popularity among male soccer players at the time. It emphasizes players' psychology and spirit rather than technical aspects of the game.

== Plot ==
In the new neighborhoods that sprung up in the countryside on the outskirts of Tokyo is Shinsei High School. Among the students is the young and restless Shingo Tamai, a first year student. At the beginning of the school year he presents the new coach of the soccer team, Tenpei Matsuki, who was also a former goalkeeper of the Japanese national football and bronze medal winner at the Olympic Games in Mexico. Matsuki intends to build a team that can compete at the highest levels. His intense workouts originally seems too much for many members of the team, including Shingo. He decides to boycott the team's "official" Matsuki team and creates his own. After a first victory, he is always defeated by that of Matsuki, which begins to be seen by Shingo as an invincible enemy. Subsequently, the two will be able to clarify their conflicting relationship and Shingo will eventually become the captain of the only school team coached by Matsuki.

== Main characters ==
=== Shinsei High School ===
- Shingo Tamai (Voiced by: Ryōichi Tanaka)

Position: Forward
The protagonist of this story, he is a freshman (1st year in Japan) high school soccer player. He is from downtown Tokyo and possess strong physical ability, but plays in selfish manner which hinders his ability to work as a team.

- Tenpei Matsuki (Voiced by: Ichirō Murakoshi)

A former Japan representative and Mexico Olympic Bronze Medalist, Matsuki is the high school soccer coach who formerly was a goalkeeper. He retired from soccer after having received an injury after a fight with yakuza. He is rather sadistic and pushes his team to the limit so they can win.

- Yosuke Ohira (Voiced by: Shingo Kanemoto)

Position: Goalkeeper
A third-year, Ohira is a large build man, who identifies himself the "boss" of school. He loses a fight with Tamai and thus gains his respect.

- Hikaru Aota (Voiced by: Katsuji Mori)

Son of the PTA president and is generally wealthy. He participates in reckless behaviors until Tamai helps him turn around.

- Jiro Komano (Voiced by: Kaneta Kimotsuki)

Shinsei High School football staff. He is very analytical and wears glasses.

- Ryoko Asuka (Voiced by: Akiko Mori (Episodes 1–12. 25–28, 52), Hiroko Suzuki (Episodes 13–16))

A second-year, she is very stout and prideful. She is the manager of the team.

- Moriyama (Voiced by: Masahiko Murase)

Shinsei high school principal.

=== Rival teams ===
- Jun Misugi (Voiced by: Osamu Ichikawa)

Position: Offensive Midfielder
Captain of Asakaze high school soccer. Tamai regards him as a genius.

- Gojuro Yamagata (Voiced by: Takeshi Kuwabara)

Position: Forward
Captain of the Kyoio high school soccer. He is a rival of Tamai.

- Shunji Hayase (Voiced by: Shuichi Ikeda)

Asakaze high school soccer player.

- Takeshi Kamioka (Voiced by: Rokurō Naya)

The Fujie West high school soccer coach and the brother of Tsuyoshi. He is a former Japan national soccer team player.

- Tsuyoshi Kamioka (Voiced by: Keiichi Noda)

Position: Goalkeeper
Younger brother Takeshi Kamioka, Fujie West high school's soccer coach.

- Bob Stanley

Position: Forward
Soccer player of the American School.

=== Family ===
- Mamoru Aota (Voiced by: Masashi Amenomori)

Shinsei High School PTA president and father of Hikaru.

- Rinkichi Tamai (Voiced by: Tamio Ōki)

The adoptive father Shingo and a sushi chef.

- Kimie Tamai (Voiced by: Reiko Kouke)

Adoptive Mother of Shingo Tamai.

- Shin Nagata (Voiced by: Ichirō Nagai)

The real father of "Makoto Nagata", who is actually Shingo Tamai.

=== Anime television original characters ===
- Okawa (Voiced by: Shuusei Nakamura)
- Machida (Voiced by: Rokurō Naya)
- Hayato Taki (Voiced by: Ikuo Nishikawa (episodes 32–37), Takeo Tomoharu (episodes 38–52))
- Saizo Yashima (Voiced by: Akio Nojima)
- Sasuke Yashima (Voiced by: Akira Kamiya)
- Sugihara (Voiced by: Takeshi Aono)
- Narrator: Gorō Naya (episodes 1–18)

== Episodes ==
#	Episode Name	Japanese broadcast
1	Getting Together Through the [Soccer] Ball!「このボールの下に集まれ!」 No shita ni kono booru atsumare!	April 13, 1970
2	A Kick of Rebellion「反逆のキック」Hangyaku no kikku	April 20, 1970
3	The Wolf's Challenge「狼達の挑戦」 - Ookami-tachi no chosen	April 27, 1970
4	Blood Battle「血戦」Kessen	May 4, 1970
5	The Ball That Calls a Storm「嵐を呼ぶボール」Arashi o yobu booru	May 11, 1970
6	I Am the Sun「俺が,太陽だ」Ore ga, taiyōda	May 18, 1970
7	Deathblow Drop Kick「必殺のドロップキック」Hissatsu no Doroppu kikku	May 25, 1970
8	Showdown at Sunset「落日の対決」Rakujitsu no taiketsu	June 1, 1970
9	Which Goal Is Mine?「俺のゴールはどっちだ」Gooru wa ore no docchi?	June 8, 1970
10	The Appearance of Rival Jun Misugi「ライバル美杉純登場」Raibaru Misugi Jun toojoo	June 15, 1970
11	Held-Back Tears「涙のレフトバック」Namida no refuto Bakku	June 22, 1970
12	I Will Shoot!「俺がシュートする!」Shuto hours ga suru!	June 29, 1970
13	Training for the Goal「ゴールへの特訓」Gooru e no Tokkun	July 6, 1970
14	Don't Shoot!「シュートをするな!」Shuto or suru na!	July 13, 1970
15	Who is the Hero?「ヒーローは誰れだ!」Hīrō wa darereda!!	July 20, 1970
16	Forbidden Submarine Shoot「禁じられたサブマリンシュート」Kinji rare ta sabumarin shuuto	July 27, 1970
17	Fiery Rocket Shoot「火を吐くロケットシュート」 - Hi o haku roketto shuuuto	August 3, 1970
18	Burning Magical Ball「燃える魔球」Moeru makyū	August 10, 1970
19	A Rival in Pain「傷ついたライバル」Kizutsuita raibaru	August 17, 1970
20	The Ball That Flies in the Sky「大空へ飛ぶサブマリン」Oozora and tobu sabumarin	August 24, 1970
21	The Disappearance of Jun Misugi「消えた美杉純」Kie ta Misugi Jun	August 31, 1970
22	Resurrecting the Submarine「よみがえるサブマリン」Yomigaeru sabumarin	September 7, 1970
23	Fork Shoot Yamagata Gōjūrō「フォークシュート山形豪十郎」Fooku Shuuto Yamagata Gojūroo	September 14, 1970
24	Look Out! My Submarine Shoot「見てろ!俺のサブマリン·シュート」Mite ro! Ore no sabumarin shuuto	September 21, 1970
25	Defeat! Jun Misugi「打倒!美杉纯」Datoo! Misugi Jun	September 28, 1970
26	Roaring Submarine Shoot!「うなれ!サブマリン·シュート Unare! sabumarin shuuto	October 5, 1970
27	Illusionary Goalkeeper Tsuyoshi Kamioka「幻のゴールキーパー上岡剛」Maboroshi no goorukiipaa Kamioka Tsuyoshi	October 12, 1970
28	A Blinding Diving Catch「目かくしのダイビングキャッチ」Me kakushi no daibingu kyacchi	October 19, 1970
29	Iron-wall Goal「鉄壁のゴール」Teppeki no gooru	October 26, 1970
30	Demon Brothers of Soccer「サッカーの鬼兄弟」Sakkaa no oni kyoodai	November 2, 1970
31	Airborne Twist Kick「空中回転ひねりキック」Kuchu kaiten hineri kikku	November 9, 1970
32	Karate Hayato Taki「空手の滝隼人」Karate no Taki Hayato	November 16, 1970
33	Wind-Crossed Attack「風きる十字攻撃」Kaze kiru juji koogeki	November 23, 1970
34	Father's Secret「父の秘密」Chichi no himitsu	November 30, 1970
35	Demon Brothers the Kamiokas!「鬼兄弟上岡来る!」Kyoodai Kamioka kuru oni	December 7, 1970
36	Vengeful Tornado Shoot「執念の竜巻シュート」Shunen no Tatsumaki Shuto	December 14, 1970
37	Demon Kamioka's 10 Consecutive Wins「鬼の上岡十連勝!」Oni no Kamioka ju renshoo!	December 21, 1970
38	The Challenge of the Two Evil Brothers「鬼兄弟からの挑戦状」Oni kyoodai kara no chosen joo	December 28, 1970
39	Congratulatory Shot「シュートでおめでとう」Shuto de omedetoo	January 4, 1971
40	The Panther of Brazil「ブラジルの黒豹」Burajiru no kuro hyoo	January 11, 1971
41	Beret: The Shooter of the World!「世界の得点王ベレー来る!」 - Sekai no tokuten-ō berē kuru!	January 18, 1971
42	Panther's Murderous Shot 黒豹の殺人シュート」Kuro hyoo no satsujin Shuuto	January 25, 1971
43	The Golden Right Foot「黄金の右足」Ogon no migiashi	February 1, 1971
44	Demon Coach Yaeshima「鬼コーチ八重島」Oni koochi Yaeshima	February 8, 1971
45	Barking Panther「ほえるブラックジャガー」Hoeru Burakku jagaa	February 15, 1971
46	Rising Right Foot「よみがえる右足」Yomigaeru migiashi	February 22, 1971
47	Killers of the Jungle「ジャングルの殺し屋たち」Janguru no Koroshi ya Tachi	March 1, 1971
48	The Mother of Ken Santos「ケン·サントスの母」Ken Santosu no haha	March 8, 1971
49	Soccer's Twin Guys「ふたごのサッカー野郎」Futago no sakkaa yaroo	March 15, 1971
50	Burn! The Sun's Eleven「もえろ!太陽イレブン」Moero! Taiyoo irebun	March 22, 1971
51	Roar! Hayabusa Shoot「うなれ!はやぶさシュート」 - Unare! Hayabusa Shuuto	March 29, 1971
52	Going Out Into the World「世界にいどむ一球」 - Sekai ni idomu Ikkyū	April 5, 1971
