= Tiger Mask =

1968 sports manga and its adaptations

- Cover of the 2001 re-release of the first manga volume.

タイガーマスク (Taigā Masuku)
- Genre: Sports (Professional wrestling)
- Manga
- Written by: Ikki Kajiwara
- Illustrated by: Naoki Tsuji
- Published by: Kodansha
- Magazine: Bokura Magazine
- Original run: 1968 – 1971
- Volumes: 14
- Anime television series
- Directed by: Takeshi Tamiya
- Written by: Masaki Tsuji; Tadashi Kondo; Toyohiro Ando
- Music by: Shunsuke Kikuchi
- Studio: Toei Animation
- Original network: YTV
- Original run: October 2, 1969 – September 30, 1971
- Episodes: 105
- Anime film
- Directed by: Takeshi Tamiya
- Studio: Toei Animation
- Released: March 17, 1970
- Runtime: 47 minutes
- Anime film

Tiger Mask: Fuku Men League Sen
- Directed by: Takeshi Tamiya
- Studio: Toei Animation
- Released: July 19, 1970
- Runtime: 53 minutes
- Anime television series

Tiger Mask II
- Directed by: Kozo Morishita
- Written by: Haruya Yamazaki
- Music by: Shunsuke Kikuchi
- Studio: Toei Animation
- Original network: ANN (TV Asahi)
- Original run: April 20, 1981 – January 18, 1982
- Episodes: 33
- Live-action film
- Directed by: Ken Ochiai
- Produced by: Toshiaki Nakazawa; Hidehiro Ito; Yoshihiro Yamamoto
- Written by: Hidehiro Ito; Itaru Era; Ken Ochiai; Michael Welles Schock
- Music by: Koji Endo
- Studio: Shochiku
- Released: November 9, 2013
- Runtime: 90 minutes
- Anime television series
- Tiger Mask W
- icon

Tiger Mask (Japanese: タイガーマスク, Hepburn: Taigā Masuku) is a Japanese manga series written by Ikki Kajiwara and illustrated by Naoki Tsuji. The series was first published in Kodansha's Bokura Magazine from 1968 to 1970 and was later published in Weekly Shōnen Magazine from 1970 to 1971. It was later adapted into an anime series by Toei Animation which first aired on Yomiuri Television on October 2, 1969, and ended its run on September 30, 1971, airing 105 episodes. In real life, the name has been used by a succession of Japanese professional wrestling characters as a gimmick. The Tiger Mask persona is instantly recognizable by its trademark mask, designed to look like a tiger's head, as well as the combination of high flying attacks and martial arts in the ring.

The original anime saw a limited release overseas such as in Spain as El Hombre Tigre and aired in Italy as L 'uomo Tigre. The show was never released in English.

== Plot ==
Tiger Mask (real name Naoto Date) was a feared heel wrestler in America with a reputation of being extremely vicious in the ring. However, he became a face after returning to Japan when a young boy said that he wanted to grow up to be a villain like Tiger Mask. The boy was from the same orphanage that Tiger Mask grew up in. Since he did not want the boy to idolize a villain, Tiger was inspired to become a hero wrestler.

The main antagonist is the Tiger's Den, a shadowy organization that trains young people to be villainous wrestlers on the condition that they give half of their earnings to the organization. Tiger Mask was once a member of the Tiger's Den under the name "Yellow Devil", but no longer wanted anything to do with them, instead donating his money to the orphanage. The leader of Tiger's Den responds by sending numerous assassins, including other professional wrestlers.

In Tiger Mask II (タイガーマスク二世, Taigā Masuku Ni-sei), a new opponent called "Outer Space Mask" bullies his way into the ring without representing any wrestling federation. Tatsuo Aku, once an orphan child from the "house of the children", was a fan of Naoto, who has died. He would put on his old hero's mask to become the new Tiger Mask.

== Characters ==
=== Tiger Mask and his comrades ===
Naoto Date (伊達 直人, Date Naoto) / Tiger Mask (タイガーマスク, Taigā Masuku)

- Voiced by: Kei Tomiyama, Katsuji Mori (ep. 32~39)

Kentaro Takaoka (高岡 拳太郎, Takaoka Kentarō) / Yellow Devil (イエロー・デビル, Ierō Debiru)

- Voiced by: Ryouichi Tanaka

Daigo Daimon (大門 大吾, Daimon Daigo) / Mister Fudo (ミスター不動, Misutā Fudo)

- Voiced by: Kazuya Tatekabe

Toranosuke Arashi (嵐 虎之介, Arashi Toranosuke)

- Voiced by: Yonehiko Kitagawa

The Great Zebra (ザ・グレイト・ゼブラ, Za Gureito Zebura)

- Voiced by: Shingo Kanemoto

=== Chibikko House ===
Akira Wakatsuki (若月晃, Wakatsuki Akira)

- Voiced by: Kenji Nakagawa

Ruriko Wakatsuki (若月 ルリ子, Wakatsuki Ruriko)

- Voiced by: Nana Yamaguchi (ep. 1~77), Michiko Nomura (ep. 78~105)

Kenta (健太)

- Voiced by: Masako Nozawa

Yoshio Sasaki (佐々木芳夫, Sasaki Yoshio)

- Voiced by: Masako Taki (ep. 1~55), Noriko Watanabe (ep. 56~105)

Chappy (チャッピー, Chappī)

- Voiced by: Sachiko Chijimatsu

Gaboten (ガボテン)

- Voiced by: Keiko Yamamoto

Mikuro (ミクロ)

- Voiced by: Kazuko Sugiyama

Yoko Takaoka (高岡洋子, Takaoka Yōko)

- Voiced by: Reiko Katsura

=== Tiger's Den ===
Mister X (ミスターX, Misutā X)

- Voiced by: Hidekatsu Shibata

Mister X is the main antagonist of the series.

Boss (ボス, Bosu) / Miracle 3 (ミラクル3, Mirakuru 3) / Tiger the Great (タイガー・ザ・グレイト, Taigā za Gureito)

- Voiced by: Taimei Suzuki

The Boss is the leader of the Tiger's Den. He makes his first appearance disguised as the unbelievably strong fighter Miracle 3, the only fighter with total supremacy in the three fundamental abilities: strength, speed and illegal moves. Miracle 3 wins every fight in a clear and correct way, studying Tiger Mask's style against some fighters chosen by him. When he finally fights with Tiger Mask, he reassumes his old name: Tiger the Great.

Big Tiger (ビッグ・タイガー, Biggu Taigā)

- Voiced by: Yonehiko Kitagawa

Black Tiger (ブラック・タイガー, Burakku Taigā)

- Voiced by: Kenji Nakagawa

King Tiger (キング・タイガー, Kingu Taigā)

- Voiced by: Masao Nakasone

The third master of the Tiger's Den. He was considered the strongest fighter ever. He was forced to retire because nobody was capable to fight him on an even basis. Adding to his considerable technique, King Tiger is the absolute master of illegal moves. His fight with Tiger Mask rapidly escalates to a real bloodbath.

=== Other characters ===
TV announcer

- Voiced by: Keiichi Noda

Ring announcer and narrator.

=== Tiger Mask II characters ===
Name	Voiced by
Tatsuo Aku / Tiger Mask	Hideyuki Hori
Midori Ariyoshi	Chiyoko Kawashima
Antonio Inoki	Banjo Ginga
Ahman Hassan	Chikao Otsuka
Junko Tachibana	Mami Koyama
Kazuya Tachibana	Satomi Majima
Hinode Sports Desk	Chikao Otsuka
Ishimatsu	Kaneto Shiozawa
Saiga	Hideyuki Tanaka
Mina Saiga	Chisato Nakajima
Ichiro Furutachi	Kōji Yada

== Publication history ==
The manga was originally created for the Bokura Magazine in 1968 by Ikki Kajiwara and Naoki Tsuji. The manga would be reprinted by Kodansha comics, and made available in Hong Kong. Further versions include Sankei Comics and the Kodansha KC Special. The anime would be televised nationally in Japan, while two movies would be constructed from reusing footage of the series. Most of the environment and characters were fictional, but real-life pro wrestlers like Antonio Inoki, Giant Baba, Michiaki Yoshimura, Kintarō Ōki and Seiji Sakaguchi were included in the manga and anime as well.

On March 3, 2016, New Japan Pro-Wrestling announced the revival of the Tiger Mask anime series. The series, entitled Tiger Mask W, premiered on TV Asahi in October 2016. It is also currently streaming on Crunchyroll, marking it as the first Tiger Mask anime available to American viewers. This new series is the exclusive sequel of the anime version and completely ignores Tiger Mask II, which confirms Naoto Date's death like in the manga.

== Adaptations ==
=== Films ===
The movies were titled as such in English when exported outside Japan. They are not actual translations.

Japanese Name	English Name	Release date	Type
タイガーマスク	Tiger Mask	1970	movie
タイガーマスク ふく面リーグ戦	Tiger Mask: War Against the League of Masked Wrestlers	July 19, 1970	movie
タイガーマスク	Tiger Mask	November 9, 2013	movie

In November 2023, a live-action film adaptation for the international market was announced by Italy's Fabula Pictures, Brandon Box, and Kodansha.

=== Video games ===
While the Tiger Mask character has appeared in a number of wrestling video games, such as Fire Pro Wrestling D, Toukon Retsuden 3, Sunday vs Magazine: Shūketsu! Chōjō Daikessen and Virtual Pro Wrestling 64, the games are not directly based on the story of the manga or anime.

== Cultural influences ==
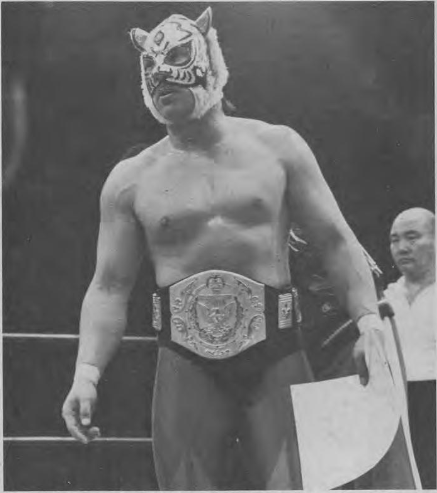
Satoru Sayama as Tiger Mask in 1982

In the early 1980s, the bookers in the New Japan Pro-Wrestling promotion licensed the character and created a real-life Tiger Mask, originally portrayed by Satoru Sayama, to help boost their junior heavyweight division.

In 2010 and 2011, several people in Japan donated to children's homes and other social welfare centers by using the name "Naoto Date" as an alias.

In 2012, an Israeli artist named Omer Rabinovitz recorded a fictional song over the series opening sequence renaming it 'Namer HaKesef' ("The Silver/Money Tiger"), reaching over 400 thousand views on YouTube and becoming a cult phenomenon in Israel. Telling the story of businessman Esteban Jiménez, hit erroneously by a laser beam from the star Zorigon-5, changing his molecular structure and his destiny forever - businessman in the day, Tiger in the night, while his new rivals have learned to call him by the name "Money Tiger".

As a result of the song, fictional episodes were created independently by three creators, Bar Weizman, Dan Weizman, and Dor Levin, and a Minecraft skin was also created.

In Ben 10: Alien Force, Rath is a tiger-like alien who uses wrestling moves on his foes. Similarly, both characters were also vicious at first but then turned good after meeting a small child.

=== In video games ===
In the Tekken video game series, a character named King shares similarities with Tiger Mask, except his mask is that of a jaguar rather than a tiger.

Street Fighter II, in its early concept design stages, had a very similar homage to Tiger Mask in its character roster.

In the video game series Hotline Miami, there is a tiger mask that when equipped, allows you throw devastating punches when unarmed. This may be a reference to Tiger Mask.

In the Yo-Kai Watch game series, a yokai named Machonyan wears a tiger mask.

Pokémon Sun and Moon introduced Incineroar, the "Heel Pokémon", displaying elements of both a tiger and a wrestler. It is also a playable character in Super Smash Bros. Ultimate.
