= Mitsuyoshi Sonoda =

Japanese manga artist

Mitsuyoshi Sonoda (園田 光慶, Sonoda Mitsuyoshi, December 7, 1940 – July 1997) was a Japanese manga artist. During the time in which manga was often distributed through lending libraries, Sonoda used the pen name Hidekazu Arikawa (ありかわ 栄一, Arikawa Hidekazu).

His best known works are Akatasuki Sentōtai, Sangokushi and Akakichi no Eleven. Akatasuki Sentōtai ran afoul of Japanese sentiment in the 1960s against military manga and has since fallen out of circulation.

== Biography ==
Sonoda was born in Osaka in 1940.

== Works ==
- Iron Muscle (アイアン・マッスル)
- Akatasuki Sentōtai (あかつき戦闘隊) written by Shunsuke Sagara
- Akaki Chi no Eleven (赤き血のイレブン) written by Ikki Kajiwara
- Target (ターゲット)
- Fuun Tenka Tori (風雲天下盗り) written by Sentarō Kubota and Jūzō Yamasaki
- Sengoku Saru Mawashi Nobunaga・Hidekichi to Hachisuka Koroku (戦国猿廻し 信長・秀吉と蜂須賀小六)
- Sangokushi (三国志)
