= Tetsuya Chiba =

Japanese manga artist (1939–2026)

- ちばてつや
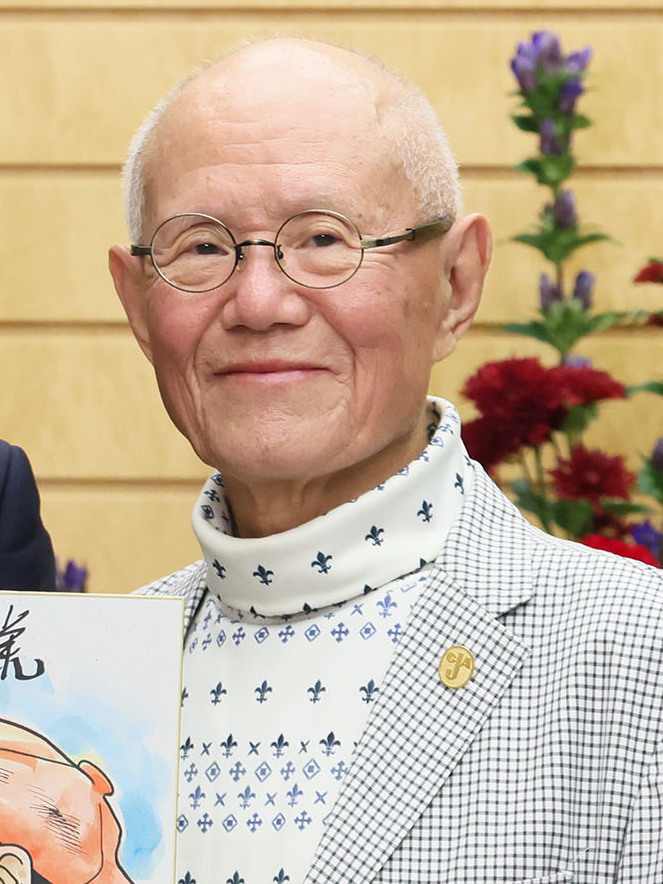
- Chiba in November 2023
- Born: January 11, 1939; Tsukiji, Tokyo, Japan
- Died: October 22, 2026 (aged 87); Tokyo, Japan
- Known for: Manga
- Notable work: Ashita no Joe; Notari Matsutarō
- Relatives: Akio Chiba (brother)
- Awards: Kodansha Children's Comic Award (1962); Kodansha Culture Award (1976); Japan Cartoonists Association Award (1976); Shogakukan Manga Award (1978); MEXT Award (2001); Medal with Purple Ribbon (2002); Order of Culture (2024)

Tetsuya Chiba (Japanese: 千葉 徹彌(ちばてつや), Hepburn: Chiba Tetsuya; January 11, 1939 – October 22, 2026) was a Japanese manga artist. He is considered a major figure in the history of manga, and many of his early titles are still in print due to continued popularity.

Chiba is most famous for his sports stories, having been described as "the biggest contributor to the rise of sports manga", in particular for works such as Ashita no Joe, his best known work, and Notari Matsutarō.

== Background ==
Chiba was born on January 11, 1939, in Tokyo, Japan. He lived most of his early childhood in China during World War II. His father was working in a paper factory when they lived in China.

At the end of the war, Chiba's family lived in the attic of a work-acquaintance of his father until they could find a way to get back to Japan. Tetsuya has three brothers, Ken, Akio, and Shigeyuki. Akio and Shigeyuki (using the pen name Taro Nami) are also manga artists, though Shigeyuki's work is almost completely unknown outside Japan, despite him writing popular sports manga.

In 1950, while in elementary school, Tetsuya created a manga club with some friends. He created his first official manga, Fukushu no Semushi, (The Hunchback Avenger), in 1956. In 1958, he made his professional debut in Shōjo Book with Butōkai no Shōjo.

He received several awards for his manga, including the Kodansha Children's Manga Award for 1, 2, 3, & 4, 5, 6, Kodansha Culture Award for Ore wa Teppei, and both the Japanese Cartoonist Association Award and Shogakukan Manga Award in 1977 for Notari Matsutaro. In 2001 he was awarded the Award from Ministry of Education, Culture, Sports, Science and Technology (MEXT) for his work on youth sports manga. In 2002, he was awarded the Purple Ribbon medal by the Japanese government. In July 2012 he was appointed the chairman of the Japan Cartoonists Association after Takashi Yanase stepped down due to age and health reasons. In Fall 2012 he was awarded the Order of the Rising Sun, Gold Rays with Rosette, by the Japanese government.

Chiba's series Harris no Kaze, Ashita no Joe, Akane-chan, Ore wa Teppei, Ashita Tenki ni Naare and Notari Masutaro have all received anime adaptations. Yuki no Taiyou received a short pilot film in 1972, which was Hayao Miyazaki's solo directorial debut, and an animated film for Kaze no Yo ni premiered in June 2016.

In 2015, he left retirement in order to work on the series Hinemosu no Tari Nikki for Big Comic magazine. The manga is an autobiographical manga about his childhood, experiences from the war and his career as a manga artist. Naoki Urasawa's TV show Urasawa Naoki no Manben featured Chiba's drawing process on the series in 2020.

He lived in Nerima, Tokyo. In January 2022, he successfully underwent heart surgery at the age of 82 and then continued working on his current series.

In 2022, he became the first manga artist ever to be nominated as a member to the Japan Art Academy (alongside Yoshiharu Tsuge).

In 2024, he was awarded the Order of Culture, becoming the first manga artist to receive this honor.

Chiba died at a hospital in Tokyo, on October 22, 2026, due to a myelodysplastic syndrome. He was 87. His death was announced five days later.

== Selected works ==
- Chikai no Makyū (ちかいの魔球; Weekly Shōnen Magazine, Kodansha, January 1961 – December 1962, created by Kazuya Fukumoto)
- 1•2•3 to 4•5•Roku (1・2・3と4・5・ロク; Shōjo Club, Kodansha, January – December 1962)
- Shidenkai no Taka (紫電改のタカ; Weekly Shōnen Magazine, July 1963 – January 1965)
- Harris no Kaze (ハリスの旋風; Weekly Shōnen Magazine, April 1965 – November 1967)
- Misokkasu (みそっかす; Shōjo Friend, Kodansha, August 1966 – August 1967)
- Ashita no Joe (あしたのジョー; Weekly Shōnen Magazine, January 1968 – June 1973, written by Asao Takamori)
- Kaze no Yō ni (風のように; Shojo Friend, 1969)
- Ore wa Teppei (おれは鉄兵; Weekly Shōnen Magazine, August 1973 – April 1980)
- Notari Matsutarō (のたり松太郎; Big Comic, Shogakukan, August 1973 – June 1993 and October 1995 – May 1998)
- Ashita Tenki ni Naare (あした天気になあれ; Weekly Shōnen Magazine, January 1981 – May 1991)
- Otokotachi (男たち; Comic Morning, Kodansha, September 1982 – July 1983)
- Shōnen yo Raketto o Idake (少年よラケットを抱け; Weekly Shōnen Magazine, May 1992 – June 1994)
- Hinemosu Notari Nikki (ひねもすのたり日記; Big Comic, December 2015 – September 2026)
