= Ikki Kajiwara =

Japanese author and manga writer

Ikki Kajiwara 梶原 一騎
- Kajiwara in a 1973 issue of Weekly Shonen Magazine
- Born: Asaki Takamori; September 4, 1936 Kitakyushu, Fukuoka, Japan
- Died: January 21, 1987 (aged 50) Tokyo, Japan
- Areas: Author, manga writer, film producer
- Pseudonym: Asao Takamori
- Notable works: Ashita no Joe; Star of the Giants; Karate Baka Ichidai; Tiger Mask
- Spouses: Atsuko Takamori (div. 1973) (m. 1985); Pai Bing-bing (m. 1978; div. 1981)
- Children: Three sons and three daughters, including Pai Hsiao-yen

Asaki Takamori (高森 朝樹, Takamori Asaki; September 4, 1936 – January 21, 1987), known by the pen names Ikki Kajiwara (梶原 一騎, Kajiwara Ikki) and Asao Takamori (高森 朝雄, Takamori Asao), was a Japanese author, manga writer, and film producer. He is known for the work about sports and martial arts, with images of heroic young men with the occasional fine details as he moves from one topic to another. Tiger Mask and Star of the Giants have been cited as his life's work.

== Biography ==
The son of an illustrator and editor, Takamori was a notorious juvenile delinquent with an interest in fighting. After World War II, his family moved to Tokyo, where he jumped schools until landing a job as a novelist at 17. He adopted the pen names Ikki Kajiwara and Asao Takamori, since he was writing for rival magazines at the time.

He was married to Atsuko Takamori (March 5, 1945 – April 6, 2015) two times; they had three sons and two daughters together. They were divorced from 1973 to 1985. In 1978, while they were divorced, he married Taiwanese singer Pai Bing-bing and in 1980 fathered a daughter, Pai Hsiao-yen, who was murdered in 1997. Their marriage was dissolved the next year after he engaged in an extramarital affair and committed domestic violence. Pai Bing-bing had to return to Taiwan and raised Hsiao-yen as a single mother.

On May 25, 1983, Kajiwara was arrested for injuring Toshikazu Ishima, deputy director of the Monthly Shonen Magazine. He was released on bail after two months in detention. On March 14, 1985, Kajiwara was sentenced to two years in prison with a three-year reprieve.

On January 21, 1987, Kajiwara died at the age of 50.

== Works ==
=== Manga ===
All listings are as Ikki Kajiwara unless otherwise specified.

- Ai to Makoto (art: Takumi Nagayasu)
- Asahi no Koibito (as Asao Takamori, art: Eiji Kazama)
- Ashita no Joe (as Asao Takamori, art: Tetsuya Chiba)
- Akaki Chi no Eleven (art: Mitsuyoshi Sonoda)
- Champion Futoshi (art: Tatsuo Yoshida)
- Jūdō Icchokusen (art: Shinji Nagashima)
- Karate Master (art: Jirō Tsunoda and Jōya Kagemaru)
- Karate Jigokuhen (art: Ken Nakajō)
- Kick no Oni (art: Ken Nakajō)
- Kurenai no Chōsensha (as Asao Takamori, art: Ken Nakajō)
- Star of the Giants (art: Noboru Kawasaki)
- Ningen Kyōki (art: Yasuo Nakano)
- Otoko Michi (art: Takao Yaguchi)
- Otoko no Jōken (art: Noboru Kawasaki)
- Otoko no Seiza (art: Kunichika Harada)
- Pro Wrestling Superstar Retsuden (art: Kunichika Harada)
- Samurai Giants (art: Kō Inoue)
- Shikakui Jungle (as Asao Takamori, art: Ken Nakajō)
- Shin Karate Jigokuhen (art: Ken Nakajō)
- Tiger Mask (art: Naoki Tsuji)
- Tiger Mask 2nd (art: Junichi Miyata)
- Yuuyake Banchō (art: Toshio Shōji)

=== Movies ===
- Ai no Nagisa (1976)
- Chijou Saikyou no Karate (1976): documentary
- Chijou Saikyou no Karate Part 2 (1976): documentary
- Ame no Meguri Ai (1977)
- Hishuu Monogatari (1977) (director: Seijun Suzuki, plot: Atsushi Yamatoya)
- Seiki no Shinken Shoubu Shijou Saikyou no Karate Kessyuu-hen (1977): documentary
- Mach'78 (1978)
- Karate Dai Sensou (1978)
- Kakutougi Sekai Ichi Shikakui Jungle (1978): documentary
- Gekitotsu! Kakutougi Shikakui Jungle (1979): documentary
- Saikyou Saigo no Karate (1980): documentary
- Ashita no Joe (1980)
- Kakutougi Olympic (1980): documentary
- Little Champion (1981)
- Ashita no Joe 2 (1981)
- Star of the Giants (1982)
- Modorigawa (1983) (director: Tatsumi Kumashiro, plot: Haruhiko Arai, original story: Mikihiko Renjō「Modorigawa Shinjuu」)
