= Megalobox =

Anime television series and its manga

- Key visual, featuring the main character Joe/Junk Dog

メガロボクス (Megarobokusu)
- Genre: Sports
- Manga

Megalobox - Shukumei no Sōken
- Published by: Kodansha
- Magazine: Shōnen Magazine Edge
- Original run: February 17, 2018 – August 17, 2018
- Volumes: 2
- Anime television series
- Directed by: Yō Moriyama
- Written by: Katsuhiko Manabe; Kensaku Kojima
- Music by: Mabanua
- Studio: TMS Entertainment; 3xCube
- Licensed by: AUS: Madman Entertainment; BI: Anime Limited; NA: Viz Media; SA/SEA: Medialink
- Original network: JNN (TBS, BS-TBS)
- English network: US: Adult Swim (Toonami)
- Original run: April 6, 2018 – June 29, 2018
- Episodes: 13
- Anime television series

Megalobox 2: Nomad
- Directed by: Yō Moriyama
- Written by: Katsuhiko Manabe; Kensaku Kojima
- Music by: Mabanua
- Studio: TMS Entertainment
- Licensed by: Crunchyroll: SA/SEA: Medialink
- Original network: Tokyo MX, BS11
- Original run: April 4, 2021 – June 27, 2021
- Episodes: 13
- See also
- Ashita no Joe
- icon

Megalobox (Japanese: メガロボクス, Hepburn: Megarobokusu) is a Japanese anime television series. The series is produced and animated by TMS Entertainment and its subsidiary 3xCube and directed by Yō Moriyama, his first directorial work. Megalobox was created in commemoration of the 50th anniversary of the boxing manga Ashita no Joe. Set in late 21st century Japan where boxers wear powered exoskeletons to fight, the narrative focuses on an underground fighter only known by his ring name Junk Dog, who decides to enter into a boxing competition called Megalonia, to defeat the champion, Yūri.

The series was broadcast in Japan from April 6 to June 29, 2018, and was simulcast on Crunchyroll. The series was licensed by Viz Media for an English release and began airing on Adult Swim's Toonami programming block in the United States in December 2018. A second season, titled Megalobox 2: Nomad, aired from April 4 to June 27, 2021.

== Synopsis ==
=== Setting ===
Megalobox takes place in a late 21st-century Japan where people with citizenship live in a metropolis called the Administrative Area, while people without citizenship live in a massive slum known as the Restricted Area, located on the outskirts of the Administrative Area. Megaloboxing is a popular sport in the Megalobox universe similar to boxing, except the boxers fight while wearing powered exoskeletons called Gears, which makes their attacks much more lethal.

=== Plot ===
The story follows a man (only known by his ring name Junk Dog) who fights fixed matches in fight clubs located in the Restricted Area. One evening, while riding his motorcycle in the Administrative Area, he almost crashes into Yukiko Shirato, the CEO of the company Shirato Group. Junk Dog picks a fight with her bodyguard Yūri who is also the Megaloboxing Champion. Yukiko stops the fight but Yūri seeks out Junk Dog and meets him in a fight club where he easily beats the less-experienced fighter and tells him to fight him again in the Megaloboxing tournament Megalonia, which Junk Dog would need a place at the top of the official Megalobox rankings to qualify for, as well as a proper citizenship ID to enter the rankings in the first place. After Junk Dog's coach Gansaku Nanbu persuades the mob boss Fujimaki to forge Junk Dog an ID under the name Joe, the two are given 3 months to achieve their goal of working their way to the top of the Megalobox rankings in order to have a chance of fighting in Megalonia.

== Characters ==
Joe (ジョー, Jō) / Junk Dog (ジャンクドッグ, Janku Doggu)
Voiced by: Yoshimasa Hosoya (Japanese); Kaiji Tang (English)
Junk Dog is an underground Megaloboxer from the outskirts of town whose real name is unknown. He is forced to throw fights to earn money for his crooked manager. He initially fights with old Gear that is constantly in need of repair. He takes on the name "Joe" when he has a Citizen ID forged in order to enter the Megalonia tournament. He later takes on the ring name "Gearless" Joe (ギアレスジョー, Giaresu Jō) as part of a gimmick to rise in the rankings quickly, fighting without Gear against Gear-equipped opponents.
In the second season he takes on the moniker "Nomad" (ノマド, Nomado), drifting to different underground fighting rings with simple Gear and fighting opponents to fund his painkiller addiction. It is mentioned in the background that sometime after vacating his Megalonia belt, he lost an exhibition match to Yuri's disciple and the next champion, Edison Liu, and has not been seen in a pro Megaloboxing match since. After meeting Chief, Joe decides to be his cornerman while Chief and Marla help him fight his painkiller addiction. He later returns to his hometown to make amends to his former friends, who had almost seven years prior cast him out for abandoning them as Nanbu died to fight in a boxing match.
Gansaku Nanbu (南部贋作, Nanbu Gansaku)
Voiced by: Shirō Saitō (Japanese); Jason Marnocha (English)
Nanbu is Junk Dog's manager, coach and a gambler with a drinking problem who keeps making him throw fights, even though deep down he believes in Junk Dog's abilities.
Between the first and second seasons, Nanbu dies of cancer. Sachio and the other children the two befriended hold resentment towards Joe for "abandoning" Nanbu as he was dying.
Yuri (勇利, Yūri)
Voiced by: Hiroki Yasumoto (Japanese); Lex Lang (English)
Yuri is Yukiko's bodyguard and the Megaloboxing champion. He seeks out Junk Dog after the latter insults his owner, meeting him in the underground ring he easily defeats him before telling him to work his way up in Megalonia if he wants to fight him again. Yuri is equipped with a unique prototype "integrated" Gear, which is surgically grafted directly to his arms.
In the second season, Yuri has become Edison Liu's boxing coach.
Sachio (サチオ, Sachio)
Voiced by: Michiyo Murase (Japanese); Erica Mendez, Clifford Chapin (Older; Season 2) (English)
Sachio is a young orphan boy from the impoverished Restricted Area who is talented with using and fixing machinery, which he and his friends often use to steal goods that they exchange for "Red Candy", a type of drug.
In the second season, Sachio, now a teenager, has become an underground Megaloboxer. He is noted to not have the resolve or natural talent for Megaloboxing, often badly losing matches, and holds Joe in deep contempt for his actions as Nanbu was dying.
Yukiko Shirato (白都ゆき子, Shirato Yukiko)
Voiced by: Nanako Mori (Japanese); Erika Harlacher (English)
Yukiko Shirato is the head of the Shirato Group who oversees the Megalonia tournament.
Fujimaki (藤巻, Fujimaki)
Voiced by: Hiroyuki Kinoshita (Japanese); Jamieson Price (English)
Fujimaki is a mob boss who sets up fixed fights for Junk Dog and Nanbu. He assists the duo in acquiring a forged Citizen ID so they can enter Megalonia and pay him back with the prize money after Junk Dog refuses to throw a fight.
Tatsumi Leonard Aragaki (タツミ・レナード・アラガキ, Tatsumi Renādo Aragaki)
Voiced by: Makoto Tamura (Japanese); Greg Chun (English)
Aragaki is Nanbu's former student. He was called up for military service a few years before the start of the story. During his time as a soldier he was directly hit by an explosion which cost him his legs and burned half his face off. When he returned home he started to suffer from PTSD which led him to attempt suicide and he also felt abandoned by Nanbu after finding that he had closed down his gym when he thought Aragaki had died. He makes his return to Megaloboxing 3 years before the start of the story and fights his way up to rank 17, when he hears that Nanbu has a new popular Megaloboxer named Joe he vows to destroy him so that Nanbu can feel his pain, but he also wants to earn money from sponsors so that he can repay everyone from the veteran's association for giving him his life back.
Miyagi (ミヤギ, Miyagi)
Voiced by: Yōhei Tadano (Japanese); Jake Eberle (English)
Mikio Shirato (白都樹生, Shirato Mikio)
Voiced by: Tatsuhisa Suzuki (Japanese); Robbie Daymond (English)
Mikio Shirato is Yukiko's older brother and the developer of Ace, a state-of-the-art Gear equipped with artificial intelligence that allows it to read and predict an opponent's moves, formulating the perfect counters and strategies. Mikio is arrogant, egotistical, and smug, believing "stray dogs" like Joe are not worthy of standing in the same ring as himself. Mikio was passed over for becoming the head of the Shirato Group in favor of his sister, a fact that causes him to hold a grudge against her.
In the second season, Mikio has become a professor at a local university.
Mac "The Hero" Rosario (マック, Makku)
Voiced by: Atsushi Miyauchi (Japanese); Christopher Wehkamp (English)
An Uruguay Megaloboxer sponsored by the technology company ROSCO. Formerly known for his explosive temper and aggressive moves in the ring, he retires from the sport after watching Joe and Yuri's bout at Megalonia. He later joins the police force and is seriously injured during a shootout, causing full-body paralysis. He is eventually approached by ROSCO CEO Ryugo Sakuma and agrees to have an experimental brain chip and integrated Gear system known as BES implanted, which allows him to move again and inspires him to rejoin the Megaloboxing world to showcase the BES system's capabilities. When he reaches excessive stress levels, the implanted brain chip causes him to enter "Mac Time," a mental state where he becomes hyper-focused. Coming down from Mac Time temporarily regresses his mind to a childlike state, with episodes getting worse over time.
Ryugo Sakuma (佐久間, Sakuma)
Voiced by: Chikahiro Kobayashi (Japanese); Tyler Walker (English)
The CEO of ROSCO, an eccentric young genius who developed BES.
Ignacio "Chief" Martinez (チーフ, Chīfu)
Voiced by: Miou Tanaka (Japanese); Chris Guerrero (English)
An undocumented Uruguayan Afro-Latino immigrant and the unofficial leader of his community who pretends to be a former ranked Megaloboxer to earn money in underground boxing matches. He was inspired by Joe to immigrate and plans to win Megalonia to help secure a more permanent home for his people.
Marla (マーラ, Mara)
Voiced by: Farahnaz Nikray (Japanese); Jalitza Delgado (English)
An undocumented Afro-Latino immigrant who runs an auto shop within the immigrant community, trying to make an honest living.
Mio (ミオ, Mio)
Voiced by: Yumi Hino (Japanese); Kevin Thelwell (English)
Marla's son who often commits petty crimes in hopes of appeasing his friends from outside the community.
Edison Liu (リュウ, Ryū)
Voiced by: Masaya Fukunishi (Japanese); Aaron Roberts (English)
The current Megaloboxing world champion and Yuri's star pupil. He defeated Joe in a title fight one year after the first Megalonia, which ended up being Joe's final match before he left town and became Nomad.
Santa (サンタ, Santa) , Oichio (おいちお, Oichio) and Bonjiri (ボンジリ, Bonjiri)
Santa Voiced by: Momoko Taneichi, Noriaki Kanze (Japanese); Morgan Berry, Jessie James Grelle (Older; Season 2) (English)
Oichio Voiced by: Ami Naitō, Mitsuho Kanbe (Japanese); Michelle Ruff (English)
Bonjiri Voiced by: Reimi, Fukushi Ochiai (Japanese); Laila Berzins, Dallas Reid (Older; Season 2) (English)
Sachio's orphaned street kid friends from the slums of the Restricted area, who have become huge fans of Joe and the Megaloboxing fights, including the ones held in Megalonia.

== Production ==
=== First season ===
The series was directed by Yō Moriyama who watched the second animated adaptation of manga Ashita no Joe during his youth. He was shocked by the quality of the series, not only in animation but themes of "stray" portrayed Joe Yabuki's character as well as his rivalry with Toru Rikishi. The series was created as a homage to Ashita no Joe that reached its 50th anniversary in 2018. Producer Minako Fujiyoshi from TMS was approached by Kodansha in 2013 about making the project. Originally, the story would take place in the same world as Ashita no Joe involving Jo's rival Rikishi but the idea was scrapped due to difficulties. As a result, the team decided to make a more original storyline. The series still retained the themes of Joe, "the never-give-up spirit of the character", and was going to be a parody instead. This idea was scrapped again and the team decided to make a more original narrative. The artwork was influenced by 1980s works like directors Katsuhiro Otomo and Yoshiaki Kawajiri. Moriyama felt the animation of Megalobox would "decrease" in the future. In early screenings of the series, Moriyama said, the first two episodes were developed to introduce the entire narrative and setting together while aiming to develop the future cast in later episodes. Voice actor Yoshimasa Hosoya who plays Gearless Joe was present in the screenings and said he was moved by the premiere due to how carefully both Joe and Yuri's characters were handled through the scene when the two meet on a rainy road. Hosoya felt that there was a character to Joe's character upon meeting Yuri due to the presence of the later.

Moriyama noted that an advantage he had while directing the series was that he could often draw due to his studies at a vocational school. During this time, Moriyama became interested in moving images rather than drawing manga and joined studio Madhouse to develop anime, inspired by their work Bobby's Neck. However, going from animator to director was challenging in his career but he felt confident about his drawing skills. Moriyama stated Gearless Joe and Yuri were loosely based Jo Yabuki and Rikishi respectively as he views that the rivalry of two boxers was the main event of Ashita no Joe which Megalobox adapted. Moriyama claims the series' message involves individualism and that people should enjoy the battles. However, Moriyama claims there was no main target audience for the anime. Fujiyoshi noted feedback to the first season was positive so he was glad to tell fans that a second season would be developed as a result. In choosing composers, the team found Mabanua's skills to be appealing. Hip hop was Moriyama's favorite type of music which inspired the soundtrack of the series which he also thought would fit the setting presented in the narrative.

The director's favorite work while working on anime was coming up with new ideas. Joe's fighting style was loosely inspired by Jake LaMotta and Naseem Hamed. In directing fighters, Moriyama claimed this proved to be challenging as a result of handling actions and movements. He says "Not all animators can draw accurate posing and there are limitations on time to pursue realistic movements. Due to those reasons, I was frequently in the thought process of "how should this be shot in order for the frame to look more effective". While drawing the storyboard, Moriyama often watched and reviewed boxing movies to be inspired. Several of the fights presented in the anime are inspired by the Premier Boxing Champions matches that were recommended by the scriptwriter Katsuhiko Manabe. Another theme besides individualism featured in the series is "for people to live"; Moriyama elaborates that there was a focus on three main characters despite Joe being the lead while also showing similarities with the cast from Ashita no Joe.

=== Second season ===
Producer Minako Fujiyoshi said he had no thoughts of giving Megalobox a second season during the finale of the first one due to a lack of importance at that time. During the script work, the staff had multiple discussions about the handling of Joe's atonement. There were many disagreements between Hoyama, the screenwriter team, and Fujiyoshi. He did not know if it was a difference between men and women or a difference in individual ideas, but he talked as many times as he wanted to make sure everybody was satisfied, and asked him to fix it as many times as he wanted, and all 13 scripts were completed. He was grateful to this team for making such a luxurious way. As for the highlights of the season's second half, the producer claimed there would be more nostalgic elements in the form of the returning characters who mostly look notably older than in the first season. He was glad these characters managed to mature.

Moriyama had similar thoughts about whether or not a second season should be made until being convinced by Fujiyoshi despite not getting too much positive feedback in Japan. The staff had mixed thoughts about how they should handle Joe as a depressed adult despite his younger days as Megalonia's champion as that was how the first season ended. Moriyama decided to touch on new themes to make Megalobox become a more independent work rather than staying as a tribute to Ashita no Joe. As a result, it incorporates more about the society and the world that they are interested in into the story, such as immigration issues. The staff highlighted Joe's depressing portrayal as he has not been able to move on with his life in contrast to Yuri and other returning characters. In order to support Joe's psychological state, the character of Chief was written. Across the narrative, Chief serves as a mentor to Joe in the first four episodes where he slowly recovers his fighting spirit. In the early stages, Moriyama drew the encounters between the characters Joe and Chief, and the things that react to each other. Joe's sin that torments him would be kept vague until the fifth episode where Joe is forced to fight himself. From there, more boxing matches were written. However, in contrast to the first season in which Joe's characterization was kept simple as he was obsessed with only defeating Yuri, the second season was written in a more complex way as the writers decided to make the impact of victory or defeat less important for the boxers.

In the making of the second season, Yoshimasa Hosoya was surprised by the announcement and felt ready for the new changes given to Joe's character. Other returning voice actors were curious about the narrative as their characters did not appear in early episodes. Hosoya noted the response to the first season was not popular only in Japan but also in Western regions as a result of the multiple letters the team received. When asked about the impression of the character of this work, which was set seven years after the previous work, Hosoya did not know that he was Joe at first when he saw the bearded and transformed Joe in the main visual of the second season. Hosoya was surprised by the improved animation which he felt was more fit of a movie rather than a television series. As a result, he believes Moriyama's direction skills were so good that he would support a live-action movie too. Joe's new name, Nomad, is meant to give a new impression of how the story changed.

== Media ==
=== Anime ===
The series was announced on October 12, 2017, through a video uploaded to TMS Entertainment's official YouTube channel. Yō Moriyama, who previously worked as a concept designer on Attack on Titan and Kabaneri of the Iron Fortress, serves as series director and concept designer. The opening theme is "Bite" by LEO Imai and the ending theme is "Kakatte Koi yo" (かかってこいよ, Come at Me) by NakamuraEmi with insert songs performed by rap artist COMA-CHI. The series was simulcasted on Crunchyroll; it aired for 13 episodes and the Japanese Blu-ray release contained a new short anime. During their Anime Expo 2018 panel, Viz Media announced that they have licensed the anime. Anime Limited announced that they had acquired the series for home video release in the United Kingdom and Ireland. Madman Entertainment acquired the series for distribution in Australia and New Zealand, and streamed the series on AnimeLab.

The series premiered on Adult Swim's Toonami programming block on December 8, 2018. (Note: Adult Swim lists the series as premiering on December 8, 2018 at 12:00 a.m. (24:00) EST/PST, which is effectively December 9.)

During Anime NYC on November 16, 2019, the staff announced that the series will receive a second season. The second season, titled Megalobox 2: Nomad, aired from April 4 to June 27, 2021, on Tokyo MX and BS11. The main staff and cast members returned to reprise their roles. Funimation licensed the second season. Following Sony's acquisition of Crunchyroll, the series was moved to Crunchyroll. The second season ran for 13 episodes.

=== Manga ===
Chikara Sakuma launched a manga adaptation of the Megalobox anime titled Megalo Box - Shukumei no Sōken (メガロボクス 宿命の双拳, "Megalo Box: The Twin Fists of Fate") which was serialized in Kodansha's Shōnen Magazine Edge from February 17, 2018, to August 17, 2018, with two published volumes.

== Reception ==
Critical response to the anime has been positive with Anime News Network referring to it as "One of the coolest anime I've ever seen" despite relying on common tropes from storylines and not all major characters standing out. Despite pointing out multiple issues the anime suffers, Otaku USA praised the anime, calling it one of the best ones from 2018 and that it makes an honorable tribute to Ashita no Joe. Similarly, Manga.Tokyo stated that despite the multiple flaws the anime suffers, it is still a great homage to Ashita no Joe and praised the handling of the main character whom the audience would cheer. Kotaku listed as one of the best anime from Spring 2018 claiming it "has the style and grit of Cowboy Bebop with the light-hearted adrenaline of modern sports anime like Slam Dunk based on the design provided. Michael B. Jordan revealed that the emotional foundation for Joe's fights in Megalobox inspired the film Creed III.
