= Ashita no Joe =

Japanese manga series and its franchise

- Ashita no Joe: Fighting for Tomorrow
- First tankōbon volume cover, featuring Joe Yabuki (left) and Tooru Rikiishi (right)

あしたのジョー
- Genre: Sports
- Manga
- Written by: Asao Takamori
- Illustrated by: Tetsuya Chiba
- Published by: Kodansha
- English publisher: NA: Kodansha USA
- Magazine: Weekly Shōnen Magazine
- Original run: January 1, 1968 – May 13, 1973
- Volumes: 20
- Anime television series

Tomorrow's Joe
- Directed by: Osamu Dezaki
- Produced by: Koji Tomioka; Tatsuo Ikeuchi; Tadami Watanabe; Takaharu Bessho
- Music by: Masao Yagi
- Studio: Mushi Production
- Licensed by: NA: Crunchyroll
- Original network: FNS (Fuji TV)
- Original run: April 1, 1970 – September 29, 1971
- Episodes: 79
- Anime film

Tomorrow's Joe
- Directed by: Yōichirō Fukuda; Osamu Dezaki (chief director)
- Produced by: Hisao Masuda
- Written by: Yōichirō Fukuda
- Music by: Kunihiko Suzuki
- Studio: Sankyo Eiga; Fujifilm; Herald Enterprise; Mushi Production
- Licensed by: NA: Discotek Media
- Released: March 8, 1980
- Runtime: 152 minutes
- Anime television series

Tomorrow's Joe 2
- Directed by: Osamu Dezaki
- Produced by: Seiji Takahashi; Shunzo Kato
- Written by: Atsushi Yamatoya; Haruya Yamazaki; Hideo Takayashiki; Yoshimi Shinozaki
- Music by: Ichiro Araki
- Studio: Tokyo Movie Shinsha
- Original network: NNS (NTV)
- Original run: October 13, 1980 – August 31, 1981
- Episodes: 47
- Anime film

Tomorrow's Joe 2
- Directed by: Osamu Dezaki
- Produced by: Tokuhachi Shimada
- Written by: Atsushi Yamatoya; Haruya Yamazaki; Hideo Takayashiki; Osamu Dezaki; Yoshimi Shinozaki
- Music by: Ichiro Araki
- Studio: Herald Enterprise; Fujifilm; Chiba Planning; Tokyo Movie Shinsha
- Licensed by: NA: Discotek Media
- Released: July 4, 1981
- Runtime: 114 minutes
- Live action films
- Tomorrow's Joe (1970); Tomorrow's Joe (2011)
- Related
- Joe vs. Joe (2003); Megalobox (2018–2021)
- icon

Ashita no Joe (Japanese: あしたのジョー, Hepburn: Ashita no Jō; 'Tomorrow's Joe'), also known as Ashita no Joe: Fighting for Tomorrow, is a Japanese manga series written by Asao Takamori and illustrated by Tetsuya Chiba. It follows drifter Joe Yabuki, who discovers a passion for boxing in a juvenile prison, and his rise through Japan's and the global boxing scene.

Ashita no Joe was serialized in Kodansha's Weekly Shonen Magazine from 1968 to 1973, with its chapters collected in 20 tankōbon volumes. During its serialization, it was popular with working-class people and college students in Japan. It has been adapted into various media, including the Megalobox anime, a futuristic reimagining of the original that was made as a part of the series' 50th anniversary.

The manga has been widely influential, with numerous anime and manga referencing it.

== Plot ==
Joe Yabuki, a young drifter, has a chance encounter with alcoholic former boxing trainer Danpei Tange while wandering through the San'ya slums. Recognizing his talent, Danpei trains Joe as a boxer, but Joe is arrested for fraud. He fights Nishi Kanichi, the leader of a group of hooligans, in temporary jail, and the two are transferred to a juvenile detention center. There, Joe meets Tōru Rikiishi, a former boxing prodigy, and they develop a rivalry after Rikiishi prevents him from escaping. The prison sets up a boxing tournament led by Danpei and funded by millionaire Mikinosuke Shiraki and his granddaughter Yoko. Rikiishi dominates Joe in the final until the latter hits a cross-counter, resulting in a double knockout. Feeling that the match did not resolve anything, Joe and Rikiishi vow to fight again as professional boxers.

Upon his release from the juvenile detention center, Joe joins Danpei's new tiny boxing gym together with Nishi. Joe gains popularity as an amateur boxer for his brawling style and trademark cross-counter KO wins, but he is denied a professional license until provoking champion boxer Wolf Kanagushi. Joe performs a triple cross counter on Wolf to win their match, and earns the right to fight Rikiishi in the professional ring.

Rikiishi is assured a promising career funded by Mikinosuke Shiraki, but is intent on settling his score with Joe. Because he is a featherweight, while Joe is a bantamweight, Rikiishi undergoes a taxing weight loss program. Their match is close. Rikiishi knocks Joe out in the 8th round to win, but later dies from the combined effects of weight loss and a brain hemorrhage sustained during the fight.

Joe is traumatized by Rikiishi's death. Danpei realizes that Joe is unable to deliver headshots to his opponents. Joe loses three straight fights and eventually disappears to join an illegal countryside boxing ring. He returns to fight global sixth ranked fighter Carlos Rivera. Carlos is managed by Yoko, who, having become interested in Joe, has taken over her father's gym. The fight devolves into a brawl, but Joe earns tremendous fame and respect, and he and Carlos become friends. Carlos is later knocked out in the first round by world champion José Mendoza and suffers severe brain damage.

After his fight with Carlos, Joe becomes recognized as a world ranked boxer. He struggles with maintaining bantam weight due to a late growth spurt, forcing him to undergo strenuous weight loss similar to what Rikiishi underwent. He defeats OPBF Champion Kim Yong-bi, a South Korean boxer and survivor of the Korean War, and proceeds to win several title defenses. Meanwhile, Yoko has secured the rights for Mendoza's next title defense. Fearing that Joe has lost his fighting instincts, she forces him to face Malaysian fighter Harimau before he can challenge Mendoza. Joe narrowly wins the fight.

The fight against Mendoza is to be held in a packed Tokyo stadium. Before the fight, Yoko discovers that Joe is suffering from punch-drunk syndrome. She attempts to cancel the match, confessing her love for him, but he refuses.

Mendoza dominates the early rounds, and Joe loses his vision in one eye. Initially composed, Mendoza begins losing his mind as Joe continues to hold on no matter how much damage he takes. Joe manages to knock down Mendoza several times. The match eventually goes all fifteen rounds. Joe hands Yoko his gloves, and tells Danpei that everything has "burnt to ashes." Mendoza is declared the winner by points, but his hair has turned white from the trauma of the fight. Danpei turns to console Joe only to find him sitting unresponsive in his chair, with a smile on his face.

It has long been debated whether Joe died in the ending. Artist Chiba stated that he drew the ending at the last minute, and that Takamori's original ending was different. Takamori stated in a 1979 biography that Joe died, while Chiba has refused to directly comment, hinting that Joe may have survived. In a 2001 interview, forensic pathologist Masahiko Ueno concluded that Joe had to be alive in the final panel to remain upright.

== Media ==
=== Manga ===
Ashita no Joe originally serialized in the shōnen manga magazine Weekly Shōnen Magazine from January 1, 1968, to May 13, 1973. It was collected into 20 tankōbon volumes by Kodansha. Most of the chapters of the manga were reprinted in Shukan Gendai from March 2, 2009, to the year end.

In February 2024, Kodansha USA announced that they had licensed the manga for English release in North America. They will release it digitally and in eight oversized hardcover volumes, starting in December of the same year.

=== Anime ===
==== TV series ====
Mushi Productions produced an anime television series broadcast by Fuji TV from April 1, 1970, to September 29, 1971. A second anime television series, which started from volume 9 and covered the rest of the series, was made by TMS Entertainment and was broadcast by Nippon TV from October 13, 1980, to August 31, 1981. Both anime were directed by Osamu Dezaki. On March 2, 2005, the complete version of the first anime was released by Nippon Columbia on 2 DVD box sets, covering 33 hours and 55 minutes of footage across 79 episodes spanning 16 disks. It also includes an all-color explanation book in 3 volumes totaling 120 pages. Previous release formats include mini-box sets on September 21, 2001, and individual discs on September 21, 2002. Crunchyroll began streaming Ashita no Joe 2 (あしたのジョー2) from March 24, 2014, under the name Champion Joe.

Crunchyroll began streaming the first series under the name Tomorrow's Joe in November 2024.

In 2018, Megalobox, a futuristic reimagining of the original, was released as part of the manga's 50th anniversary. The series being the final concept of many initial ideas from director Moriyama, one concept being for the story to be based around Rikiishi Toru, Joe's fated rival and lifelong friend.

==== Films ====
Edited versions of the two anime series were distributed as anime films by Nippon Herald Films on March 8, 1980, and July 4, 1981, respectively. Tai Seng released the first anime film in the United States on DVD in 2008, under the name Champion Joe. Discotek Media later released Champion Joe on Blu-Ray.

The first film, Tomorrow's Joe, earned a distributor rental income of ¥500 million at the Japanese box office in 1980.

=== Live-action films ===
A live-action film based on the manga was released in 1970 in Japan, featuring Shōji Ishibashi as Joe Yabuki, Ryūtarō Tatsumi as Danpei Tange and Seiichirō Kameishi as Tōru Rikiishi.

The second live-action film adaptation premiered in Japan on February 11, 2011, starring Tomohisa Yamashita as Joe Yabuki, Teruyuki Kagawa as Danpei and Yūsuke Iseya as Tōru Rikiishi. The live-action film also received positive response from Hollywood Reporter's Maggie Lee who praised the cast's boxing but criticized the characterization of Danpei and Yoko. Russell Edwards from Variety enjoyed the director's work and, like Lee, enjoyed the work of the leading actors. The film grossed ¥1.1 billion ($14 million) at the Japanese box office in 2011.

=== Stage play ===
A stage play directed by Eiichi Yogi, ran from May 25 to May 29, 2016, at the Sumida Park Studio Kura theatre in Tokyo.

=== Radio drama ===
A radio drama was broadcast by TBS Radio from October 3 to October 28, 1977, for 20 episodes, featuring Yoshito Yasuhara as Joe Yabuki.

=== Video games ===
| Title | Publisher | Developer | Platform | Release date |
|---|---|---|---|---|
| Tomorrow's Joe | CSK | Filcom | PC-8801, FM-7 | July 1983 |
| Tomorrow's Joe | Taito | Wave Corp | Arcade | 1990 |
| Legend of Success Joe | SNK | Wave Corp | Neo Geo | 1991 |
| Tomorrow's Joe | K Amusement Leasing | Wave Corp | SNES | November 27, 1992 |
| Boxing Mania: Tomorrow's Joe | Konami | | Arcade | 2001 |
| Tomorrow's Joe Touchi: Typing Namida Hashi | Sunsoft | Sunsoft | PlayStation 2 | March 29, 2001 |
| Tomorrow's Joe 2: The Anime Super Remix | Capcom | Capcom | PlayStation 2 | June 20, 2002 |
| Tomorrow's Joe Masshiro ni Moe Tsukiro! | Konami | | PlayStation 2 | December 4, 2003 |
| Tomorrow's Joe Makkani Moeagare! | | Konami | Game Boy Advance | December 4, 2003 |
| Sunday vs Magazine: Shūketsu! Chōjō Daikessen | Konami | Hudson Soft | PlayStation Portable | March 26, 2009 |

== Reception and legacy ==
The manga was very popular, having sold over 20 million copies after its serialization. Also, during its serialization, it was particularly popular with working-class people and college students who were involved in the New Left, who saw themselves likewise struggling against the system like Joe Yabuki did and revered him as an icon. An example of this New Left influence were the members of the Japanese Red Army who took part in the Yodogo hijacking in 1970 and compared themselves to Joe as they saw a revolutionary message in the manga. During the hijack, they shouted "We are tomorrow's Joe!"

Ashita no Joe has received generally positive reviews, with many critics praising the story and characters. On October 13, 2006, it was voted "Japanese Favorite TV Anime" placing 4 out of 100 among celebrities votes. Joe Yabuki was ranked seventh in Mania Entertainment's "10 Most Iconic Anime Heroes", written by Thomas Zoth, who commented that, "Tomorrow's Joe captured the zeitgeist of 1960s Japan. The story of Joe's rise from nothing touched a chord with Japanese audiences, who were seeing their country prosper after a long period of postwar devastation." Anime News Network's reviewer Justin Sevakis analyzed the series, praising its story line but criticized some aspects about the first movie adaptation. He praised Joe's character development and his relationship with other boxers. According to The Japan Times' Mark Schilling, the series "became the template for not only Fumihiko Sori's 2011 live-action film of the same title, but many Japanese sports movie and TV franchises."

Ashita no Joe has been considered one of the most influential manga, with many anime and manga referencing it. For the animated adaptation of the manga Naruto, animator Atsushi Wakabayashi from Pierrot said he was influenced by Ashita no Joe. This was mostly because the staff members were fans of the series and felt the character Naruto Uzumaki to be close to the type of archetype they rooted for when watching the series. As a result, Wakabayashi and the rest of the staff members made Naruto stand out in episode 133 where there was too much focus in his fight against Sasuke Uchiha, whom he shared an intense rivalry. The opening sequence of Osamu Dezaki's film also influenced anime director Gorō Taniguchi during the production of Code Geass: Lelouch of the Re;surrection. Joe was also a major influence in Kyo Kusanagi, the main character of SNK's fighting game series, The King of Fighters. Anime director Kenji Kamiyama, most known for the Ghost in the Shell: Stand Alone Complex series, cited the original anime among the 15 best anime of all time.

The manga was nominated for the Eisner Awards's Best U.S. Edition of International Material—Asia category in 2025. The series and the lettering by Evan Hayden won the Japan Society and Anime NYC's second American Manga Awards in the Best New Edition of Classic Manga Series and Best Lettering categories, respectively, in the same year.
