= Yoshiko Yamamoto (voice actress) =

Japanese voice actress (born 1936)

- 山本 嘉子
- Born: Yoshiko Kondō (近藤 嘉子); October 16, 1936 (age 89); Tokyo Prefecture, Japan
- Occupations: Actress; voice actress
- Years active: 1950–present
- Agent: Office Kaoru
- Notable credit: Sazae-san as Wakame Isono
- Spouse: Yōsuke Kondō (died 2024)

Yoshiko Kondō (近藤 嘉子, Kondou Yoshiko; born October 16, 1936), known professionally as Yoshiko Yamamoto (山本 嘉子, Yamamoto Yoshiko), is a Japanese actress who specializes in voice acting.

She is currently affiliated with Office Kaoru and her husband was Japanese actor Yōsuke Kondō (近藤洋介, Kondou Yousuke; August 8, 1933 – November 2024).

She is best known for being the original voice of the character Wakame Isono in the Fuji TV television anime series Sazae-san.

== Biography ==
Yamamoto was born in Tokyo Prefecture, Japan on October 16, 1936.

She graduated from the Nihon University College of Art.

While she was in university, she joined the TBS Broadcasting Drama Troupe as a 6th-term member in March 1958, with her classmates including Takako Sasuga and Sumiko Shirakawa. Before she had joined, she was a part of the Sanno Theater Company.

Yamamoto has been affiliated with Seinen Kobo, Nakagawa Pro, Tsuchi no Kai, Akasaka Production, Mausu Promotion, and Sun Ace Kikaku, with her current affiliation being with Office Kaoru.

As of 2024, following the deaths of Ichirō Nagai (Namihei Isono) in 2014, Miyoko Asō (Fune Isono) in 2018, Shinsuke Chikaishi (Masuo Fuguta) in 2022, Takako Sasuga (Tarao Fuguta) in 2023, and Nobuyo Ōyama (Katsuo Isono) in 2024, she and Midori Katō (Sazae Fuguta) are the last surviving original cast members of the Sazae-san anime series.

== Personality ==
Her vocal range is alto.

Her personal hobby is pottery. She is fluent in speaking French and obtained a certification in Braille.

Yamamoto frequently portrayed roles that required her to "dub naturally" and would portray characters who acted in a straightforward manner. She has also portrayed characters driven into tragic situations.

In October 1958, she was selected to portray Nami Katagiri, the heroine of the National Arts Festival-participating television drama Mammoth Tower. Director Hajime Ishikawa initially planned to cast a theater actress, but noticed Yamamoto's performance in the television drama O Sage Shachō and decided to cast her, feeling that her naturally bright and straightforward demeanor perfectly suited the role. In preparation, she learned horseback riding at Seifukai in Funabashi, Chiba Prefecture, and Western dancing from Dan Yada.

She stepped down from the role of Wakame Isono on Sazae-san after the March 28, 1976 broadcast. While her official reason for leaving was claimed to have been because of "health issues", Michiko Nomura, her successor from 1976 to 2005, revealed that Yamamoto stepped down because she had gone to France, which prompted the production staff to hold auditions to find a new voice.

Yamamoto has revealed that she is a mother of a few children, and that whenever she would go to PTA meetings in 1975, the other mothers present there would ask her to "do Wakame-chan", much to her embarrassment.

== Filmography ==
=== Television anime ===
- Jungle Emperor Leo (1965): Mary
- Harris no Kaze (1966): Abou Ishida
- Animal 1 (1968): Rokurō Azuma
- Sabu to Ichi Torimono Hikae (1968): Tarokichi
- Marine Boy (1969): Young John, Pit Boy
- Sazae-san (1969–present): Wakame Isono (first voice)
- Moomin (1969): Too-Ticky
- Ninpu Kamui Gaiden (1969): Genta
- The Adventures of Hutch the Honeybee (1970): Aya
- Akakichi no Eleven (1970): Mamoru Asuka (Ryouko's brother)
- Ashita no Joe (1970): Boy (episode 66)
- Andersen Monogatari (1971): Tin soldier (episode 4), Mouse (episode 6), Ketty (episodes 42–43)
- Kunimatsu-sama no Otōridai (1971): Ābō
- Shin Obake no Q-Tarō (1971): Doronpa
- Nozomi in the Sun (1971): Additional voice
- Golgo 13 (1971): Additional voice
- Marvelous Melmo (1971): Biriken (episode 9), Tadao (episode 13)
- Tensai Bakabon (1971): Additional voice
- Onbu Obake (1972): Ojō
- Kashi no Ki Mokku (1972): Baby Crow, Mario
- Shin Moomin (1972): Too-Ticky
- The Gutsy Frog (1972): Additional voice
- Karate Master (1973): Maid (episode 7), Katherine (episodes 23–25), Somvan (episodes 34–35)
- Demetan Croaker, The Boy Frog (1973): Chiro, Awa-ko, Lily, Baby Bird, Additional voice
- Kōya no Shōnen Isamu (1973): Additional voice
- Jungle Kurobe (1973): Gakku (second voice)
- Miracle Girl Limit-chan (1973): Tomoo Asami
- Little Wansa (1973): Chibikuro, Ichiro, Roro's Owner
- The Song of Tentomushi (1974): Mizuo Isshū (first voice)
- Time Bokan (1975): Mikerobo, Additional voice
- Nobody's Boy: Remi (1977): Arthur
- Tōshō Daimos (1978): Child
- The Adventures of the Little Prince (1978): Cliff, Gym
- Astro Boy (1980): Pook (episode 20), Pipi (episode 36)
- Ashita no Joe 2 (1980): Chelsea
- Eagle Sam (1983): Chichi
- The Twins at St. Clare's (1991): Mademoiselle

=== Theatrical anime ===
- The Adventures of Hutch the Honeybee: Wish Upon a Forget-Me-Not (1971): Aya
- The Adventures of Hutch the Honeybee: Being Held By Mama (1972): Aya
- Magical Girl Limit-chan (1974): Additional voice
- Fushigi no Tatari-chan (2000): Grandma

=== Television drama ===
- O Sage Shachō (1958)
- Mammoth Tower (1958)
- Ai Rabu Teishu (1959)

=== Radio drama ===
- Uchi no Otōchan (1958)
