= Reiko Katsura =

Japanese voice actress (1937–2026)

- 桂 玲子
- Born: Reiko Kaneuchi (金内 玲子); February 8, 1937; Fukuoka City, Fukuoka Prefecture, Japan
- Died: February 22, 2026 (aged 89)
- Other name: Reiko Shiratori (白鳥麗子)
- Occupation: Voice actress
- Years active: 1958–2025
- Agent: Haikyō
- Spouse: Kikuo Kaneuchi (金内 喜久夫) (died 2020)

Reiko Kaneuchi (金内 玲子, Kaneuchi Reiko; February 8, 1937 – February 22, 2026), professionally known as Reiko Katsura (桂 玲子, Katsura Reiko), was a Japanese voice actress. She was affiliated with Haikyō and was married to Japanese actor Kikuo Kaneuchi (金内 喜久夫, Kaneuchi Kikuo; January 29, 1933 – April 28, 2020).

== Biography ==
Katsura was born in Fukuoka City, Fukuoka Prefecture on February 8, 1937.

Ever since she was a young girl, she loved to perform in front of others. During her junior high school years, she was particularly passionate about Shin-buyo (neo-classical Japanese dance), and during the Hakata Dontaku festival, she would get her own props and costumes to dance on streets from corner to corner with her father.

During her time at Kyushu Girls' High School, now known as Fukuoka University Wakaba High School, Katsura performed in a wide variety of productions as a member of the drama club.

In 1958, after she graduated from high school, she joined the local Kyushu Asahi Broadcasting Drama Troupe. Katsura briefly served as a hostess of a radio show with her husband under the stage name "Reiko Shiratori".

In 1963, she moved to Tokyo when her husband Kikuo traveled to join Bungakuza at Hiroshi Akutagawa's invitation. During the audition, he asked her, "Why don't you try taking the test too?" She passed the audition and entered as a third-generation trainee, staying with the company for a year.

After joining Bungakuza, Katsura started her voice acting career. By turning down jobs requiring traveling far from home like location shoots for live-action productions, voice acting became her main profession.

In 1964, she started being affiliated with Haikyō.

=== Death ===
Katsura died of respiratory failure caused by aspiration pneumonia on February 22, 2026, at the age of 89. Her death was announced by her agency Haikyō a month later on March 4 of that year.

== Personality ==
Katsura's vocal range was mezzo-soprano.

While she primarily voiced young child and baby character roles as a voice actress, she also frequently voiced older characters on stage, showing her versatility.

Her personal specialty was nihon-buyō and she was a certified practitioner of the Fujima school.

=== Sazae-san ===
In Sazae-san, Katsura voiced the characters of Ikura Namino, Rika Nozawa, and Kaori Ōzora from the 1970s until she stepped down from the roles in 2025. She initially joined the series a semi-regular cast member, but their specific signature parts naturally emerged from that experience, with acting rarely being a struggle for her, with her saying, "I've been doing this since I was young and fearless, and I just have a great time performing."

Ikura's voice was originally a sound effect, but once the character started saying "hāi", Katsura was cast in the role. Although the production team later considered having him speak normally, they ultimately decided to stick with Ikura expressing himself using only three variations: "hāi," "chān," and "babūn". Since there were only three lines of dialogue, Katsura once considered speaking in the exact same pattern every time, but felt the reactions from the people around her were poor, so after that, she would make sure to vary her speech based on the situation and the surrounding lines.

In 1997, Katsura left Sazae-san for a period of time, with voice actress Taeko Kawata serving as her substitute.

She revealed around 2022 that when she returned to voice Rika after a year, the more she tried to remember how to play the role, the harder it became. Relying too heavily on technical skills made the performance lifeless, leading to a rare slump.

== Filmography ==
=== Television animation ===
List of voice performances in television animation
Year	Title	Role	Notes	Source
1964–1965	Wolf Boy Ken	Dorothy, Mama		
1968	Cyborg 009	Additional voice		
1968	Sally the Witch	Kanna		
1969	Attack No. 1	Deko		
1969	GeGeGe no Kitarō	Additional voice		
1969	Sabu to Ichi Torimono Hikae	O myō		
1969	Ninpu Kamui Gaiden	Gomame		
1969	The Genie Family	Additional voice		
1969–1970	Mōretsu Atarō	Additional voice		
1970	Akakichi no Eleven	Yoko		
1970–1971	Star of the Giants	Michi		
1971–2025	Sazae-san	Ikura Namino, Rika Nozawa, Kaori Ōzora, Suzuko Siota	First voice	
1971	New Little Ghost Q-Tarō	O-Jirō	Second voice	
1971	GeGeGe no Kitarō	Additional voice		
1971	Tiger Mask	Yoko Takaoka		
1971	Tensai Bakabon	Additional voice		
1972	Astroganger	Additional voice		
1972	Akado Suzunosuke	Namino Daisuke		
1972	Pinocchio: The Series	The Granddaughter, Nīna		
1972	Sarutobi Ecchan	Additional voice		
1972–1974	The Gutsy Frog	Shūsaku, Additional voice		
1972	Hazedon	Tamii		
1973	Jungle Kurobe	Aka-bee	Main role	
1973–1974	Dororon Enma-kun	Harumi	Main role	
1973	Mazinger Z	Ayuko Kitō	Ep. 51	
1973–1974	Aim for the Ace!	Additional voice		
1974	Calimero	Priscilla	Second voice	
1974	New Honeybee Hutch	Additional voice		
1974	Samurai Giants	Additional voice		
1974	Jūdō Sanka	Erika Tatewaki		
1974	Kōya no Shōnen Isamu	Additional voice		
1975	Ikkyū-san	Sayo-chan	Main role	
1975	Getter Robo G	Maria		
1975	Time Bokan	C-robot, Mimi	Main role	
1975	Dog of Flanders	Alois	Second voice	
1975	Reideen the Brave	Miho		
1976	Gowappa 5 Gōdam	Mako, Yoshiko	Credited as "Reiko Katsura" (桂令子)	
1976	Chōdenji Robo Combattler V	Roboco		
1976	3000 Leagues in Search of Mother	Peter		
1976	Paul's Miraculous Adventure	Princess, Aria		
1976	Beeton The Robot	Beeton	First voice	
1977–1979	Yatterman	Omotchama		
1977	Tenguri, Boy of the Plains	Additional voice	Television film	
1978	Her Majesty's Petite Angie	Harrison		
1978	Majokko Tickle	Mako	Credited as "Reiko Katsura" (桂れい子)	
1979	Cyborg 009	Flora	Ep. 8	
1979	Zenderman	Kepepe, Anne, Momotaro		
1980	Dracula	Lilas		
1980	Space Warrior Baldios	Girl		
1980	Mū no Hakugei	Mu	Lead role	
1981–1985	Dr. Slump – Arale-chan	Chivil	Debuts in Ep. 34	
1982	Hello! Spank	Additional voice		
1982	Boku Patalliro!	Madeline	Ep. 9	
1982	Fuku-chan	Kiyoshi Shimizu		
1984	Oyoneko Boonyan	Aunt		
1984	Little Memole	Barbara		
1994	Tsuyoshi Shikkari Shinasai	Washino's mother		
2011	Nichijou	Nano's Little Toe, Narration	Ep. 1	
2018	Layton Mystery Tanteisha: Katori no Nazotoki File	Mittaly Mitara	Ep. 21	
2019	The Helpful Fox Senko-san	Kuroto Nakano's grandmother	Debuts in Ep. 1	

=== Theatrical animation ===
List of voice performances in theatrical animation
Year	Title	Role(s)	Notes	Source
1970	Chibikko Remi to Meiken Kapi	Liza		
1976	Ikkyū-san	Sayo-chan		

=== Original video animation (OVA) ===
List of voice performances in original video animation
Year	Title	Role(s)	Notes	Source
1994	Time Bokan Royal Revival II - Alumni Reunion in the Tatsunokon Kingdom	Omotchama		

=== Dubbing ===
==== Television ====
List of dub performances in overseas television productions
Title	Role	Notes	Source
Bewitched	Tabitha Stephens (Erin Murphy)		
