= Takako Sasuga =

Japanese voice actress (1936–2023)

- 貴家 堂子
- Born: Takako Horiuchi (堀内 堂子) (née Sasuga (貴家)); February 4, 1936; Tokyo Prefecture, Japan
- Died: February 5, 2023 (aged 87); Tokyo, Japan
- Occupation: Voice actress
- Years active: 1963–2023
- Agent: Haikyō
- Notable credit(s): Sazae-san as Tarao Fuguta; The Genie Family as Akubi; Tensai Bakabon as Hajime-chan; Danganronpa as Usami/Monomi

Takako Sasuga (貴家 堂子, Sasuga Takako; February 4, 1936 – February 5, 2023) was a Japanese voice actress.

Her most notable voice roles are as Tarao Fuguta in Sazae-san, Akubi in The Genie Family, and Hajime-chan in Tensai Bakabon.

She is also well known for voicing Usami/Monomi in the Danganronpa franchise.

== Biography ==
Sasuga was born and raised in Tokyo Prefecture in a family that runs a hospital. Her career began after high school when, because she did not want to practice cooking and cleaning ready for bridal training, a friend invited her to audition for a radio drama, which she passed and made her debut.

Sasuga then experienced opposition from her parents and actual marriage, and considered retiring from her career several times, but continued to work, as she had never lost any regular appearances since her debut.

Sasuga specialized in playing the roles of infants and young girls, taking advantage of her cutie voice. Because most of these roles were performed with her natural voice, a recording staff member once told her, "You can't play adult roles," which troubled her for a time, but this became an opportunity for her to master such roles. In 2012, she said in a conversation, "My voice is weird. The truth is, I am not good at listening to my voice, but I am responsible for the work I perform in and I always check them out".

In 1961, she took on the role of dubbing Jay North's Dennis Mitchell in the Japanese dub of Dennis the Menace, which became her breakout role. As such, she dubbed for the same role in the 1993 film by John Hughes.

In 1969, Sasuga was cast as Sazae-san character Tarao Fuguta, the son of the titular character Sazae. It became her signature character role and she continued to voice the role without ever being replaced. In 2011, she, Midori Katō (Sazae), Miyoko Asō (Fune), and Ichirō Nagai (Namihei) were awarded the Merit Award at the Tokyo Anime Awards for their long running roles on Sazae-san since the beginning of the show's broadcast, and in 2019, she was recognized by the Guinness World Records alongside Katō for having the "longest career as a voice actor for the same character of an animated TV series" record.

In 2012, she played the role of Usami/Monomi in Danganronpa 2: Goodbye Despair. This was the first time in her career that she appeared in a video game.

=== Death ===
Sasuga died on February 5, 2023, at the age of 87. The cause of death was undisclosed, but she was not ill and died suddenly in good health. Her posthumous work was Sazae-san, which was recorded as usual three days before her death and was broadcast on February 26.

== Filmography ==
=== Television animation ===
List of voice performances in television animation
Year	Title	Role(s)	Notes	Source
1964	Astro Boy	Pipi, Magnet-chan		
1965	Jungle Emperor Leo	Hippo	Ep. 6	
1967	The Golden Bat	Tribal Boy		
1967	Kaminari Boy Pikkaribee	Cardan		
1967	Princess Knight	Twink	Main role	
1968	Star of the Giants	Additional voice		
1968	Humanoid Monster Bem	Boy		
1968	Fight Da!! Pyūta	Additional voice	Ep. 25	
1969	Plum Star Prince	Miyoko Kawai		
1969	Ninpu Kamui Gaiden	Hill Myna	Ep. 20	
1969	Sazae-san	Tarao Fuguta	Main role; First voice	
1969	The Genie Family	Akubi, Mouse, Osaka Fair Companion	Main role; Osaka Fair Compainion in Ep. 45	
1969	Moomin	Thingumy		
1970	The Secret of Akko-chan	Young Girl		
1970	Attack No. 1	Additional voice		
1971	The Adventures of Hutch the Honeybee	Yukimushi, Tenko		
1971	Little Ghost Q-Tarō	Additional voice		
1971	Tensai Bakabon	Hajime-chan, Additional voices	Main role	
1972	Akado Suzunosuke	Additional voice		
1972	New Moomin	Thingumy		
1972	Hazedon	Icchin	Main role	
1973	The Gutsy Frog	Aka-chan, Additional voices		
1973	Demetan Croaker, The Boy Frog	Akako the Brown Frog	Ep. 26	
1975	Maya the Honey Bee	Leaf-roller Beetle Larva, Locust		
1975	Reideen the Brave	Kōhei "Koppepan" Izu		
1975	Ganso Tensai Bakabon	Hajime-chan, Additional voices		
1976	Ikkyū-san	Otae		
1977	Rascal the Raccoon	Martha Conway		
1979	Anne of Green Gables	Lily Jones		
1980	Astro Boy	Gen Hoshino	Ep. 17	
1981	The Wonderful Adventures of Nils	Henry	Ep. 43	
1983	I Am A Dog: Don Matsugorou's Life	Chōtarō	Main role; Television special	
1983	The Call of the Wild	Additional voice		
2008	Kannagi: Crazy Shrine Maidens	Shige Kamimori	Ep. 12	
2013	Danganronpa: The Animation	Usami/Monomi	Ep. 13	
2016	Danganronpa 3: The End of Hope's Peak High School	Miaya Gekkogahara (Monomi)		

=== Theatrical animation ===
List of voice performances in theatrical animation
Year	Title	Role	Notes	Source
1963	Gauche the Cellist	Additional voice		
1984	Nausicaä of the Valley of the Wind	Girl B		
1986	Open the Door	Mise		

=== Video games ===
List of voice performances in video games
Year	Title	Role	Notes	Source
2012	Danganronpa 2: Goodbye Despair	Usami/Monomi		
2012	Danganronpa 1 2 Reload	Usami/Monomi		
2021	Danganronpa S: Ultimate Summer Camp	Usami/Monomi		

=== Dubbing ===
==== Live-action film ====
List of dub performances in live-action films
Title	Role	Notes	Source
Baby the Rain Must Fall	Margaret		
Bunny Lake Is Missing	Bunny Lake (Suky Appleby)		
Dennis the Menace	Dennis Mitchell (Mason Gamble)		
Giant			
Now and Forever	Penny (Shirley Temple)		
The Alamo			
The Lion	Tina (Pamela Franklin)		
The Sugarland Express	Baby Langston		

==== Television ====
List of dub performances in television productions
Title	Role	Notes	Source
Burke's Law			
Bewitched			
Dennis the Menace	Dennis Mitchell (Jay North)		
Shane			
The Fugitive	Phil (Kurt Russell)		
The Man from U.N.C.L.E.			
The Twilight Zone			

==== Animation ====
List of dub performances in animation
Title	Role	Notes	Source
A Boy Named Charlie Brown	Sally Brown		
Groovie Goolies	Sabrina		
Woody Woodpecker	Chilly Willy		
