= Yuuyake Banchō =

Japanese manga by Ikki Kajiwara

- cover of volume 2 published by Akita Shoten

夕やけ番長
- Manga
- Written by: Ikki Kajiwara
- Illustrated by: Toshio Shouji
- Published by: Akita Shoten
- Magazine: Bōken Ō Weekly Shōnen Champion
- Original run: 1967 – 1971
- Volumes: 17
- Anime television series
- Directed by: Renzo Kinoshita; Yoshiyuki Tomino
- Written by: Shunichi Yukimuro; Yoshiaki Yoshida
- Studio: Tokyo TV Doga
- Original network: Nippon Television
- Original run: September 30, 1968 – March 29, 1969
- Episodes: 26

Yuuyake Banchō (Japanese: 夕やけ番長, Hepburn: Yūyake Banchō; lit. Sunset Banchō) is a Japanese manga series written by Ikki Kajiwara and illustrated by Toshio Shoji. The term "banchō" refers to the leader of youth delinquents in Japan.

== Plot ==
Chuuji Akagi has just transferred to a new school and soon discovers it's overrun by a youth gang. Akagi has a strong sense of justice and fights the gang leader through various sports in order to protect the school. As he wins, he slowly begins to reform the school.

== Characters ==
=== Main characters ===
Chuuji Akagi

Voiced by: Midori Katō
The protagonist, and a first grader in middle school (7th grade) at the time of the story. While he is of short stature, he is actually quite athletic and muscular. Despite Akagi's great athleticism, he lacks in academics and gets poor grades. He holds a strong sense of justice and loyalty to his friends. Because of his parents' death, he loses the willingness to fight at sunset.

Teruo Aoki

Voiced by: Kiyoshi Komiyama
Akagi's classmate, his nickname is "Intelligent" (インテリ, Interi). He also plays a narrator role to the series. Contrary to Akagi, he has amazing grades, but lacks athletic ability. Nonetheless he joins the kickboxing club by Akagi's encouragement. He later becomes the captain of the table tennis club. He has romantic feelings for Yoko, but is aware that she loves Akagi and stays her friend instead.

Yoko Mizunoe

Voiced by: Tomoko Watanabe
Akagi's classmate, she excels in academics and athletics, in addition to being beautiful. She joins the volleyball clubs and later becomes captain. She has romantic feelings for Akagi.

Kojiro Kose

Akagi's classmate, he is originally the banchou of the school. His fighting ability is about the same as Aoki's, but he is a genius of social skill and scouts various people to fight against Akagi. After being inspired by the morals of Akagi, he becomes captain of the soccer club after initially enrolling in the kickboxing department. Kose proves tough to truly change as he continues to produce enemies of Akagi by performing misbehaving.

Mr. Araki

Akagi's teacher. He is in love with the professional wrestler "Atomic Rosa" and almost confesses his love to her.

Kantaro

An elementary school student who lives next door to Akagi. He admires Akagi who he thinks is a fighting genius and calls him "boss", much to Akagi's dismay.

Takeshi Akagi

Chuuji's grandfather whom he lives with. He is a master of Jiu-Jitsu.

=== Rival characters ===
Hiroshi Kosai

A student at the neighboring school, Hakua Gakuen. He is the only son of a wealthy man and on the surface seems well-manner, but in actuality is malicious and is a banchou in the shadows. In his first battle with Akagi, he nearly blinds Akagi. After a second fight with Akagi, he becomes more reformed and becomes good friends with Akagi.

Yusuke Kurobe

The first enemy who was scouted by Kose. Although he is in the second grade, he 4 years older because he was in a juvenile training school. In front of Akagi he fights against Red Shodo, the great leader of the shadow, and comes out victorious, even though he cannot use one arm. Because of this, his fight against Akagi is postponed. After finally fighting Akagi, they become friends. He participates in the Kickboxing Division along with the former Bayer Association, and then become the captain of his school's baseball club.

Saburo Tenma

He formerly worked at a circus and has excellent motor skills and grip strength. In their fight, Tenma grabs Akagi's arms with both hands and cannot escape due to his strong grip and thus loses. Akagi liked Tenma's older sister, but because the circus she was in with Tenma moves, he does not romantically pursue her.

Kyogei Samegawa

A genius in high school karate, he has a physique comparable to a heavyweight boxer. He is called "Frankenstein's monster" and the like. After Akagi started the kickboxing club along with the former head coach, Samegawa caused trouble and the kickboxing club versus the karate club led by Samegawa. In the match against Samekawa, Akagi was initially disadvantageous at the beginning, but wins.

Suzumu Hayate

One of Akagi's rivals who participates in a non-fighting sport, he is in the baseball club at Hakua Gakuen. He confront against Akagi who became a supporter of the baseball club. In his fight with Akagi, they play baseball instead of physically fighting. Akagi initially loses, but wins after learning how to hit a breaking ball.
Robert Douglas
An American student and the soccer club captain. He has two matches against Akagi who briefly served as the goalkeeper as the soccer club assistant. He uses an overhead kick that Akagi cannot catch, but in the end, Akagi cleared the overhead kick that he himself had released with a punch, not a kick.

Genpei Watari

Only appearing on the side, he is one of Akagi's rivals in the "Banjo throne determination game" that Ruriko Maki, who is the daughter of the director of Kohwa High School.

Tsubakijo Shiro

After Akagi became the captain of the kick boxing club, Shiro decides to play a game against the boxing department of the juvenile training school. He had the strongest fighting ability among the enemies of the past who fought against Akagi. As a result of intense exercise, he is finally able to fight equally, but no settlement is drawn even in after fighting several times.

== Release ==
The episodes of the anime ran for 10 minutes. The anime has never been released on home video format. The manga has been reissued twice, as 7 volumes and as 15 volumes.
