= Yasuo Iwata =

Japanese voice actor

Yasuo Iwata (岩田 安生, Iwata Yasuo; January 19, 1942 – October 24, 2009) was a Japanese voice actor from Iwate, most known for his role as Nanbutsu Isasaka in Sazae-san.

== Death ==
Yasuo Iwata died from lung cancer on October 24, 2009, aged 67.

== Voice roles ==
- Cosmic Baton Girl Comet-san (King, Mago-Consigliere)
- Heat Guy J (Old Man (ep.5))
- Last Exile (Marius)
- Lupin III: the Columbus Files (special) (The President)
- Sazae-san (Nanbutsu Isasaka)
- Shadow Star (Shiina's grandfather (ep.1))
- The Vision of Escaflowne (Asona)
- Tokyo Mew Mew (Mr. Ijuuin (ep.29))
- Zenki (Kukai (ep.19-21))

=== Dubbing ===
- Charlotte's Web, Dr. Dorian (Beau Bridges)
- Kindergarten Cop (1995 TV Asahi edition), Captain Salazar (Richard Portnow)
- The Majestic, Doc Stanton (David Ogden Stiers)
- Ocean's Twelve (2007 NTV edition), Bank Officer
- Screamers, Secretary Green (Bruce Boa)
