= Tokyo Actor's Consumer's Cooperative Society =

Japanese talent management agency

The Tokyo Actor's Consumer's Cooperative Society (東京俳優生活協同組合, Tōkyō Haiyū Seikatsu Kyōdō Kumiai), also known as Haikyō (俳協), is a Sendagaya, Shibuya-based talent management agency and cooperative representing Japanese voice actors.The cooperative was established in 1960.

== Current members ==
The members of Haikyō, as of this date, are:

=== Male ===
- Wataru Abe
- Chō (Yūichi Nagashima)
- Issei Futamata
- Yūichi Iguchi
- Masaru Ikeda
- Shūichi Ikeda
- Dai Matsumoto
- Akira Murayama
- Masatomo Nakazawa
- Masanori Shinohara
- Junichi Suwabe
- Gakuto Kajiwara
- Yasuaki Takumi
- Kōichi Tōchika
- Kentarō Kumagai

=== Female ===
- Miho Arakawa
- Sawa Ishige
- Shizuka Ishikawa
- Reiko Katsura
- Juri Kimura
- Hisako Kyōda
- Junko Minagawa
- Saki Miyashita
- Kaoru Morota
- Kazusa Murai
- Tomo Muranaka
- Akiko Nakagawa
- Saki Nakajima
- Yūko Nakamura
- Rio Natsuki
- Sayaka Ohara
- Nozomi Sasaki
- Yōko Sasaki
- Rina Satō
- Toshiko Sawada
- Ai Shimizu
- Yū Sugimoto
- Hina Suguta
- Eri Suzuki
- Hiroko Taguchi
- Minami Takahashi
- Nao Tamura
- Atsumi Tanezaki
- Masumi Tazawa
- Azumi Waki
- Hibiku Yamamura

== Former members ==
Former members of Haikyō, as of this date, are:

=== Male ===
- Shin Aomori (moved to Sigma Seven)
- Tōru Furuya (moved to Aoni Production)
- Goblin (moved to Across Entertainment)
- Kōichi Hashimoto (moved to Production Tanc)
- Michio Hazama (represents Mouvement)
- Shōzō Iizuka (moved to Sigma Seven)
- Seizō Katō (deceased)
- Kazuhiko Kishino (deceased)
- Kōichi Kitamura (Hajimu Kimura) (moved to Mausu Promotion before death)
- Motomu Kiyokawa (deceased)
- Kiyoshi Kobayashi (deceased)
- Yasuaki Kurata (represents Kurata Promotion)
- Hiroshi Masuoka (deceased)
- Tatsuo Matsumura (deceased)
- Bandō Mitsugorō X (Bandō Yasosuke V)
- Katsuji Mori (represents Office Mori)
- Ichirō Nagai (moved to Aoni Production before death)
- Shūsei Nakamura (retired)
- Tadashi Nakamura (deceased)
- Ryūsei Nakao (moved to 81 Produce)
- Daisuke Namikawa (moved to Across Entertainment)
- Toku Nishio (deceased)
- Nachi Nozawa (moved to Ken Production before death)
- Tamio Ōki (moved to Mausu Promotion before death)
- Teiji Ōmiya (deceased)
- Ryūzaburō Ōtomo (moved to Aoni Production)
- Ikuya Sawaki (moved to Arts Vision)
- Tomokazu Seki (moved to Atomic Monkey)
- Hidekatsu Shibata (moved to Aoni Production)
- Akira Shimada (moved to Engekishūdan Mitō before death)
- Daisaku Shinohara (moved to 81 Produce)
- Hirotaka Suzuoki (moved to Ken Production before death)
- Kazuya Tatekabe (became manager of Kenyū Office before death)
- Naoki Tatsuta (moved to Aoni Production)
- Kenjirō Tsuda (moved to Mediarte Entertainment Works as a voice actor and to Stardust Promotion as an actor)
- Toshiya Ueda (moved to 81 Produce)
- Takeshi Watabe (moved to 81 Produce before death)
- Kōichi Yamadera (moved to Across Entertainment)
- Naoki Yanagi (manages deux and represents FreeMarch)
- Jōji Yanami (moved to Aoni Production before retirement and death)
- Kazuki Yao (moved to Sigma Seven)
- Daisuke Kishio (moved to Horipro)

=== Female ===
- Miyoko Asō (deceased)
- Fumi Hirano (moved to Horipro)
- Chieko Honda (moved to Max Mix before death)
- Masako Ikeda (deceased)
- Kazue Ikura (moved to Aoni Production)
- Yō Inoue (deceased)
- Midori Katō (went freelance)
- Ryōko Kinomiya (Deceased)
- Rica Matsumoto (moved to Sun Music)
- Yōko Matsuoka (moved to 81 Produce)
- Chiaki Morita (affiliated with Across Entertainment)
- Rie Murakawa (moved to Stay Luck)
- Miki Nagasawa (moved to Atomic Monkey)
- Michiko Nomura (general manager of Ken Production)
- Fumiko Orikasa (moved to Atomic Monkey)
- Yoshino Ōtori (moved to Ken Production)
- Sumie Sakai (Deceased)
- Yoshiko Sakakibara (went freelance)
- Chika Sakamoto (Chinatsu Ishihara) (moved to Arts Vision)
- Eri Sendai (moved to Amuleto)
- Masako Sugaya (moved to Arts Vision)
- Hiroko Suzuki (moved to Ken Production)
- Sanae Takagi (moved to Aoni Production)
- Gara Takashima (moved to Across Entertainment)
- Sakiko Tamagawa (moved to Sigma Seven)
- Michie Tomizawa (moved to Aoni Production)
- Keiko Yokozawa (Keiko Nanba) (represents Yūrin Pro)
- Konami Yoshida (moved to Production Tanc)
