= Yuko Uno =

Japanese chanson singer (born 1947)

- 宇野 ゆう子
- Born: January 25, 1947 (age 79); Tokyo, Japan
- Occupations: Chanson; anime song
- Years active: 1952–present
- Agent: Leave
- Known for: Theme song vocals for Sazae-san
- Label: EMI Music Japan (now Universal Music Japan)

Yuko Uno (宇野 ゆう子, Uno Yuko; born January 25, 1947) is a Japanese chanson singer from Tokyo. She was the vocalist of the opening theme "Sazae-san" and the ending theme song "The Sazae-san Family" of the long-running anime television series Sazae-san.

== Biography ==
Uno was born in Tokyo, Japan on January 25, 1947. She began performing children's songs when she was five years old.

She graduated from the Vocal Music Department at the Musashino Academia Musicae Junior College, with her mentor being chanson singer and composer Akira Ui. After honing her skills as a chansonnier at venues such as Ginparis, she established herself as one of Japan's leading chanson singers.

In 1968, Uno released her single "Como Esta Akasaka" as a member of the Mahalo Echoes. She signed an exclusive contract with EMI Music Japan in 1969. Later that same year, she performed the vocals for the opening and ending theme songs of the Japanese anime television series Sazae-san. She also performed the vocals for the theme song of the TBS children's television drama The Ken-chan Series that ran from 1969 to 1982.

== Discography ==
=== Singles ===
Side A	Side B	Release date	Record label	Catalogue number	Note
Como Esta Akasaka	Wakaretemo	1968	Victor Entertainment	SV-713	Released under "Mahalo Echoes, Yuko Uno"
Janken Ken-chan (Yasuyuki Miyawaki)	Sayonara Mata Ashita	1969	Toshiba	TC-1132	Theme song for Janken Ken-chan
Sazae-san	The Sazae-san Family	November 10, 1969	Toshiba	TC-1135	Theme song for Sazae-san
Ken-chan Toko-chan Go! Go! Go!	Papa to Mama Ga Chitchana Toki Asonda Uta	1970	Toshiba	TC-1147	Theme song for Ken-chan Toko-chan
Sazae-san	The Sazae-san Family	June 5, 1974	Toshiba	TC-3030	
Saikai	Marine Blue	1980	Toshiba	TP-17035	
Sazae-san	The Sazae-san Family	September 23, 1992	Toshiba EMI	TODG-2001	
Min'na o Suki Ni 〜 Tsumottayuki	Kodama de Seu Ka 〜 Suna no Ōkoku	1999	Toshiba EMI	PCDLZ-1146	"Misuzu Kaneko/Yume no Sekai"

=== Albums ===
Title	Release date	Record label	Catalogue number
First album		Toshiba EMI	LRS-820
Black Coffee	May 21, 1990	Victor Entertainment	VICP-41
Kouhii wa Ai no Kaori	October 21, 1992	Victor Entertainment	VICP-178
Ashita no Tobira o Akete	2008		

=== EP ===
Title	Release date	Label	Catalogue number	Note
Amefuri Otsukisan/Teru Teru Bōzu/Shikararete/Ashita		Toshiba Musical Industries Ltd.	TH-3237	Performed "Amefuri Otsukisan" and "Shikararete"
