= Sazae-san =

Japanese manga and anime television series

- Cover of the eleventh volume of the bilingual version of the manga by Kodansha, depicting the lead character Sazae riding a horse with her little sister Wakame.

サザエさん
- Genre: Slice of life
- Manga
- Written by: Machiko Hasegawa
- Published by: Asahi Shimbun
- English publisher: JP: Kodansha Bilingual Comics
- Magazine: Fukunichi Shinbun; Asahi Shimbun, etc.
- Original run: April 22, 1946 – February 21, 1974
- Volumes: 68 (6,477 comic strips)
- Anime television series
- Sazae-san (1969–present)
- icon

Sazae-san (サザエさん) is a Japanese yonkoma manga series written and illustrated by Machiko Hasegawa. It was first published in Hasegawa's local paper, the Fukunichi Shinbun (フクニチ新聞), on April 22, 1946. When the Asahi Shimbun wished to have Hasegawa draw the four-panel comic for their paper, she moved to Tokyo in 1949 with the explanation that the main characters had moved from Kyūshū to Tokyo as well. The first Sazae-san strip run by the Asahi Shimbun was published on November 30, 1949. The manga dealt with everyday life and contemporary situations in Tokyo until Hasegawa retired and ended the series, with the final comic published on February 21, 1974.

As of 1999, the manga had over 86 million copies in circulation, making it one of the best-selling manga series of all time. An anime television adaptation by TCJ (later renamed Eiken) began airing in Japan in October 1969 and holds the Guinness World Record for the longest-running animated television series. It has also been adapted into a radio show, theatrical plays and songs.

== Plot ==
In the beginning, Sazae was more interested in being with her horse than dressing up in a kimono and makeup to attract her future husband. Hasegawa was forward-thinking in that, in her words, the Isono/Fuguta clan would embody the image of the modern Japanese family after World War II.

Sazae was a very liberated woman, and many of the early plotlines revolved around Sazae bossing around her husband, to the consternation of her neighbors, who believed that a man should be the head of his household. Later, Sazae became a feminist and was involved in many comical situations regarding her affiliation with her local women's lib group.

Despite the topical nature of the series, the core of the stories revolved around the large family dynamic, and were presented in a lighthearted, easy fashion. In fact, the final comic, in 1974, revolved around Sazae's happiness that an egg she cracked for her husband's breakfast produced a double yolk, with Katsuo remarking about the happiness the "little things" in life can bring.

In current culture, the popular Sazae-san anime is frequently viewed as a nostalgic representation of traditional Japanese society, since it represents a simpler time before many of the changes brought by modern technology. Its social themes, though very liberal at the time of its publication, are evocative of a bygone and nostalgic era.

== Characters ==
A typical Sazae-san strip

=== Isono and Fuguta family ===
- Sazae Fuguta (フグ田 サザエ, Fuguta Sazae) (née Isono (磯野))

The main character. Age 24 (27 in the manga). She marries Masuo.
She is a housewife, but occasionally works part-time as a maid for the Yumizu family, a wealthy family in the neighborhood.
She has a unique hair style. This is one of the Victory rolls that were popular at the time manga was started, and she has maintained this hairstyle since the fad passed.
She is bright, cheerful, and popular in the town with a personality like that of a split bamboo.
Her talkativeness and goofiness are shortcomings, and she is sometimes taken aback by her family, but most of the time she is well-liked by those around her.
Voiced by: Midori Katō

- Namihei Isono (磯野 波平, Isono Namihei)

Sazae's father and patriarch of the family. Age 54.
He is characterized by a single hair on his bald head, and he is very protective of that single hair.
He hates crookedness and can be stubborn, often scolding Sazae and Katsuo, but he also has a compassionate and good-natured side.
He appears to be full of dignity and dignity, but in fact has an unreliable side.
When he scolds, he often says, "Baka-monn!" (馬鹿者!) (It means "Fool!") However, he does not really believe this, and in his heart of hearts, he has a love for his children, wanting them to grow up to be good people. This is also known as a famous line that symbolizes him.
Voiced by: Ichirō Nagai (1969–2014), Chafurin (2014–present)

- Fune Isono (磯野 フネ, Isono Fune) (née Ishida (石田))

Sazae's mother. Aged in her 50s (48 in the manga); born in Shizuoka.
She is a stay-at-home mom and proud of her position. She does all the housework and is the epitome of a good wife and wise mother.
She is calm and trusted by all of her family. She is an important behind-the-scenes supporter of the family, mediating domestic disputes.
On the other hand, as a girl she was a tomboy, and this side of her personality is sometimes apparent.
Voiced by: Miyoko Asō (1969–2015), Yorie Terauchi (2015–present)

- Masuo Fuguta (フグ田 マスオ, Fuguta Masuo)

Sazae's husband. He is a salaryman in the sales department of a trading company. 28 years old (32 in the manga). Born in Osaka.
After marrying her, they lived together in a rented house, but were advised by the landlord to move out of the house due to misconduct (in his case, trying to remove the fence of the house without permission), and soon moved in with her family.
He is good-natured and timid, which can lead to a loss-making role, and he sometimes says and does things that one might consider black-hearted. However, his gentle and honest nature has earned him the trust of Sazae's family, and he himself lives happily every day surrounded by Sazae's family.
Voiced by: Shinsuke Chikaishi (1969–1978), Hiroshi Masuoka (1978–2019), Hideyuki Tanaka (2019–present)

- Katsuo Isono (磯野 カツオ, Isono Katsuo)

Sazae's younger brother who is an 11-year-old fifth grader.
He is quick-witted, well-spoken, and has a flattering personality. He knows how to get on in the world and to be good with people. In the manga in 1973, he was sarcastically referred to by Sazae as "the Kissinger of our family". but, he does not do well with schoolwork and refuses to do his homework.
He likes mischief and often suffers under the wrath of Sazae when he accidentally insults other guests in the manner of faux-pas.
He is often scolded by Namihei, usually when he finds out about Katsuo's low test grades and mischief.
His main activities consist of playing baseball and soccer with his friends.
Voiced by: Nobuyo Ōyama (1969–1970), Kazue Takahashi (1970–1998), Miina Tominaga (1998–present)

- Wakame Isono (磯野 ワカメ, Isono Wakame)

Sazae's younger sister. Age 9 (7 in the manga). She features a Bob cut.
She is one of the characters whose personalities differ greatly between manga and anime.
In the manga, she is a talkative girl with a noticeably mischievous personality due to her young age.
In the anime, she is a kind honor student. Therefore, her role in the manga is sometimes handled by Tarao, but sometimes, she shows her mischievous nature from the manga.
She likes to study, but is not good at PE. Her main hobbies are reading and fashion.
Voiced by: Yoshiko Yamamoto (1969–1976), Michiko Nomura (1976–2005), Makoto Tsumura (2005–present)

- Tarao Fuguta (フグ田 タラオ, Fuguta Tarao)

Masuo and Sazae's 3-year-old son. Usually called Tara-chan (タラ ちゃん).
He is interested in everything and has a curious nature.
While a mostly well-behaved toddler, he can be a bit stubborn.
Sometimes he tries to be selfish and annoys his parents. However, he is a child who can honestly admit and apologize when he knows he is wrong.
In the anime, he is so polite and uses honorifics that it makes it hard to believe he is 3 years old. This is said to reflect the character of Takako Sasuga, who voiced him from the beginning of the broadcast until her sudden death in 2023.
Voiced by: Takako Sasuga (1969–2023), Rikako Aikawa (2023–present)

- Tama (タマ)

The Isono family's pet cat. He hates mice.
Voiced by: ?

=== Isono and Fuguta family's kin ===
- Norisuke Namino (波野 ノリスケ, Namino Norisuke)

He is a nephew of Namihei and a cousin of Sazae, Katsuo, and Wakame. Ages 24–26. He works for a newspaper publisher.
He is a cheerful character, an optimist who is always ready to take it easy without worrying about details.
He is also shrewd and has a brazen side, such as entering Isono family's house without telling them and eating the cakes they keep without permission, but he is not a hateful type of person, so he gets a lot out of life.
Voiced by: Ichirō Murakoshi (1969–1998), Tarō Arakawa (1998–2000), Yasunori Matsumoto (2000–present)

- Taiko Namino (波野 タイ子, Namino Taiko)

Norisuke's wife. Age is about 22 years old.
She is known as a particularly beautiful woman in the anime and has a demure personality. She also has a strong core and supports Norisuke behind his back like his wife would, and Norisuke cannot resist her.
She is very comfortable with Sazae, who she is close in age with.
Voiced by: Ryoko Aikawa, Masako Ebisu (1969–1979), Emiko Tsukada (1979–2013), Sayaka Kobayashi (2013–present)

- Ikura Namino (波野 イクラ, Namino Ikura)

Norisuke and Taiko's son. Age is about one and a half years old.
He is Tarao's friend and only says "chan", "hai", and "babuu".
Voiced by: Reiko Katsura (1969-2025), Sachie Hirai (2025–present)

- Isono Mokuzu Minamoto no Sutamina (磯野藻屑源素太皆)

Namihei's Meiji Revolution samurai ancestor. Around the time of the Bon Festival, he haunts Namihei's (or sometimes Katsuo's) dreams.
Voiced by: Ichirō Nagai (1970–2013), Chafurin (2014–present)

- Umihei Isono (磯野 海平, Isono Umihei)

Namihei's twin older brother.
Voiced by: Ichirō Nagai (1970–2013), Chafurin (2014–present)

=== Isasaka family ===
- Nanbutsu Isasaka (伊佐坂 難物, Isasaka Nanbutsu)

A novelist who lives in the next house over from the Isono family's house.
Voiced by: Sanji Hase (1970–1978), Eken Mine (1985–2002), Atsushi Ii (2002), Yasuo Iwata (2002–2009), Kōtarō Nakamura (2009–2023), Shigeru Ushiyama (2023–present)

- Karu Isasaka (伊佐坂 軽, Isasaka Karu)

Nanbutsu's wife. Fune's childhood friend.
Voiced by: ? (1970–1978), Reiko Yamada (1985–2023), ? (1994, 1996), Yui Komazuka (2023–present)

- Ukie Isasaka (伊佐坂 浮江, Isasaka Ukie)

Nanbutsu's daughter.
She is one of the characters that Katsuo is secretly in love with.
Voiced by: ? (?), Miho Ochiai (1974), ? (?), Keiko Han (1985–1989), Reiko Katsura (1989), Miina Tominaga (1989–1998), Eriko Kawasaki (1998–present)

- Jinroku Isasaka (伊佐坂 甚六, Isasaka Jinroku)

Nanbutsu's son.
Voiced by: ? (1970–1978), Hiroshi Takemura (1985–2023), Manabu Sakamaki (2023–present)

- Hachi (ハチ, Hachi)

The Isasaka family's pet dog.

=== Other characters ===
- Grandpa Ura-no (裏のおじいちゃん, Ura-no Ojīchan)

An original anime character modeled after a guest character from the manga.
An old man who lives in a house in back of the (ura-no) Isono family's house.
Voiced by: ? (?–1985), Eken Mine (1985–2002), Atsushi Ii (2002–2013), Mitsuru Takakuwa (2013–present),

- Grandma Ura-no (裏のおばあちゃん, Ura-no Obāchan)

An original anime character modeled after a guest character from the manga.
Ura-no Grandpa's wife.
Voiced by: ?, Sumiko Shirakawa, Keiko Yamamoto, Reiko Yamada (1990s substitute)

- Saburo (三郎, Saburō)

The employee of Mikawaya who makes house calls for food orders.
An original anime character modeled after a guest character from the manga.
Voiced by: Issei Futamata

- Rika Nozawa (野沢 リカ, Nozawa Rika)

An original anime character.
One of Tarao's friends.
Voiced by: Reiko Katsura (1969–2025), Taeko Kawata (1997), Sayaka Kitahara (2025–present)

- Takeo (タケオ, Takeo)

An original anime character.
One of Tarao's friends.
Voiced by: Sumiko Shirakawa (?), Reiko Yamada (?–2019), Eriko Kawasaki (?), Miina Tominaga (?), Nozomi Mikajiri (2020–present)

- Hiroshi Nakajima (中島 博, Nakajima Hiroshi)

An original anime character modeled after a guest character from the manga.
Katsuo's best friend and his classmate.
Voiced by: Sumiko Shirakawa (1969–2015), Rumi Ochiai (2015–present)

- Kaori Ozora (大空 カオリ, Ōzora Kaori)

An original anime character.
Katsuo's girlfriend, she is said to be the most beautiful girl in her class.
She is one of the characters that Katsuo is secretly in love with.
Voiced by: ? (1969–?), Reiko Katsura (?–2025), Michiko Nomura (1972, 1975), Taeko Kawata (1997)

- Hayakawa (早川, Hayakawa)

One of Katsuo's girlfriends.
She is one of the characters that Katsuo is secretly in love with.
Voiced by: ? (?), Reiko Katsura (1975), Keiko Han (1985–1990), Miina Tominaga (1990–1998), Eriko Kawasaki (1998–present),

- Hanako Hanazawa (花沢 花子, Hanazawa Hanako)

An original anime character modeled after a guest character from the manga.
One of Katsuo's girlfriends, who has a crush on him. She is the daughter of a real estate agent.
Although Katsuo is bewildered and avoids her ardent approach, they actually tend to get along quite well.
Voiced by: Mitsuko Asō (1971–?), Tikako Akimoto (1971–?), Yoshiko Ōta, Keiko Yamamoto (?–2023), Teiyū Ichiryūsai (2015), Kazue Ikura (2020), Kumiko Watanabe (2023–present)

- Tōru Hashimoto (橋本 とおる, Hashimoto Tōru)

An original anime character.
One of Katsuo's best friends.
Voiced by: ? (1971–?), Reiko Yamada (?–present)

- Takuma Nishihara (西原 卓磨, Nishihara Takuma)

An original anime character.
One of Katsuo's best friends.
Voiced by: Katsue Miwa (1972–?), Emiko Tsukada (?–2013), Sayaka Kobayashi (2014–present)

- Teacher (先生, Sensei)

An original anime character.
Katsuo's teacher.
Voiced by: Hiroshi Ōtake (1969), ? (?), Kaneta Kimotsuki (1971), ? (?), Eken Mine (?–2002), Sanji Hase (?), ? (2002), Ikuya Sawaki (2002–present)

- Horikawa (堀川, Horikawa)

An original anime character.
Wakame's boyfriend.
Since the 2010s, he has been described as a psychopathic speaker and has become an Internet meme in Japan. also, He used to be set up by Wakame as secretly liking him, but in recent years Wakame has sometimes made statements that seem to indicate that she dislikes him.
Voiced by: Sumiko Shirakawa (1971–?), ? (?), Emiko Tsukada (?–2013), Sayaka Kobayashi (2014–present)

- Suzuko Siota (塩田 スズ子, Shiota Suzuko)

An original anime character.
Wakame's best friend.
Voiced by: Reiko Katsura (?–2022), Sayaka Kitahara (2022–present)

- Miyuki (ミユキ, Miyuki)

An original anime character.
One of Wakame's best friends.
Voiced by: Reiko Katsura (?–1990), Miina Tominaga (1990–1998), Eriko Kawasaki (1998–present),

- Anago (穴子)

An original anime character modeled after a guest character from the manga.
One of Masuo's co-workers. He has thick lips, which are his charm.
Voiced by: Kazuya Tatekabe (1971−197?), Norio Wakamoto (197?–present)

- Kinzō Yumizu (湯水 金蔵, Yumizu Kinzō)

Voiced by: ? (?), Norio Wakamoto

- Mikawaya (三河屋, Mikawaya)

The shopkeeper of Mikawaya, a sake shop.
Voiced by: ? (?), Norio Wakamoto (?), Ikuya Sawaki (2019–present)

- Kintarō Hanazawa (花沢 金太郎, Hanazawa Kintarō)

An original anime character.
Hanako's father. Boss of the Hanazawa Real Estate Agency.
Voiced by: ? (?), Norio Wakamoto (?–present)

== Media ==
=== Manga ===
The comic strip was published in book form by Shimaisha (姉妹社) from 1946 to 1974, which Machiko ran with her sister, Mariko. In April 1993, this publishing company went out of business and the comic books went out of print. The same year, Asahi Shimbun purchased the right to publish the forty-five paperback volumes. Twelve bilingual (Japanese-English) manga volumes were published by Kodansha between 1997 and 1999 as The Wonderful World of Sazae-San. The volumes were re-released in 2004, and in 2015 another three bilingual manga volumes were released as The Best of Sazae-san. By 1999, it has sold over 86 million copies.Sazae-san won the 8th Bungeishunjū Manga Award in 1962.

=== Anime ===
Sazae-san
- Japanese: サザエさん
- Based on: Sazae-san by Machiko Hasegawa
- Directed by: Kondou Kazuhide (chief, 2024–)
- Voices of: Midori Katō; Hideyuki Tanaka; Miina Tominaga; Makoto Tsumura; Rikako Aikawa; Chafurin; Yorie Terauchi
- Music by: Nobuyoshi Koshibe; Kunihiro Kawano
- Country of origin: Japan
- Original language: Japanese
- No. of episodes: 2853+ (Note: Each weekly airing of Sazae-san consists of three separate seven-minute segments. The episode count includes specials.)

Production
- Producers: Kouya Watanabe (2016–); Youichi Tanaka (2016–)
- Running time: 24 minutes
- Production companies: Senkosha (1969–1985); Fuji Television (1985–present); Eiken (Note: Credited as TCJ until 1973)

Original release
- Network: FNS (Fuji TV)
- Release: October 5, 1969 – present

In October 1969, Fuji Television started an anime series, which is still on the air today and currently in production, making it one of the longest-running scripted TV series in history and the longest-running animated show. The broadcast time is every Sunday from 18:30 to 19:00 and has never been changed since its inception. The format is in the form of three vignettes. The anime series has some characters, like Katsuo's classmates, who have not appeared in Hasegawa's original works.

On September 5, 2013, the anime achieved the Guinness World Record for the "Longest running animated TV series". As of December 2025, there have been over 9,000 episodes aired.

The stories are based on at least one strip of the original manga. Due to the limited number of strips, different episodes are based on the same strips. In addition, the unique culture and events in a typical Japanese household, including the four seasons, will always be reflected in the story.

At the start of the anime, it was a slapstick comedy with references to Tom and Jerry, Looney Tunes, etc., but within a year the genre shifted towards a family drama. From this point onward, there has been no major change in style for more than 50 years, in either directing, scriptwriting, or character design. Also because of its popularity, a survey conducted by Nippon Research Center, Ltd. (NRC) in 2020 recorded a high recognition rate of 97% for this anime in Japan. For this reason, it is often described as a "national anime" in Japan and is regarded as a symbol of "universality" and "permanence". Whenever a change is made, such as a change in voice actors, there is always a great deal of media coverage, and the anime retains a strong influence on the public.

In recent years, due to the influence of its unchanging style, it is sometimes criticized as being "anachronistic" or a "period piece", due to elements such as the absence of smartphones and convenience stores in the setting even though the time period is the present day. In response to this, the staff stated, "The appeal of this anime is that it depicts scenes of everyday life and universal relationships that can be found in any family. Therefore, we have no plans in the future to incorporate events or items that would change them." However, some things which have come to be considered inappropriate due to changing times, such as smoking and corporal punishment, have been removed or otherwise addressed.

The anime is not well known outside of Japan, as up until 2026, it had never been exported overseas or otherwise developed globally due to the wishes of the rights holders. However, in 2019, the producer said in a conversation that he hopes to be able to expand globally in the future. In January 2026, it was announced that the anime would be leaving Japan for the first time to be aired on MOMOTV in Taiwan starting from 26 January of that year.

As for voice actors, as of 2023, only Midori Katō, who voices Sazae, has never been changed. Katō was recognized by Guinness World Records in 2019 as the "Longest career as a voice actor for the same character of an animated TV series". As of 2008, 40 years after the anime was first broadcast, four of the seven main characters were the original cast members, but in 2014 Ichirō Nagai, who voiced Namihei, was replaced due to his sudden death at the age of 82, and the following year Miyoko Asō, who voiced Fune, was changed to reflect her age at 89. Takako Sasuga, who voiced Tarao, died suddenly in 2023 at the age of 87 and was recast.

Starting from 1974, the opening is an introduction to the places that Sazae has traveled to and visited throughout Japan. The settings change approximately every three months. Because of the popularity of the anime, this has come to be viewed by cities as a "cost-effective means of promoting tourism," and since 2000, the program has received approximately 5–10 million yen in aid from prefectures and municipalities wishing to introduce the program.

Since November 1991, after the closing credits and the next episode previews, each show has ended with a janken match between Sazae and the viewers at home, in which Sazae holds up a sign representing one of the appropriate hand gestures. From 1969 until October 1991, Sazae ended each episode by tossing a bean or rice cake in the air and catching it in her mouth. Fuji Television switched to the janken match after doctors at Tohoku University Hospital and the National Center for Child Health and Development raised concerns that children may try to imitate Sazae and potentially choke on food.

The anime series was originally sponsored solely by Toshiba—later, in 1998, the program expanded to other sponsors, but the association between Toshiba and Sazae-san remained strong. When Toshiba withdrew its sponsorship due to poor management, it was widely covered in the media.

Sazae-san was the last animated television series to use traditional cel animation, although as of April 2009, the opening credits were digital; the series finally switched to fully digital animation in 2013. Despite the series being a hit, Hasegawa stated that she never wanted any merchandise to be made for it, including home video rights, making availability of past episodes, especially those prior to the introduction of the VCR, very rare. Following her death, her request to prohibit older episodes from being released in home media was honored. Despite this, however, Fuji TV made an agreement with Amazon Prime Video as well as other streaming services in December 2018 to release the 1969 and early-to-mid 1970s episodes available on their streaming service. Some episodes from the mid-2000s are also on the service with episodes from the mid-1990s to the 2010s also being available later on.

The opening song, "Sazae-san", and ending song, "Sazae-san Ikka", are original songs performed by Yuko Uno. Since the anime first started airing, the audio itself has not been altered in any way, such as by arrangement, although it was trimmed to fit the length of the sequences during the early years of airing.

There have been two previous suspensions of animation production: the first, for about a month beginning in February 1975, due to the 1970s energy crisis; the second, for about a month beginning in May 2020, due to the COVID-19 pandemic. Programming during these periods was handled by rebroadcasting past productions.

In Japan, there is a term called "Sazae-san syndrome" (サザエさん症候群, Sazae-san shōkōgun), which refers to a depressed mood on Sunday night after an episode has finished on television, reminding people that the weekend is coming to an end.

=== Live-action ===
In 1955, a radio station aired a serial drama based on the comic strip.

The same year, a short-lived live-action television series was started, and was aired on what is now TBS.

In November 1965, TBS started a dramatic television series modeled after the comic strip. It aired until September 1967.

In 1979, NHK made a dramatic serial which ran for six months, focusing on the creation of Sazae-san and Machiko Hasegawa in her younger days.

In 2010, Fuji Television debuted a live-action situation comedy series, Sazae-san 2 (サザエさん2), followed the following year with Sazae-san 3 (サザエさん3). The series is patterned after the anime series and uses the same elements, including the theme music and the closing janken match.

=== Commercials ===
In 2008, Glico showed the family in "25 years later" commercials, as adults, for the firm's "Otona Glico" chocolates. The characters were portrayed by Eita (as Tarao Fuguta), Tadanobu Asano (as Katsuo Isono), Rie Miyazawa (as Wakame Isono) and Shun Oguri (as Ikura Namino). In 2017, the characters Sazae and Masao were depicted in a Cup Noodles commercial drawn by Katsuya Kondō.

== See also ==
- List of anime series by episode count for a full list of lengthy anime.
- Anpanman
- Chibi Maruko-chan
- Crayon Shin-chan
- Doraemon
- Nintama Rantarō
- Ojarumaru

== Notes ==
Preceded by Ninpu Kamui Gaiden (April 6, 1969 – September 28, 1969)	Fuji TV Sunday 18:30 Timeframe Sazae-san (October 5, 1969 –)	Succeeded by -
