= Harris no Kaze =

Manga and anime series

- Cover of the first volume

ハリスの旋風
- Genre: Sports
- Manga
- Written by: Tetsuya Chiba
- Published by: Kodansha
- Magazine: Weekly Shōnen Magazine
- Original run: 1965 – 1967
- Volumes: 8
- Anime television series
- Directed by: Yoshiyuki Shindo
- Written by: Shunichi Yukimuro
- Studio: P Production
- Original network: Fuji TV
- Original run: May 5, 1966 – August 31, 1967
- Episodes: 70
- Anime television series

Kunimatsu-sama no Otoridai!
- Directed by: Masami Hata
- Produced by: Noboru Ishiguro
- Written by: Koji Ito
- Music by: Keiichi Awano
- Studio: Mushi Productions
- Original network: Fuji TV
- Original run: October 6, 1971 – September 25, 1972
- Episodes: 46

Harris no Kaze (ハリスの旋風(かぜ), Harisu no Kaze; "Harris' Wind") is a Japanese manga series written and illustrated by Tetsuya Chiba, serialized in Weekly Shōnen Magazine in 1965. It was the first manga to be reprinted as a tankōbon in 1967 as part of the Kodansha Comics series.

== Plot ==
The story follows Kunimatsu Ishida, a troublesome school boy who continuously gets expelled from schools for fighting other students. His next school is Harris Academy, where the principal convinces him to join various sports teams. Kunimatsu channels his anger into sports while also realizing he is a great athlete.

== Characters ==
- Kunimatsu Ishida

Voiced by: Nobuyo Oyama

- Principal of Harris Academy

Voiced by: Genzo Wakamiya

- Yoko Asai

Voiced by: Minori Matsushima

- Gouzou Iwanami

Voiced by: Nobuo Tanaka

- Megane

Voiced by: Noriko Ohara

- Abou Ishida

Voiced by: Yoshiko Yamamoto

== Anime ==
An anime adaptation was made in 1966. The series is in monochrome. The opening and ending themes are by Gacha Torian.

A remake was made in 1971 by Tezuka Productions and retitled Kunimatsu's Got It Right! (国松さまのお通りだい, Kunimatsu-sama no Otoridai) The opening theme is Kunimatsu-sama no Otoridai (国松さまのお通りだい) by Kyoko Yamamoto and the ending theme is Gyakuten no Ouen Uta (逆転の応援歌) by Yuri Shimazaki and Vocal Shop.
