= Miyoko Asō =

Japanese actress (1926–2018)

- 麻生 美代子
- Born: April 7, 1926; Tokyo Prefecture, Japan
- Died: August 25, 2018 (aged 92)
- Occupations: Actress; voice actress
- Years active: 1949–2018
- Agent: Tokyo Actor's Consumer's Cooperative Society
- Spouse: Hiroshi Sakonjō (–2008)

Miyoko Asō (麻生 美代子, Asō Miyoko; April 7, 1926 – August 25, 2018) was a Japanese actress. She is best known for her role as the first voice of Fune Isono from 1969 to 2015 in the longest-running Japanese anime series Sazae-san, which first aired in 1969. She was the voice of Dr. Pinako Rockbell in both Fullmetal Alchemist anime adaptations. Asō also starred as an actress in cinema, in the 2006 movie Aogeba Tōtoshi, directed by Jun Ichikawa. In 2015, Asō stepped down from her role in Sazae-san and was replaced by Yorie Terauchi in October. Asō died on August 25, 2018, from senility.

== Filmography ==
=== Television animation ===
- Gegege no Kitarō (1968)
- Akane-chan (1968)
- Sazae-san (1969), Fune Isono (first voice)
- Andersen Stories (1971) Ferone's Nanny (eps 38–40)
- Wandering Sun (1971)
- Marvelous Melmo (1971), Melmo's aunt (first version) (eps 1, 21)
- Kashi no Ki Mokku (1972)
- Science Ninja Team Gatchaman (1972)
- Kerokko Demetan (1973)
- Fables of the Green Forest (1973), Narrator
- Wansa-kun (1973), Animal hospital director
- Alps no Shōjo Heidi (1974), Miss Rottenmeier
- Maya the Bee (1975), Cassandra-sensei
- Huckleberry no Bōken (1976)
- Marco (1976)
- Piccolino no Bōken (1976), Giulietta the cat
- Candy Candy (1976), Mary Jane
- Attack on Tomorrow (1977), Kada sei
- Ippatsu Kanta-kun (1977), Kumiko Tabase
- Angie Girl (1977), Barbara
- The Story of Perrine (1978)
- Tōshō Daimos (1978), Margarete, Okane
- Galaxy Express 999 (1978), Boarding old lady (eps 60–61), Fimeru (ep 42)
- Anne of Green Gables (1979), Rachel Lynde
- Maegami-Taro (1979 special), Grandma
- Captain (1980 special), Takao's Mother
- Botchan (1980 special), Kiyoshi
- Hello! Sandybell (1981), Scott's wife
- Meiken Jolie (1981)
- Andromeda Stories (1982 special), Tarama (Jimsa's nurse)
- Captain (1983), Takao's Mother
- Manga Nihon-shi (1983), Nene
- Mori no Tonto-tachi (1984), Muori (Santa's wife)
- The Harp of Burma (1986 special), Old Woman
- Ranma ½ (1989), Cologne, Faith curer (ep 127), Theme Song Performance (eps 42–56)
- YuYu Hakusho (1992), Elder Ice Maiden
- Romeo and the Black Brothers (1995), Mimi Rossi
- Vampire Princess Miyu (1997), aquarium director (ep 15)
- Master Keaton (1998), Mrs. Burnham (ep 12)
- Inuyasha (2000), Shoga (ep 65)
- The Galaxy Railways (2003), Ine (ep 12)
- Fullmetal Alchemist (2003), Pinako Rockbell
- Maria Watches Over Us (2004), Academy Principal (ep 11)
- Maria Watches Over Us: Printemps (2004), Academy Principal (ep 2)
- El Cazador de la Bruja (2007), Salma (special guest; ep 1)
- Devil May Cry (2007), Margret (ep 8)
- Kure-nai (2008), Old woman (ep 3)
- Clannad After Story (2008), Shino Okazaki (ep 18)
- Fullmetal Alchemist: Brotherhood (2009), Pinako Rockbell

=== Original video animations ===
- Yamataro Comes Back (1986), Woman
- Xanadu Dragonslayer Densetsu (1987), Sherin
- Little Twins (1992), Hara
- Ranma ½ (1993), Cologne
- The Final Flight of the Osiris (2003)
- Xam'd: Lost Memories (2008), Sannova
- Fairy Tail (2011), Hilda

=== Animated films ===
- Galaxy Express 999 (1979), Tochiro's Mother
- Captain (1981), Takao's mother
- Doraemon: Nobita and the Haunts of Evil (1982), Maid
- Ranma ½: Big Trouble in Nekonron, China (1991), Cologne
- Doraemon: Nobita and the Legend of the Sun King (2000), Maid
- Fullmetal Alchemist the Movie: Conqueror of Shamballa (2005), Pinako Rockbell

=== Dubbing roles ===
==== Live-action ====
- Colleen Dewhurst
  - The Dead Zone (1989 TV Asahi edition) (Henrietta Dodd)
  - Anne of Green Gables (Marilla Cuthbert)
  - Anne of Avonlea (Marilla Cuthbert)
  - Dying Young (Estelle Whittier)
  - Anne of Green Gables: The Continuing Story (Marilla Cuthbert)
- Gemma Jones
  - Harry Potter and the Chamber of Secrets (Poppy Pomfrey)
  - Harry Potter and the Half-Blood Prince (Poppy Pomfrey)
  - Harry Potter and the Deathly Hallows – Part 2 (Poppy Pomfrey)
- The Blues Brothers (1983 Fuji TV edition) (Sister Mary Stigmata (Kathleen Freeman))
- Chocolat (Armande Voizin (Judi Dench))
- Duel (Lady at Snakerama (Lucille Benson))
- Dune (Reverend Mother Gaius Helen Mohiam (Siân Phillips))
- Guess Who's Coming to Dinner (Mary Prentice (Beah Richards))
- La Cage aux Folles II (Mrs. Baldi (Paola Borboni))
- Lilies of the Field (1971 TV Asahi edition) (Mother Maria (Lilia Skala))
- Music of the Heart (Assunta Guaspari (Cloris Leachman))
- Sleeping with the Enemy (Chloe Williams (Elizabeth Lawrence))
- Superman Returns (Martha Kent (Eva Marie Saint))
- The Time Machine (1960) (Mrs. Watchett (Doris Lloyd))
- The Time Machine (2002) (Mrs. Watchit (Phyllida Law))

==== Animation ====
- Robin Hood (1975), Mrs. Rabbit
- The Rescuers (1981), Ellie Mae
- An American Tail (1986), Mama Mousekewitz
- An American Tail: Fievel Goes West (1991), Mama Mousekewitz
- Fievel's American Tails (1992), Fievel; Mama Mousekewitz
- Sleeping Beauty (1995), Flora
- Home on the Range (2004), Pearl Gesner

=== Others ===
- Japanese Style Originator (2008–18), Narrator
