= Obake no Q-Tarō =

Japanese manga series

- Little Ghost Q-Taro
- Obake no Q-Tarō on the cover of Bessatsu Shōnen Sunday

オバケのQ太郎 (Obake no Kyū-Tarō)
- Genre: Comedy
- Manga
- Written by: Fujiko Fujio
- Published by: Shogakukan
- Imprint: Tentōmushi Comics
- Magazine: Weekly Shōnen Sunday; Bessatsu Shōnen Sunday
- Original run: 1964 – 1966
- Volumes: 12
- Anime television series
- Directed by: Masaaki Osumi
- Music by: Hiroshi Tsutsui
- Studio: A-Production; Tokyo Movie
- Original network: TBS
- Original run: August 29, 1965 – June 28, 1967
- Episodes: 96
- Manga

Shin Obake no Q-Tarō
- Written by: Fujiko Fujio
- Published by: Shogakukan
- Imprint: Tentōmushi Comics
- Magazine: Shogakukan Learning Magazine; And other Shogakukan children's magazines
- Original run: 1971 – 1973
- Volumes: 4
- Anime television series

Shin Obake no Q-Tarō
- Directed by: Tadao Nagahama
- Produced by: Harutoshi Kawaguchi; Kensuke Fujii (NTV)
- Music by: Naozumi Yamamoto
- Studio: A-Production; Tokyo Movie
- Original network: NTV
- Original run: September 1, 1971 – December 27, 1972
- Episodes: 70 (140 segments)
- Anime television series
- Directed by: Masuji Harada; Hiroshi Sasagawa (Chief director)
- Produced by: Junichi Kimura; Yoshiaki Koizumi (TV Asahi); Yoshio Katō; Seitarō Kodama (Shin-Ei Animation) (Asatsu-DK)
- Music by: Shunsuke Kikuchi
- Studio: Shin-Ei Animation
- Original network: ANN (TV Asahi)
- Original run: April 1, 1985 – March 29, 1987
- Episodes: 510
- Anime film

Obake no Q-Tarō: Tobidase! Bake Bake Daisakusen
- Directed by: Hiroshi Sasagawa
- Music by: Shunsuke Kikuchi
- Studio: Shin-Ei Animation
- Released: March 15, 1986
- Runtime: 15 minutes
- Anime film

Obake no Q-Tarō: Toidase! 1/100 Daisakusen
- Directed by: Hiroshi Sasagawa
- Music by: Shunsuke Kikuchi
- Studio: Shin-Ei Animation
- Released: March 14, 1987
- Runtime: 15 minutes
- Video games
- Chubby Cherub (1985)

Obake no Q-Tarō (Japanese: オバケのQ太郎, Hepburn: Obake no Kyū-Tarō) is a Japanese manga series by Fujiko Fujio about the titular obake, Q-Taro, who lives with the Ōhara family. Q-Tarō, also known as "Q-chan" or "Oba-Q", is a mischief-maker who likes to fly around scaring people and stealing food, though he is deathly afraid of dogs.

The story is usually focused on the antics of Q-Tarō and his friends. The manga was drawn in 1964–1966, 1971–1974, 1976 by the duo Fujiko Fujio (Hiroshi Fujimoto and Motoo Abiko). An English manga volume was published in Japan as Q the Spook.

There are three anime series adaptations of Obake no Q-Tarō. The first was shown on the Tokyo Broadcasting System (TBS) in black and white, and ran from 1965 to 1967. The second series, produced in color, ran from 1971 to 1972 on Nippon TV. The third series ran from 1985 to 1987 on TV Asahi.

A TV guide listing shows evidence that the series was broadcast in the United States in the 1970s as Little Ghost Q-Taro. If this is true, this would make it one of only three works by Fujiko Fujio to reach North America, though there is currently not enough information to exactly confirm this claim. In France, one of the episodes of the 1965 series was aired in November 1967 as part of ORTF Chaine 2's Japanese week, complete with French subtitles.

== Plot ==
The plot of Obake no Q-Tarō follows a boy named Shōta Ōhara, and his ghost friend, Q-taro, who resides in the Shota household. Q-taro is a obake, a ghost, and loves to play tricks on people and steal food due to his appetite, but is horrified, even mortified by dogs.

== Characters ==
- Q-Tarō (Q太郎)

Voiced by: Machiko Soga (1965), Junko Hori (1971), Fusako Amachi (1985)
The titular main protagonist. Q-Tarō has a fear of dogs and cannot transform despite being an obake.

- Shōta Ōhara (大原 正太, Ōhara Shōta)

Voiced by: Kazue Tagami (1965), Yoshiko Ōta (1971), Katsue Miwa (1985)
Q-tarō's human friend, Shōta Ōhara is an elementary school student. Q-Tarō calls him "Shō-chan" (正ちゃん) while Shōta refers to Q-Tarō as "Q-chan" (Qちゃん). His grades are generally poor, and he was once second from the bottom of his class.

- Shin'ichi Ōhara (大原 伸一, Ōhara Shin'ichi)

Voiced by: Masako Nozawa (1965), Sumiko Shirakawa (1971), Yū Mizushima (1985)
Shōta's older brother and the eldest son of the Ohara family who is a middle school student. Unlike Shōta, his academic ability during his middle school days are average. Whenever Shin'ichi is at home, he usually spends his time listening to music, specifically enjoying records from the Beatles and Elvis Presley.

- U-ko (U子)

Voiced by: Hiroko Maruyama (1971), Eiko Masuyama (1985)
U-ko, a judoka, is Q-Tarō's girlfriend obake.

- Doronpa (ドロンパ)

Voiced by: Michie Kita (1965), Yoshiko Yamamoto (1971), Fuyumi Shiraishi (1985)
Doronpa is an American obake. Q-Tarō tends to have a rivalry towards him due to the fact that U-ko idolizes Doronpa's intelligence and he likes to annoy Q-Tarō because he is Japanese.

- P-ko (P子)

Voiced by: Yōko Mizugaki (1965), Kazuko Sawada (1971), Yūko Mita (1985)
P-ko is Q-Tarō's younger sister.

- O-jirō (O次郎)

Voiced by: Makoto Kōsaka→Reiko Katsura (1971), Keiko Yokozawa (1985)
O-jirō is Q-Tarō's younger brother. Although he can understand others' speech, he can only say "bakeratta". Only Q-Tarō can understand what O-jirō is saying.

- X-zō (X蔵)

Father of Q-Tarō, P-ko, and O-jirō.

- O-zetto (おZ)

Mother of Q-Tarō, P-ko, and O-jirō.

- Tsuyoshi Saigō (西郷 強, Saigō Tsuyoshi)

Voiced by: Kaneta Kimotsuki (1965/1971), Hiroshi Takemura (1985)
Nickname: Godzilla. A bully in Shōta's class and neighborhood, He was originally designed and drawn by Shotaro Ishinomori and would become a recurring character in his works such as Sarutobi Ecchan.

- Hakase (ハカセ; "Professor")

Voiced by: Mitsuko Aso (1965), Sumiko Shirakawa (1971), Kaneta Kimotsuki (1985), Naoki Tatsuta (1985, stand-in)
Shōta's smart classmate, He was originally designed and drawn by Shotaro Ishinomori.

- Kizao Kiza (木佐 キザオ, Kiza Kizao)

Voiced by: Unknown (1965), Kazuko Sawada (1971), Naoki Tatsuta (1985)
Shōta's rich classmate who kisses up to Godzilla. His name is also similar to the rich boy in Kaibutsu-kun He has an assortment of 0's and 100's at will.

- Yoshiko Koizumi (小泉 美子, Koizumi Yoshiko)

Voiced by: Mariko Tsukai (1965), Michiko Nomura (1971), Sanae Miyuki (1985)
Shōta's female classmate, always referred to as "Yotchan" (よっちゃん) and U-ko lives with her, She was originally designed and drawn by Shotaro Ishinomori and was based on a recurring character of his being Miko.

- Yukari Kawai (河井 ユカリ, Kawai Yukari) (1985 anime only)

Voiced by: Yoko Asagami (1985)
Shin'ichi's girlfriend. She is a middle school student, and P-ko lives with her.

- Koike (小池)

Voiced by: Hiroshi Ōtake (1965), Akira Shimada (1971), Shingo Hiromori (1985)
Ramen eater character that Q-tarō always eats his ramen whenever he goes to Koike's room. He also appears as a ramen eater in Doraemon, appears as a teacher in Ninja Hattori-kun, appears as Michio's father in Ultra B, appears as between both a ramen eater and teacher in Biriken.

- Kaminari (神成)

Voiced by: Reizo Nomoto (1965/1971), Shingo Kanemoto (1985)
Ohara's neighbor that Doronpa lives with who resembles Doraemon.

== Reception and impact ==
The popularity of the 1965 anime adaptation caused a cultural phenomenon called "Oba-Q boom" (オバQブーム Oba-Kyū būmu), which made the series gain an 30% audience rating, high popularity with children and spawn a variety of toys, songs and clothes, as well a host of imitators. The reason of Q-Tarō's popularity was that the series was grounded in everyday Japanese life, with Q-Tarō questioning the structure of Japanese society and the comedic situations that occurred because of Q-Tarō misinterpreting it.

Pac-Man creator Toru Iwatani cited the series as inspiration for the designs of the Ghosts in the Pac-Man video game series. In the manga series To Love Ru, the ghost character Shizu Murasame has a fear of dogs as an homage to Little Ghost Q-Tarō.
