= Yorie Terauchi =

Japanese actress and voice actress

- 寺内 よりえ
- Born: January 29, 1953 (age 73); Tokyo, Japan
- Education: Tamagawa University
- Occupations: Actress; voice actress
- Years active: 1970-present
- Agent: Theatre Company Subaru
- Height: 160 cm (5 ft 3 in)

Yorie Terauchi (寺内 よりえ, Terauchi Yorie; born January 29, 1953) is a Japanese actress and voice actress from Tokyo, Japan.

== Filmography ==
=== Television animation ===
- Detective Conan (1997) – Etsuko (eps 88–89); Takako (ep 53)
- In the Beginning: The Bible Stories (1997) – Eve
- Fighting Spirit (2000) – Ippo's Mom
- Saiyuki (2000) – Sister
- The Twelve Kingdoms (2002) – Gyokuyou (older)
- Samurai Champloo (2004) – Ogin
- Mokke (2007) – Nakahara's mother (ep 20)
- RIN ~Daughters of Mnemosyne~ (2008) – Yoshie Shimizu (ep 3)
- Little Battlers Experience W (2013) - Claudia Lenetton
- Sazae-san (2015) – Fune Isono (second voice)
- Pandora in the Crimson Shell: Ghost Urn (2016) – Anna
- Yu-Gi-Oh! VRAINS - Takeru's Grandmother

=== Live Action Roles ===
- Kamen Rider BLACK (xxxx) (performed in Episode 3)

=== Dubbing ===
==== Live-action ====
- 28 Days (Lily Cummings (Elizabeth Perkins))
- 88 Minutes (Shelly Barnes (Amy Brenneman))
- The Art of Racing in the Rain (Trish (Kathy Baker))
- Basquiat (Big Pink (Courtney Love))
- Blow (Ermine Jung (Rachel Griffiths))
- Congo (Moira (Mary Ellen Trainor))
- Conviction (Nancy Taylor (Melissa Leo))
- Deadwater Fell (Carol Kendrick (Maureen Beattie))
- Downfall (Magda Goebbels (Corinna Harfouch))
- Erin Brockovich (Pamela Duncan (Cherry Jones))
- Fifty Shades of Grey (Dr. Grace Trevelyan-Grey (Marcia Gay Harden))
- Fifty Shades Freed (Grace Trevelyan Grey (Marcia Gay Harden))
- The Jane Austen Book Club (Sylvia (Amy Brenneman))
- Kissing Jessica Stein (Joan (Jackie Hoffman))
- Let Him Go (Blanche Weboy (Lesley Manville))
- The Man in the Iron Mask (Queen Anne of Austria (Anne Parillaud))
- The People vs. Larry Flynt (Ruth Carter Stapleton (Donna Hanover))
- She-Wolf of London (Miss Rigby (Carol Kirkland))
- Six Feet Under (Margaret Chenowith (Joanna Cassidy))
- State of Play (Cameron (Helen Mirren))
- Super 8 (Mrs. Kaznyk (Jessica Tuck))
- The Wicker Man (Dr. T.H. Moss (Frances Conroy))

==== Animation ====
- Invasion America (Cullen)
