= The Genie Family =

1969 anime television series

- Title card
- ハクション大魔王
- Genre: Comedy
- Created by: Tatsuo Yoshida
- Directed by: Hiroshi Sasagawa
- Opening theme: "Hakushon Daimaō no Uta" (Note: After episode 13, the opening and ending themes were swapped) by Yuri Shimazaki
- Ending theme: "Akubi musume" by Mitsuko Horie
- Country of origin: Japan
- Original language: Japanese
- No. of episodes: 52 (104 segments)

Production
- Producer: Kenji Yoshida
- Production company: Tatsunoko Production

Original release
- Network: FNS (Fuji TV)
- Release: 5 October 1969 – 27 September 1970

Related
- Genie Family 2020

The Genie Family (ハクション大魔王, Hakushon Daimaō) is a Japanese anime television series produced by Tatsunoko Production. It aired from October 5, 1969, to September 27, 1970, with a total of 52 episodes on Fuji Television and its affiliates. It tells the story of a boy who finds a bottle with a mysterious power - each time its user sneezes or yawns, a genie will come up and must grant the user's wish. A 1992 Saban Entertainment English dub called Bob in a Bottle was shown internationally and has later spanned into two other spin-off series featuring the show's characters and a sequel titled Genie Family 2020.

== Plot ==
An old bottle has found its way into the household of a 20th-century family, which consists of an elementary school student named Kan and his parents. A genie, Hakushon, and his daughter, Akubi, reside inside it. When Kan finds the bottle, he discovers that a sneeze summons Hakushon and he must grant the wish of whoever sneezed, while a yawn summons Akubi and she must do the same for whoever yawned. Getting wishes granted by either genie may not be a good thing, for Hakushon messes them up due to his own extreme clumsiness, while the more capable Akubi likes to cause mischief by twisting their words and meanings so that something bad happens.

== Localization ==
The series was dubbed in English by Saban Entertainment in 1992 under the name Bob in a Bottle. A reggae-style theme song was composed for this version. Hakushon, Akubi and Kan were renamed "Bob", "Illana", and "Joey" respectively. Later, Bob in a Bottle was aired in Spanish, German, French, Swedish, Danish, and Hebrew. The English version aired in the United States on PRISM in the Philadelphia area from 1994 to 1995, and also aired on Canada's YTV, Kenya's KTN, Australia's Seven Network in 1993, Zimbabwe's ZBC TV, New Zealand's TV2 in 1994, and the Netherlands' TV10. The motto for the English version is "Make everyday like paradise" and "You sneeze, I please, that's the way it goes". It was shown in Latin America under the name Yam Yam y el Genio, in Italy under the name Il Mago Pancione Etcì and in Arabic speaking countries as El Fatah Borhan.

The English dub of the series was considered lost until April 2020 when a YouTube channel on the history of English anime dubs by the name of Yui-Senpai TV discovered that all episodes of the dub have been preserved on videocassette copies in the Library of Congress. On December 28, 2021, a YouTube channel by the name of TVFourgade discovered that the tapes being held in the Library of Congress are on the U-matic tape format. According to the librarian, the tapes are in decent condition, with some visual noise on one of the tapes. Since 2022, a YouTube channel by the name of FilmwaysVTC has been uploading full episodes of the show taken from syndicated airings on Seven Network in 1992.

== 2020 sequel ==
A new anime television series by Tatsunoko Production and Nippon Animation aired on ytv from April 11, 2020, to September 26, 2020. It is a sequel series that takes place 50 years after the end of the original anime and centers on Akubi and Kantarō, the grandson of the original anime's protagonist. Atsushi Nigorikawa directed the series, with Hiroko Kanasugi handling series composition, Shin Takemoto and Masatsune Noguchi designed the characters, and Takamitsu Shimazaki, Hiroshi Sasaki, and Teppei Shimizu composed the series' music. On May 24, 2020, it was announced that episode 8 and further episodes would be delayed to June 20 due to the COVID-19 pandemic. Viz Media licensed the series as Genie Family 2020 and released it on Crunchyroll on October 15, 2020. The anime is also available on Roku, Peacock and Tubi.

== Cast ==
=== Japanese version (1969) ===
- Hakushon Daimaō - Tōru Ōhira
- Akubi - Takako Sasuga
- Daidaimaō - Ichirō Nagai
- Shakkuri-sensei - Hisako Kyōda
- Kan - Midori Katō
- Daddy - Isamu Tanonaka
- Mommy - Mitsuko Asō
- Gejigon - Kazuya Tatekabe
- Yuriko - Minori Matsushima
- Burukō - Tarō Sagami
- Sorekara-ojisan - Kinya Aikawa

=== English version ===
- Bob - Gary Jewell
- Joey - Sonja Ball
- Mr. Carter - Richard Dumont
- Mrs. Carter/Chauncey - Jane Woods
- Llana - Liz MacRae
- Tilly - A.J. Henderson
- Dora/Miss Green - Kathleen Fee
- Additional Voices - Terrence Scammell, Mark Hellman, Pauline Little, Arthur Holden, Aron Tager, Bronwen Mantel

== Spinoffs ==
The Hakushon Daimaō franchise made a comeback in the 2000s with two animated spinoff series produced by Tatsunoko and directed by Hiroshi Sasagawa, featuring Akubi as the central character and Hakushon as a supporting character.

=== Yobarete Tobedete! Akubi-chan ===
In Yobarete, Tobidete! Akubi-chan (26 episodes, 2001–2002), Akubi (now voiced by Asuka Tanii) befriends a shy young girl named Koron Nemuta (voiced by Sakura Nogawa), who habitually yawns whenever she is embarrassed, thus summoning Akubi forth from the bottle.

=== Akubi Girl ===
In 2006's Akubi Girl (also 26 episodes), Akubi befriends a first-grader named Ruru-chan and attempts to grant her wish of becoming close friends with Itoshi-kun, the boy on whom she has a secret crush.

== Crossover ==
Pandora to Akubi, an anime film crossover between The Genie Family and Monster Strike was released on April 5, 2019.

== Other appearances ==
- A statue of Hakushon Daimaō can be seen in the first episode of the 2008 series of Yatterman.
- Hakushon Daimaō is featured as a playable character in the Japan-exclusive fighting game Tatsunoko vs. Capcom: Cross Generation of Heroes in December 2008. Due to licensing issues, he was removed from the game's internationally-released update, Tatsunoko vs. Capcom: Ultimate All-Stars.
- A brief reference to the series is made in the Mighty Morphin' Power Rangers episode "A Bad Reflection on You" in which clips from the English intro (Bob in a Bottle) are shown on a miniature television. Bulk (portrayed by Paul Schrier) states that it is his favorite cartoon. Music from the show, accompanied by visuals of Around the World in 80 Dreams (another Saban cartoon), also appeared at the end of the season 2 episode "The Power Stealer", where Skull (portrayed by Jason Narvy) enjoys watching.
