= Ryōko Kinomiya =

Japanese actress and voice actress

- 来宮良子
- Born: Ryōko Sakurai 桜井良子; July 10, 1931; Kyoto, Empire of Japan
- Died: November 25, 2013 (aged 82)
- Occupation: Voice actor
- Years active: 1955–2013

Ryōko Kinomiya (来宮 良子, Kinomiya Ryōko; 10 July 1931 – 25 November 2013) was a Japanese actress and voice actress. She was born Ryōko Sakurai in Kyoto, Japan. She was known for her low voice. Kinomiya was the Japanese dub voice of Faye Dunaway. In 2008 she won a Merit Award at the 2nd Seiyu Awards. Kinomiya died of multiple organ failure on 25 November 2013 at the age of 82.

== Filmography ==
=== Television animation ===
1960s

- Astro Boy (1963)
- Speed Racer (Aya Mifune/Mom Racer)

1970s

- Wandering Sun (1971) - (Michiko Nohara)
- Devilman (TV) (1972) - (Ebain)
- Galaxy Express 999 (1978) - (Queen Prometheum)
- The Rose of Versailles (1979) - (Madame Du Barry)

1980s

- Queen Millennia (1981) - (Narrator)
- City Hunter 3 (TV) (1989) - (Haruko)

1990s

- Hell Teacher Nube (1996) - (Narrator)

2000s

- Cyborg 009: The Cyborg Soldier (2001) - (Black Ghost)
- Wolf's Rain (TV) (2003) - (Hanabit)
- Cromartie High School (TV) (2003) - (Narrator)
- Tweeny Witches (2003) - (Grand Master of Witches)
- Phoenix (2004) - (Himiko)

=== Original Video Animation ===
- Crest of the Royal Family (1988) - (Narrator)
- Galerians: Rion (2002) - (Dorothy)

=== Animated films ===
- Galaxy Express 999 (1979) - (Queen Promethium)
- Fumoon (film) (1980) - (Mozu)
- Adieu Galaxy Express 999 (1981) - (Queen Promethium)
- The Fantastic Adventures of Unico (1981) - (Yokaze)
- Arion (film) (1986) - (Gaia)
- Doraemon: Nobita's Fantastical Three Musketeers (1994) - (Voice)
- Crayon Shin-chan: Fierceness That Invites Storm! The Singing Buttocks Bomb (2007) - (Kinpa)
- Saint Young Men
- Gintama

=== Dubbing ===
- 10,000 BC (2011 TV Asahi edition) (Old Mother (Mona Hammond))
- Daddy Day Care (Miss Gwyneth Harridan (Anjelica Huston))
- Great Expectations (Ms. Nora Dinsmoor (Anne Bancroft))
- Super Mario Bros. (Lena (Fiona Shaw))
