= Sally the Witch =

1966 Japanese manga by Mitsuteru Yokoyama

- Screenshot of the 1966 anime adaptation

魔法使いサリー (Mahōtsukai Sarī)
- Genre: Magical girl
- Manga
- Written by: Mitsuteru Yokoyama
- Published by: Shueisha
- Magazine: Ribon
- Original run: July 1966 – October 1967
- Volumes: 1
- Anime television series
- Directed by: Toshio Katsuta; Hiroshi Ikeda
- Music by: Asei Kobayashi
- Studio: Toei Animation
- Original network: NET
- Original run: December 5, 1966 – December 30, 1968
- Episodes: 109 (list of episodes)
- Anime television series

Sally the Witch 2
- Directed by: Osamu Kasai
- Music by: Haruki Mino
- Studio: Toei Animation
- Original network: ANN (TV Asahi)
- Original run: October 9, 1989 – September 23, 1991
- Episodes: 88 (list of episodes)
- Anime film
- Directed by: Osamu Kasai
- Studio: Toei Animation
- Released: March 10, 1990
- Runtime: 27 minutes
- icon

Sally the Witch (Japanese: 魔法使いサリー, Hepburn: Mahōtsukai Sarī), originally titled Sunny the Witch (魔法使いサニー, Mahōtsukai Sanī), is a Japanese manga series written and illustrated by Mitsuteru Yokoyama. It was serialized in Shueisha's monthly Ribon magazine from July 1966 to October 1967. Its 1966 anime adaptation was one of the most popular magical girl series of what would eventually become a genre in Japan. Due to its characteristics, it may be considered the first shōjo anime as well; while titles such as Himitsu no Akko-chan predate Sally in manga form, the Sally anime predates Himitsu no Akko-chan's, which came out in 1969.

== Story ==
Sally is a 10 to 13 year old girl and is the princess of the "Land of Magic". One day, Sally moves to the "Human World" (Earth), despite facing reluctance from her parents, the King and Queen. There, she immediately befriends two schoolgirls – the tomboyish Yoshiko Hanamura and girly Sumire Kasugano – as she assumes the role of a human child and lives on Earth. She is soon joined by Cub, a resident of the Land of Magic, who requests to stay with Sally, and assumes the role of Sally's younger brother.

The first episode of the anime differs quite a bit from the initial chapters of the manga. There, after being scolded by her mother and reflecting on how bored she was, Sally decides to run away the "Human World" and explore, where she soon meets Yoshiko and Sumire after following them from a mall. The three soon become friends after fending off a couple of burglars thanks to the assistance of Cub (sent by the king to bring Sally back home), as Sally then decides to stay and live on Earth, alongside Cub staying with her to avoid the king's wrath.

Shared between the manga, the original anime adaptation and its sequel, Sally tries to keep her magical abilities a secret as she attempts to live the life of a human child, leading to mischief.

In the final episode of the anime, Sally's grandma informs her she must return to the Land of Magic. Before leaving, Sally tries to tell her friends about her origins, but no one will believe her. Her elementary school catches on fire, and Sally uses her magic to put it out. Her powers thus exposed, Sally's time to leave has finally come. She waves farewell to her friends, and returns to the Land of Magic.

== Characters ==
- Sally Yumeno (夢野サリー, Yumeno Sarī) (Voiced by: Michiko Hirai (1966), Yuriko Yamamoto (1989)): The main titular character, Sally is the daughter of the King and the Queen, being princess of the Land of Magic.
- Yoshiko Hanamura (花村よし子, Hanamura Yoshiko) (Voiced by: Midori Kato (1966), Teiyū Ichiryūsai (1989)):
  One of Sally's best friends in the mortal realm who is a tomboy.
- Sumire Kasugano (春日野すみれ, Kasugano Sumire) (Voiced by: Mariko Mukai (1966), Nana Yamaguchi (1989)):
  One of Sally's human friends who acts girly in contrast to Yoshiko.
- Cub (カブ, Kabu) (Voiced by: Sachiko Chijimatsu):
  Sally's magical, shape-changing assistant. He is a servant of the king and is sent by him in the anime to retrieve Sally and bring her home. Assuming the form of a five-year-old boy, Cub poses as Sally's younger brother. Cub is mischievous, usually playing pranks on Sally and friends or triggering unpredictable situations. However, his level of mischief has been on par with the Hanamura Triplets and Poron.
- The Hanamura Triplets: Tonkichi (花村トン吉, Hanamura Tonkichi), Chinpei (花村チン平, Hanamura Chinpei), and Kanta (花村カン太, Hanamura Kanta) (Voiced by: Masako Nozawa):
  Yoshiko's kid brothers.
- Poron (ポロン) (Voiced by: Fuyumi Shiraishi):
  An original character to the anime. She is a little witch girl who appears in the later part of series. Selfish and rather lovable, she frequently casts spells she cannot reverse, such as shrinking herself down to mouse-size and being unable to "grow up".
- Daimaō (大魔王, Great Magical King) (Voiced by: Kosei Tomita):
  Sally's paternal grandfather. An original character to the anime. He also wears a horned hairstyle similar to Sally's father. He has a magical horned staff, which Poron stole to cause mischief with Cub and the Hanamura triplets on Earth.
- Sally's Papa (Mr. Yumeno) (サリーのパパ, Sarī no Papa):
  The pompous ruler of the Land of Magic who dislikes humanity on principle.
- Sally's Mama (Mrs. Yumeno) (サリーのママ, Sarī no Mama) (Voiced by: Mariko Mukai (1966) Nana Yamaguchi (1989)):
  The friendly Queen of the Land of Magic who was previously known as Chima (シーマ, Shima) in the original manga.

== Release ==
Written and illustrated by Mitsuteru Yokoyama, Sally the Witch, was serialized in Shueisha's monthly Ribon magazine from July 1966 to October 1967. It was originally titled Sunny the Witch, before being changed as Sony owns the trademark to "Sunny". The series was inspired by the American TV sitcom, Bewitched (known in Japan as Oku-sama wa Majo, or The Missus is a Witch).

== Anime ==
=== Episode list ===
==== Sally the Witch (1966–1968) ====
Mahōtsukai Sally runs half hour per episode and has 109 episodes.

No.	Title	Original release date
1	"Here Comes the Cute Witch" "Kawaii Majo ga Yatte kita" (かわいい魔女がやってきた)	December 5, 1966
2	"Sally's Caretaker" "Sarī no Orusuban" (サリーのお留守番)	December 12, 1966
3	"Here Comes Santa Claus" "Santa Kurōsu ga Yatte kita" (サンタクロースがやってきた)	December 19, 1966
4	"The Wonderful Academy" "Suteki na Gakuen" (すてきな学園)	December 26, 1966
5	"The Kidnapping Group is a Great Excitement" "Yūkaidan wa Ōawate" (誘拐団は大あわて)	January 2, 1967
6	"The Ultra Grandmother" "Urutora Bāsan" (ウルトラ婆さん)	January 9, 1967
7	"Good Morning, Mr. Burgular" "Konnichi wa Dorobō-san" (こんにちは泥棒さん)	January 16, 1967
8	"The Magical Picnic" "Mahō no Pikunikku" (魔法のピクニック)	January 23, 1967
9	"Papa Is a Temperamental Person" "Papa wa Otenkiya" (パパはお天気や)	January 30, 1967
10	"Dreaming to Tomorrow" "Ashita ni Yume o" (あしたに夢を)	February 6, 1967
11	"Where Have Your Tears Gone?" "Namida-kun wa Doko ni iru" (涙くんはどこにいる)	February 13, 1967
12	"Prince of the Alley" "Yokochō no Ōji-sama" (横丁の王子様)	February 20, 1967
13	"A Malicious Test" "Ijiwaru Tesuto" (いじわるテスト)	February 27, 1967
14	"The Dream and the Specter" "Yume to Yūrei" (夢と幽霊)	March 6, 1967
15	"Number 0 Magical Subway" "Mahō no Chikatetsu 0 Gōsen" (魔法の地下鉄0号線)	March 13, 1967
16	"The Troublesome Freeloader" "Yakkai na Isōrō" (やっかいな居候)	March 20, 1967
17	"Sally and the Princess" "Sarī to Ōjo" (サリーと王女)	March 27, 1967
18	"Papa is Fake" "Papa wa Nisemono" (パパはにせもの)	April 3, 1967
19	"The Tomboy Drives" "Otenba Doraibu" (おてんばドライブ)	April 10, 1967
20	"Sunday's Gift" "Nichiyōbi no Okurimono" (日曜日のおくりもの)	April 17, 1967
21	"I Love my Mama" "Daisuki Mama" (大好きママ)	April 24, 1967
22	"The Cute Poppies" "Kawaī Popī" (かわいいポピー)	May 1, 1967
23	"Bow-wow Rebellion" "Wanwan Sōdō" (わんわん騒動)	May 8, 1967
24	"The Mysterious Haunted Mansion" "Nazo no Yūreikan" (謎の幽霊館)	May 15, 1967
25	"Grandfather's Birthday" "Ojīchama no Tanjōbi" (おじいちゃまの誕生日)	May 22, 1967
26	"The Magical Balloon Trip" "Mahō no Fūsen Ryokō" (魔法の風船旅行)	May 29, 1967
27	"The Cute Angel Comes Down" "Kawaii Tenshi ga Futte kita" (かわいい天使が降って来た)	June 5, 1967
28	"The Dreamful Ballerina" "Yume no Barerīna" (夢のバレリーナ)	June 12, 1967
29	"Implying Mistakes" "Shippai Darake" (失敗だらけ)	June 19, 1967
30	"The Mischievous School" "Itazura Gakkō" (いたずら学校)	June 26, 1967
31	"The Witch's Happiness" "Majo no Shiawase" (魔女のしあわせ)	July 3, 1967
32	"Sally of the Beach" "Umibe no Sarī" (海辺のサリー)	July 10, 1967
33	"Sally's Flower Bride" "Sarī no Hanayome-san" (サリーの花嫁さん)	July 17, 1967
34	"The Treasure of the Sea" "Umi no Takaramono" (海の宝物)	July 24, 1967
35	"The Specter Girl" "Yūrei Shōjo" (幽霊少女)	July 31, 1967
36	"Handshaking the Lion" "Raion to Akushu" (ライオンと握手)	August 7, 1967
37	"Tokyo Manga Avenue" "Tōkyō Manga Dōri" (東京マンガ通り)	August 14, 1967
38	"Naughty Admiral" "Wanpaku Taishō" (わんぱく大将)	August 21, 1967
39	"Funny Transfer Student" "Okashi na Tenkōsei" (おかしな転校生)	August 28, 1967
40	"Taro Kagikko" "Kagikko Tarō" (かぎっ子太郎)	September 4, 1967
41	"Become a Dog" "Yotchan Inu ni naru" (よっちゃんいぬになる)	September 11, 1967
42	"Magic Fortune-telling" "Mahō no Uranai" (魔法のうらない)	September 18, 1967
43	"Stuck Student" "Komatta Seito" (こまった生徒)	September 25, 1967
44	"I Saw Magic" "Mahō o Michatta" (魔法を見ちゃった)	October 2, 1967
45	"Doodle Car Parade" "Rakugaki Parēdo" (ラクガキパレード)	October 9, 1967
46	"Invisible Batch" "Mienai Batchi" (見えないバッチ)	October 16, 1967
47	"I Want to be a Witch" "Majo ni naritai" (魔女になりたい)	October 23, 1967
48	"Sally's Pinch" "Sarī no Pinchi" (サリーのピンチ)	October 30, 1967
49	"Circus girl" "Sākasu no Shōjo" (サーカスの少女)	November 6, 1967
50	"Bridge of True Heart" "Magokoro no Kakehashi" (まごころのかけ橋)	November 13, 1967
51	"Mom's Smell" "Okāchan no Nioi" (おかあちゃんの匂い)	November 20, 1967
52	"Good Luck, Sally" "Ganbare Sarī" (がんばれサリー)	November 27, 1967
53	"King of Lunch" "Kyūshoku no Ōsama" (給食の王様)	December 4, 1967
54	"Mr. Snowman" "Misutā Yukidaruma" (ミスター雪だるま)	December 11, 1967
55	"Friendship Christmas" "Yūjō no Kurisumasu" (友情のクリスマス)	December 18, 1967
56	"Rice Cake Riot" "Mochitsuki Sōdō" (もちつき騒動)	December 25, 1967
57	"Magic Naughty Threesome" "Mahō no Wanpaku Sanningumi" (魔法のわんぱく三人組)	January 1, 1968
58	"Goodbye, Bugs" "Tentorimushi yo Sayōnara" (点取虫よさようなら)	January 8, 1968
59	"Winter Mountain Events" "Fuyuyama no Dekigoto" (冬山のできごと)	January 15, 1968
60	"Pony Garden" "Ponī no Hanazono" (ポニーの花園)	January 22, 1968
61	"North Wind Child" "Kitakaze no Ko" (北風の子)	January 29, 1968
62	"Sally's Hometown" "Sarī no Furusato" (サリーのふるさと)	February 5, 1968
63	"Blue-eyed Friends" "Aoi Me no Otomodachi" (青い目のお友だち)	February 12, 1968
64	"Magic Sketchbook" "Mahō no Suketchibukku" (魔法のスケッチブック)	February 19, 1968
65	"Where is Your Brother?" "Onii-san wa Doko ni" (お兄さんはどこに)	February 26, 1968
66	"Old dog and girl" "Rōken to Shōjo" (老犬と少女)	March 4, 1968
67	"Naughty Strategy" "Itazura Daisakusen" (いたずら大作戦)	March 11, 1968
68	"Sally Goes a Lot" "Sarī Ōi ni Ikaru" (サリー大いにいかる)	March 18, 1968
69	"Magic April Fool's Day" "Mahō no Eipuriru Fūru" (魔法のエイプリルフール)	March 25, 1968
70	"Everyone Falls Apart" "Minna Barabara" (みんなバラバラ)	April 1, 1968
71	"Teacher's Bride" "Sensei no Hanayome-san" (先生の花嫁さん)	April 8, 1968
72	"Trial of the Magical Country" "Mahō no Kuni no Saiban" (魔法の国の裁判)	April 15, 1968
73	"Sally's Holiday" "Sarī no Kyūjitsu" (サリーの休日)	April 22, 1968
74	"Carp Streamer and Kashiwa-mochi" "Koinobori to Kashiwamochi" (鯉のぼりとカシワモチ)	April 29, 1968
75	"Putan the Bear Cub" "Koguma no Pūtan" (子ぐまのプータン)	May 6, 1968
76	"Pororon Angel" "Pororon Tenshi" (ポロロン天使)	May 13, 1968
77	"Little Witch" "Chīsana Mahōtsukai" (小さな魔法使い)	May 20, 1968
78	"Magic school festival" "Mahō no Gakuensai" (魔法の学園祭)	May 27, 1968
79	"Minimini Wife" "Minimini Oku-sama" (ミニミニ奥さま)	June 3, 1968
80	"Get Tomorrow's Weather" "Ashita Tenki ni Nāre" (あした天気になーれ)	June 10, 1968
81	"Sally's Photographer" "Sarī no Kameraman" (サリーのカメラマン)	June 17, 1968
82	"Fashionable Glasses" "Oshare Megane" (おしゃれメガネ)	June 24, 1968
83	"Jewel of Tears" "Namida no Hōseki" (涙の宝石)	July 1, 1968
84	"Ugly Doll" "Minikui Ningyō" (みにくい人形)	July 8, 1968
85	"Sunday School" "Nichiyō Gakkō" (日曜学校)	July 15, 1968
86	"Who is Princess Cinderella?" "Shinderera-hime wa Dare ka" (シンデレラ姫は誰か)	July 22, 1968
87	"Wings of Love" "Ai no Tsubasa" (愛のつばさ)	July 29, 1968
88	"Return the Playground" "Asobiba wo Kaese" (遊び場をかえせ)	August 5, 1968
89	"Hooray! Campifire" "Banzai! Kyanpufaiyā" (バンザイ!キャンプファイヤー)	August 12, 1968
90	"Goldfish and Wind Chimes" "Kingyo to Fūrin" (金魚と風鈴)	August 19, 1968
91	"The Memorial Tree of Farewell" "Wakare no Kinenju" (別れの記念樹)	August 26, 1968
92	"Secret Treasure" "Himitsu no Takaramono" (秘密の宝もの)	September 2, 1968
93	"Sally Disappeared" "Kieta Sarī" (消えたサリー)	September 9, 1968
94	"Spoiled Brat" "Itazurakko" (いたずらっ子)	September 16, 1968
95	"Run, Degoichi" "Hashire Degoichi" (走れデゴイチ)	September 23, 1968
96	"Little Child Uproar" "Chibikko Dai Sōdō" (ちびっ子大騒動)	September 30, 1968
97	"The Great Buddha who started walking" "Arukidashita Daibutsu-sama" (歩きだした大仏さま)	October 7, 1968
98	"Hooray! Olympics" "Banzai! Orinpikku" (バンザイ!オリンピック)	October 14, 1968
99	"Princess Kaguya of Sally" "Sally no Kaguya Hime" (サリーのかぐや姫)	October 21, 1968
100	"Hey, Oshou" "Horafuki Oshō-san" (ほらふき和尚さん)	October 28, 1968
101	"The Greatest Prank on Earth" "Chijō Saidai no Itazura" (地上最大のいたずら)	November 4, 1968
102	"Grandmother is Too Amazing" "Monosugoi Obā-san" (ものすごいお婆さん)	November 11, 1968
103	"Don't Give Up! Female Trio" "Makeru na! Sannin Musume" (負けるな!三人娘)	November 18, 1968
104	"Sally's Helper" "Sarī no Otetsudai-san" (サリーのお手伝いさん)	November 25, 1968
105	"The Best Magician" "Saigo no Majutsushi" (最後の魔術師)	December 2, 1968
106	"Maiko's Admiration" "Akogare no Maiko-san" (あこがれの舞妓さん)	December 9, 1968
107	"The Girl Who Stands on the Snowstrom" "Fubuki ni Tatsu Shōjo" (吹雪に立つ少女)	December 16, 1968
108	"Poron's Lullaby" "Poron no Komoriuta" (ポロンの子守唄)	December 23, 1968
109	"Goodbye, Sally" "Sayonara Sarī" (さよならサリー)	December 30, 1968

==== Sally the Witch 2 (1989–1991) ====
The second season runs half-hour per 88 episodes.

No.	Title	Original release date
1	"Nice to Meet You. I'm Sally Yumeno" "Hajimemashite, Atashi Yumeno Sarī desu" (はじめまして、あたし夢野サリーです)	October 9, 1989
2	"The Mischievous Poron's Riot!?" "Oshamana Poron no ōsōdō!?" (おしゃまなポロンの大騒動!?)	October 16, 1989
3	"The Fat Girl Next Door Who Ran Away From Home!?" "Iede shita Tonari no Futotta Ojōsama!?" (家出した隣の太ったお嬢様!?)	October 23, 1989
4	"I Love Class 5-3!" "Daisuki 5-nen 3-gumi!" (大好き 5年3組)	October 30, 1989
5	"Don't Go! Sumire" "Ikanaide! Sumire-chan" (行かないで！ すみれちゃん)	November 6, 1989
6	"I'm Sorry, Big Sister Sally" "Gomen-nasai, Sarī Oneechan" (ごめんなさい、サリーお姉ちゃん)	November 13, 1989
7	"Dad, Help!!" "Papa, Tasukete!!" (パパ、たすけて!!)	November 20, 1989
8	"Black Angel Karen" "Kuroi Tenshi Karen" (黒い天使カレン)	November 27, 1989
9	"Dreamy Pink Eel" "Yumemiru Pinku no Kujira-san" (夢見るピンクのクジラさん)	December 4, 1989
10	"A Lonely Young Man" "Sabishigariya no Obotchama" (さびしがり屋のお坊っちゃま)	December 11, 1989
11	"Santa Comes to Town!?" "Santa ga Machi ni Yatte kita!?" (サンタが街にやって来た!?)	December 18, 1989
12	"Snowy Zoo" "Yuki no Dōbutsuen" (雪の動物園)	January 8, 1990
13	"Lost Treasure" "Ushinawareta Takaramono" (失われた宝物)	January 15, 1990
14	"Dad and Grandpa's Big Fight" "Papa to Ojīchama no Ōgenka" (パパとおじいちゃまの大ゲンカ)	January 22, 1990
15	"Kabu is the Shiny First-Year Student!" "Kabu wa Pika-pika no Ichinensei!" (カブはピカピカの一年生！)	January 29, 1990
16	"Grandmother's Wonderful Ring" "Obasama no Suteki na Yubiwa" (おばさまの素敵な指輪)	February 5, 1990
17	"Poron's First Love" "Poron no Hatsukoi" (ポロンの初恋)	February 12, 1990
18	"The Fallen Star Prince" "Ochite Kita Hoshi no ōjisama" (落ちてきた星の王子様)	February 19, 1990
19	"Mother's Flower Garden" "Okāsan no Hanazono" (お母さんの花園)	February 26, 1990
20	"Foal Story: Birth of a Girl's Tears and Little Prayer!" "Kouma Monogatari: Shōjo no Namida to Chīsa na Inochi no Tanjō!" (子馬物語・少女の涙と小さな命の誕生！)	March 5, 1990
21	"Casting a Spell of Hatred: The Devil Child Again!" "Nikushimi no Jumon o Tonaete: Akuma-no-ko Futatabi!" (憎しみの呪文を唱えて・悪魔の娘再び！)	March 12, 1990
22	"A Twenty-year-old Secret Hidden in A Young Girl's Portrait" "Shōjo no Shōzōga ni Kakusareta Nijūnen Mae no Himitsu" (少女の肖像画に隠された二十年前の秘密)	March 19, 1990
23	"Sally is not Human!! Magic Test Riot" "Sarī wa Ningen ja nai!! Mahō Tesuto Sōdō" (サリーは人間じゃない!! 魔法テスト騒動)	April 9, 1990
24	"Flower Fairy World, Poron is the Naughty Princess" "Hana no Yōseikai, Poron wa Yancha na Ohimesama" (花の妖精界、ポロンはやんちゃなお姫様)	April 23, 1990
25	"The Witch's Curse Awakens From a 2,000-year Slumber!" "Nisennen no Nemuri kara Mezameta Majo no Noroi!" (二千年の眠りから目覚めた魔女の呪い！)	May 7, 1990
26	"Ghost? Vampire? The Forest Cries Every Night!" "Yūrei? Kyūketsuki? Yogoto ni Mori ga Naite iru!" (幽霊？吸血鬼？夜毎に森が泣いている！)	May 14, 1990
27	"Sally in Danger! Takuto's Lost Magic!!" "Sarī no Kiki! Ushinawareta Takuto no Maryoku!!" (サリーの危機！失われたタクトの魔力!!)	May 21, 1990
28	"Wish Upon a Star! Swan Lake Dances at Night!!" "Hoshi ni Negai o! Yozora ni Mau Hakuchō no Mizuumi!!" (星にねがいを！夜空に舞う白鳥の湖!!)	May 28, 1990
29	"Shine, Spica! The Love Tact is Revived Now!!" "Kagayake Supika! Ima, Ai no Takuto ga Yomigaeru!!" (輝けスピカ！今、愛のタクトが蘇る!!)	June 4, 1990
30	"Miraculous Magic Power! The Cat Became Human!?" "Kiseki no Maryoku Pawā! Ningen ni Natta Neko!?" (奇跡の魔力パワー！人間になったネコ!?)	June 11, 1990
31	"Kabu is a Master? The Fairy Sparrow's Gratitude" "Kabu ga Goshujin-sama!? Yōsei Suzume no Ongaeshi" (カブが御主人さま!?妖精スズメの恩返し)	June 18, 1990
32	"Believe in Friendship! SOS Communication from the Magical Kingdom!!" "Yūjō o Shinjite! Yume no Kuni kara SOS Tsūshin!!" (友情を信じて！夢の国からSOS通信!!)	June 25, 1990
33	"A Gift From the Fairy!? The Mystery of Twenty-Four Hours" "Yōsei kara no Okurimono!? Nijūyo-jikan no Fushigi" (妖精からの贈り物!?二十四時間の不思議)	July 2, 1990
34	"Surprising Weather: Yoshiko's First Love Typhoon" "Tenki mo Bikkuri: Yoshiko no Hatsukoi Taifūn" (天気もビックリ よし子の初恋タイフーン)	July 9, 1990
35	"Kabu is the Star Prince? The Star Story of the Flying Carriage" "Kabu wa Hoshi no ōjisama? Sora Tobu Basha no Hoshi Monogatari" (カブは星の王子様？空飛ぶ馬車の星物語)	July 16, 1990
36	"Summer Memories, White Dolphin and Mermaid Princess Sally" "Natsu no Omoide, Shiroi Iruka to Ningyohime Sarī" (夏の思い出、白いイルカと人魚姫サリー)	July 23, 1990
37	"Help Me! Sally's Shriek as She Shrinks" "Watashi o Tasukete! Chīsaku natta Sarī no Himei" (私を助けて！小さくなったサリーの悲鳴)	July 30, 1990
38	"Dabudabu is an Angel! Wonderful Knight's Star Story" "Dabudabu wa Tenshi! Suteki na Naito no Hoshi Monogatari" (ダブダブは天使！ステキな騎士（ナイト）の星物語)	August 6, 1990
39	"First Transformation Experience! Sally is a Golf Teacher!?" "Henshin Hatsutaiken! Sarī wa Gorufu no Sensei ni!?" (変身初体験！サリーはゴルフの先生に!?)	August 20, 1990
40	"Straw Hats and Sugar Cubes? The Big Thief is an Alien!" "Mugiwara Bōshi to Kakuzatō? Dai Dorobō wa Uchūjin!" (麦わら帽子と角砂糖？大泥棒は宇宙人！)	August 27, 1990
41	"Seek Through the Lost Magic: Prince of the Underworld Appears!" "Ushinatta Kioku o Motomete: Makai no Purinsu Tōjō!" (失った記憶を求めて 魔界の王子（プリンス）登場！)	September 3, 1990
42	"The Rabbit Gives 200 Years of Time Travel!" "Usagi ga Kureta Nihyakunen Kako no Taimu Toraberu!!" (ウサギがくれた二百年過去の時間旅行（タイムトラベル）!!)	September 10, 1990
43	"Put Your Wish Into Magic! The Bridge of Tears and Friendship" "Mahō ni Negai o Komete! Namida to Yūjō no Kakehashi" (魔法に願いを込めて！涙と友情のかけ橋)	September 17, 1990
44	"I Want Love! Princess Serene Cries from the Ice Kingdom" "Ai ga Hoshī! Kōri no Kuni no Purinsesu Serene no Sakebi" (愛が欲しい！氷の国の王女（プリンセス）セレネの叫び)	October 15, 1990
45	"Let Your Dreams Bloom! The Girls' Promise Across the Sea" "Yume o Sakasete! Umi o Koeta Shōjotachi no Chikai" (夢を咲かせて！海を越えた少女達の誓い)	October 22, 1990
46	"Where is it? Crayon Fairy's Little Autumn" "Doko ni aru no? Yōsei Kureyon no Chiisa na Aki" (どこにあるの？妖精クレヨンの小さな秋)	October 29, 1990
47	"Take Back Poron! Television is the Toy Box of Dreams" "Modotte Poron! Terebi wa Yume no Omochabako" (戻ってポロン！テレビは夢のオモチャ箱)	November 5, 1990
48	"Don't Cry, Cub! SOS From the Gold-Silver Kingdom" "Nakanaide Kabu! Kin to Gin no Kuni kara SOS" (泣かないでカブ！ 金と銀の国からSOS)	November 12, 1990
49	"Ibēru, the True Heart of Winter: Snowflakes Shining in the Morning Star" "Ibēru wa Fuyu no Magokoro Asahi ni Kagayaku Yuki no Kesshō" (イベールは冬の真心 朝日に輝く雪の結晶)	November 19, 1990
50	"Love Romance! Change the Future With Magic Dictionary" "Koi no Romansu! Mahō Jiten de Mirai o Kaete" (恋のロマンス！魔法辞典で未来を変えて)	November 26, 1990
51	"Moonlight Silhouette! Sally the Female Thief Runs" "Tsukiyo ni Shiruetto! Onna Kaitō Sarī ga Hashiru" (月夜にシルエット！女怪盗サリーが走る)	December 3, 1990
52	"Beyond the Starry Sky: Ride the Comet of Memories!!" "Hoshizora no Kanata: Omoide o Suisei ni Nosete!!" (星空のかなた 思い出を彗星に乗せて!!)	December 10, 1990
53	"Capture the Blue Sky With Mom's Memories in Your Chest!" "Aozora o Kiritotte! Mama no Omoide o Mune ni" (青空を切り取って！ママの思い出を胸に)	December 17, 1990
54	"Forbidden Fruit! The Tragedy of Mother and Daughter is Torn Apart!" "Kindan no Kajitsu! Hikisakareta Oyako no Higeki" (禁断の果実！引き裂かれた母娘の悲劇!!)	January 7, 1991
55	"Sally's First Love is the Prince Who Lost on Moon Dessert" "Sarī no Hatsukoi, Tsuki no Sabaku ni Kieta Purinsu" (サリーの初恋、月の砂漠に消えた王子（プリンス）!!)	January 14, 1991
56	"An Angel's Promise! The Love Between Girl and Raccoon Again" "Tenshi no Yakusoku! Shōjo to Araiguma no Ai Futatabi" (天使の約束！少女とアライグマの愛再び)	January 21, 1991
57	"Stop Time! The Goal of Friendship Fades in the Sunset" "Jikan yo Tomare! Yūhi ni Kasumu Yūjō Gōru" (時間よ止まれ！夕陽にかすむ友情ゴール)	January 28, 1991
58	"I Like It! Grandpa is a Real Wizard" "Daisuki! Ojīchama wa Gen'eki no Mahōtsukai" (大好き！おじいちゃまは現役の魔法使い)	February 4, 1991
59	"Dabudabu's Prayer! Don't Let Angel's Feather Disappear" "Dabudabu no Inori! Tenshi no Hane yo Kienaide" (ダブダブの祈り！天使の羽よ消えないで)	February 11, 1991
60	"Sally Gets Married!? The Hidden Secret in Glass Slipper" "Sarī ga Kekkon!? Garasu no Kutsu ni Kakureta Himitsu" (サリーが結婚!?ガラスの靴に隠れた秘密)	February 18, 1991
61	"Misunderstanding! A Tear That Calls Forth Spring" "Surechigau Omoiyari! Haru o Yobu Hitoshizuku no Namida" (すれ違う思いやり！春を呼ぶひと滴の涙)	February 25, 1991
62	"Run, Rainbow Train! The Two Light Thieves!?" "Hashire, Niji Ressha! Yukai na Hikari Dorobō ga Futari!?" (走れ虹列車！ゆかいな光泥棒が二人!?)	March 4, 1991
63	"Blue Sea Adventure! The Knight Rides a Dolphin" "Aoi Umi no Bōken! Naito wa Iruka ni Notte" (青い海の冒険！ナイトはイルカに乗って)	March 11, 1991
64	"Sumire's First Love! The Spring Breeze is the Melody of Violin" "Sumire no Hatsukoi! Harukaze wa Baiorin no Shirabe" (すみれの初恋！春風はバイオリンの調べ)	March 18, 1991
65	"A Rainbow in a Girl's Heart! Iris the Goddess of Wish" "Shōjo no Kokoro ni Niji o! Airisu wa Kibō no Megami" (少女の心に虹を！アイリスは希望の女神)	March 25, 1991
66	"Poron Runs Away!? Tearful Magic Kindergarten" "Poron ga Iede!? Namida Ippai no Mahō Yōchien" (ポロンが家出!?涙いっぱいの魔法幼稚園)	April 8, 1991
67	"The Boy Who Traveled Through Time! Seek Father's Memories" "Toki o Koeta Shōnen! Chichi no Omoide o Motomete" (時を越えた少年！父の思い出を求めて)	April 15, 1991
68	"Before Goodbye! Seascrapes That Reach a Girl's Heart" "Sayonara no Mae ni! Shōjo no Kokoro ni Todoku Umi Keshiki" (さよならの前に！少女の心に届く海景色)	April 22, 1991
69	"Big Chaos in the Human World? The Prank-loving Contrarian" "Ningen-kai wa Dai Konran? Itazura Daisuki Amanojaku" (人間界は大混乱!?いたずら大好き天邪鬼)	April 29, 1991
70	"In the Middle of a Dream! Tomboy Shelly has Arrived" "Yume no Naka! Otenba Sherī ga Yatte kita" (夢の中！おてんばシェリーがやってきた)	May 13, 1991
71	"Today's Smile! The Girl Who Wanted to be an Angel" "Bishō yo Kyō wa! Tenshi ni Naritakatta Shōjo" (微笑よ今日は！天使になりたかった少女)	May 20, 1991
72	"A Star is Born! Seek the Spotlight of Love" "Sutā Tanjō! Ai no Supottoraito o Motome" (スター誕生！愛のスポットライトを求め)	May 27, 1991
73	"Don't Touch Me! The Sad Boy Who Reads Love" "Boku ni Furenaide! Kokoro ga Yomeru Kanashī Shōnen" (僕に触れないで！心が読める悲しい少年)	June 3, 1991
74	"Sally's Magic has Disappeared! Sacred Forest Ritual" "Sarī no Mahō ga Kieta! Seinaru Mori no Gishiki" (サリーの魔法が消えた！聖なる森の儀式)	June 10, 1991
75	"Under the Girl Again! Stray Dog Bogey's Tears" "Mou Ichido Shōjo no Shita e! Sute Inu Bogī no Namida" (もう一度少女の下へ！捨て犬ボギーの涙)	June 17, 1991
76	"Please Tell Me!! My Dad is a Tailor!?" "Onegai Oshiete!! Watashi no Papa wa Uragirimono!?" (お願い教えて!!私のパパは裏切り者!?)	June 24, 1991
77	"Separation of Love and Sadness! Abandoned Fairy Papi" "Ai to Kanashimi no Wakare! Suterareta Yōsei Papi" (愛と哀しみの別離（わかれ）！捨てられた妖精パピ)	July 1, 1991
78	"The Legend of Light and Water! Fairy Papi's Life-threatening Magic" "Hikari to Mizu no Densetsu! Yōsei Papi Inochi o Kaketa Mahō" (光と水の伝説！妖精パピ命をかけた魔法)	July 8, 1991
79	"I Love Teacher! Cub's First Love for Tenma" "Sensei ga Daisuki! Tenma ni Takusu Kabu no Hatsukoi" (先生が大好き！天馬にたくすカブの初恋)	July 15, 1991
80	"Sumire in a Pinch! Be Strong Friendship Relay" "Sumire no Pinchi! Ganbare Yūjō Rirē" (すみれのピンチ！がんばれ友情リレー!!)	July 22, 1991
81	"Sally's House is Missing! Summer Night Mystery" "Sarī no Ie ga nai! Natsu no yo no Misuterī" (サリーの家がない！夏の夜のミステリー)	August 5, 1991
82	"Dabudabu's Bodyguard!? Save Genius Cat Baron" "Dabudabu no Yōjinbō!? Tensai Neko Baron o Sukue" (ダブダブは用心棒!?天才猫バロンを救え)	August 12, 1991
83	"A Childhood Dream That Lasts Forever! The Heavenly Maiden has Arrived" "Osanaki Yume yo Eien ni! Tennyo ga Machi e Yatte kita" (幼き夢よ永遠に！天女が街へやって来た)	August 19, 1991
84	"Stuffed Animal Love!? Dad and Mom's Youth Days" "Nuigurumi no Koi!? Papa to Mama Seishun no Hibi" (縫いぐるみの恋!?パパとママ青春の日々)	August 26, 1991
85	"Courageous Swear to the Stars! Cub's Tears are a Test for the Prince" "Hoshi ni Chikau Yūki! Kabu no Namida wa ōji e no Shiren" (星に誓う勇気！カブの涙は王子への試練)	September 2, 1991
86	"Premonition of Goodbye! The Girls Seek For the Blue Bird" "Sayonara no Yokan! Shōjo-tachi wa Aoi Tori o Motome" (サヨナラの予感！少女達は青い鳥を求め)	September 9, 1991
87	"Time to Say Goodbye! Sally's Decision to Pray to Virgo" "Wakare no Toki! Otomeza ni Inoru Sarī no Ketsui" (わかれの時！乙女座に祈るサリーの決意)	September 16, 1991
88	"Sally's Last Magic! The Oath of Friendship to the Stars" "Sarī Saigo no Mahō! Hoshi ni Chikau Towa no Yūjō" (サリー最後の魔法！星に誓う永遠（とわ）の友情)	September 23, 1991

== Legacy ==
Metropolitan Books author Robert Jay Lifton stated that Sally Yumeno "has long been one of the most popular of all manga and animation characters". In December 1994, police found a pamphlet at the headquarters of the Aum Shinrikyo cult which included a song titled "Sarin the Magician", a parody of the opening song of Sally the Witch with the lyrics changed to refer to the poison known as "sarin" which Aum Shinrikyo used during the attempted assassination of judges in a case against the cult in June 1994 and later in March 1995 when it carried out a terrorist attack on the Tokyo subway. Lifton said that Sally "was undoubtedly a prominent figure in the childhoods of leading Aum members."
