= Midori Katō =

Japanese actress, voice actress and narrator (born 1939)

- 加藤 みどり
- Born: 15 November 1939 (age 86); Tokyo Prefecture, Empire of Japan
- Occupations: Actress; voice actress; narrator
- Years active: 1964–present
- Notable work: Sazae-san as Sazae Fuguta; Sally the Witch as Yoshiko Hanamura; Osomatsu-kun (1966) as Osomatsu Matsuno

Midori Katō (加藤 みどり, Katō Midori; born November 15, 1939) is a Japanese actress, voice actress, and narrator who is most famous for the role of Sazae Fuguta from the long-running family anime Sazae-san. She is also known for voicing Yoshiko in Sally the Witch and Osomatsu Matsuno in Osomatsu-kun (1966).

== Biography ==
=== Early life and career ===
Midori Katō was born Midori Itō (伊藤 みどり, Itō Midori) on 15 November 1939 in Tokyo Prefecture, which would later become Tokyo Metropolis four years after her birth, in the Empire of Japan. She was educated at Toyotama High School in Suginami ward and Shochiku Music and Dance School, the now-defunct school of the Shōchiku Revue troupe. She originally wanted to be an actress in shinpa, but she was unable to perform any of the required arts, and she expected that it would change if it was taught at a low price. Several of the students she was in the same graduating class with included actresses Chieko Baisho and Hiromi Sakaki.

In 1959, the Japanese national broadcasting organization NHK was recruiting tarento for television, and Katō subsequently moved the NHK's actor training school. The following year in April 1960, she made her broadcast debut in NHK's Tenshi no Heya, and in the same year, she was also the founder of a theatrical troupe called "Sanju Jinkai". She was also a member of three voice acting offices: Gekidankawa the Tokyo Actor's Consumer's Cooperative Society, and Sigma Seven.

After the expiration of her three-year priority contract with NHK, Katō met a producer at Toei Animation and started her career as a voice actor in anime television. She voiced the titular character of Osomatsu-kun, Yoshiko Hanamura in Sally the Witch, and Kan-chan in The Genie Family. She also performed the song in a commercial for Meiji Milk Chocolate (a chocolate bar manufactured by Meiji Dairies) that is best known for the Chocolate wa Meiji phrase.

=== Sazae-san ===
It takes six months to make one anime. The people at the site carefully draw and make one by one. If you, the protagonist, are working around here and there, people on the ground will not work for you.

— Miki Matsumoto, the then-producer of Sazae-san, to Katō after the latter received the role of Sazae Fuguta.

In 1968, Katō was cast as the titular character of Sazae-san, Sazae Fuguta. She participated at the audition with the intent to audition for another character, Katsuo Isono, and wanted to voice him and Sazae, but it was vetoed. She was asked to step down from all other anime work, and no longer played any anime characters other than Sazae. Although the series is now long-running, Katō would later recall in 2009 that she initially thought it would last only three months.

For about 10 years since the broadcast started, Katō played freely and ad libitum, but later decided to use scripts after self-reflecting that the scriptwriters are not actors if they are not writing every word. This was because Kazue Takahashi, who was the second voice actor of Katsuo, was able to do his words perfectly without being affected by Kato's ad libitum acting.

During the fifteenth anniversary of Sazae-san around 1984, Katō had an opportunity to meet the writer of the original Sazae-san manga, Machiko Hasegawa. Katō told Hasegawa, "Sensei, watashi, this year, it's just bad", and Hasegawa told her, "I'm sure there's something good to come". This was the only time Katō ever met Hasegawa before the latter's death on 27 May 1992.

In 2009, Katō and her Sazae-san co-star Ichirō Nagai made brief cameo appearances in the fourth live-action adaptation of Sazae-san, Katō appearing as a female employee. Katō told Oricon Style that she had not appeared in drama for the past 45 years and felt nervous during her appearance.

She was invited to the En'yūkai held on 25 October 2012, where she exchanged words with then-Emperor Akihito and Empress Michiko. Kato introduced herself as "Sazae", believing that she would be recognized with just the nameplate, and the Emperor and Empress responded with a smile. After the Crown Prince Naruhito and his younger brother the Prince Akishino said that they were watching Sazae-san, Kato said "Dad, mom, I'm thrilled, I don't want to go home anymore. Officials from the Imperial Household Agency reported that Aiko, Princess Toshi was able to recognize Katō's voice as Sazae's.

In 2013 Guinness World Records recognized Sazae-san as the longest running animated series, surpassing The Simpsons which went on air in 1989. On 6 October 2019, Katō and fellow Sazae-san voice actor Takako Sasuga were recognized by Guinness World Records in the category of "longest career as a voice actor for the same character in an animated television series", having at that point voiced their characters for 50 years and 1 day.

With the death of Takako Sasuga in 2023, Kato became the only cast member to continue appearing in the series since the first episode, making her the oldest. 2024 saw her break her own Guinness World Record. In an interview with The New York Times, she predicted that she would continue to voice-act "as long as I'm healthy and alive", and revealed that she does not drink or smoke and does not stay out late at night for her role as Sazae.

=== Other work ===
In 1989, Katō began performing on her own stage, receiving a request from a producer of a television station who watched the stage.

Katō was also the narrator of Makeover! Dramatic Before & After, a documentary series which aired on TV Asahi. The series' selection in the 2003 "New Word / Buzzword Awards" earned her an appearance at an award ceremony there.

Katō was awarded the 45th Anniversary Special Prize by the Broadcast Woman Prize in 2015.

== Filmography ==
=== Anime ===
- Shōnen Ninja Kaze no Fujimaru (1964) – Midori, Mika
- Osomatsu-kun (1966) – Osomatsu-kun (episodes 1 and 2)
- Sally the Witch (1966) – Yoshiko Hanamura, Ultra Bā-san
- Tobidase! Bacchiri (1966) – Benmatsu
- Kaminaribō ya Pikkari Bi (1967) – Pontarō
- Pyunpyunmaru (1967) – Chibimaru
- Dokachin the Primitive Boy (1968) – Pak
- Fight Da!! Pyūta (1968)
- Yuuyake Banchō (1968) – Chuji Akagi
- Sazae-san (1969) – Sazae Fuguta
- Hakushon Daimaou (1969) – Kan-chan
- Mōretsu Atarō (1969) – Dekoppachi,
- Itazura Tenshi Chippo-chan (1970)

=== TV drama ===
- Fushigi'na Pack (1960, voice)
- Oyako (1960)
- Tenshi no heya (1960), Yōko Harada
- Nōfu arite (1961)
- Speed Jidai episode 1 "Speed no miryoku" (1963)
- Tegami no Onna (1963)
- Docchi ga docchi (1972)
- Wild 7 (1972-1973, episodes 1, 2, 3 and 9)
- Ganbare!! Robocon (1974-1976) – Mama/Shoko Oyama
- Dakara Seishun: Naki Mushikōshien (1983)
- Nihon no On'na Series II: Haru no Kage (1981)
- Watashi no Kawaii Hito (1986)
- Sazae-san (2009) – Namihei's co-worker

=== Puppetry ===
- Uriko Himeko: Nippon Mukashibanashi (1978, voice)
- Ōsama no Mimi wa Roba no Mimi: Girisha Shinwa yori (1999, voice)
