= Wandering Sun =

Japanese manga series

さすらいの太陽 (Sasurai no Taiyō)
- Genre: Drama, music
- Manga
- Written by: Keisuke Fujikawa
- Illustrated by: Mayumi Suzuki
- Published by: Shogakukan
- Magazine: Shōjo Comic
- Original run: August 1970 – August 1971
- Volumes: 4
- Anime television series
- Directed by: Chikao Katsui
- Studio: Mushi Productions
- Original network: Fuji Television
- Original run: April 8, 1971 – September 30, 1971
- Episodes: 26

Wandering Sun (さすらいの太陽, Sasurai no Taiyō), also known as Nozomi in the Sun, is a Japanese manga series written by Keisuke Fujikawa and illustrated by Mayumi Suzuki. It also received an anime adaptation by Mushi Productions which ran for 26 episodes in 1971. Both Yoshiyuki Tomino and Yoshikazu Yasuhiko were involved in the production of Wandering Sun, and would later again collaborate on the ground-breaking and genre-defining series Brave Raideen and Mobile Suit Gundam. The anime toned down some of the more intense and mature elements of the manga for a prime-time TV audience.

Wandering Sun tells the story of two girls switched at birth by the nurse Michiko, who has a grudge against the wealthy. Miki was born in the poor Mine family but is switched into the rich Koda clan, and Nozomi the opposite. Fate cannot separate the two girls who compete to become successful singers after meeting at high school, with the girl-next-door Nozomi working hard and on her own to be the best pop singer in Japan and the rich girl Miki using her family's status to reach the same goal.

This series was itself a ground-breaker in that it was perhaps the first anime series to depict the entertainment industry—specifically popular music, and that would popularize the future concept of Japanese idols which would be a major plot point in many anime to come from Macross, Creamy Mami and Perfect Blue until the Love Live series. The TV series was also released in Italy under the title Jane e Micci and in France as Nathalie et ses Amis.

== Main characters ==
Nozomi Mine (峰 のぞみ) Voiced by: Junko Fujiyama
The kind and hardworking daughter of a poor oden stall owner. She was taking night classes so she could work as a waitress to support her family. Nozomi transfers to a regular school thanks to her sponsor, Michiko Nohara. She composes an original song, "Song of the Heart" which touches everyone nationwide. Her birthday is April 12.
Miki Koda (香田美紀) Voiced by: Kiyomi Kadena and Michiko Hirai
The snotty daughter of the Koda family conglomerate. She receives harassing phone calls and messages around the time Nozomi transferred to her school. While her father is a kind man, her mother is as cold and calculating as she is. Her birthday is April 12.
Fanny (ファニー) Voiced by: Makio Inoue

A handsome young man and Nozomi's love interest. He is actually the long lost son of the Mine family.

Kumagoro (熊五郎) Voiced by: Kōsei Tomita

A friend to the Mine family.

Michiko Nohara (野原道子) Voiced by: Ryōko Kinomiya

A deranged woman who hates the wealthy due to her rough upbringing. She does anything possible to make Nozomi suffer. Her younger brother is a famous lyricist.

- Tesuya Asado as Isao Egawa
- Koichi Noda as Jun Nohara
- Mitsuko Aso as Tsune
- Kinpei Azusa as Shinsuke Mine
- Miyoko Asō as Shizuko Mine
- Takako Kondo as Kazuo Mine
- Waka Tachibana as Yuki Mine
- Osamu Kobayashi as Daijiro
- Ikuo Nishikawa as Yumemaro
- Takeshi Aono as Akira Nitta

== Staff ==
- Original creator: Keisuke Fujikawa, Mayumi Suzuki
- Script: Keisuke Fujikawa, Shun'ichi Yukimuro
- Character designs: Yoshikazu Yasuhiko
- Storyboards: Yoshiyuki Tomino
- Music: Hideki Fuyuki
- Producer: Hiroshi Saito, Noboru Katano
- Production: Mushi Production, Fuji TV
