= Tensai Bakabon =

Manga and anime

- The cover of Tensai Bakabon volume 2

天才バカボン
- Genre: Comedy
- Manga
- Written by: Fujio Akatsuka
- Published by: Kodansha; Shogakukan
- Magazine: Weekly Shōnen Magazine; (April 9, 1967–February 23, 1969, June 27, 1971–January 12, 1975, October 26, 1975–December 5, 1976); Monthly Shōnen Magazine; (August 1967–January 1969, August 1974–December 1978); Weekly Shōnen Sunday; (August 24, 1969–April 5, 1970); Shōnen Sunday Deluxe; (September 1969–June 1970); Weekly Bokura Magazine; (May 10, 1971–May 31, 1971); Monthly TV Magazine; (December 1971–August 1977); Comic BonBon; (October 1987–October 1991); Hero Magazine; (October 1989–January 1991); Bom Bom Deluxe; (November 1991–December 1992)
- Original run: April 9, 1967 – December 5, 1976 (Shōnen Magazine version)
- Volumes: 38
- Anime television series
- Directed by: Hiroshi Saito
- Music by: Takeo Watanabe
- Studio: Tokyo Movie
- Original network: NNS (YTV)
- Original run: September 25, 1971 – June 24, 1972
- Episodes: 40
- Anime television series

Ganso Tensai Bakabon
- Directed by: Yoshio Takeuchi; Makura Saki; Shigetsugu Yoshida; Hideo Takayashiki
- Written by: Yutaka Kaneko; Noboru Shiroyama; Haruya Yamazaki; Atsushi Yamatoya
- Music by: Takeo Watanabe
- Studio: Tokyo Movie
- Original network: NNS (NTV)
- Original run: October 6, 1975 – September 26, 1977
- Episodes: 103
- Anime television series

Heisei Tensai Bakabon
- Directed by: Hiroshi Sasagawa
- Studio: Studio Pierrot
- Original network: FNS (Fuji TV)
- Original run: January 6, 1990 – December 29, 1990
- Episodes: 46
- Anime television series

Rerere no Tensai Bakabon
- Directed by: Hayato Date
- Studio: Studio Pierrot
- Original network: TXN (TV Tokyo)
- Original run: October 19, 1999 – March 21, 2000
- Episodes: 24
- Anime television series

Shinya! Tensai Bakabon
- Directed by: Horu Tokozawa
- Produced by: Koji Fuji; Kazuyoshi Ozawa; Makoto Hijikata; Genta Ozaki; Takayoshi Minematsu; Izumi Furusawa; Tomoyuki Saito
- Written by: Horu Tokozawa
- Music by: Kenichiro Suehiro; Akihiro Manebe
- Studio: Studio Pierrot+
- Licensed by: Crunchyroll
- Original network: TV Tokyo, TVO, TVA, BS TV Tokyo
- Original run: July 11, 2018 – September 26, 2018
- Episodes: 12

Tensai Bakabon (天才バカボン; lit. 'Genius Bakabon') (Note: The official English name was Meet the Boneheads, but has since been favored for the more accurate The Genius Bakabon.) is a Japanese manga series written and illustrated by Fujio Akatsuka, which began publication on April 9, 1967, in Weekly Shōnen Magazine. It is about the misadventures of a dim-witted boy (Bakabon) and his idiotic father, the latter of whom eventually becomes the central character.

It has been adapted into five anime television series. The first two series produced by Tokyo Movie were broadcast in the 1970s for 40 and 103 episodes respectively. The third and fourth series were produced by Studio Pierrot and broadcast in 1990 and 1999–2000, for 46 and 24 episodes respectively. The fifth series was produced by Pierrot+ and broadcast for 12 episodes in 2018.

== Plot ==
The series is episodic, though many concepts from chapters carry through into plots. Initially, the series begins with Bakabon and his Papa left home alone as Mama is in the hospital under prolonged second-stage childbirth with Bakabon's little brother, Hajime. After the birth, the family discovers that the extended time spent in the womb has granted Hajime accelerated intelligence, leading to many milestones in development met in his first few months of life, including talking, walking, reading, and mathematical comprehension.

After this initial storyline, the series pivots to more nonsensical, satirical stories about Papa, Bakabon, and the various others in the neighborhood. Recurring stories include:

- Papa meets with a former classmate from his alma mater, Bakada University, who has a strange problem that Papa helps solve, usually in his own dangerous, life-threatening way.
- Papa gets involved with a science experiment (typically one from a Bakada colleage), with disastrous results.
- Papa has a hair-brained idea, leading to trouble with the Police Officer.
- A flashback story, usually involving a member of the family or somebody in town.
- A complete non-sequitur story, involving no familiar characters and starring one-off protagonists.

Unlike its Akatsuka contemporary Osomatsu-kun, the series is relatively grounded in its stories, with significantly less genre parodies than the former. As Osomatsu-kun would focus on placing its characters in a completely different setting outside of its established, usually contemporary suburban world, such as a jidaigeki period drama or a Wild West story, Bakabon instead framed such parodies as dreams, one-offs involving new characters in an unfamiliar locale, or within typical chapters.

== Characters ==
Bakabon's Papa (バカボンのパパ, Bakabon no Papa)
Voiced by: Masashi Amenomori (1st-2nd series), Kōsei Tomita (3rd series, pachinko games), Hisahiro Ogura (4th series), Arata Furuta (5th series)
Bakabon's troublemaking father who eventually steals the show and becomes the central character. His catchphrase is "koredeiinoda (これでいいのだ, that's the way it should be)", usually used as a closing remark at the end of a chapter. Papa was a philosophy major at Bakada University (バカ田大学, Bakada Daigaku), a school enrolling only the most idiotic students in the world. It is often shown that Papa is either too stupid to perform a simple task or instead comes up with some crazy idea to accomplish a simple chore, usually asking for his son Bakabon's advice and causing tons of trouble. He was once very smart but became an idiot after an accident as a child. He is known for always wearing his trademark hachimaki and haramaki. His favorite food is octopus. Papa has become an anime icon in Japan and was ranked number 9 in a 2002 TV Asahi Top 100 Anime Characters list.
Bakabon (バカボン)
Voiced by: Keiko Yamamoto (1st-2nd series, pachinko), Megumi Hayashibara (3rd series), Yoshiko Kamei (4th series), Miyu Irino (5th series)
A boy who enjoys causing mischief, especially with his Papa. Though he gets caught up in various crazy scenarios due to his empty head, he means the best and is a kind, sensitive boy. He is known for not wearing pants underneath his kimono, though this was initially not the case. At the beginning of the series he attends Bokenasu Elementary School (坊毛茄子小学校, Bokenasu Shōgakkō), which means Idiot Elementary School, but by the fourth anime it has been renamed Bakada Elementary School (バカ田小学校, Bakada Shōgakkō), putting it in line with his father's alma mater.
Hajime-chan (ハジメちゃん)
Voiced by: Takako Sasuga (1st-2nd series, pachinko), Chika Sakamoto (3rd series), Yukiji (4th series), Ai Nonaka (5th series)
Bakabon's younger brother. He is a child prodigy, understanding words almost immediately after his birth and being capable of explaining the Pythagorean theorem and Kepler's laws of planetary motion. His name means "beginning".
Bakabon's Mama (バカボンのママ, Bakabon no Mama)
Voiced by: Eiko Masuyama (1st-4th series), Haruko Kitahama (1st series, Ep. 35 only), Noriko Hidaka (5th series)
Bakabon's mother and a graduate of Kuroyuri Women's University (黒百合女学園, Kuroyuri Jogakuen) (a parody of Shirayuri Women's University). Despite how much trouble and mischief Papa and Bakabon cause, she is a good wife and mother. She is the only family member to have the same voice actress throughout the series created when Akatsuka was alive.
Rerere no Oji-san (レレレのおじさん, Mister "Rerere")
Voiced by: Ryūji Saikachi (1st-2nd series), Shigeru Chiba (3rd-4th series, pachinko), Akira Ishida (5th series)
The Bakabon family's odd neighbor, named so for his tendency to say "rerere" (rather than are (あれ)) when confused about the countless shenanigans in the series. He is almost always seen sweeping the street outside of his yard, a habit he retained after being a father to a ludicrous amount of children. He is bald, has a moustache but no nose, ears that extend slightly off of his head, and wears a yukata and geta sandals.
Omawari-san (お巡りさん)
Voiced by: Isamu Tanonaka (1st series), Kaneta Kimotsuki (2nd series), Shigeru Chiba (3rd-4th series, pachinko), Toshiyuki Morikawa (5th anime)
The local unnamed beat cop, referred to as Honkan-san (本官さん; lit. 'Mr. Policeman') in the anime. He is gluttonous, lecherous, and often fires his pistol at random. He is always wishing for money or a promotion. His notable features include his huge eyes, usually drawn as connected into one eyeball, his underbite buck teeth (from the jawbone), and his one nostril in the middle of his nose. His official name from Akatsuka is Mentama Tsunagari Omawari-san (目ン玉つながりのおまわりさん, The Officer with the Connected Eyes), though there have been other instances of a more "normal" name as a joke.
Unagi-Inu (ウナギイヌ, Eel-dog)
Voiced by: Michihiro Ikemizu (2nd series), Aruno Tahara (3rd series), Kōzō Shioya (4th series), Takahiro Sakurai (5th anime)
An unusual amphibious animal from the neighborhood who is the son of both an eel and a dog. His skin is slippery-smooth like his mother's, but travels on four legs like his father. Runs afoul of the Officer, who plans to have him as a meal. Lives in a partly-submerged doghouse with his parents.
Dog of Night (夜のいぬ, Yoru no Inu)
A goofy bulldog who shows up against a contrasting realistic backdrop in scene transitions to indicate the passage of time from day to night.

=== Minor characters ===
Kumada-kun (熊田くん)
Voiced by: Rica Matsumoto (3rd series), Kappei Yamaguchi (4th series)
Bakabon's classmate who always wears a helmet. For the 4th anime he was renamed Osamu Tezuka-buto (手塚ブト 治, Tezukabuto Osamu; "kabuto" means "helmet").
Norauma (ノラウマ, "Stray Horse"/"Wild Horse")
A reckless horse with no owner. He is a talented writer and caligrapher, with a passion for creating artwork using his hoofprints. When angry, he will shoot faeces out of his rectum like a cannon.
Honda-sensei (凡田先生)
Voiced by: Kōichi Kitamura
Bakabon's headmaster. Only appears in the first anime.
Nakamura-kun (中村くん)
Voiced by: Kaneta Kimotsuki
Bakabon's ill-tempered classmate. Only appears in the first anime.

=== Characters from Akatsuka's other titles ===
Iyami (イヤミ)
Voiced by: Kaneta Kimotsuki (Episodes 1, 4, 16); Kenichi Ogata (Episodes 3, 6, 11, 16, 20-21, 24) (4th series)
Originally from Osomatsu-kun, he only appears in the Rerere no Tensai Bakabon series alongside Chibita.
Chibita (チビ太)
Originally from Osomatsu-kun, he only appears in the Rerere no Tensai Bakabon series alongside Iyami.
Hatabō (ハタ坊; lit. "Flag boy")
Originally from Osomatsu-kun, he only appears in the Rerere no Tensai Bakabon series.
Dekapan (デカパン)
Originally from Osomatsu-kun, he only appears in the Rerere no Tensai Bakabon series.
Dayōn (ダヨーン)
Originally from Osomatsu-kun, he only appears in the Rerere no Tensai Bakabon series.
Sakura-chan (さくらちゃん)
Voiced by: Kazuko Sawada
Originally from Kikanpo Gen-chan. Bakabon's girlfriend. Only appears in the first anime.

== Media ==
=== Manga ===
4 bilingual Japanese-English volumes have been released of the manga as The Genius Bakabon.

=== Anime ===
Four anime series have been produced, with the first two series produced by Tokyo Movie Shinsha and the second two produced by Studio Pierrot. Tensai Bakabon (天才バカボン; "Genius Bakabon") aired for 40 episodes on Yomiuri TV from September 25, 1971, to June 24, 1972. Three years later, Ganso Tensai Bakabon (元祖天才バカボン; "Original Genius Bakabon") aired for 103 episodes on NTV from October 6, 1975, to September 26, 1977. In India this show was broadcast by Hungama TV.

The original series was heavily rerun on Animax during its first few years on air, as it was centred around classic anime at the time.

The two Studio Pierrot series aired nearly nine years apart, with Heisei Tensai Bakabon (平成天才バカボン; "Heisei period Genius Bakabon") airing on Fuji TV for 46 episodes from January 6 to December 29, 1990, and Rerere no Tensai Bakabon (レレレの天才バカボン; "Rerere's Genius Bakabon") airing on TV Tokyo from October 19, 1999, to March 21, 2000, for 24 episodes. A late night anime titled Shinya! Tensai Bakabon (深夜！天才バカボン, "Late Night! Genius Bakabon") premiered on July 10, 2018, on TV Tokyo and other channels. It ran for 12 episodes.

=== Video games ===
A video game based on Tensai Bakabon titled Heisei Tensai Bakabon (平成天才バカボン) was released for the Nintendo Famicom by Namco on December 6, 1991. A Game Boy version was released later on February 28, 1992.
