= Osomatsu =

Osomatsu may refer to:

- Osomatsu-kun, a 1962 Japanese manga series
- Osomatsu-kun: Hachamecha Gekijō, a 1988 video game based on the manga
- Mr. Osomatsu, a 2015 anime series based on the manga
  - List of Mr. Osomatsu episodes
