= Mari Yokoo =

Japanese voice actress (born 1952)

- 横尾 まり
- Born: Mari Akiya (秋谷 真理); February 21, 1952 (age 74); Tokyo, Japan
- Occupations: Voice actress; narrator
- Years active: 1980–present
- Agent: Sigma Seven
- Notable credits: Shirobako as Mari Tateo; Osomatsu-kun as Ichimatsu Matsuno and Matsuyo Matsuno; Food Wars! Shokugeki no Soma as Fumio Daimido; Doraemon as Mrs. Honekawa; Terminator Zero as The Prophet; Skip and Loafer as Mitsumi's Grandma; Gangsta as Big Mama; Mobile Suit Gundam F91 as Leahlee Edaberry; The Jungle Book as Luri; Macross 7 as Alice Holiday; Heavy Object as Ayami Cherryblossom; Tales of Berseria as Tabitha Baskerville; Mobile Fighter G Gundam as Nastasha Zabigov; Train to the End of the World as Capybara
- Website: Official profile

Mari Akiya (秋谷 真理, Akiya Mari; née Yokoo, born February 21, 1952) known professionally as Mari Yokoo (横尾 まり, Yokoo Mari) is a Japanese voice actress affiliated with Sigma Seven.

She is best known for her roles as Mari Tateo in Shirobako, Ichimatsu Matsuno and Matsuyo Matsuno in Osomatsu-kun, Fumio Daimido in Food Wars! Shokugeki no Soma, Mrs. Honekawa in Doraemon, The Prophet in Terminator Zero, Mitsumi's Grandma in Skip and Loafer, Big Mama (Georgiana) in Gangsta, Leahlee Edaberry in Mobile Suit Gundam F91, Luri in The Jungle Book, Alice Holiday in Macross 7, Ayami Cherryblossom in Heavy Object, Tabitha Baskerville in Tales of Berseria, Nastasha Zabigov in Mobile Fighter G Gundam, and Capybara (Kazuyo) in Train to the End of the World.

== Biography ==
Born in Tokyo, Japan on February 21, 1952, Yokoo started working in anime and dubbing after graduating from the training school of Theater Echo.

Having been previously affiliated with Mausu Promotion and Production Baobab, Yokoo has been affiliated with Sigma Seven since 1997.

Yokoo studied the art of storytelling under Yae Kamata and from 2002 to 2011, served as a member of the "Goza" reading theater-group, led by actor Daisuke Maki. She teaches and instructs the next generation of voice actors and narrators at the Sigma Seven Voice Acting Academy, the Yomiuri Nippon Television Culture Center Omori, and the Shin-Urayasu Culture Center.

She has made reading novels aloud her life's work and continues to hold reading performances.

== Personal life ==
Her personal hobbies are skiing and swimming. She owns a pet Chihuahua named Anzu.

=== Features ===
Yokoo is known for having a "strangely emotionless" voice.

She is known for portraying mother character roles and frequently serves as the hostess for events like fashion shows. One of her voice acting roles was voicing Suneo Honekawa's mom Mrs. Honekawa in the television anime series Doraemon from 1991 to 2005.

== Filmography ==
=== Television animation ===
- Astro Boy (1980): Osamu (Eps. 4, 17-19, and 44), Child (Ep. 22), Child A (Ep. 25), Lady (Ep. 26), Art Teacher (Ep. 30), Stewardess (Ep. 40), Boy (Ep. 45), Boy 2 (Ep. 49)
- The New Adventures of Gigantor (1980): Additional voice (Eps. 3, 22, and 27)
- Yattodetaman (1981): Jujakuputer
- Urusei Yatsura (1981): Additional voice
- Galaxy Cyclone Braiger (1981): Jacqueline
- Ninja Hattori-kun (1981): Additional voice
- Miss Machiko (1981): Additional voice
- Gyakuten! Ippatsuman (1982): Piiko, Gym, Haru's Mother (Ep. 18), Retty, Reception, Woman B, Orokabu
- Combat Mecha Xabungle (1982): Elchi Cargo
- The Call of the Wild (1982): Additional voice
- Space Adventure Cobra (1982): Receptionist (Ep. 1)
- Sarutobi the Wonder Ninja (1982): Maki
- Itadakiman (1983): Mother (Ep. 4), Orokabu
- Cat's Eye (1983): Reika Kuramoto (Ep. 25), Fake Cat's Eye
- Aura Battler Dunbine (1983): Musy Poe, Jeryl's Mother
- Mīmu Iro Iro Yume no Tabi (1983): Additional voice
- Glass Mask (1984): Emi Kanaya (Eps. 17 and 19)
- Panzer World Galient (1984): Chururu's Mother (Eps. 2–3, 9, 11, and 14), Lorna
- Doraemon (1984): Hoi's Mother (Ep. 776), Mrs. Honekawa (Second voice)
- Video Warrior Laserion (1984): Sofia
- Wing-Man (1984): The Shiva/Rei Mizuno
- Sherlock Hound (1984): Maria
- Blue Comet SPT Layzner (1985): Mill Julia Asuka Albatro
- Onegai! Samia-don (1985): Additional voice
- High School! Kimengumi (1985): Kayo Oba
- Animated Classics of Japanese Literature (1986): Sally
- Maison Ikkoku (1986): Additional voice
- Anmitsu Hime (1986): Monster Queen
- Bug tte Honey (1986): Patras
- Mami the Psychic (1987): Tsutomu's Mother, Yasuko (Ep. 41), Housewife (Ep. 55)
- Tsuide ni Tonchinkan (1987): Female Detective
- Transformers: The Headmasters (1987): Queen
- Mister Ajikko (1987): Noriko Ajiyoshi, Hot Wheels, Ryoko
- City Hunter (1987): Yōko
- Ulysses 31 (1988): Silka
- Osomatsu-kun (1988): Matsuyo Matsuno, Ichimatsu Matsuno, Grandmother, Shinjimattadar (Eps. 14, 44, and 85), Additional voice
- What's Michael? (1988): Additional voice
- Akuma-kun (1989): Isis
- The Adventures of Hutch the Honeybee (1989): Queen, Yashame, Omiki
- The New Adventures of Kimba the White Lion (1989): Mrs. Gina
- The Jungle Book (1989): Luri
- Ranma ½ (1989): Yohtaroh's Mother
- The Laughing Salesman (1989): Additional voice
- Pygmalio (1990): Narration, City Woman
- Oh! My Combu (1991): Cucumber
- Magical Princess Minky Momo: Hold on to Your Dreams (1991): Queen of Marinarsa
- Moero! Top Striker (1991): Hikari's Aunt
- Tekkaman Blade (1992): Hun Rii/Tekkaman Sword
- Dominion (1991): The Mayor
- Bakabon: Osomatsu's 3000 Leagues in Search of Curry (1991): Matsuyo Matsuno, Ichimatsu Matsuno
- Thumbelina: A Magical Story (1992): Zobiru
- Mobile Fighter G Gundam (1994): Nastasha Zabigov
- The Legend of Snow White (1994): Crystal
- Macross 7 (1994): Alice Holiday
- Magical Circle Guru Guru (1994): Narrator
- Wedding Peach (1995): Omanma
- Bit the Cupid (1995): Hera
- Bonobono (1995): Chipmunk's Mother
- After War Gundam X (1996): Shōra (Ep. 15)
- The Kindaichi Case Files (1997): Satomi Kaizu
- Cutie Honey Flash (1997): Blizzard Claw (Ep. 20), Dark Panther (Ep. 22)
- Detective Conan (1999): Yoriko Komatsu (Eps. 172–173), Benio Tsumagari (Eps. 385–387)
- Shūkan Storyland (2000): Mariko Matsumoto
- Heart-Pounding Legend Magical Circle Guru Guru (2000): Narrator
- Geisters: Fractions of the Earth (2001): Inamura Jūno
- Haré+Guu (2001): Bell
- Hajime no Ippo: The Fighting! (2001): Yamada's Mother
- Seven of Seven (2002): Home Economics Teacher
- The Twelve Kingdoms (2002): Mother of Essentials
- E's Otherwise (2003): Orphanage Headmistress (Ep. 13)
- Ninja Scroll (2003): Rengoku (Eps. 3 and 8)
- Saint Beast (2003): Mother
- Detective School Q (2003): Hanayo Ichinose (Ep. 12), Kōsei Asakura (Ep. 12)
- Battle Programmer Shirase (2003): Mitsuko Shirase (Eps. 10–12)
- Firestorm (2003): Ruth Miller
- Yami to Bōshi to Hon no Tabibito (2003): Wet Nurse
- R.O.D the TV (2003): Catherine Komuro
- Agatha Christie's Great Detectives Poirot and Marple (2004): Pollitt
- Speed Grapher (2005): Kaoru Koganei (Lady Diamond)
- Black Jack (2005): Nurse (Karte 33)
- Pokémon: Advanced (2005): Sakie (Ep. 148)
- Blassreiter (2008): Helga
- Hajme no Ippo: New Challenger (2009): Yamada's Mother
- Hello Anne: Before Green Gables (2009): Amy Carlisle
- Skip Beat! (2009): Hiroko Iizuka, Narration for "Dark Moon"
- Hipira (2009): Malena
- Phi Brain: Puzzle of God (2011): Laura
- Aikatsu! (2013): Ikuyo Inamura
- Danchi Tomoo (2013): Grandma
- Kuromajo-san ga Toru!! (2014): Madame Ten-Ten
- Dai-Shogun – Great Revolution (2014): Otomi
- Shirobako (2014): Mari Tateo (Eps. 6 and 13)
- Go! Princess Pretty Cure (2015): Sumire Zama
- Food Wars!: Shokugeki no Soma (2015): Fumio Daimidō
- Heavy Object (2015): Ayami Cherryblossom
- The Great Passage (2016): Chie Matsumoto
- Children of the Whales (2017): Rasha (Eps 6 and 10)
- Night Head 2041 (2021): Akiko Okuhara
- Skip and Loafer (2023): Grandma (Ep. 9)
- Train to the End of the World (2024): Capybara
- Terminator Zero (2024): The Prophet
- Miru: Paths to My Future (2025): Narration (Ep. 79)
- Inexpressive Kashiwada and Expressive Oota (2025): Narration

=== Theatrical animation ===
- Space Adventure Cobra (1982): Additional voice
- Xabungle Graffiti (1983): Elchi Cargo
- Wicked City (1987): Kanako/Spider Woman
- Osomatsu-kun: Greetings from the Planet Watermelon! (1989): Ichimatsu Matsuno, Matsuyo Matsuno
- Little Nemo: Adventures in Slumberland (1989): Nemo's Mother
- The Five Star Stories (1989): Fatima Megera, Fatima Atropos
- Ai to Ken no Camelot: Mangaka Marina Time Slip Jiken (1990): Ron
- Eiji (1990): Kimie Akagi
- Chimpui Eri-sama Katsudou Daishashin (1990): Scripter
- Mobile Suit Gundam F91 (1991): Leahlee Edaberry
- Yūkan Club: From Hong Kong with Love (1991): Yuriko Kenbishi
- Legend of the Galactic Heroes: Overture to a New War (1993): Magdalena von Westphale
- Mahōjin Guru Guru (1996): Narrator
- Geisters Fractions of the Earth (2002): Inamura Jūno
- A Tree of Palme (2002): Daruyama
- The Day When I Was Born (2002): Mrs. Honekawa
- Doraemon: Nobita and the Windmasters (2003): Mrs. Honekawa
- Shirobako: The Movie (2020): Mari Tateo

=== Original video animation ===
- Outlanders (1986): Battia Braytin Law
- Blue Comet SPT Layzner (1986): Mill Julia Asuka Albarto
- Panzer World Galient: Chapter of the Land (1986): Lorna (episode 1)
- New Cream Lemon Part 1: Tō Moriyama Guest Special (1987): Sonoko Irinoda
- Battle Royal High School (1987): Fairy Master (Cain)
- Digital Devil Story Megami Tensei (1987): Ohara
- Puttsun Make LOVE (1987): Ms. Akimoto
- Appleseed (1988): Legislator Woman
- Peacock King: Festival of the Ogres Revival (1988): Yami
- Shinshuu Sudama Hen (1988): Rurichō
- Dominion: Tank Police (1988): The Mayor
- The Sloth Was Watching (1988): Heikichi's Mother
- New Story of Aura Battler Dunbine (1988): Musy Poe
- Fairy King (1988): Melusine
- Legend of the Galactic Heroes (1988): Magdalena von Westphale
- Aoki Honō (1989): Fumie Naitō
- Blue Sonnet (1989): Kyōko Sodeki
- Osomatsu-kun: Iyami Alone in the Wind (1990): Ichimatsu Matsuno, Matsuyo Matsuno
- Lemon Angel (1990): Takahashi
- Mantaro the One-Knife Chef (1991): Akiyo Fūmi
- Ippon Bocho Mantaro 2: Osaka Somen War (1991): Akiyo Fūmi
- Kumo no Noru (1991): Hannya
- Stardust Paradise (1991): Shizuka Yūki
- Yūkan Club: Dog & Cat Complete HOW Match (1991): Yuriko Kenbishi
- Ys: Castle in the Heavens – Adol Christin's Adventure (1992): Banoa
- OZ (1992): 1021
- The Silver Man (1992): Shizuko
- Green Legend Ran (1992): Ian
- The Light of the World: Saint Shinran (1992): Tamahi (episodes 1-3), Woman
- Dragon Slayer: The Legend of Heroes (1992): Felicia
- Yūkan Club 2: With Love from Hong Kong (1992): Yuriko Kenbishi
- K.O. Beast Century Warriors II (1993): Gaia
- Shonan Junai Gumi (1994): Yuki
- Legend of the Galactic Heroes: A Hundred Billion Stars, a Hundred Billion Lights (1998): Magdalena von Westphale
- Virgin Fleet (1998): Fujiwara Hatsumi
- Legend of the Galactic Heroes Gaiden: "The Duelist" (2000): Magdalena von Westphale
- Haré+Guu FINAL (2003): Bell
- New Onimusha: Dawn of Dreams The Story (2006): Lady Yodo

=== Video games ===
- Cyber City Oedo 808: Attribute of the Beast (1991): Maya Kurusu, Bar Owner, Bar Woman
- VainDream (1993): Goddess El
- Shin Super Robot Taisen (1996): Mill Julia Asuka Albatro
- Haunted Casino (1996): Jupine Quintina
- Super Robot Wars F (1997): Musy Poe
- EVE: The Lost One (1998): Luke
- Bokan Desu yo (1998): Grated Turnip
- Virgin Fleet (1999): Hatsuki Fujiwara
- Eve Zero (2000): Haruka Ōyama
- Sunrise Eiyuudan R (2000): Musy Poe
- Super Robot Wars Alpha (2000): Musy Poe
- PoPoLoCrois Monogatari II (2000): Myra
- Sunrise Eiyuudan 2 (2001): Musy Poe, Elchi Cargo
- Super Robot Wars Alpha Gaiden (2001): Elchi Cargo
- Bokan GoGoGo (2001): Grated Turnip
- Super Robot Wars Impact (2002): Musy Poe
- Sunrise World War from Sunrise Eiyuutan (2003): Mill Julia Asuka Albatro, Musy Poe, Elchi Cargo
- Slotter Up Core 3: Yuda! Doronjo ni Omakase (2004): Grated Turnip
- PoPoLoCrois Monogatari: Pietro Ouji no Bouken (2005): Myra
- Mobile Suit Gundam: Climax U.C. (2006): Leahlee Edaberry
- Onimusha: Dawn of Dreams (2006): Lady Yodo, Ophelia
- Sunrise Eiyuutan 3 (2006): Musy Poe, Elchi Cargo
- SD Gundam G Generation (2007): Leahlee Edaberry
- Super Robot Wars Scramble Commander the 2nd (2007): Musy Poe
- Super Robot Wars Z (2008): Elchi Cargo
- Gundam Assault Survive (2010): Leahlee Edaberry
- Nier Replicant (2010): Kaine's Grandmother
- Super Robot Wars Z2: Hakai-Hen (2011): Elchi Cargo
- Super Robot Wars Z2: Saisei-Hen (2012): Elchi Cargo
- Super Robot Wars BX (2015): Musy Poe
- Tales of Berseria (2016): Tabitha Baskerville
- Super Robot Wars DD (2021): Musy Poe, Mill Julia Asuka Albatro
- Inazuma Eleven: Victory Road (2025): Nerida Neuland

=== Dubbing ===
==== Animation ====
- ReBoot (1994): Hexadecimal (Shirley Millner) (Fuji TV version)

==== Live-action ====
- Dinosaurs (1990): Monica DeVertebrae (Suzie Plakson)
