= Tony Tani =

Japanese performer (1917-1987)

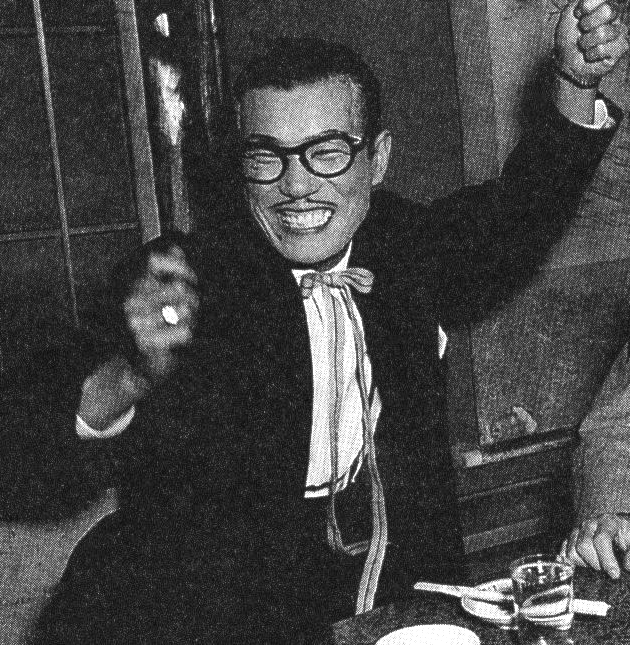
- Tony Tani c. 1950
- Born: 14 October 1917; Chūō-ku, Tokyo, Japan
- Died: 16 July 1987 (aged 69)
- Other name: Shotaro Otani (real name)
- Occupations: Emcee, Comedian, Singer, Actor

Tony Tani (トニー谷) (14 October 1917 – 16 July 1987) was a popular Japanese entertainer of the 1950s. His flamboyant stage persona satirized American stereotypes of the Japanese as well as the influence of the U.S. occupation on Japanese culture.

== Career ==
Serving as a popular emcee on radio shows and in dance halls, Tani developed a campy, high-energy stage persona that combined archaic speaking conventions of upper-class madams with caustic catchphrases and anachronistic smatterings of pidgin English. He parodied American style with androgynous eyeglasses, a pencil-thin "Colman" mustache, and slick suits and wig, calling himself "Number One Handsome Boy." Tani channeled Spike Jones with satirical jazz performances, using an abacus as a percussion instrument in lampooning post-war Japan's economic fixations.

Tani openly mocked his audiences, an abrasive style that initially entertained his fans but eventually wore thin on the public and the press, who criticized Tani for lacking humility following the safe release of his kidnapped son in 1955. His popularity waned as Japanese social critics led the nation in reasserting Japan's independent cultural identity, attacking Tani as a symbol of America's "colonization". In later years he worked to revitalize his career amid continued resistance in the press and from the entertainment industry, including producers of nostalgic television retrospectives. He died of liver cancer in 1987.

== Cultural legacy ==
- Manga creator Fujio Akatsuka based his flashy Osomatsu-kun character Iyami (whose name means gaudy or disagreeable) on Tani.
- The 2011 Pokémon TV series episode "Ohbem, Doubran, and the Dream Thief!" features a character named Leon who is a physical caricature of Tani with behavioral elements of Iyami.
- Satoshi Kon stated in audio commentary for the 2006 film Paprika that Tony Tani influenced the antics of characters in the climactic parade sequence and noted that younger viewers might not understand that.
- In 1987 Eiichi Ohtaki produced the album This is Mr. Tony Tani, a compilation of Tani's novelty musical recordings, which combined elements of jazz, mambo, cha-cha-chá, and traditional Japanese music.
- In 2025 in the third episode of the anime Akuyaku Reijou Tensei Ojisan (Stylized "From Bureaucrat to Villainess: Dad's Been Reincarnated" in English) referred to Tony Tani after the Main Character scolds another member of the Student Council for playing with an abacus like a musical instrument.
