= List of Mr. Osomatsu episodes =

First Blu-ray Disc volume featuring main protagonist Osomatsu Matsuno

Mr. Osomatsu, known in Japan as Osomatsu-san, is a 2015 anime television series directed by Yoichi Fujita and produced by Pierrot, based on Fujio Akatsuka's Osomatsu-kun manga series. Celebrating Akatsuka's 80th birthday, the series follows the sextuplet Matsuno brothers as they now start living as adults.

The first season aired between October 6, 2015, and March 29, 2016, on TV Tokyo and other channels, and was simulcast by Crunchyroll. Following its broadcast, the first episode was removed from streaming and is replaced by an original video animation episode in its home video release. A special episode, produced in collaboration with the Japan Racing Association, aired on December 12, 2016.

For the first twelve episodes, the opening theme is "Hanamaru Pippi wa Yoi Ko dake" (はなまるぴっぴはよいこだけ, The Hanamaru Whistle is Only for Good Kids) by AŌP while the ending theme is "Six Same Faces ~Kon'ya wa Saikō!!!!!!~ (SIX SAME FACES ～今夜は最高!!!!!!～, Six Same Faces ~Tonight is the Best!!!!!!~) by Iyami (Kenichi Suzumura) and the Matsuno brothers (Takahiro Sakurai, Yuichi Nakamura, Hiroshi Kamiya, Jun Fukuyama, Daisuke Ono, and Miyu Irino). For episodes thirteen onwards, the opening theme is "Zenryoku Batankyū" (全力バタンキュー, Hit the Sack At Full Force) by AŌP while the ending theme is "Six Shame Faces ~~Kon'ya mo Saikō!!!!!!~ (SIX SHAME FACES 〜今夜も最高!!!!!!〜, Six Shame Faces ~Tonight is Also the Best!!!!!!~) by Totoko (Aya Endō) and the Matsuno Brothers. In the end of special episode, the message "See You Again" appeared as the endcard.

The second season aired in Japan between October 3, 2017, and March 27, 2018. For the first thirteen episodes, the opening theme is "Kunshi Ayauku Mo Chikouyore" (君氏危うくも近うよれ, Bring You As Close As Possible) by AŌP while the ending theme is "Let's Go! Muttsugo! ~Rokushoku no Niji~" (レッツゴー！ムッツゴー！～6色の虹～, Let's Go! Sextuplets! ~The Six-Colored Rainbow~) by ROOTS66. From episode 14 onwards, the opening theme is "Maboroshi Wink" (まぼろしウインク, Iridescent Wink) by AŌP while the ending theme is "Otona÷6×Kodomo×6" (大人÷6×子供×6, Adult÷6×Child×6) by The Osomatsu-sans.

The third season aired in Japan between October 13, 2020, and March 30, 2021.

The fourth season began airing in Japan on July 9, 2025, on TV Tokyo and its affiliates. In service of AŌP, who had disbanded in 2021 after providing the opening themes for the past three seasons, "Osomatsu-san no Bomba Sheeh!" (おそ松さんのボンバシェー！) is performed by DA PUMP, while the ending theme is titled "Buddy" (バディ) performed by Hitomi from Atarayo and the main characters.

== Series overview ==
Season	Episodes	Originally released	
Season	Episodes	First released	Last released
1	25	October 6, 2015	March 29, 2016
2	25	October 3, 2017	March 27, 2018
3	25	October 13, 2020	March 30, 2021
4	13	July 9, 2025	June 6, 2026

== Episodes ==
=== Season 1 (2015–16) ===
No.	Title	Directed by	Written by	Original release date
1	"Osomatsu-kun Returns!"; Transliteration: "Fukkatsu! Osomatsu-kun" (Japanese: 復活！おそ松くん)	Takashi Andō	Shū Matsubara	October 6, 2015
When the sextuplet Matsuno brothers; Osomatsu, Karamatsu, Choromatsu, Ichimatsu, Jyushimatsu, and Todomatsu, learn that Osomatsu-kun is getting a brand new anime, they have doubts that their Shōwa era gags will cut it in a modern day anime. Thus, the brothers end up revamping themselves as a colorful bishōnen idol anime, in which they are all the handsome idol group F6, with unique looks and personalities. However, after performing various feats such as saving the Earth from a meteor and somehow killing Totoko with their charms, the burden of being in a popular anime proves to be too much for the brothers' Shōwa era bodies to handle. Things soon get hectic when more characters appear in their rebooted forms, and the whole thing inevitably descends into a mishmash of parodies and blatant copyright infringement. Forced to go back to the drawing board and scrapping F6, the brothers end up spending the next ten years doing absolutely nothing, at which point the actual anime begins. This episode was removed from streaming services in November 2015 and is not included in home video releases.
2	"Let's Get a Job"; Transliteration: "Shūshoku Shiyō" (Japanese: 就職しよう)	Tomoya Tanaka	Shū Matsubara	October 13, 2015
2	"The Melancholy of Osomatsu"; Transliteration: "Osomatsu no Yūutsu" (Japanese: おそ松の憂鬱)	Tomoya Tanaka	Shū Matsubara	October 13, 2015
After struggling to find employment, the Matsuno brothers wind up working at the shady Black Factory. Osomatsu tries to take an interest in his younger brothers' lives, only to wind up being a nuisance to each of them.
3	"Tidbits Collection"; Transliteration: "Kobore Banashi-shū" (Japanese: こぼれ話集)	Yoshinori Odaka	Shū Matsubara	October 20, 2015
A series of random shorts and parodies. A certain puppet-faced villain has trouble finding the right sextuplet to take revenge on, Dekapan becomes a superhero only to wind up in jail for indecency, Todomatsu tries to keep his pachinko winnings away from his brothers, Choromatsu has trouble getting a good night's sleep, Iyami winds up on the receiving end of a trick or treat, and an inappropriate quiz show is held at the public bath. Parts of this episode were altered following its terrestrial broadcast.
4	"Let's Become Independent"; Transliteration: "Jiritsu Shiyō" (Japanese: 自立しよう)	Kana Kawana	Shū Matsubara	October 27, 2015
4	"This Is Totoko"; Transliteration: "Totoko na no da" (Japanese: トト子なのだ)	Kana Kawana	Shū Matsubara	October 27, 2015
Choromatsu is worried that his brothers are depending too much on their parents. All of a sudden, their parents got into a fight which ends in them filing for divorce. Wanting their parents to stay together, the Matsuno sextuplets somehow participate in an interview to let their parents choose which child should they take care of. Osomatsu is curious why Totoko suddenly invites him to her room, only to discover everyone else has been invited as well.
5	"The Karamatsu Incident"; Transliteration: "Karamatsu Jihen" (Japanese: カラ松事変)	Mitsutoshi Satō	Shū Matsubara	November 3, 2015
5	"ESP Kitty"; Transliteration: "Esupā Nyanko" (Japanese: エスパーニャンコ)	Mitsutoshi Satō	Shū Matsubara	November 3, 2015
Karamatsu is taken hostage by Chibita, who demands the Matsuno brothers pay off their tab for his oden stand, only to find the brothers don't really care about him. Later, Ichimatsu's cat friend becomes injected with a serum that allows it to speak human language and read people's minds, exposing Ichimatsu's true feelings.
6	"It's a Birthday Party, Dajo"; Transliteration: "Otanjōbi-kai Dajō" (Japanese: おたんじょうび会ダジョー)	Hiromichi Matano; Nanako Shimazaki	Michiko Yokote; Yukio Okada	November 10, 2015
6	"Iyami's Great Discovery"; Transliteration: "Iyami no Dai Hakken" (Japanese: イヤミの大発見)	Hiromichi Matano; Nanako Shimazaki	Michiko Yokote; Yukio Okada	November 10, 2015
The Matsunos are invited to Hatabō's birthday party, becoming surprised to learn he is living the rich life. Meanwhile, Iyami struggles with being flat broke until he discovers that his teeth contain a rare metal.
7	"Todomatsu and the Five Demons"; Transliteration: "Todomatsu to Gonin no Akuma" (Japanese: トド松と5人の悪魔)	Mamiko Sekiya; Seishirō Nagaya	Shū Matsubara	November 17, 2015
7	"Going North"; Transliteration: "Kita e" (Japanese: 北へ)	Mamiko Sekiya; Seishirō Nagaya	Shū Matsubara	November 17, 2015
Todomatsu faces the biggest threat to his social life when his brothers show up at his workplace just as his co-workers are about to invite him to a mixer. Meanwhile, Dekapan and Dayōn try to make their way across America through harsh environments, pushing their friendship to its limits.
8	"The Calming Osomatsu"; Transliteration: "Nagomi no Osomatsu" (Japanese: なごみのおそ松)	Yoshinori Odaka	Shū Matsubara	November 24, 2015
8	"Totoko's Dream"; Transliteration: "Totoko no Yume" (Japanese: トト子の夢)	Yoshinori Odaka	Shū Matsubara	November 24, 2015
Osomatsu plays a "calming detective" who calms down people working on murder cases with his buffoonery instead of actually solving them, much to the dismay of the serious Detective Todomatsu. Back in reality, the Matsunos try to help Totoko become more popular as a fish-themed idol.
9	"Chibita and Oden"; Transliteration: "Chibita to Oden" (Japanese: チビ太とおでん)	Mamiko Sekiya; Kazuhisa Ōno	Shū Matsubara	December 1, 2015
9	"Jyushimatsu Falls in Love"; Transliteration: "Koisuru Jūshimatsu" (Japanese: 恋する十四松)	Mamiko Sekiya; Kazuhisa Ōno	Shū Matsubara	December 1, 2015
While discussing his career plans, Karamatsu somehow winds up as Chibita's apprentice at his oden stand. Later, Jyushimatsu suddenly starts acting more calm compared to his usually hyper self, with the brothers learning that he has fallen in love with a girl who actually enjoys his antics. However, he is rejected after asking her out, as she is due to move, but the brothers encourage him to see her off as she leaves.
10	"Iyami and Chibita's Rental Girlfriend"; Transliteration: "Iyami Chibita no Rentaru Kanojo" (Japanese: イヤミチビ太のレンタル彼女)	Yukina Hiiro	Yukio Okada; Shū Matsubara	December 8, 2015
Looking to earn some easy money, Iyami and Chibita set up their own "Rental Girlfriend" business, which gets no business due to how ugly they look. To their end, they take an experimental drug from Dekapan and transform into cute girls that manage to catch the attention of the Matsuno brothers. The pair soon use their now-feminine wiles to charm the sextuplets, hitting them with various hidden fees to make a lot of money. However, the drug soon starts losing its effectiveness, causing them to lose their female forms during a final date with the brothers.
11	"Christmas Osomatsu-san"; Transliteration: "Kurisumasu Osomatsu-san" (Japanese: クリスマスおそ松さん)	Shintarō Inokawa	Shū Matsubara	December 15, 2015
A series of Christmas-themed skits. Ichimatsu takes on the role of a Black Santa interrupting a romantic couple's date, while Karamatsu finds himself on a date with an unfortunate ending. In the F6-verse, Totoko gets romantic Christmas greetings from each of the brothers, who in reality are having a somewhat disturbing gift exchange. Iyami acts as The Little Match Girl, Dekapan and Dayōn celebrate Christmas together, and Jyushimatsu stays up waiting to capture Santa. The brothers then drink their problems away before failing to get Totoko to go out with them.
12	"Year-End Special-san"; Transliteration: "Nenmatsu Supesharu-san" (Japanese: 年末スペシャルさん)	N/A	N/A	December 22, 2015
Osomatsu and Totoko and Osomatsu host an end of year special broadcast, looking back on previous episodes to determine which of the brothers is the biggest loser. A commentary audio track featuring voice actors from the series was released on Crunchyroll on December 24, 2015.
13	"Accident?"; Transliteration: "Jiko?" (Japanese: 事故？)	Hiroyuki Okuno	Michiko Yokote; Shū Matsubara	January 5, 2016
A dramatic tale about a down-on-his-luck salaryman named Sanematsu who faces hardships from his co-workers, but does what it takes to care for his sextuplet brothers, who are all part of his imagination. Genderbent versions of the Matsuno siblings as they get into arguments with each other over guys. Choromatsu becomes disgruntled with Osomatsu after he interrupts his "private time", which soon leads to the rest of the brothers arguing with each other for both masturbatory and non-masturbatory reasons.
14	"We Caught a Cold"; Transliteration: "Kaze Hiita" (Japanese: 風邪ひいた)	Nanako Shimazaki	Shū Matsubara; Yukio Okada	January 12, 2016
14	"Todomatsu's Line"; Transliteration: "Todomatsu no Rain" (Japanese: トド松のライン)	Nanako Shimazaki	Shū Matsubara; Yukio Okada	January 12, 2016
The brothers all catch colds, with whoever's left healthy causing a lot of trouble while trying to take care of the others. Later, the brothers question Todomatsu about all the things he hasn't told them about his personal life. Afterwards, Choromatsu plays the role of a paranoid vice-principal overly worried about plans for his school's cultural festival.
15	"Interview"; Transliteration: "Mensetsu" (Japanese: 面接)	Seishirō Nagaya	Michiko Yokote; Shū Matsubara	January 19, 2016
15	"The Life of Chibita's Flower"; Transliteration: "Chibita no Hana no Inochi" (Japanese: チビ太の花のいのち)	Seishirō Nagaya	Michiko Yokote; Shū Matsubara	January 19, 2016
Jyushimatsu goes to a job interview, proving to be a total nuisance for the interviewers. The Girlymatsus try to pass the time while on vacation. Chibita is asked out on a date by the fairy of a flower he saved the other day, who shows him there's more to life besides oden.
16	"The Ichimatsu Incident"; Transliteration: "Ichimatsu Jihen" (Japanese: 一松事変)	Tsuneo Tominaga	Michiko Yokote; Shū Matsubara	January 26, 2016
In a post-apocalyptic world, F6 battle against Iyami and Dekapan, who are robbing the dry-skinned citizens of all of their lubricant. Back in reality, Ichimatsu is forced to pretend to be Karamatsu after Osomatsu catches him wearing his clothes.
17	"Jyushimatsu Festival"; Transliteration: "Jūshimatsu Matsuri" (Japanese: 十四松まつり)	Hikaru Yamaguchi	Michiko Yokote; Yukio Okada	February 2, 2016
A series of skits all revolving around Jyushimatsu as he defuses bombs, eats cup ramen, sells doujinshi, tries to keep Karamatsu's pachinko victory a secret, contemplates his own existence, helps Todomatsu face surgery, takes Totoko to dream-like places, and gets pumped with steroids. Meanwhile, the other brothers try to find out when Jyushimatsu developed his odd personality.
18	"Iyami's Counterattack"; Transliteration: "Gyakushū no Iyami" (Japanese: 逆襲のイヤミ)	Mamiko Sekiya; Ken'ichi Fujisawa	Michiko Yokote; Shū Matsubara	February 9, 2016
Wanting to become the main protagonist of the franchise again, Iyami holds a Wacky Races-style competition to determine who the protagonist of Osomatsu-san will be. The race quickly turns into a bloodbath as the contestants start killing each other off in order to be the last one standing. After Iyami sets off a death ray that kills off almost everyone on the planet, it comes down to a bizarre final showdown between Osomatsu and Iyami, but they both fall short of the finish line, leading to an unexpected winner.
19	"Period Drama Osomatsu-san"; Transliteration: "Jidaigeki Osomatsu-san" (Japanese: 時代劇おそ松さん)	Tsuneo Tominaga; Ayumu Ono	Michiko Yokote; Shū Matsubara	February 16, 2016
19	"Choromatsu Rising"; Transliteration: "Choromatsu Raijingu" (Japanese: チョロ松ライジング)	Tsuneo Tominaga; Ayumu Ono	Michiko Yokote; Shū Matsubara	February 16, 2016
The concept of a Hijirisawa Shōnosuke-san anime quickly gets dropped due to lack of ideas, replaced with a series of jidaigeki skits set during the Sengoku era. Back in the present, Choromatsu decides to quit being an idol otaku and pursue a job, with Osomatsu and Todomatsu not caring much for his need to announce it. When Choromatsu's self-awareness starts to rise to annoying levels as a result, the brothers try to have him hit on girls to bring it under control, but to no avail.
20	"Tell Me, Hatabō"; Transliteration: "Oshiete Hatabō" (Japanese: 教えてハタ坊)	Tomoya Tanaka	Michiko Yokote; Yukio Okada; Shū Matsubara	February 23, 2016
20	"School Matsu"; Transliteration: "Sukūru Matsu" (Japanese: スクール松)	Tomoya Tanaka	Michiko Yokote; Yukio Okada; Shū Matsubara	February 23, 2016
20	"Iyami's School"; Transliteration: "Iyami no Gakkō" (Japanese: イヤミの学校)	Tomoya Tanaka	Michiko Yokote; Yukio Okada; Shū Matsubara	February 23, 2016
Kicked out of his own company, Hatabō starts his own catering service in order to regain his fortune, leaving the Matsuno siblings curious about what meat he has been using. Later, Osomatsu and Karamatsu play as delinquent high school students competing to see who's the toughest. Afterwards, Iyami starts a comedy class hoping to earn a quick buck, only to take his teaching seriously when the siblings show up for lessons.
21	"Mahjong"; Transliteration: "Mājan" (Japanese: 麻雀)	Tsuneo Tominaga	Michiko Yokote; Shū Matsubara	March 1, 2016
21	"Godmatsu"; Transliteration: "Kamimatsu" (Japanese: 神松)	Tsuneo Tominaga	Michiko Yokote; Shū Matsubara	March 1, 2016
On a rainy evening, the brothers play a game of mahjong, with each brother showing his own strengths and glaring weaknesses. Later, the brothers suddenly find themselves joined by a seventh brother who was allegedly born from the goodness that fell out of their hearts. Although initially surprised by their new sibling's kindness, the sextuplets soon become hostile when he makes their existence more pathetic in comparison to his perfectness.
22	"The Star of Hope, Todomatsu"; Transliteration: "Kibō no Hoshi, Todomatsu" (Japanese: 希望の星、トド松)	Yasuhiro Akamatsu; Rokō Ogiwara	Yukio Okada; Shū Matsubara	March 8, 2016
22	"Final Sheeeh"; Transliteration: "Fainaru Shē" (Japanese: ファイナルシェー)	Yasuhiro Akamatsu; Rokō Ogiwara	Yukio Okada; Shū Matsubara	March 8, 2016
Todomatsu holds auditions to take one of his brothers with him to a mixer, struggling to find anyone worth taking. Meanwhile, Iyami meets a kung-fu master who believes him to possess a special technique and trains him to participate in a martial arts tournament to save his country.
23	"Kerosene"; Transliteration: "Tōyu" (Japanese: 灯油)	Yōko Kanamori; Mamiko Sekiya	Shū Matsubara	March 15, 2016
23	"Dayōn Tribe"; Transliteration: "Dayōn-zoku" (Japanese: ダヨーン族)	Yōko Kanamori; Mamiko Sekiya	Shū Matsubara	March 15, 2016
When the family heater runs out of kerosene, the brothers try to force each other out of the kotatsu to get a refill. Upon stopping by a restaurant on their way from buying some kerosene, Osomatsu, Karamatsu, and Choromatsu find themselves in an underground village populated by a tribe of people resembling Dayōn. When the others enter the village through Dayōn's mouth, they find their older siblings have grown fond of the village and have started to become Dayōn-people themselves.
24	"Totoko's Huge Panic"; Transliteration: "Totoko Ōawate" (Japanese: トト子大あわて)	Nanako Shimazaki	Yukio Okada; Shū Matsubara	March 22, 2016
24	"Letter"; Transliteration: "Tegami" (Japanese: 手紙)	Nanako Shimazaki	Yukio Okada; Shū Matsubara	March 22, 2016
Totoko experiences jealousy for the first time after people start getting more success than her, leading her on a quest to find an oil magnate to marry. Meanwhile, Choromatsu manages to land a job and moves out of the house, with the other brothers soon following suit, leaving just Osomatsu alone with his parents.
25	"Osomatsu-san, Such As It Was"; Transliteration: "Osomatsu-san Deshita" (Japanese: おそまつさんでした)	Tomoya Tanaka; Yoshinori Odaka	Shū Matsubara	March 29, 2016
The brothers quickly abandon their new lifestyles upon learning they have been invited to a baseball tournament. After failing miserably the first time, the family soon grow stronger and reach the final round of the next tournament. Facing off against a ruthless team of aliens that murder the rest of their team, the brothers are spurned on by the chance to lose their virginities, but instead lose the game and presumably their lives.

=== Season 2 (2017–18) ===
No. overall	No. in season	Title	Directed by	Written by	Original release date
26	1	"Mr. Osomatsu Returns"; Transliteration: "Fukkatsu Osomatsu-san" (Japanese: ふっかつ おそ松さん)	Gen Asano; Hikaru Yamaguchi	Shū Matsubara	October 3, 2017
Learning about Mr. Osomatsu's second season, the sextuplets of the past decide to see how they've turned out in the future. To their shock, they discover their future selves have become fat (except Ichimatsu, who has become anorexic) and greedy from their fame and eventually get their comeuppance in the form of an angry mob of NEET virgins. Wanting to change this future, the siblings decide to work hard to become proper adults, each in bizarrely different ways. However, this ideal ends up attracting an angry mob in a different way, and so the anime remains virtually unchanged.
27	2	"Congratulations! Employment!!"; Transliteration: "Shuku Shūshoku!!" (Japanese: 祝・就職！！)	Yoshinori Odaka	Shū Matsubara	October 10, 2017
27	2	"Super Detergent"; Transliteration: "Chō Senzai" (Japanese: 超洗剤)	Yoshinori Odaka	Shū Matsubara	October 10, 2017
Pressured by their parents over their lack of employment, the siblings try their hand at internet streaming, only to get flagged for their inappropriate actions. Later, Iyami uses an experimental detergent made by Dekapan to keep his suit clean for a party. However, it ends up getting drunk by the siblings, causing them to turn invisible down to their organs. As a result, they attempt to paint each others bodies, becoming upset that no one notices anything different about them.
28	3	"Cavematsu-san"; Transliteration: "Genshimatsu-san ①" (Japanese: げんし松さん①)	Toshihiro Maeya	Shū Matsubara	October 17, 2017
28	3	"Choromatsu and Ichimatsu"; Transliteration: "Choromatsu to Ichimatsu" (Japanese: チョロ松と一松)	Toshihiro Maeya	Shū Matsubara	October 17, 2017
28	3	"Totoko's Challenge"; Transliteration: "Totoko no Chōsen" (Japanese: トト子の挑戦)	Toshihiro Maeya	Shū Matsubara	October 17, 2017
Being the only two alone in the house, Choromatsu and Ichimatsu struggle to make conversation with each other. Later, Totoko takes part in an eating contest but keeps getting distracted by the brothers getting attention from the celebrity MC, Shōei.
29	4	"Cavematsu-san"; Transliteration: "Genshimatsu-san ②" (Japanese: げんし松さん②)	Mamiko Sekiya	Shū Matsubara	October 24, 2017
29	4	"Matsuzou and Matsuyo"; Transliteration: "Matsuzō to Matsuyo" (Japanese: 松造と松代)	Mamiko Sekiya	Shū Matsubara	October 24, 2017
Noticing Matsuzou acting strangely, the siblings discover that he is worried that there's not enough spark in his marriage with Matsuyo. Feeling he should return to a more innocent time, the boys give Matsuzou a masterclass in being a virgin, albeit with no success. Matsuzou inevitably resorts to getting a love potion from Dekapan, but ultimately decides against using it, managing to sort things out with Matsuyo by himself.
30	5	"Osomatsu-san in the Summer"; Transliteration: "Samā no Osomatsu-san" (Japanese: 夏のおそ松さん)	Shintarō Inokawa	Shū Matsubara	October 31, 2017
A series of summer-themed skits. Jyushimatsu takes part in radio exercises, Iyami and Chibita try to beat the heat, Todomatsu keeps finding himself exiled by his brothers, Karamatsu tries to inject summer into everyone's lives, and the sextuplets attempt to talk to girls on the beach.
31	6	"Iyami Has Arrived"; Transliteration: "Iyami ga Yattekita" (Japanese: イヤミがやって来た)	Yasuo Iwamoto	Shū Matsubara	November 7, 2017
31	6	"I Want Some Friends, Jo"; Transliteration: "Tomodachi ga Hoshii Jō" (Japanese: ともだちがほしいじょー)	Yasuo Iwamoto	Shū Matsubara	November 7, 2017
Having had a string of bad luck with holding a job, Iyami skives meals and money off of the siblings. Later, everyone tries to help Hatabou find some friends.
32	7	"Cavematsu-san"; Transliteration: "Genshimatsu-san ③" (Japanese: げんし松さん③)	Naoya Andō	Shū Matsubara	November 14, 2017
32	7	"Sangokushi-san"; Transliteration: "Sangokushi-san" (Japanese: 三国志さん)	Naoya Andō	Shū Matsubara	November 14, 2017
32	7	"Osomatsu and Todomatsu"; Transliteration: "Osomatsu to Todomatsu" (Japanese: おそ松とトド松)	Naoya Andō	Shū Matsubara	November 14, 2017
In a parody of Romance of the Three Kingdoms, Emperor Osomatsu and a group of bizarre generals attempt to take over the country. Meanwhile, in the real world, Osomatsu joins Todomatsu at a mixer, struggling to keep his perverted instincts in check.
33	8	"Synthesis"; Transliteration: "Gōsei Dayon" (Japanese: 合成だよん)	Tsuyoshi Tobita	Shū Matsubara	November 21, 2017
33	8	"Jyushimatsu and the Dolphin"; Transliteration: "Jūshimatsu to Iruka" (Japanese: 十四松とイルカ)	Tsuyoshi Tobita	Shū Matsubara	November 21, 2017
33	8	"Totoko and Nyaa"; Transliteration: "Totoko to Nyā ①" (Japanese: トト子とにゃー①)	Tsuyoshi Tobita	Shū Matsubara	November 21, 2017
Dayon uses Dekapan's latest invention to merge various people into new beings, with a fiendish end goal in mind. Jyushimatsu becomes determined to get a job at a sea park as an actual dolphin, receiving strict training from a female trainer. Meanwhile, Totoko and Nyaa encounter each other at Chibita's oden stand.
34	9	"Campaign Starting Now!"; Transliteration: "Kyanpēn Hatsudō!" (Japanese: キャンペーン発動！)	Hikaru Yamaguchi	Shū Matsubara	November 28, 2017
34	9	"Arcade Iyami"; Transliteration: "Gēmu Sentā Iyami" (Japanese: ゲームセンターイヤミ)	Hikaru Yamaguchi	Shū Matsubara	November 28, 2017
34	9	"Totoko and Nyaa 2"; Transliteration: "Totoko to Nyā ②" (Japanese: トト子とにゃー②)	Hikaru Yamaguchi	Shū Matsubara	November 28, 2017
Ichimatsu struggles to get any sleep with his brothers being noisy all night and refusing to turn off the light. Unable to take anymore, Ichimatsu starts monitoring the brothers' courtesy towards each other, leading Osomatsu to get criticised the most. Later, Iyami proves his skills at the arcades by playing games at their highest difficulty.
35	10	"Karamatsu and Brother"; Transliteration: "Karamatsu to Burazā" (Japanese: カラ松とブラザー)	Yoshinori Odaka	Shū Matsubara	December 5, 2017
35	10	"New Employee Totoko"; Transliteration: "Shinnyūshain Totoko" (Japanese: 新入社員トト子)	Yoshinori Odaka	Shū Matsubara	December 5, 2017
35	10	"Dubbingmatsu-san"; Transliteration: "Afurekomatsu-san" (Japanese: アフレコ松さん)	Yoshinori Odaka	Shū Matsubara	December 5, 2017
Karamatsu tries to take on various requests from everyone to look like a reliable brother, only to take on more than he can handle, so Choromatsu tries to teach him how to refuse. Totoko begins working at a company, proving to be a handful for her superior Todomatsu. Later, a pair of voice actors attend a dubbing session of an episode of Mr. Osomatsu, witnessing how the sextuplets do their work.
36	11	"Chibita's Revenge"; Transliteration: "Fukushū no Chibita" (Japanese: 復讐のチビ太)	Toshihiro Maeya	Shū Matsubara	December 12, 2017
Already angered over the siblings gambling instead of paying off their oden tab, Chibita vows revenge on them after they pluck out his one-and-only hair. That night, Chibita begins taking out the siblings one by one, shaving all of their hair and stuffing oden in their orifices.
37	12	"Totoko and Nyaa 3"; Transliteration: "Totoko to Nyā ③" (Japanese: トト子とニャー③)	Takumi Dōyama	Shū Matsubara	December 19, 2017
37	12	"The Eitarou Family"; Transliteration: "Eitarō Oyako" (Japanese: 栄太郎親子)	Takumi Dōyama	Shū Matsubara	December 19, 2017
37	12	"Give Them Back"; Transliteration: "Kaesu Dasu" (Japanese: 返すだス)	Takumi Dōyama	Shū Matsubara	December 19, 2017
37	12	"Totoko and Nyaa 4"; Transliteration: "Totoko to Nyā ④" (Japanese: トト子とニャー④)	Takumi Dōyama	Shū Matsubara	December 19, 2017
Jyushimatsu befriends a young boy named Eitarou but gets called in by Eitarou's mother when he starts imitating him. Contrary to Jyushimatsu's fears, however, she asks him to teach Eitarou jokes so he can make friends at school. Later, Dayon steals Dekapan's underwear, forcing him to give chase all over the city while butt naked.
38	13	"End of the Year"; Transliteration: "Nenmatsu" (Japanese: 年末)	Ai Yoshimura	Shū Matsubara	December 26, 2017
38	13	"Discharge Notice 2017 -The Youngest Brother Who Got Fired-"; Transliteration: "Senryoku-gai Tsūkoku 2017 Kubi o Senkokusareta Suekko" (Japanese: 戦力外通告2017 クビを宣告された末っ子)	Ai Yoshimura	Shū Matsubara	December 26, 2017
A series of end-of-year skits. Osomatsu and Choromatsu try to do one thing that could make them say they had a good year. Ichimatsu gets persuaded to take part in a lottery, Dekapan and Dayon pound mochi together, Hatobou gets pestered by some greedy Jizou statues, and Choromatsu sends some untruthful New Years' cards. During the second half, a news crew documents Todomatsu, who was let go from the Matsuno family the previous year and is forced to try out for a reserve team.
39	14	"Sanematsu-san Episode 9"; Transliteration: "Sanematsu-san Daikyūwa" (Japanese: 実松さん 第九話)	Mamiko Sekiya	Shū Matsubara	January 9, 2018
39	14	"UMA Expedition Team"; Transliteration: "Yūma Tanken-tai" (Japanese: UMA探検隊)	Mamiko Sekiya	Shū Matsubara	January 9, 2018
39	14	"The Choromatsu Incident"; Transliteration: "Choromatsu Jihen" (Japanese: チョロ松事変)	Mamiko Sekiya	Shū Matsubara	January 9, 2018
Sanematsu wakes up in Osomatsu's world as the seventh Matsuno brother. After spending several weeks of happiness with the siblings, Sanematsu eventually realizes it was all a dying dream he had been experiencing after ending up in a fatal car accident. Jyushimatsu, Iyami, and Hatabou, the UMA Expedition Team, go on a hunt to find a Super Mongolian Death Worm. Choromatsu changes up his image by dying his hair brown, making it hard for his brothers to tell him that it's doesn't actually make him look cool.
40	15	"UMA Expedition Team"; Transliteration: "Yūma Tanken-tai ②" (Japanese: UMA探検隊②)	Shintarō Inokawa	Shū Matsubara	January 16, 2018
40	15	"Jar"; Transliteration: "Bin" (Japanese: びん)	Shintarō Inokawa	Shū Matsubara	January 16, 2018
40	15	"Karamatsu Taxi"; Transliteration: "Karamatsu Takushī" (Japanese: カラ松タクシー)	Shintarō Inokawa	Shū Matsubara	January 16, 2018
40	15	"Totty Quiz"; Transliteration: "Totti Kuizu" (Japanese: トッティクイズ)	Shintarō Inokawa	Shū Matsubara	January 16, 2018
The UMA Expedition Team track down the chupacabra, with disastrous results. The brothers struggle to remove the lid off of a particularly stubborn jar. Karamatsu runs his own taxi service, proving to have no idea what he is doing when he picks up an office lady. Finally, Totty holds a quiz for his brothers, containing several questions without right answers.
41	16	"Space Pirates"; Transliteration: "Uchū Kaizoku" (Japanese: 宇宙海賊)	Kana Kawana	Shū Matsubara	January 23, 2018
41	16	"Gourmet Episode"; Transliteration: "Gurume Kai" (Japanese: グルメ回)	Kana Kawana	Shū Matsubara	January 23, 2018
41	16	"The Cutie Next Door"; Transliteration: "Tonari no Kawaiko-chan" (Japanese: となりのかわい子ちゃん)	Kana Kawana	Shū Matsubara	January 23, 2018
A group of aliens pursue the legendary space pirate, Shazarr. Displeased with Chibita's oden, Matsuzō serves up his own brand of oden, only for no one to show up. Later, the sextuplets become enamored by their new neighbor, Kinko Inuyama, prompting jealousy from Totoko when they go on a date with Kinko instead of her.
42	17	"UMA Expedition Team"; Transliteration: "Yūma Tanken-tai ③" (Japanese: UMA探検隊③)	Hikaru Yamaguchi	Shū Matsubara	January 30, 2018
42	17	"Punishment!"; Transliteration: "Imashime!" (Japanese: 戒め！)	Hikaru Yamaguchi	Shū Matsubara	January 30, 2018
42	17	"Inn"; Transliteration: "Ryokan" (Japanese: 旅館)	Hikaru Yamaguchi	Shū Matsubara	January 30, 2018
42	17	"Delivery Skit"; Transliteration: "Deribarī Konto" (Japanese: デリバリーコント)	Hikaru Yamaguchi	Shū Matsubara	January 30, 2018
The UMA Expedition Team track down the devil yeti. Ichimatsu becomes paranoid when lucky things happen to him all day, so he and Jyushimatsu try to punish themselves to balance things out. A lovey-dovey couple go to a hot spring inn that's haunted by a zashiki-warashi named Osoma.
43	18	"Iyami, Alone in the Wind"; Transliteration: "Iyami wa Hitori Kaze no Naka" (Japanese: イヤミはひとり風の中)	Yoshinori Odaka	Shū Matsubara	February 6, 2018
In a retelling of City Lights, Iyami comes across a blind flower girl named Okiku and, despite being poor himself, tries to help her raise money for eye surgery. Failing to win a wrestling match due to interference from Chibita, who develops a crush on Okiku, Iyami begins working an earnest living to raise the money. With Iyami still falling way short of the surgery bill, Chibita tries to give him the remaining money under the pretense of a robbery, only to wind up getting him implicated as an actual robber. However, the rest of the town comes to Iyami and he manages to get the money over to Okiku before he gets caught. Years later, after finally being released from prison, Iyami is relieved to see Okiku now living a normal life as a florist.
44	19	"President Dekapan"; Transliteration: "Dekapan Daitōryō" (Japanese: デカパン大統領)	Takumi Dōyama	Shū Matsubara	February 13, 2018
44	19	"Ventriloquism"; Transliteration: "Fukuwajutsu" (Japanese: ふくわ術)	Takumi Dōyama	Shū Matsubara	February 13, 2018
44	19	"Valentine's Day"; Transliteration: "Barentain Dē" (Japanese: バレンタインデー)	Takumi Dōyama	Shū Matsubara	February 13, 2018
44	19	"Delivery Skit"; Transliteration: "Deribarī Konto" (Japanese: デリバリーコント)	Takumi Dōyama	Shū Matsubara	February 13, 2018
After Dekapan becomes president, his secretary Todomatsu tries to keep him from pressing the Big Red Button. Iyami attempts to pull off a sham ventriloquism scheme by having Chibita and Hatabou act as his puppets. On Valentine's Day, the brothers try in vain to get some Valentine's chocolate from someone.
45	20	"Tidbits Collection 2"; Transliteration: "Kobore Banashi-shū2" (Japanese: こぼれ話集2)	Toshihiro Maeya	Shū Matsubara	February 20, 2018
Another collection of assorted skits. Chibita tries selling some sextuplet meat buns, Choromatsu files his taxes, Osomatsu accuses his brothers of stealing his wallet, a fierce wave of pollen hits town, Totoko tries to escape a creepy maze, Jyushimatsu becomes a raccoon, Todomatsu tries doing something crazy, kindergartners visit a bread factory, the Proper-Rangers prepare to set off, and Osomatsu takes part in a skeleton event.
46	21	"The Late Night Himatsuya"; Transliteration: "Shin'ya no Himatsuya" (Japanese: 深夜の日松屋)	Mamiko Sekiya	Shū Matsubara	February 27, 2018
46	21	"BANANA"	Mamiko Sekiya	Shū Matsubara	February 27, 2018
46	21	"NEET Correctional Facility"; Transliteration: "Nīto Kyōsei Shisetsu" (Japanese: ニート矯正施設)	Mamiko Sekiya	Shū Matsubara	February 27, 2018
The brothers get rowdy while getting drunk at a restaurant. Unemployed office lady Totomi ends up taking a job at a strange establishment that offers some peculiar services. After being visited by a salesman, Matsuyo contemplates sending off one of her sons to a NEET correctional facility, asking Choromatsu to help her decide which one to send away.
47	22	"Overseas Vacation"; Transliteration: "Kaigai Ryokō" (Japanese: 海外旅行)	Yasuhiro Akamatsu	Shū Matsubara	March 6, 2018
Just as the gang sets off for a vacation in Hawaii, their plane crashes and they wind up stranded on a deserted island. Finding escape from the island to be seemingly impossible, the gang adapt to island life and eventually form their own society. This soon falls apart after Karamatsu finds some toilet paper and tries to keep it for himself, leading to an all-out battle for the item. This escalates even further as everyone awakens their latent super powers.
48	23	"The Late Night Himatsuya 2"; Transliteration: "Shin'ya no Himatsuya ②" (Japanese: 深夜の日松屋②)	Shintarō Inokawa	Shū Matsubara	March 13, 2018
48	23	"Dayon and Dayon"; Transliteration: "Dayōn to Dayōn" (Japanese: ダヨーンとダヨーン)	Shintarō Inokawa	Shū Matsubara	March 13, 2018
48	23	"Iyami-san Is Troubled"; Transliteration: "Nayamu Iyami-san" (Japanese: 悩むイヤミさん)	Shintarō Inokawa	Shū Matsubara	March 13, 2018
48	23	"The Late Night Himatsuya 3"; Transliteration: "Shin'ya no Himatsuya ③" (Japanese: 深夜の日松屋③)	Shintarō Inokawa	Shū Matsubara	March 13, 2018
The brothers try to come up with reasons to stay at a bar despite Todomatsu's objections. Dayon comes across Kimura, someone who looks exactly like him, and the two hit it off. Meanwhile, Osomatsu and Chibita are asked by the show's producer to convince Iyami, who feels he doesn't fit in the show anymore, not to kill himself.
49	24	"Cherry Blossoms"; Transliteration: "Sakura" (Japanese: 桜)	Hikaru Yamaguchi	Shū Matsubara	March 20, 2018
Matsuzō becomes hospitalized, leading the brothers to seriously think about their lives and get proper jobs to support their family. As Osomatsu starts to find this new life boring, Totoko encourages him to think for himself, leading to him going to deliver a message to his brothers.
50	25	"Mr. Osomatsu in Hell"; Transliteration: "Jigoku no Osomatsu-san" (Japanese: 地獄のおそ松さん)	Takumi Dōyama; Yoshinori Odaka	Shū Matsubara	March 27, 2018
Osomatsu's big announcement to his brothers is interrupted when Iyami crashes a plane into their house, killing them all and sending them to the underworld. Brought before King Enma, the brothers fail to come up with a good reason why they should go to Heaven and ultimately wind up in Hell. Just as the brothers realise they are still virgins, Totoko and the others, aided by the spirit of Fujio Akatsuka, dive into Hell to bring them back. Receiving further help from other dead allies, the brothers manage to escape Hell and return to life, although they are not exactly happy with the state of their rotting bodies.

=== Season 3 (2020–21) ===
No. overall	No. in season	Title	Directed by	Written by	Original release date
51	1	"Replaced"; Transliteration: "Kōban" (Japanese: 降板)	Takumi Dōyama	Shū Matsubara	October 13, 2020
A new season has begun, and the folks at the top aren't jazzed with the adult comedy of the series, having the sextuplets replaced with different versions of themselves that can appeal to everyone. When the real brothers fight for their rightful spot back, they are unceremoniously turned into walking, talking poop. This, however, isn't a deterrent.
52	2	"Dimwit Generation"; Transliteration: "Bonkura no Jidai" (Japanese: ぼんくらの時代)	Yoshinori Odaka	Shū Matsubara	October 20, 2020
52	2	"Hatabou EATS"; Transliteration: "Hatabō EATS" (Japanese: ハタ坊 Eats)	Yoshinori Odaka	Shū Matsubara	October 20, 2020
52	2	"Let's Be Quiet at Night"; Transliteration: "Yoru wa Shizukani" (Japanese: 夜は静かに)	Yoshinori Odaka	Shū Matsubara	October 20, 2020
52	2	"Doctor T"; Transliteration: "Dokutā T" (Japanese: ドクターT)	Yoshinori Odaka	Shū Matsubara	October 20, 2020
52	2	"Triangle Pop"; Transliteration: "Sankaku Poppu" (Japanese: 三角ポップ)	Yoshinori Odaka	Shū Matsubara	October 20, 2020
52	2	"Chair"; Transliteration: "Isu" (Japanese: 椅子)	Yoshinori Odaka	Shū Matsubara	October 20, 2020
52	2	"Delivery"; Transliteration: "O Todoke-mono" (Japanese: お届け物)	Yoshinori Odaka	Shū Matsubara	October 20, 2020
Choromatsu, Todomatsu, and Ichimatsu discuss their expectations for the show's third season. Hatabou struggles to deliver an online food order. The sextuplets harass a touchy couple. Totoko plays an awful but beautiful doctor. Jyushimatsu and Karamatsu hang out in a konbini and find a strange ad. Two robots powered by AI arrive at the Matsuno home.
53	3	"Dimwit Generation"; Transliteration: "Bonkura no Jidai" (Japanese: ぼんくらの時代)	Takashi Andō; Yōichi Fujita	Shū Matsubara	October 27, 2020
53	3	"Estimated Value"; Transliteration: "Hyōka-chi" (Japanese: 評価値)	Takashi Andō; Yōichi Fujita	Shū Matsubara	October 27, 2020
53	3	"Magic Angel Magi Lunatic Icchi"; Transliteration: "Majikku Tenshi Maji Hera Itchī" (Japanese: マジック天使 マジヘラ イッチー)	Takashi Andō; Yōichi Fujita	Shū Matsubara	October 27, 2020
Osomatsu, Karamatsu, and Jyushimatsu share their expectations for the new season. The Riceballs estimate the value of the sextuplets' friends, causing embarrassment and confusion. In a parody of classic Pierrot magical girl series, fantastic powers are given to the wrong girl.
54	4	"Ichimatsu Radio"; Transliteration: "Ichimatsu Rajio" (Japanese: 一松ラジオ)	Toshihiro Maeya	Shū Matsubara	November 3, 2020
54	4	"Unit Formed"; Transliteration: "Konbi Kessei" (Japanese: コンビ結成)	Toshihiro Maeya	Shū Matsubara	November 3, 2020
54	4	"Matsuyo's Trap"; Transliteration: "Matsuyo no Wana" (Japanese: 松代の罠)	Toshihiro Maeya	Shū Matsubara	November 3, 2020
Ichimatsu hosts his own in-home radio show, which may or may not be a figment of his imagination. Totoko and Nyaa learn more about each other after a bundle of joy is revealed. Matsuyo punishes the boys for grabbing late-night snacks in a most barbaric way.
55	5	"Well, Yeah..."; Transliteration: "Māna" (Japanese: まぁな)	Yūta Suzuki	Shū Matsubara	November 10, 2020
55	5	"The Way Home"; Transliteration: "Kaerimichi" (Japanese: 帰り道)	Yūta Suzuki	Shū Matsubara	November 10, 2020
Todomatsu and Karamatsu crush on a convenience store worker, and try to build the courage to ask her out. The brothers walk home from a wedding, expressing disappointment at themselves along the way.
56	6	"Touter"; Transliteration: "Kyakuhiki" (Japanese: 客引き)	Takahiro Ōtsuka	Shū Matsubara	November 17, 2020
56	6	"Optimization"; Transliteration: "Saitekika" (Japanese: 最適化)	Takahiro Ōtsuka	Shū Matsubara	November 17, 2020
56	6	"Massage"; Transliteration: "Massāji" (Japanese: マッサージ)	Takahiro Ōtsuka	Shū Matsubara	November 17, 2020
Iyami sells two salarymen short on a promiscuous shop. The Riceballs look for cats with Ichimatsu. Jyushimatsu gives Osomatsu a special, yet dangerous massage.
57	7	"Tidbits Collection 3"; Transliteration: "Kobore Banashi-shū 3" (Japanese: こぼれ話集3)	Yoshinori Odaka	Shū Matsubara	November 24, 2020
Another collection of short skits: Chibita gets a haircut from barber Todomatsu, Nyaa'a baby takes her first steps, astronauts Choromatsu and Todomatsu request to dock, Iyami encounters familiar-looking yōkai, Chibita uses wit, wisdom, and a protein shake in a jidaigeki tale, Osomatsu and Ichimatsu find out what their dad does for a living, Choromatsu and Karamatsu use the Riceballs' AI voice replication features to their perverted whims, and Jyushimatsu becomes Governor.
58	8	"To the South"; Transliteration: "Minami e" (Japanese: 南へ)	Ryū Yajima; Akihiro Izumi; Yoshinori Odaka; Yōichi Fujita	Shū Matsubara	December 1, 2020
58	8	"Mt. Takao"; Transliteration: "Takao-san" (Japanese: 高尾山)	Ryū Yajima; Akihiro Izumi; Yoshinori Odaka; Yōichi Fujita	Shū Matsubara	December 1, 2020
Dekapan and Dayon are drafted into a rousing aerial dogfight. Choromatsu takes his brothers on an impromptu day trip to Mount Takao.
59	9	"Sheeeh"; Transliteration: "Shē" (Japanese: シェー)	Hikaru Yamaguchi	Shū Matsubara	December 8, 2020
59	9	"Outfit"; Transliteration: "Ishō" (Japanese: 衣装)	Hikaru Yamaguchi	Shū Matsubara	December 8, 2020
59	9	"Let's Do Chores"; Transliteration: "Kaji o Yarō" (Japanese: 家事をやろう)	Hikaru Yamaguchi	Shū Matsubara	December 8, 2020
The Riceballs try to understand the meaning of "sheeeh". Totoko and Nyaa try out new threads. The Matsunos do chores.
60	10	"ZANSU"	Sayaka Yamai	Shū Matsubara	December 15, 2020 (Note: This episode did not air on the scheduled date as TV Tokyo live broadcast the 2020 U.S. Women's Open which was delayed due to heavy rain. The episode was still released in time on some streaming platforms and aired on TV Tokyo on December 22, 2020.)
60	10	"Werewolf"; Transliteration: "Jinrō" (Japanese: 人狼)	Sayaka Yamai	Shū Matsubara	December 15, 2020
Passion and love are on full display in a SASUKE-esque physical tournament. The Matsunos partake in the deduction game "Werewolf", with twists and turns along the way.
61	11	"Do It"; Transliteration: "Yareyo" (Japanese: やれよ)	Hikaru Murata	Shū Matsubara	December 29, 2020
61	11	"Pizza"; Transliteration: "Piza" (Japanese: ピザ)	Hikaru Murata	Shū Matsubara	December 29, 2020
The Riceballs, having discovered what "sheeeh" is, learn from Osomatsu and Karamatsu when an appropriate time to use such gag would be. Later, Todomatsu looks over a pizza menu, and asks his brothers for what their hypothetical orders would be, using their answers as a characteristic litmus test.
62	12	"AI"	Taketomo Ishikawa	Shū Matsubara	December 29, 2020 (Note: Episodes 11 and 12 aired together as an hour long special at 1:50 a.m. JST, 20 minutes after the original air time.)
The Riceballs, deemed inadequate for the sextuplets, are recalled. Having grown fond of them, the brothers set off on a quest to liberate them from their robotic servitude.
63	13	"Mr. HNYmatsu"; Transliteration: "Ake-omematsu-san" (Japanese: あけおめ松さん)	N/A	N/A	January 5, 2021
The Riceballs host a New Year's special detailing the events of the season so far.
64	14	"Pond Smelt Fishing"; Transliteration: "Wakasagi-tsuri" (Japanese: ワカサギ釣り)	Yūta Suzuki	Shū Matsubara	January 12, 2021
64	14	"Mortal Combat"; Transliteration: "Shitō" (Japanese: 死闘)	Yūta Suzuki	Shū Matsubara	January 12, 2021
64	14	"Sparkle Phantom Stream"; Transliteration: "Kirakira Fantomu Sutorīmu" (Japanese: キラキラ ファントム ストリーム)	Yūta Suzuki	Shū Matsubara	January 12, 2021
The sextuplets go fishing for pond smelt, but mysteriously disappear one by one. A heated snowball fight breaks out amongst the brothers. Choromatsu makes a groundbreaking discovery.
65	15	"Cosplaymatsu"; Transliteration: "Kosupurematsu" (Japanese: コスプレ松)	Toshihiro Maeya	Shū Matsubara	January 19, 2021
A collection of skits involving the characters in a variety of settings: suicidal police officer Ichimatsu interferes with a distress call, Chibita turns Hybrid Oden into a maid café, with frightening results, Osomatsu tries to avoid the death sentence for the ultimate crime of inappropriately farting, Choromatsu turns into mosquito, scummy old guy Osomatsu tells a depressing kamishibai tale of "The Tortoise and the Hare" to a group of kids, Karamatsu is a bartender who doesn't take orders, and Jyushimatsu is the proprietor of an otherworldly foreign restaurant.
66	16	"SaneCop"; Transliteration: "SaneKoppu" (Japanese: 実コップ)	Yoshinori Odaka	Shū Matsubara	January 26, 2021
66	16	"Nanmaider Attacks"; Transliteration: "Nanmaidā Raishū" (Japanese: ナンマイダー来襲)	Yoshinori Odaka	Shū Matsubara	January 26, 2021
Sanematsu, after the car accident that took his life, is resurrected in the form of a metallic salaryman. Much like RoboCop, he experiences visions of his previous Osomatsu megafan life. Iyami and Matsuzō make a They Live discovery when the sextuplets manage to get jobs.
67	17	"The Riceballs' New Routine"; Transliteration: "Omusubi no Shin Neta 1" (Japanese: オムスビの新ネタ1)	Noriko Itō; Takashi Igari; Sayaka Yamai	Shū Matsubara	February 2, 2021
67	17	"Imoni"; Transliteration: "Imoni" (Japanese: 芋煮)	Noriko Itō; Takashi Igari; Sayaka Yamai	Shū Matsubara	February 2, 2021
The Riceballs seek approval from the sextuplets for their new manzai act, with underwhelming results. Dekapan gets a craving for imoni, and invites everyone in town to a contest of making the best bowl.
68	18	"Just Don't"; Transliteration: "Yameteoke" (Japanese: やめておけ)	Takahiro Ōtsuka	Shū Matsubara	February 9, 2021
Nyaa, having just gotten over a bad marriage, becomes weirdly attracted to Osomatsu with everyone around telling her that it's a very bad idea to fall for him. Choromatsu, however, is devastated that his favorite idol would have eyes for the guy that embarrassed him at a meet-and-greet, and embarks on a journey of enlightenment.
69	19	"Are They Disbanding?"; Transliteration: "Kaisan no Kiki" (Japanese: 解散の危機)	Hikaru Murata	Shū Matsubara	February 16, 2021
69	19	"Sumo Stable"; Transliteration: "Sumō Heya" (Japanese: すもう部屋)	Hikaru Murata	Shū Matsubara	February 16, 2021
69	19	"Dogs"; Transliteration: "Inu" (Japanese: 犬)	Hikaru Murata	Shū Matsubara	February 16, 2021
The Riceballs have doubts in their manzai act, but Osomatsu and Choromatsu help them out. Tiny Todomatsu joins a sumo stable and learns from his fellow rikishi the way of the sport. Jyushimatsu inadvertently switches bodies with a dog, and must rely on Ichimatsu to make things right.
70	20	"Choromatsu Memorial Hall"; Transliteration: "Choromatsu Kinen-kan" (Japanese: チョロ松記念館)	Taketomo Ishikawa	Shū Matsubara	February 23, 2021
70	20	"Ear Cleaning"; Transliteration: "Mimikaki" (Japanese: 耳かき)	Taketomo Ishikawa	Shū Matsubara	February 23, 2021
70	20	"Persimmons"; Transliteration: "Kaki" (Japanese: 柿)	Taketomo Ishikawa	Shū Matsubara	February 23, 2021
Choromatsu cuts the ribbon to a museum showcasing his "greatest" moments in the hopes future generations will look to him as a hero. Osomatsu gives Karamatsu an ear cleaning, but doesn't know his own strength with the pick. A terminally-ill Hatabō awaits the last persimmon to fall off the tree outside his window, believing that he will die when it does. Doctor Iyami, hoping to get away with medical malpractice without touching a patient, tries his best to bring the fruit down.
71	21	"Is This Okay?"; Transliteration: "Ii no ka na" (Japanese: いいのかな)	Toshihiro Maeya	Shū Matsubara	March 2, 2021
71	21	"Greenroom"; Transliteration: "Gakuya" (Japanese: 楽屋)	Toshihiro Maeya	Shū Matsubara	March 2, 2021
71	21	"Totoderella"; Transliteration: "Totoderera" (Japanese: トトデレラ)	Toshihiro Maeya	Shū Matsubara	March 2, 2021
Choromatsu and Ichimatsu ponder the semantics of "a long time" while hanging out at the convenience store. At the A-1 Grand Prix green room, the Riceballs make conversation with their robotic manzai colleagues. The story of "Cinderella" unfolds for Totoko, who is the target of Prince Nyaa's search.
72	22	"I Found This"; Transliteration: "Hirotta" (Japanese: 拾った)	Yoshifumi Sasahara	Shū Matsubara	March 9, 2021
72	22	"Wannabe Detectives"; Transliteration: "Yaritai Keiji" (Japanese: やりたい刑事)	Yoshifumi Sasahara	Shū Matsubara	March 9, 2021
72	22	"Hide-and-Seek"; Transliteration: "Kakurenbo" (Japanese: かくれんぼ)	Yoshifumi Sasahara	Shū Matsubara	March 9, 2021
Jyushimatsu finds ¥100 on the ground, but is worried about if it's the right amount of money to turn into the police. A parody of police procedurals starring Osomatsu and Jyushimatsu as overdramatic officers plays out. The sextuplets are bored, and decide to play a game of hide-and-seek that doesn't go as planned.
73	23	"Contract Renewals"; Transliteration: "Keiyaku Kōkai" (Japanese: 契約更改)	Yūta Suzuki	Shū Matsubara	March 16, 2021
73	23	"Shopping"; Transliteration: "Kaidashi" (Japanese: 買い出し)	Yūta Suzuki	Shū Matsubara	March 16, 2021
73	23	"Friend"; Transliteration: "Tomo" (Japanese: 友)	Yūta Suzuki	Shū Matsubara	March 16, 2021
The sextuplets meet with the show's production committee to renew their contracts for a future season, but don't seem too keen on how the current season has been doing to warrant it. The brothers go clothes shopping at their regular place. Choromatsu meets up with his friend from high school, reminiscing about a dark incident that only they knew about.
74	24	"New Osomatsu Returns"; Transliteration: "Kaette Kita Shin Osomatsu" (Japanese: 帰ってきた新おそ松)	Yoshinori Odaka; Hikaru Murata	Shū Matsubara	March 23, 2021
74	24	"A-1 Grand Prix"; Transliteration: "Ē-Wan Guran Puri" (Japanese: A-1グランプリ)	Yoshinori Odaka; Hikaru Murata	Shū Matsubara	March 23, 2021
After being arrested for cocaine possession, New Osomatsu returns to get his revenge on Osomatsu, tearing down city blocks in the process. The A-1 Grand Prix has arrived, and all the automated comedians are raring to go. The Riceballs are expecting a good reception, but have a backup plan for if they bomb.
75	25	"Bored"; Transliteration: "Hima" (Japanese: ひま)	Hikaru Yamaguchi; Yōichi Fujita	Shū Matsubara	March 30, 2021
The cherry blossoms are blooming, and the brothers get an idea to go viewing. However, they get a little sidetracked, and spend the day around town with their neighbors.

=== Season 4 (2025) ===
No. overall	No. in season	Title	Directed by	Written by	Original release date
76	1	"It's Starting Again"; Transliteration: "Mata Hajimaru Zansu" (Japanese: また始まるざんす)	Ryosuke Higashi	Shu Matsubara	July 9, 2025
On Tanabata, the sextuplets and their neighbors go about an average summer day, and celebrate the holiday's festivities later that night.
77	2	"Watermelon Alien"; Transliteration: "Suika Hoshibito" (Japanese: スイカ星人)	Tsuneo Suzuki; Takeshi Nakano	Shu Matsubara	July 16, 2025
The sextuplets go out of their way to find a watermelon after they get a craving for the fruit, only to be swept up in an invasion plan by watermelon-themed aliens with some of them under their extraterrestrial control.
78	3	"Thunderstorms and Crew Cuts"; Transliteration: "Raiu to Kakugari" (Japanese: 雷雨と角刈り)	Yuki Morita; Ichii Ippei	Shu Matsubara	July 23, 2025
When a thunderstorm puts the brothers' plans of going to the beach to bed, Ichimatsu comes home with a mysterious bad new crew-cut hairstyle.
79	4	"Temple Festival"; Transliteration: "En'nichi" (Japanese: 縁日)	Nene Futamura	Shu Matsubara	July 30, 2025
A temple festival is underway in the town, and there's an eerie feeling lingering for the Riceballs, Nyaa, and her daughter.
80	5	"Rest / Fishing Hermit"; Transliteration: "Tsuri Sen'nin" (Japanese: つり仙人)	Kentaro Mizuno	Shu Matsubara	August 6, 2025
After carrying the omikoshi for the temple festival, the brothers must get rest to treat their injuries. Later, a pair of fishermen (Todomatsu and Karamatsu) encounter a fishing hermit (Jyushimatsu) who might not be as good as he claims.
81	6	"Fans and Time Machines"; Transliteration: "Senpūki to Taimu Mashin" (Japanese: 扇風機とタイムマシン)	Yusaku Kikuchi	Shu Matsubara	August 13, 2025
After the sextuplets' fan breaks, they take Dekapan's time machine for a trip to recover their fan from before it was broken, with each attempt making the whole plan worse.
82	7	"Storytime, Jo"; Transliteration: "Monogatari Daji ~Yo" (Japanese: 物語だじょ)	Shu Matsubara	Eiji Yasuhiko	August 20, 2025
A series of skits based on classic children's tales, with parodies of A Dog of Flanders, "Snow White", "Hansel and Gretel", and "The Crane Repays a Debt".
83	8	"Ichimatsu and the Muddy Cat"; Transliteration: "Ichimatsu to Doro Neko" (Japanese: 一松とドロネコ)	Shu Matsubara	Haru Watanabe	August 27, 2025
Ichimatsu befriends a thief cat who scrounges for food in humanlike ways and tries to teach about what's right and wrong. However, the cat, now named Nekomaru, goes back to his old ways, and Ichimatsu must find a way to rehabilitate his new buddy.
84	9	"The Idiot Series"; Transliteration: "Baka Shirīzu" (Japanese: バカシリーズ)	Koreko Nagai; Yuki Morita	Shu Matsubara	September 3, 2025
A collection of skits parodying various things you might see on TV.
85	10	"Iyami and the Shy Little Aliens"; Transliteration: "Iyami to Hikkomiji an Seijin" (Japanese: イヤミとひっこみじあん星人)	Hitomi Ezoe	Shu Matsubara	September 10, 2025
After Iyami's space adventure, he takes it upon himself to enter the burgeoning market of extraterrestrial tourism by starting up a maid cafe with a pair of multiplying aliens. However, the two are considered illegal immigrants, so Iyami and the sextuplets must find a way to help their shy new friends obtain citizenship.
86	11	"The Sextuplets Have the Same Dream"; Transliteration: "Muttsu-ko wa Onaji Yume o Miru" (Japanese: 6つ子は同じ夢を見る)	Ryosuke Higashi	Shu Matsubara	September 17, 2025
Two stories of dreams the sextuplets mysteriously all had at the same time, both involving motifs of their identical bodies undergoing strange transformations.
87	12	"The End of Summer"; Transliteration: "Natsu no Owari" (Japanese: 夏の終わり)	Nene Futamura; Yuki Morita; Shigeru Fukase	Shu Matsubara	September 24, 2025
Chibita announces that he's leaving the country and closing up shop for Hybrid Oden to feed kids overseas. Osomatsu, who has relied on Chibita and his stand for many a lonely hungry night, doesn't know how to accept this big change, and grows selfish.
88	13	"The Matsuno Ten" (Japanese: ザ・マツノテン)	Unknown	Shu Matsubara	June 6, 2026 (Note: Due to a prolonged delay involving legal permission for the songs and artists parodied, the episode officially premiered at the 10th Anniversary theatrical event on June 6th, 2026.)
A take-off of The Best Ten with the Osomatsu cast, each of them assuming the roles of famous musicians of the 70s and 80s with parodic performances to boot.

=== Specials ===
No.	Title	Directed by	Written by	Original release date
3.5	"Matsu Juice"; Transliteration: "Matsu Jiru" (Japanese: 松汁)	Nanako Shimazaki; Hiromichi Matano	Michiko Yokote; Yukio Okada	January 29, 2016 (OVA)
3.5	"Virgin Heroes"; Transliteration: "Dōtei na Hīrō" (Japanese: 童貞なヒーロー)	Nanako Shimazaki; Hiromichi Matano	Michiko Yokote; Yukio Okada	January 29, 2016 (OVA)
The Idol Matsunos participate in various activities that serve no purpose other than to promote a dubious health product. Meanwhile, the actual brothers become Sentai heroes to help Choromatsu, only to find themselves helpless at the sight of a social barbecue.
25.5	"An Anecdote With Horses"; Transliteration: "Ouma de Kobanashi" (Japanese: おうまでこばなし)	Hikaru Yamaguchi	Shū Matsubara	December 12, 2016
A series of horse racing skits produced in collaboration with the Japan Racing Association. The brothers take Totoko to her first horse race, but have trouble getting her to understand how betting actually works. Hatabou sings a song while Choromatsu tries to keep the others from entering vehicles and other animals into a horse race. Later, the brothers discuss their betting methods, Dayon struggles to get his horse to move, and Iyami decides to buy his own horse. Finally, everyone participates in a deadly obstacle race, getting obliterated within moments.
87.5	"Fresh. Ugly. Change."; Transliteration: "Sō・Shū・Hen" (Japanese: 爽・醜・変)	Yusaku Kikuchi	Pierrot Films	October 1, 2025
An hour-long special featuring clips of favorite episodes voted on by fans in celebration of the series' 10th anniversary.
