= Kazuyoshi Torii =

Japanese manga artist and professor (1946–2022)

- とりいかずよし
- Born: 12 November 1946; Kamata, Eda-gun, Aichi Prefecture, Allied-occupied Japan
- Died: 9 February 2022 (aged 75); Nagoya, Aichi Prefecture, Japan
- Occupation: Manga artist

Kazuyoshi Torii (Japanese: とりいかずよし, 12 November 1946 – 9 February 2022) was a Japanese manga artist and university professor.

== Life and career ==
Born in Kamata, a defunct village today part of Okazaki, Torii started his career as an assistant of Fujio Akatsuka. He made his official debut as a mangaka in 1968 in Weekly Shōnen Sunday with the manga Kuchinashi Inu ("Dog With No Mouth"). He is best known for the provoking, taboo-free serializated manga Toilet Hakase ("Professor Toilet"). The manga debuted in Weekly Shōnen Jump and sold over 10 million copies.

Besides his activity as an artist, Torii was a manga professor at the Aichi Shukutoku University. He died of pancreatic cancer in Nagoya on 9 February 2022, at the age of 75.
