= Osomatsu-kun: Hachamecha Gekijō =

1988 video game

- Cover art
- Developer: Sega
- Publisher: Sega
- Platform: Sega Mega Drive
- Release: JP: December 24, 1988
- Genre: Platform
- Mode: Single-player

Osomatsu-kun: Hachamecha Gekijō (おそ松くん はちゃめちゃ劇場; "Osomatsu-kun: Nonsense Theater") is a platform video game by Sega, which was released in 1988 for the Sega Mega Drive. An early Mega Drive title, it never saw a release outside of Japan. The game was based on the manga Osomatsu-kun by Fujio Akatsuka, and acts as a promotion for the anime adaptation that premiered the same year. The player controlled the title character and encountered many of the series' characters in a strange, comical world.

== Gameplay ==
Confronting one of the game's several incarnations of Chibita as a mini-boss

The player controls Osomatsu, leader of the sextuplets, through a total of three stages, armed with a short-range slingshot. Each stage has a distinct path the player needs to follow in order to proceed. The stages are divided into a number of separate segments, with Osomatsu traversing between them in various ways, such as going through doors, falling down pits, flying on balloons, or riding a golden cloud. In order to fight Iyami, the boss of each stage, the player must locate and defeat the miniboss, portrayed by either Chibita or Dekapan. Every time a boss or miniboss is defeated, Osomatsu's maximum health and slingshot range both increase.

The player can enter shops run by Totoko, where they can purchase power-ups with collectible yellow ribbons. The shops also have minigames, such as a slot machine and a short pathfinder. The player starts each game with three lives and cannot earn any continues. Additional lives are awarded by collecting six 1-Up Cards. Defeating enemies can cause them to randomly drop ribbons, health items, or (on rare occasions) 1-Up Cards.

== Reception ==
Reception

Review score
Publication	Score
Famitsu	23/40

The game was poorly received due to the maze-like level design, frustrating controls and short length. Despite this, the game has obtained a cult following as an infamous kusoge.
