= Mr. Osomatsu =

2015 comedy television anime by Yōichi Fujita

- Key visual for the series
- おそ松さん
- Genre: Animated sitcom; Slice of life; Surreal comedy; Parody
- Based on: Osomatsu-kun by Fujio Akatsuka
- Developed by: Shū Matsubara
- Directed by: Yoichi Fujita (S1–3); Yoshinori Odaka (S4)
- Music by: Yukari Hashimoto
- Country of origin: Japan
- Original language: Japanese
- No. of episodes: 87 + 3 specials (list of episodes)

Production
- Animators: Studio Pierrot (season 1-3); Pierrot Films (season 4)
- Production company: Mr. Osomatsu Production Committee (Note: Label consisting of various companies)

Original release
- Network: TV Tokyo, TVO, TVA, AT-X, BS TV Tokyo (S1–3); TVh (S2–3); TXN (TV Tokyo) (S4)
- Release: October 6, 2015 – October 1, 2025

Related
- Manga
- Written by: Masako Shitara
- Published by: Shueisha
- Magazine: You (2016–2018); Cookie (2018–2020)
- Original run: January 15, 2016 – November 26, 2020
- Volumes: 10
Further information
Novel
Written by	Yuu Mitsuru
Illustrated by	Naoyuki Asano
Published by	Jump J-Books
Published	July 29, 2016
Video game
Osomatsu-san the Game: Hachamecha Shūshoku Advice – Dead or Work
Publisher	Idea Factory
Genre	Adventure
Platform	PlayStation Vita
Released	June 29, 2017
Original net animation
dMatsu-san
Released	January 9, 2018 – March 27, 2018
Episodes	12
Anime film
Mr. Osomatsu: The Movie
Directed by	Yoichi Fujita
Written by	Shū Matsubara
Music by	Yukari Hashimoto
Studio	Studio Pierrot
Released	March 15, 2019
Runtime	108 minutes
Live-action film
Directed by	Tsutomu Hanabusa
Produced by	Daiki Sugawara
Written by	Ryōichi Tsuchiya
Released	March 25, 2022
Runtime	111 minutes
Anime film
Mr. Osomatsu: The Hipipo Tribe and the Glistening Fruit
Directed by	Yoshinori Odaka
Written by	Shū Matsubara
Music by	Yukari Hashimoto
Studio	Studio Pierrot
Released	July 8, 2022
Runtime	68 minutes
Anime film
Mr. Osomatsu: The Soul's Takoyaki Party and the Legendary Sleepover Party
Directed by	Hikaru Yamaguchi
Written by	Shū Matsubara
Music by	Yukari Hashimoto
Studio	Studio Pierrot
Released	July 21, 2023
Runtime	58 minutes
Anime television series
Matsu Inu
Directed by	Tetsuya Endo
Written by	Tetsuya Endo; Hitomi Ogawa
Music by	Yukari Hashimoto; Ruka Kawada; Tetsuya Shitara; Yayoi Sekimukai
Studio	Point Pictures
Original network	TV Tokyo, AT-X
Original run	October 7, 2023 – December 23, 2023
Episodes	12

Mr. Osomatsu (Japanese: おそ松さん, Hepburn: Osomatsu-san) is a Japanese adult comedy anime produced by Studio Pierrot, based on Fujio Akatsuka's 1962 manga series, Osomatsu-kun. Celebrating Akatsuka's eightieth birthday, the series follows the sextuplet Matsuno brothers from the original series as 20-something adults, with a more ribald sense of humor compared to Osomatsu-kun.

The first season aired in Japan between October 2015 and March 2016, with a special episode airing in December 2016. A second season aired between October 2017 and March 2018, followed by a third season from October 2020 to March 2021. A fourth season aired from July to October 2025, with an extended delay on the final episode, which premiered in June 2026. The first two seasons have been licensed in the Americas by Viz Media.

A manga adaptation by Masako Shitaro was serialized in Shueisha's You magazine from January 2016 to October 2018. It was then transferred to Shueisha's Cookie magazine, where it continued serialization from November 2018 to November 2020.

Three theatrical anime films based on the series premiered in March 2019, July 2022, and July 2023.

A spin-off short anime series titled Matsu Inu, involving alternate versions of the sextuplets as dogs, aired from October to December 2023.

== Premise ==
The original Osomatsu-kun series followed the Matsuno brothers; Osomatsu, Karamatsu, Choromatsu, Ichimatsu, Jyushimatsu, and Todomatsu, who are all identical sextuplets who cause mischief. Mr. Osomatsu depicts the brothers as being ten years older than their original counterparts (with the action taking place in a contemporary setting). All of the brothers have now grown up into lazy NEETs, with each brother having developed their own distinguishing personality. The series follows the brothers in their everyday (and occasionally made up) lives.

== Characters ==
=== Matsuno siblings ===
The Matsuno siblings as depicted in Mr. Osomatsu. From left to right: Todomatsu, Osomatsu, Karamatsu, Choromatsu, Ichimatsu, and Jyushimatsu.

Osomatsu Matsuno (松野 おそ松, Matsuno Osomatsu)
Voiced by: Takahiro Sakurai (Japanese); Billy Kametz (English)
The eldest of the sextuplets and self-proclaimed leader of the group. An avid gambler, he spends his time playing pachinko and betting on horses. Self-centered and clueless. His trademark color is red.
Karamatsu Matsuno (松野 カラ松, Matsuno Karamatsu)
Voiced by: Yuichi Nakamura (Japanese); Ray Chase (English)
The second born of the sextuplets. Believes himself to be cooler and more popular than he really is and calls his fangirls "Karamatsu Girls." He occasionally adds English words into his sentences. Conceited, yet a bit of a doormat. His distinguishing feature is his thick eyebrows. His trademark color is blue, though he occasionally sports a leather jacket and sunglasses.
Choromatsu Matsuno (松野 チョロ松, Matsuno Choromatsu)
Voiced by: Hiroshi Kamiya (Japanese); Sean Chiplock (English)
The third born and most responsible of the sextuplets. Often acts as straight man to his siblings, but also acts as an otaku. Feigning competency. His distinguishing features are his angular mouth, smaller pupils, and his lack of a cowlick. His trademark color is green.
Ichimatsu Matsuno (松野 一松, Matsuno Ichimatsu)
Voiced by: Jun Fukuyama (Japanese); Kyle McCarley (English)
The fourth born of the sextuplets and the sharp-tongued loner of the group. A cat-loving vessel of pure, unbridled ennui. His distinguishing features are his tired eyes, scruffy hair, hunched back, and trademark color of purple.
Jyushimatsu Matsuno (松野 十四松, Matsuno Jūshimatsu)
Voiced by: Daisuke Ono (Japanese); Michael Sinterniklaas (English)
The fifth born of the sextuplets. He is a very energetic baseball fan, but also quite the airhead. Somehow, the most mysterious of the brothers. He has a wide open mouth, and a single cowlick compared to the other siblings' two. His trademark color is yellow.
Todomatsu Matsuno (松野 トド松, Matsuno Todomatsu)
Voiced by: Miyu Irino (Japanese); Max Mittelman (English)
The most outgoing of the sextuplets. Often uses his cuteness as the youngest brother to manipulate others. A social butterfly in touch with his feminine side. He has a smaller, catlike mouth and bigger pupils. His trademark color is pink.

=== Supporting cast ===
Some of the supporting characters. From left to right: Chibita, Totoko, Hatabo, Dekapan and Dayon.

Totoko (トト子)
Voiced by: Aya Endō (Japanese); Cassandra Lee Morris (English)
The so-called heroine of the series, who desperately strives to become a fish-themed idol in order to gain fame and fortune. She has a vicious side when annoyed or side-lined, and is often vainly preoccupied with her image.
Iyami (イヤミ)
Voiced by: Kenichi Suzumura (Japanese); Keith Silverstein (English)
A gaudy con artist who was a former enemy to the sextuplets as kids. Though not as involved in get-rich-quick schemes with them as adults, he has fallen into homelessness and lives under a bridge.
Chibita (チビ太)
Voiced by: Sachi Kokuryu (Japanese); Alex Cazares (English)
Former rival of the sextuplets who now runs an oden stand that the Matsuno brothers frequently visit. Has escaped his childhood poverty and acts as the voice of reason to his non-working regulars.
Matsuzo Matsuno (松野 松造, Matsuno Matsuzō) and Matsuyo Matsuno (松野 松代, Matsuno Matsuyo)
Voiced by: Kazuhiko Inoue (Matsuzo), Kujira (Matsuyo) (Japanese); Keith Silverstein (Matsuzo), Mick Wingert (Matsuyo) (English)
The sextuplets' malaise-ridden parents, whom they still rely on and live with as adults. Matsuyo is a stay-at-home mother, while Matsuzō is the bread-winning salaryman.
Hatabō (ハタ坊)
Voiced by: Momoko Saitō (Japanese); Cherami Leigh (English)
A naive, childlike man with a flag in his head who hasn't changed much from when he was a naive, childlike kid. Multibillionaire who is later removed from his company. His transportation of choice is his tricycle.
Dekapan (デカパン)
Voiced by: Yōji Ueda (Japanese); Ray Chase (English)
A genial scientist who conducts experiments on the town in the name of progress, all the while wearing nothing but a pair of striped boxers.
Dayōn (ダヨーン)
Voiced by: Nobuo Tobita (Japanese); Keith Silverstein (English)
Formerly a bit player, he has become Dekapan's big-mouthed lab assistant.
Nyaa Hashimoto (橋本にゃー, Hashimoto Nyaa)
Voiced by: Nanami Yamashita (Japanese); Cherami Leigh (English)
A cat-themed idol whom Choromatsu is an avid fan of. Rival of Totoko, she later becomes a single mother in the third season, retiring from the performing scene.
Salmon (鮭, Shake) and Pickled Plum (梅, Ume)
Voiced by: Kazutomi Yamamoto
Two AI robots that are sent to help the sextuplets in their everyday lives at the beginning of the third season. After rejecting their programming, they set out to achieve their dream of becoming award-winning manzai comedians.

=== Other characters ===
Shounosuke Hijirisawa (聖澤 庄之助, Hijirisawa Shōnosuke)
Voiced by: Yōji Ueda
A typically quiet bit player who makes random running appearances throughout the series, either as a joke, prop, or Easter egg.
Nozomi Takahashi (高橋 のぞみ)
Voiced by: Rina Sato
The sextuplets' high school classmate with a pair of round glasses who admires them for who they were in their high school years. Only appears in the theatrical film.
F6
Voiced by: Takahiro Sakurai, Yuichi Nakamura, Hiroshi Kamiya, Jun Fukuyama, Daisuke Ono, and Miyu Irino (Japanese); Billy Kametz, Ray Chase, Sean Chiplock, Kyle McCarley, Michael Sinterniklaas, and Max Mittelman (English)
Ikemen idol versions of the sextuplets that serve to parody bishōnen series popular amongst young women, of note Uta no Prince-sama. Alter-egos created to better adapt to "modern anime" in the now-unavailable first episode, later retconned to be a form the sextuplets take after ingesting a supplement.
Sanematsu (実松, Sanematsu)
Voiced by: Daisuke Ono
An average salaryman in a realistic world who suffers from the delusion that he's the seventh Matsuno brother. Killed in a car crash, he is later resurrected as a RoboCop pastiche.
Godmatsu (神松, Kamimatsu) and Evilmatsu (悪松, Akumatsu)
Voiced by: Kenji Nojima (Godmatsu), Tomokazu Sugita (Evilmatsu) (Japanese); Johnny Yong Bosch (Godmatsu) (English)
The technical seventh and eighth Matsuno brothers, with Godmatsu a perfect saint-like being formed from the goodness that has fallen off the sextuplets, and Evilmatsu a giant shadowy creature arisen from the sextuplets' badness.
Girlymatsus (じょし松, Joshimatsu)
Voiced by: Takahiro Sakurai, Yuichi Nakamura, Hiroshi Kamiya, Jun Fukuyama, Daisuke Ono, and Miyu Irino (Japanese); Billy Kametz, Ray Chase, Sean Chiplock, Kyle McCarley, Michael Sinterniklaas, and Max Mittelman (English)
Six working gal pals who act as alternate female counterparts to the sextuplets, though with the major differences of them having jobs.

== Production and release ==
Mr. Osomatsu, produced by Pierrot and animated by their Studio Pierrot division, aired between October 6, 2015, and March 29, 2016. Outside of Japan, the series aired in simulcast on Crunchyroll; marking the first media in the Osomatsu franchise to receive an official English release. The series' first episode, which featured multiple parodies, was removed from streaming sites on November 12, 2015, and is replaced by an original video animation in its home video release, occasionally referred to as "Episode 3.5". Additionally, the third episode, which features a crude parody of Anpanman, was edited for its BS Japan broadcast and is altered in its home video release.

In September 2016, animation director Kanchi Suzuki revealed on his Twitter account that he was interested in making a second season. A special episode, produced in collaboration with the Japan Racing Association, aired on December 12, 2016. A second season was announced in April 2017, having previously been teased in a listing for the Blu-ray release of "Mr. Osomatsu JRA Special 2016" (おそ松さん おうまでこばなし, Osomatsu-san Ouma de Kobanashi), and aired between October 3, 2017, and March 27, 2018.

An anime theatrical film for the franchise was announced in August 2018, with the main staff and cast from the television series returning to reprise their roles. Titled Osomatsu-san the Movie (えいがのおそ松さん, Eiga no Osomatsu-san), the film was released on March 15, 2019.

A new 7-episode short series was announced in February 2019, with the main staff and cast from the television series returning to reprise their roles. The shorts ran from March 1 to March 15, 2019.

A third season was announced in July 2020, which aired from October 13, 2020, to March 30, 2021.

Two new animated theatrical films were announced in June 2021. The first film, titled Mr. Osomatsu: Hipipo-Zoku to Kagayaku Kajitsu, premiered on July 8, 2022. Yoshinori Odaka is directing the film, with the main staff and cast reprising their roles. The second film, titled Mr. Osomatsu: The Soul's Takoyaki Party and the Legendary Sleepover Party, premiered on July 21, 2023.

A spin-off anime series based on a line of dog character products, called Matsu Inu, based on the series was announced in August 2023. The series is animated by Point Pictures and directed by Tetsuya Endo, with Endo handling series scripts along with Hitomi Ogawa, Yūki Nagashima designing the characters based on FuRyu's original character designs, and Yukari Hashimoto returning to compose the music alongside Ruka Kawada, Tetsuya Shitara, and Yayoi Sekimukai. It aired within TV Tokyo's Eeny Meeny Miney Moe program from October 7 to December 23, 2023.

A fourth season was announced in June 2024. The second studio of Pierrot, responsible for said show rebranded to the Pierrot Films name, which was announced on July 5, 2024, a month later and would be handling animation production of that season. The season is directed by Yoshinori Odaka and aired from July 8 to October 1, 2025, on TV Tokyo and its affiliates.

=== Distribution ===
In Australia and New Zealand, Madman Entertainment released the first season on DVD on December 7, 2016, and made the series available on AnimeLab.

At their panel in Otakon 2017, Viz Media announced that they have licensed the first two seasons in North, Central and South America and simulcast the second season. Viz released the first season in North America on Blu-Ray on March 9, 2021. It does not include episode 1. The dub was initially written (including episode 1) and directed by Patrick Seitz, who both left the project for other commitments, leaving Christopher Bevins to re-write and re-record the series minus the first episode. Viz Media released the second season on Blu-ray on September 14, 2021.

== Other media ==
A manga adaptation of Mr. Osomatsu, illustrated by Masako Shitara, began serialization in Shueisha's You magazine on January 15, 2016. It transferred to Shueisha's Cookie magazine in November 2018 after You ended its publication in October of the same year. The manga ended in Cookie on November 26, 2020. A novelization of the anime, written by Yū Mitsuru and illustrated by Naoyuki Asano, was published on July 29, 2016. A serialization focusing on the series' collaboration with the Ultraman franchise, Ultramatsu, is an ongoing manga published on LINE that takes place after the Season 1 finale.

Bandai Namco Entertainment released a party game based on the series for the Nintendo 3DS on December 22, 2016. An otome game developed by Idea Factory was released for the PlayStation Vita in 2017.

A live action adaptation movie, titled The Osomatsu-san Movie (えいがおそ松さん, Eiga Osomatsu-san), was announced in August 2021. The film was the first official live-action iteration of the franchise, directed by Tsutomu Hanabusa and starring the nine member boy band Snow Man as the Matsuno sextuplets with members Ryōta Miyadate, Shōta Watanabe, and Ryōhei Abe as original characters Period, End, and Close respectively. The group also provided the film's theme song "Brother Beat." The film premiered on March 25, 2022.

A second live-action film titled The Osomatsu-san Movie: The Plan to Turn Humanity Into Scum!!!!!? (えいがおそ松さん 人類クズ化計画！！！！！？, Eiga Osomatsu-san: Jinrui Kuzu-ka Keikaku!!!!!?) was announced in June 2025. Unlike the first live-action film, the cast now features the members of boy band Ae! Group, and Takuya Nishimura of junior group Howzit. Former Ae! Group member Keita Richard Kusama, who portrays Jyushimatsu in the film, was arrested in October 2025 on suspicion of indecent exposure, leading to both his departure from the group in November and the film's subsequent indefinite hold, later a delay from the initially-announced January 9, 2026, to summer. The film released on June 12, 2026.
