= Yoshiko Tsuchida =

Japanese manga artist (1948–2023)

- 土田よしこ
- Born: 26 February 1948; Musashino, Tokyo, Japan
- Died: 15 September 2023 (aged 75); Tokyo, Japan
- Occupation: Mangaka

Yoshiko Tsuchida (Japanese: 土田よしこ, 26 February 1948 – 15 September 2023) was a Japanese manga artist and writer. Often described as a "unique" figure among Japanese manga artists, because of her style she has been referred to as "a female Fujio Akatsuka".

== Life and career ==
Born in Musashino, Tokyo, since her childhood Tsuchida was a keen manga reader, and especially a fan of Shigeru Sugiura and Osamu Tezuka. After her high school graduation she started her career as an assistant of Fujio Akatsuka at Fujio Pro. She made her debut as a manga creator in 1968, with the series Harenchi-kun, published in the magazine Shōsetsu June.

Specialized in nonsense gag cartoons featuring parodies of traditional shōjo manga heroines, Tsuchida is best known for her manga Tsuruhime-ja! ("It's Princess Tsuru!"), which ran from 1973 to 1979 in the magazine Margaret and in 1990 was adapted into a Nippon TV anime series with the same name. The manga was awarded the Excellence Award at the fourth Japan Cartoonists Association Awards. Tsuchida died on 15 September 2023, at the age of 75.
