= Geisters =

Japanese anime television series

- Geisters DVD Cover

ガイスターズ FRACTIONS OF THE EARTH (Gaisutāzu Furakushonsu obu za Āsu)
- Genre: Action, Drama, Science fiction
- Created by: Jang Jong-Geun
- Anime television series
- Directed by: Koji Itoh
- Produced by: Eiji Kanaoka; Kazunori Takagi; Takumi Ogawa; Masaru Umehara
- Written by: Naruhiko Adachi; Tokiko Inoue
- Music by: Kenji Kawai
- Studio: Plum
- Original network: MBC (South Korea); TV Osaka (Japan)
- Original run: October 6, 2001 – March 30, 2002
- Episodes: 26

Geisters (ガイスターズ FRACTIONS OF THE EARTH, Gaisutāzu Furakushonsu obu za Āsu) is a 26-episode anime series. The series aired on MBC TV from January 6, to March 30, 2001, then in Japan on TV Tokyo from October 6, 2001, to March 30, 2002.

== Storyline ==
Earth AD 2057

Four hundred years ago, it became certain than an asteroid would collide with Earth and the extinction of the race was at hand. Mankind spent 10 years devising a plan to survive. The Dobias went out to live in space while the Shioru forged a new world underground. Three hundred years ago, mankind returned to the surface from beyond the stars and beneath the ground.

But the surface was not what it once was, and mankind was forced to battle for supremacy with a new life form born from the ashes of destruction. Man was no longer at the top of the food chain. That spot was occupied by the Siliconians, creatures who roam the landscape searching for prey. Meanwhile, the Dobias—scientists and nobles—and the Shioru—farmers and nomads—are engaged in a cold war over the limited remaining resources, a cold war that threatens to turn hot.

Amidst this battle of survival between creature and man are Dean Honos, Alcion Fama, Cris Vesta, Victor Deicius, and Shai Tanna. Together, they are the Geisters, the Dobias' ultimate fighting force. They are armed powers, abilities, and weapons beyond normal humans, and they are the last hope for mankind.
