= Osomatsu-kun =

Media franchise

- DVD box cover of the 1988 anime series

おそ松くん
- Genre: Comedy; Surreal comedy Slapstick
- Manga
- Written by: Fujio Akatsuka
- Published by: Shogakukan; Kodansha; Shōnen Gahosha
- Magazine: Weekly Shōnen Sunday; (April 15, 1962–January 15, 1969); Shōnen King; (March 19, 1972–December 24, 1973); Comic BomBom; (November 1987–March 1990); Monthly TV Magazine; (February 1988–January 1990)
- Original run: April 15, 1962 – January 15, 1969 (Sunday version)
- Volumes: 34
- Anime television series
- Directed by: Makoto Nagasawa
- Music by: Urato Watanabe; Keitaro Miho
- Studio: Children's Corner; Studio Zero
- Original network: MBS, NET
- Original run: February 5, 1966 – March 25, 1967
- Episodes: 56
- Anime television series
- Directed by: Akira Shigino
- Produced by: Kenji Shimizu (Fuji TV); Kyotaro Kimura (Yomiko)
- Music by: Yusuke Honma
- Studio: Studio Pierrot
- Licensed by: NA: Discotek Media
- Original network: FNS (Fuji TV)
- Original run: February 13, 1988 – December 30, 1989
- Episodes: 86
- Anime film

Osomatsu-kun: Suika no Hoshi Kara Konnichiwa zansu!
- Directed by: Ryuichi Okumura
- Written by: Tokio Tsuchiya
- Music by: Yusuke Honma
- Studio: Studio Pierrot
- Released: March 18, 1989
- Runtime: 25 minutes
- Anime television series
- Mr. Osomatsu (2015 reboot)

Osomatsu-kun (Japanese: おそ松くん) is a comedy manga series by Fujio Akatsuka which ran in Shogakukan's Weekly Shōnen Sunday magazine from 1962 to 1969. The series revolves around a group of sextuplet brothers who cause all sorts of mischief. It has been adapted into two different anime series of the same name, the first of which was produced by Studio Zero in 1966, and the second by Studio Pierrot in 1988. A new anime series by Pierrot, the adult-oriented Mr. Osomatsu, began airing in October 2015 to celebrate Akatsuka's 80th birthday, with a manga adaptation by Masako Shitara serialized in Shueisha's You magazine from January 2016.

This series helped establish Akatsuka's reputation as a gag comic artist, long before his other popular manga, Tensai Bakabon, was released. Several adaptations of Charlie Chaplin routines can be found in the manga.

Osomatsu-kun has appeared in numerous special issues of Shōnen Sunday. In 1964, Akatsuka won the 10th Shogakukan Manga Award for Osomatsu-kun.

== Characters ==
=== The Matsuno sextuplets ===
The trouble-making sextuplets of the series, they are 10 years old and in the 5th grade, and were born on May 24. The six of them get along well, particularly Osomatsu and Choromatsu, but there are many occasions where Osomatsu and Choromatsu (or just Osomatsu) will get in a fight with the rest. In the 1988 anime and halfway through the original manga, their spotlight is stolen by Iyami and Chibita due to the latter two becoming more popular characters among fans of the series, leaving the sextuplets to be demoted to supporting characters.
Osomatsu Matsuno (松野 おそ松, Matsuno Osomatsu)
Voiced by: Midori Katō (1966), You Inoue (1988)
The oldest and leader of the sextuplets, as well as the best fighter in the group. In the 1993 one-shot story "Osomatsu-kun Grows Up", he has become a typical salaryman and is unmarried. His name comes from osomatsu (お粗末, lame or ill-prepared).
Karamatsu Matsuno (松野 カラ松, Matsuno Karamatsu)
Voiced by: Fuyumi Shiraishi (1966), Mari Mashiba (1988)
The second-oldest, he is neat, tidy and painful yet fickle. In "Osomatsu-kun Grows Up", he has married a green grocer's daughter. His name comes from karamatsu (唐松, larch).
Choromatsu Matsuno (松野 チョロ松, Matsuno Choromatsu)
Voiced by: Keiko Yamamoto (1966), Rica Matsumoto (1988)
The third-oldest, he is the clever one of the group but also very selfish. He and Osomatsu usually cause mischief together. In "Osomatsu-kun Grows Up", he has become a police officer. His name comes from choroi (ちょろい, easy or simple).
Ichimatsu Matsuno (松野 一松, Matsuno Ichimatsu)
Voiced by: Haruko Kitahama (1966), Mari Yokoo (1988)
He is referred to as "Ichi" (one) but is the fourth son. He is very honest and very strong. In "Osomatsu-kun Grows Up", he has become a company president after marrying his predecessor's daughter. His name comes from ichimatsumoyō (市松模様, check pattern).
Jyushimatsu Matsuno (松野 十四松, Matsuno Jūshimatsu)
Voiced by: Mie Azuma (1966), Naoko Matsui (1988)
The fifth son, he is very kind, but that is also his biggest weakness. In "Osomatsu-kun Grows Up", he has become a doctor. His name comes from jūshimatsu (十姉妹, society finch).
Todomatsu Matsuno (松野 トド松, Matsuno Todomatsu)
Voiced by: Haruko Kitahama (1966), Megumi Hayashibara (1988)
The sixth and youngest son, he is very carefree and dislikes baths. His catchphrase is "todo no tsumari" (とどのつまり, to summarise). In "Osomatsu-kun Grows Up", he runs a fish market. His name comes from todomatsu (椴松, a name for the conifer Abies sachalinensis).

=== Supporting characters ===
Iyami (イヤミ)
Voiced by: Kyōji Kobayashi (1966), Kaneta Kimotsuki (1988)
Iyami is a flashy and mischievous man who is a Francophile and claims to having been touring in France. His most notable features are his 3 large buckteeth, his thin moustache, and his Renaissance-styled haircut. He refers to himself in the first person as Mii (ミー) and other people as Chimi (チミ) and usually ends his sentences with ~zansu (〜ザンス). His trademark pose of flexing his arms and legs and shouting Sheeeh! (シェー) became a popular trend all over Japan. He was modeled after Japanese vaudevillian Tony Tani. He is usually single and is unpopular with women. His occupation and role in the series often changes. In his first appearance he was a doctor. He has also been a teacher at Osomatsu's school, a co-worker of Matsuzō's, and even a police detective pursuing Chibita, but he is almost always actually a con artist or beggar. It is often hinted that he hasn't actually been in France. Such hints include trying to eat the shells of escargot and being corrected about French facts by students who have been to France. Iyami has become the character most associated with the series, even more so than the sextuplets (much like Papa in Akatsuka's other hit series, Tensai Bakabon). The opening to the 1988 anime series focused more on him than the sextuplets, and the ending credits featured the sextuplets and Dayōn performing his "Sheeeh" pose. In "Osomatsu-kun Grows Up", Iyami works as a bartender at the bar Osomatsu usually goes to, having gone to America to learn the trade. His name comes from gaudy or disagreeable (嫌味, iyami).
Chibita (チビ太)
Voiced by: Kazue Tagami, Yōko Mizugaki, Kazuko Sawada (1966), Mayumi Tanaka (1988)
The rival of the sextuplets, he is a little younger than the sextuplets and is very short. His most notable features are his big round eyes and the one strand of hair atop his bald head. His favorite food is oden. He is a very cheeky character who likes to laugh at people with his trademark laugh Kekeh (ケケッ). He loves to bully and humiliate the sextuplets (although they bully him back) and is terribly stubborn. However, he also has a childlike side to him and loves animals and flowers. His parents are never seen or mentioned and he lives with several cats and frogs. There are many times when he appears as Iyami's assistant or subordinate, but he will also often be against Iyami. In his first appearance he was a very obedient child with strict parents, but soon became a bratty character. In the 1988 anime, he is portrayed as an edokko. Like Iyami, Chibita eventually stole the spotlight from the sextuplets and has become one of Akatsuka's most widely recognized characters. In "Osomatsu-kun Grows Up", he has become a clerk, 150 cm (59 in) tall with a full head of hair.
Totoko (トト子)
Voiced by: Fuyumi Shiraishi, Junko Hori (1966), Naoko Matsui (1988)
The heroine of the series, she is a young girl and the love interest for the sextuplets and Chibita.
Matsuzō Matsuno (松野 松造, Matsuno Matsuzō)
Voiced by: Jōji Yanami, Taimei Suzuki (1966), Tetsuo Mizutori, Kenichi Ogata (1988)
Father of the sextuplets, usually referred to as Tou-san (とうさん, father).
Matsuyo Matsuno (松野 松代, Matsuno Matsuyo)
Voiced by: Mitsuko Asō, Takako Kondō (1966), Mari Yokoo (1988)
Mother of the sextuplets, usually referred to as Kaa-san (かあさん, mother).
Hatabō (ハタ坊; lit. "Flag boy")
Voiced by: Takako Sasuga (1966), Mari Mashiba (1988)
A young boy with an umbrella-shaped hairstyle and a tiny Hinomaru flag on his head. The flag has actually pierced his skin and become stuck in his skull. Despite this, he is a rather normal child. He tends to end his sentences with ~dajō (〜だジョー). His family includes his parents and older sister, all of whom have the same hairstyle and a flag on their head. His behavior and escapades are modeled after Buster Keaton. Although stories rarely focus on him he often plays a major supporting role, usually as Chibita's minion, Dekapan or Dayon's assistant, or one of Iyami's victims. In "Osomatsu-kun Grows Up", he has become a popular comedian.
Dekapan (デカパン)
Voiced by: Takuzō Kamiyama, Setsuo Wakui (1966), Tōru Ōhira (1988)
A heavy-set man who only ever wears a large pair of striped underpants, in which he hides various things. He is going bald and has a Chaplin-like moustache. He is very soft-natured and also loves animals. He keeps several dogs and cats as pets, all of whom he refers to as Bouya (坊や; boy or kid). He speaks with an imitation Tōhoku-dialect, ends his sentences with "~dasu" (〜だス), and often says "Hoe-hoe" (ホエホエ). Unlike Iyami or Chibita, he is never the main focus of a story, most likely because his good nature clashes with the more-mischievous cast. He tends to play wealthy men, company presidents, scientists, or doctors. He is also often portrayed as a paternal figure for the sextuplets, Totoko, and Hatabō. In "Osomatsu-kun Grows Up", he is pretty much the same character. His name is short for "Dekai Pantsu" (でかいパンツ, lit. Huge Pants).
Dayōn (ダヨーン)
Voiced by: Takuzō Kamiyama, Hiroshi Ōtake (1966), Takuzō Kamiyama (1988)
A gluttonous man with neatly parted hair, drooping eyes, a little bit of stubble, and an unusually large mouth. Despite his gluttony he is not fat, and he usually wears a suit and geta sandals. He tends to pop-up out of nowhere and likes to play dumb. Like Dekapan, he never plays a main role, but he often plays a supporting role, such as a sheriff. He ends his sentences with "~dayōn" (〜だよーん). In "Osomatsu-kun Grows Up", he appears as one of Hatabō's fans.
Nyarome, Beshi, and Kemunpasu
Voiced by: Shigeru Chiba, Tetsuo Mizutori, and Takuzō Kamiyama
Originally from Mōretsu Atarō, they only appear in the 1988 anime.
Omawari-san, Rerere no Oji-san, and Yoru no Inu
Voiced by: Shigeru Chiba
Originally from Tensai Bakabon, they only appear in the 1988 anime.

== Media ==
=== Manga ===
The original manga by Fujio Akatsuka ran in Shogakukan's Weekly Shōnen Sunday between 1962 and 1969. Early chapters of the manga were based around people becoming mixed-up with the sextuplets identities, due to how they all looked alike. However, as the manga progressed, more chapters focused on the misadventures of Iyami and Chibita to the point that they eventually took over as the main characters. An English-Japanese bilingual volume has been released on August 10, 2017, in Japan.

=== Anime ===
==== 1966 series ====
The original anime series was produced by Studio Zero and co-produced by Children's Corner; it was in black-and-white and aired in Japan between February 1966 and March 1967. The first opening was "Osomatsu-kun no Uta" (おそ松くんのうた, Song of Osomatsu-kun) by Matsuyo, the sextuplets, Iyami, and Chibita, while the second opening was "Osomatsu-kun no Uta 2" (おそ松くんのうた2, Song of Osomatsu-kun 2) by Makoto Fujita, with instrumental versions used as ending themes. Akatsuka himself supervised the series. Unlike the 1988 anime series, the sextuplets had more screen time in the episodes with prominent appearances of Iyami and Chibita. Often the same character animation was reused six times in a single shot for the sextuplets due to how they all looked alike. The series reran in the 1970s, but it went missing sometime after the reruns ended. In 1990, 16mm broadcast prints of the entire series were found in a TV station warehouse. The entire series was later released on DVD box sets, along with individual volumes.

==== 1988 series ====
The second series, which was produced by Studio Pierrot, aired in Japan between February 1988 and December 1989. The series is notably different from the original series, focusing largely on Iyami and Chibita as the main protagonists, but was still very popular, hitting ratings as high as 20%. The opening theme was "Seichō Osomatsu Setsu" (正調 おそ松節, Traditional Osomatsu Tune) while the ending theme was "Osomatsu-kun Ondō" (おそ松くん音頭), both performed by Takashi Hosokawa. A short film, Osomatsu-kun: Suika no Hoshi Kara Konnichiwa zansu! (おそ松くん スイカの星からこんにちはザンス!, Osomatsu-kun: Greetings From the Planet Watermelon!), was released on March 18, 1989.

=== Drama ===
On December 16, 1985, a live-action TV special entitled Osomatsu-kun, Iyami, Chibita no Itamae Ippon Shōbu (おそ松くん イヤミ・チビ太の板前一本勝負, Osomatsu-kun, Iyami, and Chibita's Cooking Showdown) was aired as part of Fuji Television's Monday Dramaland. The series revolves around Iyami and Chibita competing to be the best chef at the Matsuno's restaurant in order to appeal to a food critique. The theme song was performed by Tatsuro Yamashita.

==== Cast ====
- Osomatsu: Yōsuke Nakajima
- Iyami: George Tokoro
- Chibita: Chiaki Watanabe
- Matsuzō: Chū Arai
- Totoko: Kyōko Takami
- Dayōn: Naoto Takenaka
- Dekapan: Junji Inagawa
- Honkan-san: Masashi Tashiro
- Totoko: Yumiko Morishita
- Guest appearance by Fujio Akatsuka

=== Video games ===
Three video games based on the series have been produced. Osomatsu-kun: Hachamecha Gekijō (おそ松くん はちゃめちゃ劇場, Osomatsu-kun: Crazy Theater) was developed and published by Sega for the Mega Drive on December 24, 1988. It was the first game developed for the system that wasn't released outside Japan. Osomatsu-kun: Back to the Me no Deppa Maki (おそ松くん バック・トゥ・ザ・ミーの出っ歯の巻, Osomatsu-kun: Back to the Me's Overbite Winding) was released by Bandai for the Family Computer on December 8, 1989. Finally, Hisattsu Pachinko Station V9 Osomatsu-kun (必殺パチンコステーションV9 おそ松くん, Finishing Move Pachinko Station V9 Osomatsu-kun) was released by Sunsoft for the PlayStation 2 on February 24, 2005.

== Mr. Osomatsu ==
Mr. Osomatsu, produced by Pierrot, aired in Japan between October 2015 and March 2016 and was simulcast by Crunchyroll, making it the first piece of Osomatsu-kun media to receive an official English release. The series, which celebrates the 80th birthday of creator Fujio Akatsuka, who died at the age of 72 in 2008, follows the Matsuno siblings as adults. The series' first episode, which featured multiple parodies, was removed from streaming sites on November 12, 2015, and was replaced by an original video animation in its home video release. Additionally, the third episode, which features a crude parody of Anpanman, was edited for its BS Japan broadcast and is altered in its home video release. A second season aired from October 2017 to March 2018.

A manga adaptation of Osomatsu-san, illustrated by Masako Shitara, began serialization in Shueisha's You magazine from January 15, 2016. An otome game based on the series is being developed by Idea Factory.

== Reception ==
Naoki Urasawa stated that in mid-1960s Japan, the character Iyami from Osomatsu-kun was so popular that whenever children took a picture, they were sure to copy his iconic "Sheeh" pose. He noted that Godzilla struck the pose in 1965 kaiju film Invasion of Astro-Monster, as did John Lennon and Paul McCartney when they visited Japan. Iyami appears in Urasawa's 2017 manga Mujirushi: The Sign of Dreams, where he is known only as the Director.
