= Fujio Akatsuka =

Japanese manga artist

- 赤塚 不二夫
- Born: 赤塚 藤雄 (Fujio Akatsuka); September 14, 1935; Rehe, Manchukuo (now Chengde, Hebei, China)
- Died: August 2, 2008 (aged 72); Bunkyo, Tokyo, Japan
- Occupation: Manga artist
- Known for: Tensai Bakabon; Osomatsu-kun; Himitsu no Akko-chan
- Website: www.koredeiinoda.net

Fujio Akatsuka (赤塚 藤雄, also known as 赤塚 不二夫, Akatsuka Fujio; September 14, 1935 – August 2, 2008) was a Japanese manga artist. Known as the "King of Gag Manga" (ギャグ漫画の王様 (Gag Manga no Ousama), he created many popular manga such as Osomatsu-kun, Himitsu no Akko-chan, and Tensai Bakabon.

== Biography ==
He was born in Rehe, Manchuria, the son of a Japanese military police officer. After World War II, he grew up in Niigata Prefecture and Nara Prefecture. When he was 19, he moved to Tokyo.

While working at a chemical factory, he drew many manga. After that, Tokiwa-so accepted him. He started his career as a shōjo artist, but in 1958, his Nama-chan (ナマちゃん) became a hit, so he became a specialist in comic manga. He won the Shogakukan Manga Award in 1964 for Osomatsu-kun and the Bungeishunjū Manga Award in 1971 for Tensai Bakabon. He is said to have been influenced by Buster Keaton and MAD magazine.

In 1965, Akatsuka established his own company "Fujio Productions Ltd.".

In 2000, he drew manga in braille for the blind.

Many of his manga featured supporting characters who ended up becoming more popular and more associated with their series than the main character, such as Papa (Tensai Bakabon), Iyami, Chibita (Osomatsu-kun), and Nyarome (Mōretsu Atarō).

In April 2002 he was hospitalized for intra-axial hematoma and was said to frequently be in a persistent vegetative state from 2004 until his death. In July 2006, his second wife Machiko, who had been nursing him, suddenly died from a subarachnoid hemorrhage. On August 2, 2008, he died of pneumonia at a hospital in Bunkyō, Tokyo.

== Works ==
Among Akatsuka's extensive body of work, his series of Osomatsu-kun, Himitsu no Akko-chan, Tensai Bakabon, and Mōretsu Atarō are often considered his top four major series by Fujio Pro, due to their success in garnering animated adaptations and their lengthy runs and revivals.

=== Serial Works ===
(In order of publication)

1950s

- Angel in the Dark (くらやみの天使) (October 1958-March 1959, Shojo Club)- Assisted Shotaro Ishinomori and Hideko Mizuno, published under the shared pseudonym U.MIA
- Matsuge-chan (まつげちゃん) (October 1958-April 1961, Hitomi)
  - July–December 1961, Ribon
- Nama-chan (ナマちゃん) (December 1958-March 1961, Manga King)

1960s

- Ohana-chan (おハナちゃん) (January 1960-March 1962, Shojo Club)
- Happy-chan (ハッピィちゃん) (March 1960-June 1961, Ribon)
- Tunnel Team (トンネルチーム) (April to September 1960, Fun 4th Grader)
- Okazu-chan (おカズちゃん) (April 1960-March 1961, Fun 5th Grader)
- Kantarō (カン太郎) (May–September 1961, Adventure King)
  - January 1964-April 1965, Shonen Book
- Osomatsu-kun (おそ松くん) (April 15, 1962- May 18, 1969, Weekly Shonen Sunday)- Serialization changed to monthly from August 13, 1967, to allow for less frequent but longer chapters
  - April 1964-March 1969, Separate Edition Shonen Sunday
  - April to December 1966, Boys' Life
  - April to October 1966, Elementary School 4th Grade
  - April to December 1966, Elementary School 2nd Grade
  - April 1966-March 1967, Kindergarten
  - May 1966-March 1967, Elementary School 1st Grade
  - July 1966-March 1967, Monthly Shogakukan Book
  - March 19, 1972 – December 24, 1973, Weekly Shonen King
  - November 1987-March 1990, Comic BomBom
  - February 1988-January 1990, TV Magazine
- O-chan's Eleven Friends (オーちゃんと11人のなかま) (April 1962-March 1963, Fun 5th Grader)
- Jinx-kun (ジンクスくん) (April 1962-March 1963, Junior High 1st Year Course)
- Himitsu no Akko-chan (ひみつのアッコちゃん) (June 1962-September 1965, Ribon)
  - November 1968-December 1969, Ribon
  - October 1988-September 1989, Nakayoshi
- Otasuke-kun (おた助くん) (April 1963-March 1964, Elementary School 4th Grade)
- Circus Jinta (サーカスジン太) (August–December 1963, Adventure King)
- You're a Shinobi, Sasuke-kun (しのびの者だよ サースケくん) (August–September 1963, Bokura)
- Makasete Chōta (まかせて長太) (October 1963-September 1965, Shonen)
- Mechakucha NO. 1 (メチャクチャNO.1) (January 1964-December 1965, Adventure King)
  - January–September 1967, Adventure King
- Songo-kun (そんごくん) (April 1964-March 1965, Elementary School 4th Grade)
- Opposite Address 3 (あべこべ3番地) (1964, Margaret)
- Jajako-chan (ジャジャ子ちゃん) (June 22, 1965- July 5, 1966, Shojo Friend)
- You Love Me-kun (ユーラブミーくん) (July 1965-August 1966, Heibon)
- Giant Mama (ジャイアントママ) (August 1-August 29, 1965, Weekly Shonen Magazine)
- Kibimama-chan (キビママちゃん) (October 1965-August 1966, Ribon)
- Thriller Professor (スリラー教授) (January–March 1966, Boys' Life)
- Phantom Thief 1/2 Face (怪盗1/2面相) (April–September 1966, Shonen Book)
- Fujio Akatsuka's Ganbarima Show (赤塚不二夫のガンバリまショー) (January–May 1967, Shonen Book)
- Good Morning with Mi-tan (ミータンとおはよう) (January–July 1967, Ribon)
- Chibita-kun (チビ太くん) (June 1967-January 1969, Shonen Book)
- Kikanpo Gen-chan (きかんぽげんちゃん) (January–September 1967, Elementary School 2nd Grade)
- Tensai Bakabon (天才バカボン) (April 9, 1967 – February 23, 1969, Weekly Shonen Magazine)
  - August 1967-January 1969, Separate Edition Shonen Magazine
  - August 24, 1969 – April 5, 1970, Weekly Shonen Sunday
  - September 9, 1969-June 1970, Deluxe Shonen Sunday
  - May 10, 1971 – June 1, 1971, Weekly Bokura Magazine
  - June 27, 1971 – December 7, 1976, Weekly Shonen Magazine
  - August 1974-May 1975, Separate Edition Shonen Magazine
  - June 1976-December 1978, Monthly Shonen Magazine
  - October 1987-October 1991, Comic BomBom
  - November 1987-January 1991, TV Magazine
  - January 1988-February 1989, Monthly Shonen Magazine
  - October 1989-January 1991, Monthly Hero Magazine
  - November 1991-December 1992, Deluxe BomBom
- Hennako-chan (へんな子ちゃん) (September 1967-August 1969, Ribon)
- Tamanegi Tama-chan (たまねぎたまちゃん) (September 1967-December 1969, Elementary School 1st Grade)
- Hippie-chan (ヒッピーちゃん) (1967-1968, Shojo Friend)
- Mōretsu Atarō (もーれつア太郎) (November 28, 1967 – June 28, 1970, Weekly Shonen Sunday)
  - April 1969-October 1971, Kindergarten
  - October 1969-March 1971, Elementary School 4th Grade
  - January 1970-June 1971, Elementary School 3rd Grade
  - January 1970-November 1971, Elementary School 2nd Grade
  - April 1990-January 1991, Comic BomBom
  - May 1990-January 1991, TV Magazine
- Dekunobo of the Wilderness (荒野のデクの棒) (1968, Weekly Shonen King)
- We are 8 Pro (われら8プロ) (1968, Weekly Shonen King)
- The Flower of Dekoppachi (花のデコッ八) (May–September 1969, Deluxe Shonen Sunday)
- Tensai Bakabon's Old Man (天才バカボンのおやじ)
- Zuruchō Has Come (やってきたズル長) (1969, Shonen Jump)
- Oh! Geba Geba (Oh！ゲバゲバ) (1969, Weekly Shonen Jump)

1970s

- I am the Violent Tetsu (おれはゲバ鉄) (1970, Weekly Shonen Jump)
- Karappe of the Wind (風のカラッペ) (1970-1971, Weekly Shonen King)
- Bukkare* Dan (ぶっかれ*ダン) (August 2, 1970 – March 14, 1971, Weekly Shonen Sunday)
- Shinigami Dēsu (死神デース) (1970-1971, Bokura)
- 48 Chibi (48チビ) (1970-1971, Shonen Picture Report)
- Mad Dog Trotsky (狂犬トロッキー) (January–September 1971, Separate Edition Shonen Magazine)
- Hatabō (ハタ坊) (January–December 1971, Red Flag Sunday)
- I'm Kemugoro (ぼくはケムゴロ) (April 1971-March 1972, 4th Grade)
- Let's La Gon (レッツラゴン) (September 5, 1971 – July 14, 1974, Weekly Shonen Sunday)
- Wanpei (ワンペイ) (January 9-December 24, 1972, Red Flag Sunday)
- Kurikurikuri-chan (くりくりくりちゃん) (November 1971-August 1972, Kindergatden)
- Croquette-kun (クロッケくん) (April 1972-March 1973, Shogakukan's Elementary School 4th Grade)
- The Great Stupid Detective Kogoro Wakuchi (はくち小五郎)) (June 1972-December 1974, Adventure King)
- Gag Guerrilla (ギャグゲリラ) (October 1972-December 1982, Weekly Bunshun)
- Kusobaba (クソばばあ) (November 1972-April 1973, Manga NO.1)
- King of Gags (ギャグの王様) (1974, Weekly Shonen King #5-38)
- We Are No-Good High (おいらダメ高) (April–June 1974, High School 2nd Year Course)
- Shōnen Friday (少年フライデー) (1974-1975, Weekly Shonen Sunday)
- Occhan (オッチャン) (1974-1976, Weekly Shonen King)
- Waruwaru World (ワルワルワールド) (1974-1975, Weekly Shonen Champion)
- Tsumannaiko-chan (つまんない子ちゃん) (January 1975-April 1976, Princess)
- Nyan Nyan Nyanda (ニャンニャンニャンダ) (January 1975-October 1976, Adventure King)
- BC Adam (BCアダム) (1975, Weekly Shonen Magazine)
- Noragaki (のらガキ) (1975-1976, Weekly Shonen Sunday)
- Rakugaki (ラクガキ) (March 9-December 7, 1975, Yomiuri Shimbun Sunday)
- Naughty Angel (わんぱく天使（エンゼル）) (May 1976-May 1977, Princess)
- Mom NO. 1 (母ちゃんNO.1) (1976-1977, Weekly Shonen Sunday)
- Kong Oyaji (コングおやじ) (1976-1977, Weekly Shonen King)
- Tuttle-kun (タトルくん) (1977, Manga-kun)
- Architect Kensaku (建師ケン作) (1977, Weekly Shonen Magazine)
- Monster Ball Man (怪球マン) (April 1977-May 1978, Dokkan V)
- Gags with Fujio (不二夫のギャグありき) (1977, Weekly Shonen Sunday)
- Animal Wars (アニマル大戦) (1978, Weekly Shonen King)
- Mame-tan (まめーたん) (April 1979-March 1982, Elementary School 1st Grade)
- Gontarō Niguruma (荷車権太郎) (July 27-August 17, 1978, Weekly Manga Action)
- Chibimama (ちびママ) (August 1978-January 1979, Dokkan V)
- Mr. Dada (ダダ氏) (September 1, 1978 – September 1, 1979, New Art Newspaper)
- The Mean Old Man (いじわる爺さん) (November 30, 1978 – March 23, 1979, Weekly Manga Action)
- Monster at Address #13 (モンスター13番地) (February–December 1979, Shonen Challenge)
- Ojisan is a Persuman (おじさんはパースーマン) (April 1979-March 1981, Elementary School 5th Grade)

1980s

- Romeo and Julie (ロメオとジュリー) (January–June 1980, Shonen Challenge)
- Chibidon (チビドン) (February 1980-March 1981, Monthly CoroCoro Comic)
- Caster (キャスター) (April 1980-February 1981, Popcorn)- Magazine was published bimonthly until its closure in February 1981
- Babatchi-sensei (ババチ先生) (April 6, 1980 – March 15, 1981, Shonen and Shojo Newspaper)
- What is this Mama? (なんじゃらママ) (September–November 1980, Shonen Challenge)
- The Virgin☆Toraemon (乙女座☆虎右) (1981, Weekly Shonen Jump)
- The Flower of Kikuchiyo (花の菊千代) (April 1981- March 1982, Monthly CoroCoro Comic)
- Waru-chan (ワルちゃん) ( April 1981-March 1983, 5th Grade)
- Piyo the 13th (ピヨ13世) (May–December 1981, Just Comic)
- Comedy is Coming Now (お笑いはこれからだ) (April 1982-December 1984, Novel Shincho)
- Basho Matsuo (松尾馬蕉) (April 4-October 3, 1983, Heibon Punch)
- Japan Laughter Story (にっぽん笑来ばなし) (November 1983-November 1985, 2001 magazine)
- Weekly Special Boy (週刊スペシャル小僧) (1983-1984, Weekly Shonen Champion)
- Tokio and Kakeru (TOKIOとカケル) (1985, Weekly Shonen Champion)
- What Will Fujio Akatsuka Do?! (赤塚不二夫のどうしてくれる!?) (February 17-December 29, 1985, Sunday Daily)
- Studying the Great Master (大先生を読む) (1986-1989, Big Comic Original)
- Yarasete Ojisan (ヤラセテおじさん) (May 6-December 29, 1987, Weekly Masses)
- Omusubi-kun (おむすびくん) (October 1987, June 1988, August 1988)

1990s

- Big in Japan, Putaro's Family (大日本プータロー一家) (October 1990-August 1991, Comic BomBom)
- MR. Masashi (MR.マサシ) (September 1991-June 1992, Comic BomBom)
- The Cat Houseowner (ネコの大家さん) (March 1993-March 1994, Deluxe BomBom)
- Fujio Akatsuka's Animal Land (赤塚不二夫のアニマルランド) (January–April 1995, Manga Da No 1)
- Liquor Hermit Dayoon (酒仙人ダヨーン) (January–February 1999, Big Comic)

=== Short stories ===
- Beyond the Storm (嵐を超えて) (June 7, 1956, Akebono Publishing)- Mainstream debut work, written directly for a tankobon release
- A Flash of Light on the Lake ((湖上の閃光) (August 25, 1956, Akebono Publishing)
- Storm Wharf (嵐の波止場) (December 10, 1956, Akebono Publishing)
- Dayōn-ojisan (ダ・ヨーンのおじさん) (January 1966, Shonen Book)
- Kyuhei and Big Sister (九平とねえちゃん) (1966, Ribbon)
- Oo Abare Apache-kun (大あばれアパッチ君) (August 1st, 1968, Weekly Shonen Jump)
- Mr. Iyami (ミスターイヤミ) (July 10, 1970, Big Comic)
- Inspector Oni (鬼警部) (December 1970, Separate Edition Shonen Sunday)
- Spartako (スパルタッコ) (1971, Weekly Shonen Sunday)
- Gang Girl Keroko (スケバンケロ子) (January 1, 1973, Manga No. 1)
- Unkor Wat (ウンコールワット) (1974, Weekly Shonen Jump)
- Bakumatsu Rare Dog Group (幕末珍犬組) (April 8-April 15, 1973, Weekly Shonen Magazine)
- Middle-Aged Friday (ウジャバランド) (1975, Weekly Shonen Sunday)
- Ujabaland (ウジャバランド) (1976, Weekly Shonen Jump)
- Hanahada-kun (ハナハダくん) (December 1978, 5th Grade)
- Run Away Run Away (逃げろや逃げろ) (August 1979, Shonen Challenge)
- The Collapse of the Sheeh! Religion (シェー教の崩壊) (January 1996, Big Gold)

=== Adaptations ===
These series or one-shots are derivative works, created as adaptations of TV shows or novels by other authors.

- Marippe-sensei (まりっぺ先生) (April to November 1959, Ribon)- Based on TV series by Kazuo Funahashi
- Sunset Angel (夕やけ天使) (November 1961-April 1962, Ribon)- Based on the TV series by Aoi Takagaki
- The Blue-Eyed Delinquent (青い目のバンチョウ) (Weekly Shonen Sunday: #17 for 1973)- Based on the original story by Hisashi Yamanaka
- House Jack Nana-chan (ハウスジャックナナちゃん) (Weekly Shonen Magazine: #50 to #52 for 1977)- Based on Eight Family Scenes by Yasutaka Tsutsui
- Wonderful Fool (おバカさん) (1978, Weekly Shonen Magazine)- Based on the original story by Shusaku Endo

== Assistants ==
- Kunio Nagatani
- Mitsutoshi Furuya
- Kenichiro Takai
- Takao Yokoyama
- Ken'ichi Kitami
- Kazuyoshi Torii
- Yoshiko Tsuchida
- Tsutomu Adachi
- Don Sasaki
- Shohei Kizaki
- Keiji Terashi
- Kawaguti Masashi
- Koji Oikawa
- Kiri Mitsunori
- Kondo Yosuke
- Shiiya Mitsunori
- Yumi Nakano
- Yuki Hiroyo
- Akira Saito
- Jinichi Tokisato

== See also ==
- Akatsuka Award
