= List of Dr. Slump Arale-chan episodes =

The Dr. Slump - Arale-chan anime series is based on the manga Dr. Slump by Akira Toriyama. It follows the life of inventor Senbei Norimaki and his family and friends, most notably the humanoid robot Arale Norimaki. This article lists all 243 episodes, seven specials and three educational films. For the 74-episode series that began in 1997, see List of Dr. Slump episodes.

The first 18 episodes (with the exceptions of episodes 7–10, 13, 14, and 17) as well as episodes 23 and 41 contain two 11-minute stories. The rest are just one full 22-minute story.

== Series overview ==
Season	Episodes	Originally released	
Season	Episodes	First released	Last released
1	50	April 8, 1981	April 7, 1982
2	52	April 14, 1982	April 6, 1983
3	48	April 13, 1983	March 21, 1984
4	47	March 28, 1984	March 20, 1985
5	46	March 27, 1985	February 19, 1986

== Episode list ==
=== Season 1 (1981-82) ===
No. overall	No. in season	Title	Directed by	Written by	Animation directed by	Art directed by	Original release date	Prod. code
1	1	"Arale's Birth!"; Transliteration: "Arare tanjō!" (Japanese: アラレ誕生!)	Minoru Okazaki	Masaki Tsuji	Rie Nishiyama	Mataji Urata	April 8, 1981	101
1	1	"Hey! Friends"; Transliteration: "O-ssu! Otomodachi" (Japanese: オーッス!お友だち)	Minoru Okazaki	Masaki Tsuji	Rie Nishiyama	Teiichi Akashi	April 8, 1981	101
"Arale's Birth!": Senbei Norimaki, Penguin Village's goofy scientist, finally finishes creating the perfect humanoid android. Her only flaw is that she is nearsighted and needs to wear glasses. Senbei takes her into town to convince everybody she is a normal 13-year-old girl. "Hey! Friends": Arale starts her first day at Penguin Village Junior High School. While introducing Arale to the principal Senbei meets Ms. Yamabuki, Arale's new teacher who Senbei falls in love with. While Arale is at school she meets her new friends Akane Kimidori, Peasuke Soramame and Taro Soramame.
2	2	"Arale Goes to School!"; Transliteration: "Arare-chan gakkō e" (Japanese: アラレちゃん学校へ)	Toyoo Ashida	Masaki Tsuji	Toyoo Ashida	Toshikazu Yamaguchi	April 15, 1981	102
2	2	"It is! ...not there" Transliteration: "Are! ...ga nai" (Japanese: アレッ!…がない)	Toyoo Ashida	Masaki Tsuji	Toyoo Ashida	Toshikazu Yamaguchi	April 15, 1981	102
"Arale Goes to School!": Everybody in Penguin Village Junior High is asking Arale to join their clubs but Arale seems too good for all of them. "It is! ...not there": Arale comes home from school and tells Senbei that the girls at school said that she is missing a part of the body that the other girls had. Senbei makes a pair of glasses that see through peoples clothes so he can see girls naked and "find out what she is missing". In the end it actually was a belly button that she was missing.
3	3	"Great Adventure with the Time Slipper"; Transliteration: "Taimu surippā de daibōken" (Japanese: タイムスリッパーで大冒険)	Akinori Nagaoka	Shun'ichi Yukimuro	Toshiki Hirano	Teiichi Akashi	April 22, 1981	103
3	3	"What's with the Egg?!"; Transliteration: "Nan no tamago?" (Japanese: なんのタマゴ?!)	Akinori Nagaoka	Shun'ichi Yukimuro	Toshiki Hirano	Teiichi Akashi	April 22, 1981	103
"Great Adventure with the Time Slipper": Senbei shows Arale his newest invention, The Time Slipper a board with a talking clock that can travel time. Arale accidentally gets lost in ancient Japan with the Time Slipper. "What's with the Egg?!": Senbei gathers Arale and Peasuke to come along to a trip on the Time Slipper to the prehistoric ages to catch a dinosaur. While failing to get a dinosaur they meet Peasuke's prehistoric ancestor who gives them a rare egg in exchange for Senbei's lighter. When they return to the present the egg hatches and a strange angel like baby creature comes from the egg.
4	4	"Huh?! Is it a Boy? Is it a Girl?"; Transliteration: "Oya?! Otoko no ko? Onna no ko?" (Japanese: おや?!男の子?女の子?)	Masayuki Ôzeki	Shun'ichi Yukimuro	Sadayoshi Tominaga	Toshikazu Yamaguchi	May 6, 1981	104
4	4	"Gatchan the Courier"; Transliteration: "Otsukai Gatchan" (Japanese: お使いガッちゃん)	Masayuki Ôzeki	Shun'ichi Yukimuro	Mitsuo Shindō	Toshikazu Yamaguchi	May 6, 1981	104
"Huh?! Is it a Boy? Is it a Girl?": After the strange baby hatched from the egg, Arale and Senbei try to raise it. They find out that it eats metal and is powerful after it survives a long fall after Arale accidentally threw it too high. Later at night in the bath, Arale and Senbei discover that it has wings. They decide to name it Gadzilla but "Gatchan" for short and then keep it as a member of the family. "Gatchan the Courier": Gatchan wakes up early in the morning and decides to pull pranks on the residence of Penguin Village.
5	5	"My Friend, Mr. Bear!!"; Transliteration: "Kuma-san tomodachi!!" (Japanese: クマさん友だち!!)	Directed by : Hiroyuki Ikeda; Storyboarded by : Katsumi Endō	Tomoko Konparu	Toyoo Ashida	Teiichi Akashi	May 13, 1981	105
5	5	"New Invention! The Big-Small Ray Gun"; Transliteration: "Shinhatsumei! Deka-chibi kōsenjū" (Japanese: 新発明!デカチビ光線銃)	Directed by : Yūji Katō; Storyboarded by : Katsumi Endō	Tomoko Konparu	Toyoo Ashida	Teiichi Akashi	May 13, 1981	105
"My Friend, Mr. Bear!!": Arale rescues a bear from a cage and helps it to go back to the forest where it belongs in. "New Invention! The Big-Small Ray Gun": Arale plays with one of Senbei's inventions called the Big-Small Ray Gun.
6	6	"The Teacher is Coming!"; Transliteration: "Sensei ga kuru yo!" (Japanese: 先生がくるよ!)	Toyoo Ashida	Ayuko Anzai	Toyoo Ashida	Toshikazu Yamaguchi	May 20, 1981	106
6	6	"Arale is Kidnapped!"; Transliteration: "Arare yūkaisareru!" (Japanese: アラレ誘かいされる!)	Toyoo Ashida	Ayuko Anzai	Toyoo Ashida	Toshikazu Yamaguchi	May 20, 1981	106
"The Teacher is Coming!": Arale has told Senbei that a teacher is coming to their house. Once he hears this, he thinks Ms. Yamabuki is coming, so he has invented a barber machine to groom his hair to look nice. However, this barber machine is a failed robot. "Arale is Kidnapped!": Arale and Gatchan meet a bank robber named Joe Dunn while playing outside. Joe tries to use them as hostages, but instead becomes frightened at them because Arale didn't get hurt when accidentally shooting herself with his gun and Gatchan nibbled a part of his gun when he tried to it as hostage.
7	7	"Arale-Chan Charge"; Transliteration: "Totsugeki Arare-chan" (Japanese: とつげきアラレちゃん)	Akinori Nagaoka	Shun'ichi Yukimuro	Rie Nishiyama	Teiichi Akashi	May 27, 1981	107
7	7	"Arale-Chan Charge"; Transliteration: "Totsugeki Arare-chan" (Japanese: とつげきアラレちゃん)	Akinori Nagaoka	Shun'ichi Yukimuro	Toshiki Hirano	Teiichi Akashi	May 27, 1981	107
Arale's day is a normal day to her, but not for everyone else. In the morning, she destroys a police car, and at the school she eats a bunch of whisky bonbons and gets drunk. That night, she starts having a stomachache.
8	8	"The Story of Donbe"; Transliteration: "Donbe monogatari" (Japanese: ドンベ物語)	Akinori Nagaoka	Tomoko Konparu	Sadayoshi Tominaga	Toshikazu Yamaguchi	June 3, 1981	108
Donbe plays spiteful pranks on the people of Penguin Village. He runs into trouble after failing to impersonate Miss Yamabuki to get the school's fish and Senbei is mistaken for Donbe. As Donbe finds out how powerful Arale is, he gets his foot caught in a trap and reveals to Arale how badly humans treated him and his parents. Arale invites Donbe over to Senbei's to receive medical treatment despite the trouble the fox caused him.
9	9	"The Great Strawberry Panties Caper"; Transliteration: "Ichigo pantsu daisakusen" (Japanese: イチゴパンツ大作戦)	Directed by : Toyoo Ashida; Storyboarded by : Katsumi Endō	Ayuko Anzai	Toyoo Ashida	Teiichi Akashi	June 10, 1981	109
Arale blabs to Senbei about Miss Yamabuki's strawberry panties. Helped by Arale's animal friends, the professor conducts a complicated scientific process so he can get a peek at Yamabuki's panties. However his attempts fail, leaving him in a state of shock.
10	10	"Aah, Earth SOS!!"; Transliteration: "Aa chikyū SOS!!" (Japanese: あァ地球SOS!!)	Directed by : Yūji Katō; Storyboarded by : Yasuo Yamayoshi	Masaki Tsuji	Toshiki Hirano	Mataji Urata & Shōji Suyama	June 17, 1981	110
The alien king Nikochan abducts Arale and Gatchan and is intent on destroying the Earth, but Gatchan eats the alien spaceship. While Senbei builds a new spaceship, Nikochan is driven crazy by the positive reactions the inhabitants show towards aliens. The new spaceship is finished but never leaves the Earth.
11	11	"Hip Hip Children"; Transliteration: "Teketeke chirudoren" (Japanese: テケテケチルドレン)	Masayuki Ôzeki	Tomoko Konparu	Sadayoshi Tominaga	Mataji Urata	June 24, 1981	111
11	11	"Scary Scary Policewoman"; Transliteration: "Kowai kowai fukei-san" (Japanese: こわいこわい婦警さん)	Masayuki Ôzeki	Tomoko Konparu	Mitsuo Shindō	Shōji Suyama	June 24, 1981	111
"Hip Hip Children": Arale plays with a girl named Kinoko Sarada, who helps Arale fit in with modern ways, but end in disaster when Arale and Gatchen put on a lot of makeup. "Scary Scary Policewoman": Senbei is antagonised by a crazy and quick-judging policewoman. The professor finds himself chased by the townspeople when he tries out his invisibility formula, until he sustains full body injuries.
12	12	"Transform Ponpoko Gun"; Transliteration: "Henshin ponpokogan" (Japanese: 変身ポンポコガン)	Hiromitsu Morita	Shun'ichi Yukimuro	Hiromitsu Morita	Toshikazu Yamaguchi	July 1, 1981	112
12	12	"Arale Flies the Skies"; Transliteration: "Arare sora o tobu" (Japanese: アラレ空をとぶ)	Hiromitsu Morita	Shun'ichi Yukimuro	Hiromitsu Morita	Toshikazu Yamaguchi	July 1, 1981	112
"Transform Ponpoko Gun": Senbei builds a gun that transforms whatever the gunner chooses. Arale uses it to turn Yamabuki into Senbei's wife and then turn Senbei into a sea monster. "Arale Flies the Skies": Arale wants to fly like Gatchan, so Senbei builds her a flying machine. After a test flight in it, Arale lands on the Weatherman's domain and plays about with the weather.
13	13	"The Terrifying Good Girl"; Transliteration: "Kyōfu no yoikokko" (Japanese: 恐怖のよいこっコ)	Masayuki Ôzeki	Tomoko Konparu	Mitsuo Shindō	Teiichi Akashi	July 8, 1981	113
Senbei chastises Arale for her antics. Arale's old acquaintance, Joe finds himself dragged into the house, but Arale helps him steal the household inventions, to Senbei's chagrin. Still determined to prove that she is a good girl she takes Yamabuki's lesson with such enthusiasm, that she terrifies the animals of Penguin Village and puts the police through a lot of trouble.
14	14	"Our Hero Suppaman"; Transliteration: "Eiyū Suppaman" (Japanese: 英雄スッパマン)	Directed by : Yūji Katō; Storyboarded by : Katsumi Endō	Shun'ichi Yukimuro	Mitsuru Niiza	Mataji Urata & Shōji Suyama	July 15, 1981	114
Suppaman has appeared at Penguin Village. He thinks he is a super hero, but everyone knows he is a troublemaker. The only thing he can beat Arale and Gatchan in is rock, paper, scissors. However, for some reason Arale starts to admire him.
15	15	"Arale's Errand"; Transliteration: "Otsukai Arare-chan" (Japanese: おつかいアラレちゃん)	Akinori Nagaoka	Shun'ichi Yukimuro	Katsumi Aoshima	Toshikazu Yamaguchi	July 22, 1981	115
15	15	"Yay Yay Wildland"; Transliteration: "Waiwai Wairudorando" (Japanese: わいわいワイルドランド)	Akinori Nagaoka	Shun'ichi Yukimuro	Sadayoshi Tominaga	Toshikazu Yamaguchi	July 22, 1981	115
"Arale's Errand": Arale sees Akane's bra for the first time, and she starts wanting to have one too. "Yay Yay Wildland": Arale and her friends go to a safari park called Wild land. They get on a jeep to see the wild animals, but the jeep breaks in the middle of the jungle.
SP1	15.5	"Huh!? Penguin Village Through the TV Jack"; Transliteration: "Ayaya!? Pengin Mura De Terebijakku" (Japanese: あやや!? ペンギン村でテレビジャック)	Masayuki Ôzeki	Shun'ichi Yukimuro	Minoru Maeda	Toshikazu Yamaguchi	July 25, 1981	TBA
This special was broadcast within the Queen Millennia TV anime special, "Summer Anime Matsuri Special: Arale-chan's Family Appears! Who is Queen Millennia!?" It is a crossover between the Dr. Slump Arale-chan and Queen Millennia anime television series.
16	16	"Living for Tomorrow!"; Transliteration: "Asu ni mukatte!" (Japanese: あすに向って!)	Masayuki Ôzeki	Masaki Tsuji	Toshiki Hirano	Teiichi Akashi	July 29, 1981	116
16	16	"Arale is Akane!?"; Transliteration: "Arare wa Akane!?" (Japanese: アラレはあかね!?)	Masayuki Ôzeki	Masaki Tsuji	Toshiki Hirano	Teiichi Akashi	July 29, 1981	116
"Living for Tomorrow!": Arale finds a camera which will show the future. She takes everyone's photo with the camera to see how the future will be 10 years later. All of her friends become 23 years old, but Arale is still the same.... "Arale is Akane!?": Arale Norimaki and Akane Kimidori decide to change their appearance to look like each other and spend the rest of their day pretending to be the other.
17	17	"Fear the Monster's Night"; Transliteration: "Kyōfu no monsutāzu naito" (Japanese: 恐怖のモンスターズナイト)	Minoru Okazaki	Ayuko Anzai	Rie Nishiyama	Toshikazu Yamaguchi	August 5, 1981	117
Trampire and her follower Franken come to Senbei's house for fresh blood and money. Trampire tries to drink Arale's blood, but it's impossible since Arale is an android. Then, Arale and Gatchan start sleepwalking and scare the two monsters away.
18	18	"The Fairy Tale Machine"; Transliteration: "Otogi Mashīn" (Japanese: おとぎマシーン)	Yūji Katō	Masaki Tsuji	Katsumi Aoshima	Mataji Urata	August 12, 1981	118
18	18	"Shiverman the Hitman"; Transliteration: "Koroshi no Bibiruman" (Japanese: 殺しのびびるマン)	Yūji Katō	Masaki Tsuji	Katsumi Aoshima	Shōji Suyama	August 12, 1981	118
"The Fairy Tale Machine": Arale and Gatchan have gone to the world of fairy tales by Wonder machine. In "the Peach Boy" world, she becomes friends with devils and they start playing a game of tag together. Then, Arale starts changing the fairy tale. "Shiverman the Hitman": Joe wants to get revenge over Arale Norimaki, and he hires the Shiverman. Arale, Gatchan and the Shiverman end up inside Arale's "King Kong" book by the Fairy Tale Machine.
19	19	"Arale Swims in the Ancient Past"; Transliteration: "Arare ōmukashi e kaisuiyoku ni" (Japanese: アラレ大昔へ海水浴に)	Akinori Nagaoka	Tomoko Konparu	Sadayoshi Tominaga	Teiichi Akashi	August 19, 1981	119
Arale and Gatchan time slip to a "long time ago" to go swimming without telling Senbei. Senbei starts to worry because they are not coming home.
20	20	"Kinoko on the Loose"; Transliteration: "Kinoko-chan iede" (Japanese: きのこちゃん家出)	Directed by : Yūji Katō; Storyboarded by : Hiromitsu Morita	Shun'ichi Yukimuro	Mitsuo Shindō	Tadao Kubota	August 26, 1981	120
Kinoko's father accidentally eats her favorite strawberry. Kinoko gets so angry, so she decides to leave home and tries to become a bad girl.
21	21	"The Great Space Date Adventure"; Transliteration: "Uchū de dēto daibōken" (Japanese: 宇宙でデート大冒険)	Akinori Nagaoka	Shun'ichi Yukimuro	Rie Nishiyama	Shōji Suyama	September 9, 1981	TBA
Senbei, and Ms. Yamabuki go to outer space. While they are flying in outer space, Senbei wants to go to bathroom, so he decides to land on the closest planet. However, once they land on the planet, Ms. Yamabuki is kidnapped by a monster.
22	22	"Dumbfounded Senbei"; Transliteration: "Odoroki Sen-chan" (Japanese: おどろきセンちゃん)	Masayuki Ôzeki	Shun'ichi Yukimuro	Toshiki Hirano	Teiichi Akashi	September 16, 1981	TBA
When Senbei returns to Earth, they meet old Akane and Taro. When Senbei tells his name, they don't believe him. Because, according to them, the real Senbei never returned to Earth since he left 50 years ago.
23	23	"Arale's Hoyoyo Date"; Transliteration: "Arare no hoyoyo dēto" (Japanese: アラレのほよよデート)	Directed by : Yūji Katō; Storyboarded by : Saburo Nodera	Tomoko Konparu	Toyoo Ashida	Toshikazu Yamaguchi	September 23, 1981	TBA
23	23	"Bye-Bye Super Power"; Transliteration: "Bai bai metchanko pawā" (Japanese: バイバイメッチャンコパワー)	Directed by : Yūji Katō; Storyboarded by : Saburo Nodera	Tomoko Konparu	Sadayoshi Tominaga	Toshikazu Yamaguchi	September 23, 1981	TBA
"Arale's Hoyoyo Date": Arale and Bancho decide to have a date. Arale thinks "to have a date" means to hold each other's hand, so she starts holding Bancho's hand very tight. "Bye-Bye Super Power": Tired of being beaten by her, Senbei Norimaki decides to reduce Arale Norimaki's power to that of a normal girl.
24	24	"Arale's Big Change!!"; Transliteration: "Arare-chan daihenshin!!" (Japanese: アラレちゃん大変身!!)	Directed by : Toyoo Ashida & Yūji Katō; Storyboarded by : Katsumi Endō	Toshiki Inoue	Toyoo Ashida	Tadao Kubota	September 30, 1981	TBA
A cricket jumps into Arale's mouth while she is sleeping. After she eats the cricket, she becomes a different girl. Now, she is very calm and very serious, so everybody starts to worry about her.
SP2	24.5	"Penguin Village SOS!!"; Transliteration: "Pengin mura SOS!!" (Japanese: ペンギン村SOS!!)	Minoru Okazaki	Ayuko Anzai	Mitsuo Shindō	Shōji Suyama	October 7, 1981	TBA
SP2	24.5	"Affairs of the Heart!"; Transliteration: "Hāto de shōbu!" (Japanese: ハートで勝負!)	Masayuki Ôzeki	Shun'ichi Yukimuro	Toshiki Hirano	Takamura Mukuo	October 7, 1981	TBA
SP2	24.5	"Anything is OK, Mr. Handy"; Transliteration: "Nandemo OK Ōcha-kun" (Japanese: なんでもOKオーチャくん)	Masayuki Ôzeki	Shun'ichi Yukimuro	Ikuo Fudaki	Takamura Mukuo	October 7, 1981	TBA
25	25	"The Exchange Student from Metropolis Island"; Transliteration: "Tokai-tō kara no tenkōsei" (Japanese: 都会島からの転校生)	Directed by : Toyoo Ashida & Yūji Katō; Storyboarded by : Katsumi Endō	Tomoko Konparu	Toyoo Ashida	Teiichi Akashi	October 14, 1981	TBA
26	26	"The Great Arale-Eye Caper!!"; Transliteration: "Arare me daisakusen!!" (Japanese: アラレ目大作戦!!)	Akinori Nagaoka	Shun'ichi Yukimuro	Minoru Maeda	Takamura Mukuo	October 21, 1981	TBA
Senbei fits a miniature spy camera in Arale to survey her activities and get a glimpse at Miss Yamabuki's panties. His plan works, but he proceeds to make a video recorder and sends Arale to take a bath with Miss Yamabuki, so he can record a video of Yamabuki's naked body. This does not work out for him with Arale being distracted and Donbe makes Senbei's plan backfire.
27	27	"Yay! A New Friend"; Transliteration: "Wāi! Atarashii otomodachi" (Japanese: ワーイ!新しいお友だち)	Akinori Nagaoka	Tomoko Konparu	Rie Nishiyama	Teiichi Akashi	October 28, 1981	TBA
28	28	"Goodbye, Gatchan!!"; Transliteration: "Sayōnara Gatchan!!" (Japanese: さようなら ガッちゃん!!)	Minoru Okazaki	Tomoko Konparu	Sadayoshi Tominaga	Takamura Mukuo	November 4, 1981	TBA
29	29	"How Adorable! The Lovely Middle-aged Trio"; Transliteration: "Kawayui! Raburī ossan torio" (Japanese: かわゆい! ラブリーおっさんトリオ)	Directed by : Toyoo Ashida & Yūji Katō; Storyboarded by : Katsumi Endō	Toshiki Inoue	Toyoo Ashida	Takamura Mukuo	November 11, 1981	TBA
30	30	"A Pounding Heart! Peasuke's First Love"; Transliteration: "Dokidoki wakuwaku! Hatsukoi Pīsuke" (Japanese: ドキドキわくわく! はつこいピースケ)	Akinori Nagaoka	Shun'ichi Yukimuro	Kazuo Komatsubara	Shōji Suyama	November 18, 1981	TBA
31	31	"The Araletouchables"; Transliteration: "Araretatchaburu" (Japanese: アラレタッチャブル)	Directed by : Yūji Katō; Storyboarded by : Katsumi Endō	Toshiki Inoue	Seiichi Nodate	Takamura Mukuo	November 25, 1981	TBA
32	32	"Arale's Lullaby Dream"; Transliteration: "Arare no rarabai dorīmu" (Japanese: アラレのララバイ・ドリーム)	Toyoo Ashida & Yūji Katō	Shun'ichi Yukimuro	Yukio Ebisawa	Takamura Mukuo	December 2, 1981	TBA
33	33	"A Masterpiece!? Little Cat Riding Hood"; Transliteration: "Meisaku!? Nekozukin-chan" (Japanese: 名作!? ネコずきんちゃん)	Minoru Okazaki	Tomoko Konparu	Rie Nishiyama	Takamura Mukuo	December 9, 1981	TBA
34	34	"Chibiru: Hell's Messenger"; Transliteration: "Jigoku no shisha Chibiru-kun" (Japanese: 地獄の使者チビルくん)	Masayuki Ôzeki	Shun'ichi Yukimuro	Sadayoshi Tominaga	Takamura Mukuo	December 16, 1981	TBA
35	35	"Sad Sad Santa"; Transliteration: "Sanzan Santa-san" (Japanese: さんざんサンタさん)	Directed by : Yūji Katō; Storyboarded by : Katsumi Endō	Shun'ichi Yukimuro & Takashi Derute	Toyoo Ashida	Takamura Mukuo	December 23, 1981	TBA
36	36	"Messed-up Devil Girl"; Transliteration: "Hachamecha debirugyaru" (Japanese: はちゃめちゃでびるぎゃる)	Masayuki Ôzeki	Toshiki Inoue	Mitsuo Shindō	Shōji Suyama	December 30, 1981	TBA
SP3	36.5	"The Legend of Penguin Village's Heroes"; Transliteration: "Pengin mura eiyū densetsu" (Japanese: ペンギン村英雄伝説)	Akinori Nagaoka	Tomoko Konparu	Ikuo Fudaki	Motoyuki Tanaka	January 2, 1982	TBA
37	37	"Arale's Musical: Cinderella"; Transliteration: "Arare no myūjikaru shinderera" (Japanese: アラレのミュージカル・シンデレラ)	Toyoo Ashida & Yūji Katō	Masaki Tsuji & Takashi Derute	Toyoo Ashida & Yukio Ebisawa	Takamura Mukuo	January 6, 1982	TBA
38	38	"The Mysterious Dr. Monster?!"; Transliteration: "Nazo no Kaijū-hakase?!" (Japanese: なぞの怪獣博士?!)	Directed by : Yūji Katō; Storyboarded by : Katsumi Endō	Toshiki Inoue	Mitsuo Shindō	Shōji Suyama	January 13, 1982	TBA
39	39	"Showdown! Musashi vs. Arale"; Transliteration: "Taiketsu! Musashi VS Arare-chan" (Japanese: 対決!ムサシVSアラレちゃん)	Minoru Okazaki	Tomoko Konparu	Rie Nishiyama	Takamura Mukuo	January 20, 1982	TBA
40	40	"Our Hero Suppaman Part II"; Transliteration: "Eiyū Suppaman pāto tsū" (Japanese: 英雄スッパマン・パートII)	Toyoo Ashida & Yūji Katō	Shun'ichi Yukimuro	Toyoo Ashida	Takamura Mukuo	January 27, 1982	TBA
41	41	"The Reality Machine"; Transliteration: "Honmono mashīn" (Japanese: ホンモノマシーン)	Akinori Nagaoka	Ayuko Anzai	Sadayoshi Tominaga	Takamura Mukuo	February 3, 1982	TBA
41	41	"Bikers at Dawn"; Transliteration: "Yoake no bōsōzoku" (Japanese: 夜明けの暴走族)	Akinori Nagaoka	Ayuko Anzai	Sadayoshi Tominaga	Takamura Mukuo	February 3, 1982	TBA
42	42	"Parzan: King of the Jungle"; Transliteration: "Janguru no ōja Pāzan" (Japanese: ジャングルの王者パーザン)	Directed by : Yūji Katō; Storyboarded by : Katsumi Endō	Michiru Shimada	Seiichi Nodate	Takamura Mukuo	February 10, 1982	TBA
43	43	"Whoa?! Penguin Village Dom-Dom-Dom"; Transliteration: "Aya?! Dododo de Pengin mura" (Japanese: あや?! ドドドでペンギン村)	Akinori Nagaoka	Shun'ichi Yukimuro	Mitsuo Shindō	Shōji Suyama	February 17, 1982	TBA
44	44	"Arale Goes to Metropolis Island"; Transliteration: "Arare-chan tokai-tō e iku" (Japanese: アラレちゃん都会島へ行く)	Yūji Katō	Shun'ichi Yukimuro	Toyoo Ashida	Takamura Mukuo	February 24, 1982	TBA
45	45	"The Devilish Transformation"; Transliteration: "Akuma no henshingokko" (Japanese: 悪魔の変身ごっコ)	Minoru Okazaki	Tomoko Konparu	Sadayoshi Tominaga	Shōji Suyama	March 3, 1982	TBA
46	46	"From Penguin Village with Love"; Transliteration: "Pengin mura yori ai o komete" (Japanese: ペンギン村より愛をこめて)	Directed by : Toyoo Ashida & Hiroki Shibata; Storyboarded by : Kōsei Maeda	Toshiki Inoue	Yukio Ebisawa	Toshikazu Yamaguchi	March 10, 1982	TBA
47	47	"Caveman Hoyoyo in the Dinosaur Age"; Transliteration: "Hoyoyo genjin kyōryū jidai" (Japanese: ホヨヨ原人・恐竜時代)	Minoru Okazaki	Michiru Shimada	Rie Nishiyama	Jin Kageyama	March 17, 1982	TBA
48	48	"Chibiru's Work"; Transliteration: "Chibiru-kun no arubeito" (Japanese: チビルくんのアルバイト)	Directed by : Yūji Katō; Storyboarded by : Katsumi Endō	Shun'ichi Yukimuro	Seiichi Nodate	Jin Kageyama	March 24, 1982	TBA
49	49	"Leave it to Akiko"; Transliteration: "Atashi omakase Akiko-san" (Japanese: アタシおまかせアキコさん)	Akinori Nagaoka	Tomoko Konparu	Jōji Yanase	Toshikazu Yamaguchi	March 31, 1982	TBA
50	50	"Yay! A Date for Mr. Copy"; Transliteration: "Wāi! Dēto da Kopī-kun" (Japanese: ワーイ! デートだコピーくん)	Toyoo Ashida & Hiroe Arakawa	Toshiki Inoue	Toyoo Ashida & Yukio Ebisawa	Jin Kageyama	April 7, 1982	TBA

=== Season 2 (1982-83) ===
No. overall	No. in season	Title	Directed by	Written by	Animation directed by	Art directed by	Original release date
51	1	"Thanks! The Kick The Can Celebration Party"; Transliteration: "Angato! Shaon kankeri taikai" (Japanese: あんがと! 謝恩カンケリ大会)	Minoru Okazaki	Tomoko Konparu	Mitsuo Shindō	Toshikazu Yamaguchi	April 14, 1982
52	2	"Arale's Thieving Hoyoyo Gang"; Transliteration: "Arare no kaitō Hoyoyo-dan" (Japanese: アラレの怪盗ほよよ団)	Yūji Katō	Michiru Shimada	Toshiki Hirano	Jin Kageyama	April 21, 1982
53	3	"Anko and Nonko Discover the Countryside"; Transliteration: "Anko Nonko no disukabā inaka" (Japanese: アン子ノン子のディスカバー・いなか)	Directed by : Yūji Katō; Storyboarded by : Katsumi Endō	Tomoko Konparu	Sadayoshi Tominaga	Shōji Suyama	April 28, 1982
54	4	"The Children's Day Festival Poke Poke Huff Puff"; Transliteration: "Kodomomatsuri pusupusu hafuhafu" (Japanese: こども祭ぷすぷす・はふはふ)	Toyoo Ashida & Hiroe Arakawa	Michiru Shimada	Toyoo Ashida	Jin Kageyama	May 5, 1982
55	5	"Super Driver"; Transliteration: "Sūpā doraibā" (Japanese: すうぱー・どらいばー)	Directed by : Hiroki Shibata; Storyboarded by : Kōsei Maeda	Shun'ichi Yukimuro	Mitsuo Shindō	Jin Kageyama	May 12, 1982
56	6	"Am I Super Strong?!"; Transliteration: "Watashitte muchanko tsuoi?!" (Japanese: わたしってむちゃんこつおい?!)	Minoru Okazaki	Toshiki Inoue	Rie Nishiyama	Yûji Ikeda	May 19, 1982
57	7	"The Miniature House of Our Dreams"; Transliteration: "Yume no minichua waga ke" (Japanese: 夢のみにちゅあわが家)	Directed by : Yūji Katō; Storyboarded by : Katsumi Endō	Shun'ichi Yukimuro	Seiichi Nodate	Jin Kageyama	May 26, 1982
58	8	"Arale's Thieving Hoyoyo Gang Part II"; Transliteration: "Arare no kaitō Hoyoyo-dan pāto tsū" (Japanese: アラレの怪盗ほよよ団・パートII)	Yūji Katō	Toshiki Inoue	Mitsuo Shindō	Jin Kageyama	June 2, 1982
59	9	"The Super Exciting Time Stopper"; Transliteration: "Dokidoki wakuwaku taimu sutoppu" (Japanese: ドキドキわくわくタイム・ストップ)	Directed by : Toyoo Ashida & Hiroki Shibata; Storyboarded by : Hiroshi Yoshida	Hirohisa Soda	Yukio Ebisawa	Yûji Ikeda	June 9, 1982
60	10	"Suppaman In Danger"; Transliteration: "Suppaman kiki ippatsu" (Japanese: スッパマン危機一髪)	Directed by : Yūji Katō; Storyboarded by : Katsumi Endō	Shun'ichi Yukimuro	Sadayoshi Tominaga	Jin Kageyama	June 16, 1982
61	11	"Adventure! Inside Mammoth Midori-chan"; Transliteration: "Tanken! Manmosu Midori-chan" (Japanese: 探検! マンモスみどりちゃん)	Toyoo Ashida & Hiroe Arakawa	Michiru Shimada	Toyoo Ashida	Jin Kageyama	June 23, 1982
62	12	"Scaary! Monster Prince"; Transliteration: "Kowaai! Monsutā purinsu" (Japanese: こわーい! モンスター・プリンス)	Minoru Okazaki	Tomoko Konparu	Rie Nishiyama	Teiichi Akashi	June 30, 1982
63	13	"Arale's New Star Festival Story"; Transliteration: "Arare no shintanabata monogatari" (Japanese: アラレの新たなばたものがたり)	Directed by : Yūji Katō; Storyboarded by : Katsumi Endō	Michiru Shimada	Yukio Ebisawa	Jin Kageyama	July 7, 1982
64	14	"Goo Goo Ga Ga Senbei"; Transliteration: "Babubabu Senbē" (Japanese: ばぶばぶセンベエ)	Minoru Okazaki	Toshiki Inoue	Sadayoshi Tominaga	Jin Kageyama	July 14, 1982
65	15	"The Twinkling Night Sky Drum and Fife Band"; Transliteration: "Kirakira yozora no kotekitai" (Japanese: キラキラ夜空の鼓笛隊)	Directed by : Hiroki Shibata; Storyboarded by : Kōsei Maeda	Shun'ichi Yukimuro	Seiichi Nodate	Teiichi Akashi	July 21, 1982
66	16	"We're No Angels"; Transliteration: "Ore-tacha tenshi ja nai" (Japanese: オレたちゃ天使じゃない)	Yūji Katō	Toshiki Inoue	Mitsuo Shindō	Jin Kageyama	July 28, 1982
67	17	"A Romance Fairy Tale!! Tricycle Stories"; Transliteration: "Ai no meruhen!! Sanrinsha monogatari" (Japanese: 愛のメルヘン!! 三輪車物語)	Directed by : Yūji Katō; Storyboarded by : Katsumi Endō	Shun'ichi Yukimuro	Sadayoshi Tominaga	Jin Kageyama	August 4, 1982
68	18	"The Great Combot Caper of 2013"; Transliteration: "2013nen, konbotto daisakusen" (Japanese: 2013年、コンボット大作戦)	Minoru Okazaki	Michiru Shimada	Rie Nishiyama	Teiichi Akashi	August 11, 1982
69	19	"The Invader from Space"; Transliteration: "Uchū kara no shinryakusha" (Japanese: 宇宙からの侵略者)	Directed by : Yūji Katō; Storyboarded by : Katsumi Endō	Tomoko Konparu	Yukio Ebisawa	Jin Kageyama	August 18, 1982
70	20	"Arale's Arabian Nights"; Transliteration: "Arare no Arabian naito" (Japanese: アラレのあらびあんないと)	Toyoo Ashida & Hiroe Arakawa	Tomoko Konparu	Seiichi Nodate	Jin Kageyama	August 25, 1982
71	21	"Dr. Mashirito's Ambition"; Transliteration: "Dokutā Mashirito no yabō" (Japanese: Dr.マシリトの野望)	Directed by : Yūji Katō; Storyboarded by : Kōsei Maeda	Toshiki Inoue	Mitsuo Shindō	Mataji Urata	September 1, 1982
72	22	"Dr. Mashirito's Ambition"; Transliteration: "Dokutā Mashirito no yabō" (Japanese: Dr.マシリトの野望)	Directed by : Yūji Katō; Storyboarded by : Hiromitsu Morita	Toshiki Inoue	Sadayoshi Tominaga	Yûji Ikeda	September 8, 1982
73	23	"Penguin Village Wars"; Transliteration: "Pengin mura wōzu" (Japanese: ペンギン村ウォーズ)	Minoru Okazaki	Shun'ichi Yukimuro	Minoru Maeda	Jin Kageyama	September 15, 1982
74	24	"Penguin Village Wars"; Transliteration: "Pengin mura wōzu" (Japanese: ペンギン村ウォーズ)	Yūji Katō	Shun'ichi Yukimuro	Sadayoshi Tominaga	Jin Kageyama	September 22, 1982
75	25	"Arale's Lost Item"; Transliteration: "Arare-chan no nakushimono" (Japanese: アラレちゃんのなくしもの)	Directed by : Hiroki Shibata; Storyboarded by : Katsumi Endō	Toshiki Inoue	Jōji Yanase	Jin Kageyama	September 29, 1982
76	26	"Tale of the Penguin Village of Eight Gravestones"; Transliteration: "Pengin mura yatsuhaka monogatari" (Japanese: ペンギン村八ッ墓ものがたり)	Toyoo Ashida & Hiroe Arakawa	Michiru Shimada & Toyoo Ashida	Toyoo Ashida	Mataji Urata	October 6, 1982
77	27	"Suppaman of Justice VS Senbei of Love"; Transliteration: "Seigi no Suppaman VS ai no Senbē" (Japanese: 正義のスッパマンVS愛のセンベエ)	Akinori Nagaoka	Shun'ichi Yukimuro	Mitsuo Shindō	Jin Kageyama	October 13, 1982
78	28	"Happy Date in Mystery Land"; Transliteration: "Runrun dēto fushigi no kuni" (Japanese: るんるんデートふしぎの国)	Yūji Katō	Michiru Shimada	Seiichi Nodate	Jin Kageyama	October 20, 1982
79	29	"Energetic Arale"; Transliteration: "Harikiri Arare-chan" (Japanese: はりきりアラレちゃん)	Directed by : Hiroe Arakawa; Storyboarded by : Yukio Ebisawa	Toshiki Inoue	Yukio Ebisawa	Yoshiyuki Yamamoto	October 27, 1982
80	30	"Penguin Village Grand Prix"; Transliteration: "Pengin mura guranpuri" (Japanese: ペンギン村グランプリ)	Minoru Okazaki	Shun'ichi Yukimuro	Minoru Maeda	Jin Kageyama	November 3, 1982
81	31	"Penguin Village Grand Prix"; Transliteration: "Pengin mura guranpuri" (Japanese: ペンギン村グランプリ)	Directed by : Hiroe Arakawa; Storyboarded by : Katsumi Endō	Shun'ichi Yukimuro	Sadayoshi Tominaga	Jin Kageyama	November 10, 1982
82	32	"Penguin Village Grand Prix"; Transliteration: "Pengin mura guranpuri" (Japanese: ペンギン村グランプリ)	Hiroki Shibata	Shun'ichi Yukimuro	Mitsuo Shindō	Mataji Urata	November 17, 1982
83	33	"Penguin Village Mystery"; Transliteration: "Pengin mura misuterī" (Japanese: ペンギン村ミステリー)	Toyoo Ashida & Yūji Katō	Toshiki Inoue	Toyoo Ashida	Jin Kageyama	November 24, 1982
84	34	"Big Head Cometh"; Transliteration: "Dekkai atama ga yattekita" (Japanese: でっかいアタマがやってきた)	Yūji Katō	Michiru Shimada	Sadayoshi Tominaga	Jin Kageyama	December 1, 1982
85	35	"The Terrifying Vegetable Men"; Transliteration: "Kyōfu no bejitaburu ojisan" (Japanese: 恐怖のベジタブルおじさん)	Directed by : Hiroe Arakawa; Storyboarded by : Katsumi Endō	Michiru Shimada	Seiichi Nodate	Mataji Urata	December 8, 1982
86	36	"The Secret of Arale's Birth"; Transliteration: "Arare shussei no himitsu" (Japanese: アラレ出生のひみつ)	Minoru Okazaki	Toshiki Inoue	Minoru Maeda	Jin Kageyama	December 15, 1982
87	37	"Arale the Super Prize Girl"; Transliteration: "Arare no metchauri no shōjo" (Japanese: アラレのマッチ売りの少女)	Directed by : Hiroe Arakawa; Storyboarded by : Yukio Ebisawa	Michiru Shimada	Yukio Ebisawa	Jin Kageyama	December 22, 1982
88	38	"The Tale of the Red Sandal Strings"; Transliteration: "Akai hanao monogatari" (Japanese: 赤い鼻緒ものがたり)	Toyoo Ashida & Yūji Katō	Michiru Shimada	Toyoo Ashida	Jin Kageyama	December 29, 1982
SP4	38.5	"Dr. Slump: Arale-chan Special: A New World Wonder Made Public in Penguin Village!"; Transliteration: "Dr. Suranpu arare-chan pengin-mura no nanafushigi zen kōkai! Supesharu" (Japanese: Dr.スランプ アラレちゃん ペンギン村の七ふしぎ全公開!スペシャル)	-	-	-	-	December 31, 1982
A special which features rebroadcasts of past episodes, including a broadcast of Dr. Slump and Arale-chan: Hello! Wonder Island.
89	39	"Here Comes the Tsuns"; Transliteration: "Tsun-san ikki ga yattekita" (Japanese: 摘さん一家がやってきた)	Hiroki Shibata	Toshiki Inoue	Mitsuo Shindō	Mataji Urata	January 5, 1983
90	40	"How Exciting! School Panic"; Transliteration: "Wakuwaku! Sukūru panikku" (Japanese: わくわく! スクール・パニック)	Directed by : Hiroe Arakawa; Storyboarded by : Katsumi Endō	Toshiki Inoue	Sadayoshi Tominaga	Jin Kageyama	January 12, 1983
91	41	"Look, Look, the Lensmen"; Transliteration: "Mieru mieru Renzumanzu" (Japanese: みえるみえるレンズマンズ)	Yūji Katō	Michiru Shimada	Masayuki Uchiyama	Jin Kageyama	January 19, 1983
92	42	"Shooting Star, Wishing Star"; Transliteration: "Nagareboshi negaiboshi" (Japanese: 流れ星・願い星)	Directed by : Hiroki Shibata; Storyboarded by : Katsumi Endō	Michiru Shimada	Minoru Maeda	Teiichi Akashi	January 26, 1983
93	43	"Luck In, Evil Out in Space"; Transliteration: "Fukuha uchi oniha uchū" (Japanese: フクハ内オニハ宇宙)	Directed by : Yūji Katō; Storyboarded by : Kōsei Maeda	Toshiki Inoue	Yukio Ebisawa	Jin Kageyama	February 2, 1983
94	44	"The Angel Lives!"; Transliteration: "Enjeru wa ikiteita!" (Japanese: エンジェルは生きていた!)	Hiroki Shibata	Takao Koyama	Mitsuo Shindō	Jin Kageyama	February 9, 1983
95	45	"Nikochan Flies"; Transliteration: "Soratobu Nikochan" (Japanese: 空飛ぶニコチャン)	Directed by : Minoru Okazaki; Storyboarded by : Katsumi Endō	Keiji Terui	Minoru Maeda	Jin Kageyama	February 16, 1983
96	46	"Ghost Date"; Transliteration: "Obake DE dēto" (Japanese: オバケDEデート)	Directed by : Hiroki Shibata; Storyboarded by : Yūji Katō	Michiru Shimada	Minoru Maeda	Jin Kageyama	February 23, 1983
97	47	"Love is a Punch to the Heart"; Transliteration: "Koi wa hāto de panchi" (Japanese: 恋はハートでパンチ)	Directed by : Hiroe Arakawa; Storyboarded by : Katsumi Endō	Michiru Shimada	Masayuki Uchiyama	Yoshiyuki Yamamoto	March 2, 1983
98	48	"Farewell, Tsuns"; Transliteration: "Sayonara Tsun-san ikki" (Japanese: さよなら摘さん一家)	Minoru Okazaki	Keiji Terui	Minoru Maeda	Jin Kageyama	March 9, 1983
99	49	"Mr. Skop Awakes"; Transliteration: "Sukoppu-kun no mezame" (Japanese: スコップくんのめざめ)	Toyoo Ashida & Hiroe Arakawa	Michiru Shimada	Toyoo Ashida	Teiichi Akashi	March 16, 1983
100	50	"Official Business! The Space Gumshoe Story"; Transliteration: "Goyō da! Uchū torimonochō" (Japanese: ご用だ! 宇宙捕物帳)	Directed by : Hiroe Arakawa; Storyboarded by : Yukio Ebisawa	Takao Koyama	Yukio Ebisawa	Yoshiyuki Yamamoto	March 23, 1983
101	51	"The Secret of Castle Mashirito"; Transliteration: "Mashirito-jō no himitsu" (Japanese: マシリト城のひみつ)	Hiroki Shibata	Toshiki Inoue	Mitsuo Shindō	Jin Kageyama	March 30, 1983
102	52	"Adventure, Adventure, Great Adventure!!"; Transliteration: "Bōken, bōken, daibōken!!" (Japanese: ぼうけん、冒険、大冒険!!)	Minoru Okazaki	Michiru Shimada	Minoru Maeda	Jin Kageyama	April 6, 1983

=== Season 3 (1983-84) ===
No. overall	No. in season	Title	Directed by	Written by	Animation directed by	Art directed by	Original release date
103	1	"The Thief who Loved Books"; Transliteration: "Ban no daisuki dorobō-san" (Japanese: 本が大すきドロボーさん)	Directed by : Hiroe Arakawa; Storyboarded by : Katsumi Endō	Toshiki Inoue	Masayuki Uchiyama	Yoshiyuki Yamamoto	April 13, 1983
104	2	"Ai-yay-yay Arale's Field Trip"; Transliteration: "Harehore Arare no shūgakuryokō" (Japanese: ハレホレアラレの修学旅行)	Directed by : Minoru Okazaki; Storyboarded by : Katsumi Endō	Takao Koyama	Minoru Maeda	Jin Kageyama	April 20, 1983
105	3	"The Three Suppamen"; Transliteration: "Sannin no Suppaman" (Japanese: 三人のスッパマン)	Directed by : Hiroe Arakawa; Storyboarded by : Katsumi Endō	Keiji Terui	Masayuki Uchiyama	Yoshiyuki Yamamoto	April 27, 1983
106	4	"The Yellow Carp Banner of Happiness"; Transliteration: "Shiawase no kiiroi koi no bori" (Japanese: しあわせの黄色いコイのぼり)	Hiroki Shibata	Takao Koyama	Mitsuo Shindō	Teiichi Akashi	May 4, 1983
107	5	"The Kon-Kon Morph Helmet"; Transliteration: "Henshin Kon-kon Herumetto" (Japanese: 変身コンコンヘルメット)	Directed by : Toyoo Ashida & Hiroe Arakawa; Storyboarded by : Seiji Okuda	Toshiki Inoue	Toyoo Ashida	Jin Kageyama	May 11, 1983
108	6	"Welcome, Gangsters"; Transliteration: "Yakuzaya-san irasshai" (Japanese: やくざ屋さんいらっしゃい)	Minoru Okazaki	Keiji Terui	Minoru Maeda	Mataji Urata	May 18, 1983
109	7	"Continue! We are the Suppamen"; Transliteration: "Tsuzuke! Warera ga Suppaman ni" (Japanese: つづけ! われらがスッパマンに)	Directed by : Hiroe Arakawa; Storyboarded by : Katsumi Endō	Toshiki Inoue	Yukio Ebisawa	Teiichi Akashi	May 25, 1983
110	8	"Chibiru and the Devil's Dictionary"; Transliteration: "Chibiru to akuma no daijiten" (Japanese: チビルと悪魔の大辞典)	Minoru Okazaki	Michiru Shimada	Minoru Maeda	Jin Kageyama	June 1, 1983
111	9	"Kinoko, Teacher for a Day"; Transliteration: "Kinoko no ichinichi sensei" (Japanese: きのこの一日せんせい)	Directed by : Toyoo Ashida & Hiroe Arakawa; Storyboarded by : Seiji Okuda	Toshiki Inoue	Toyoo Ashida	Mataji Urata	June 8, 1983
112	10	"Four Angry Rogues"; Transliteration: "Ikareru yonin no narazumono" (Japanese: 怒れる四人のならず者)	Directed by : Hiroe Arakawa; Storyboarded by : Katsumi Endō	Takao Koyama	Masayuki Uchiyama	Yoshiyuki Yamamoto	June 15, 1983
113	11	"Love Excursion SOS!!"; Transliteration: "Ai no ensoku SOS!!" (Japanese: 愛のえんそくSOS!!)	Hiroki Shibata	Michiru Shimada	Mitsuo Shindō	Teiichi Akashi	June 22, 1983
114	12	"Arale's Diary"; Transliteration: "Arare no enikki" (Japanese: アラレの絵日記)	Directed by : Hiroe Arakawa; Storyboarded by : Katsumi Endō	Kei Kojima	Minoru Maeda	Mataji Urata	June 29, 1983
115	13	"The Demon of Penguin Village"; Transliteration: "Pengin mura daimajin" (Japanese: ペンギンむら大魔神)	Directed by : Toyoo Ashida & Hiroe Arakawa; Storyboarded by : Seiji Okuda	Keiji Terui	Yukio Ebisawa	Hidenobu Hata	July 6, 1983
116	14	"Super Baseball"; Transliteration: "Sūpā beisubōru" (Japanese: すうぱーベイスボール)	Minoru Okazaki	Michiru Shimada	Minoru Maeda	Teiichi Akashi	July 13, 1983
117	15	"Farewell, King Nikochan"; Transliteration: "Sayonara Nikochan-daiō" (Japanese: さよならニコチャン大王)	Directed by : Hiroe Arakawa; Storyboarded by : Katsumi Endō	Takao Koyama	Masayuki Uchiyama	Hidenobu Hata	July 20, 1983
118	16	"Showdown in Space! Arale VS Komattachan"; Transliteration: "Uchū no taiketsu! Arare VS Komattachan" (Japanese: 宇宙の対決! アラレVSコマッタチャン)	Directed by : Hiroe Arakawa; Storyboarded by : Katsumi Endō	Keiji Terui	Minoru Maeda	Mataji Urata	July 27, 1983
119	17	"Runabout Youth"; Transliteration: "Kakemeguru seishun" (Japanese: かけめぐる青春)	Hiroki Shibata	Michiru Shimada	Mitsuo Shindō	Hidenobu Hata	August 3, 1983
120	18	"The Decision! The Penguin Village Champion"; Transliteration: "Kettei! Pengin mura chanpion" (Japanese: 決定! ペンギン村チャンピオン)	Directed by : Minoru Okazaki; Storyboarded by : Minoru Maeda	Toshiki Inoue	Minoru Maeda	Teiichi Akashi	August 10, 1983
121	19	"The Beauty who Disappeared in the Mystery Mist"; Transliteration: "Misuterī kiri ni kieta bijo" (Japanese: ミステリー霧に消えた美女)	Directed by : Hiroe Arakawa; Storyboarded by : Seiji Okuda	Takao Koyama	Tomoyuki Matsumoto	Hidenobu Hata	August 17, 1983
122	20	"Lovable Contact Lenses"; Transliteration: "Suki suki kontakuto" (Japanese: すきすきコンタクト)	Directed by : Hiroe Arakawa; Storyboarded by : Katsumi Endō	Keiji Terui	Masayuki Uchiyama	Mataji Urata	August 24, 1983
123	21	"I Did it! The Great Proposal Plan"; Transliteration: "Yata! Puropōzu daisakusen" (Japanese: やた! プロポーズ大作戦)	Directed by : Kazuhisa Takenouchi; Storyboarded by : Katsumi Endō	Michiru Shimada	Yukio Ebisawa	Hidenobu Hata	August 31, 1983
124	22	"Marriage! Marriage!! The Doctor and the Teacher"; Transliteration: "Kekkon! Kekkon!! Hakase to sensei" (Japanese: けっこん! 結婚!! ハカセとセンセー)	Minoru Okazaki	Toshiki Inoue	Minoru Maeda	Isamu Tsuchida	September 7, 1983
125	23	"A Honeymoon of Flying Love"; Transliteration: "Soratobu ai no hanemūn" (Japanese: 空とぶ愛のハネムーン)	Hiroki Shibata	Michiru Shimada	Masayuki Uchiyama	Hidenobu Hata	September 14, 1983
126	24	"Exciting Newlywed Life"; Transliteration: "Wakuwaku Shinkon Life" (Japanese: わくわく新婚ライフ)	Directed by : Hiroe Arakawa; Storyboarded by : Katsumi Endō	Michiru Shimada	Mitsuo Shindō	Isamu Tsuchida	September 21, 1983
127	25	"Arale Watch Out! The Strongest Rival Appears"; Transliteration: "Arale Ayaushi! Saikyou no Rival Shuugen" (Japanese: アラレ危うし! 最強のライバル出現)	Minoru Okazaki	Michiru Shimada	Minoru Maeda	Hidenobu Hata	September 28, 1983
128	26	"Torn Between Justice and Love"; Transliteration: "Seigi to Ai no Itabasami" (Japanese: 正義と愛の板ばさみ)	Directed by : Daisuke Nishio; Storyboarded by : Katsumi Endō	Toshiki Inoue	Minoru Maeda	Isamu Tsuchida	October 5, 1983
129	27	"Finally Appears! Hit Man Senbei"; Transliteration: "Yatte Kita! Koroshiya Senbee" (Japanese: やってきた! 殺し屋センベエ)	Yoshio Mukainakano & Hiroe Arakawa	Keiko Fukuoka	Tomoyuki Matsumoto	Mataji Urata	October 12, 1983
130	28	"I'm Obotchaman"; Transliteration: "Boku, Obocchaman" (Japanese: ぼく、オボッチャマン)	Directed by : Kazuhisa Takenouchi; Storyboarded by : Yukio Ebisawa	Takao Koyama	Yukio Ebisawa	Hidenobu Hata	October 19, 1983
131	29	"Hurry! Telepathy of Love"; Transliteration: "Isoge! Ai no Telepathy" (Japanese: 急げ! 愛のテレパシー)	Hiroki Shibata	Takao Koyama	Masayuki Uchiyama	Isamu Tsuchida	October 26, 1983
132	30	"Heart Pounding Tonight"; Transliteration: "Dokidoki Tonight" (Japanese: どきどきトゥナイト)	Directed by : Daisuke Nishio; Storyboarded by : Katsumi Endō	Keiji Terui	Mitsuo Shindō	Hidenobu Hata	November 2, 1983
133	31	"There is a Placement Test"; Transliteration: "Nyuugaku Test de Gozaimasu" (Japanese: 入学テストでございます)	Minoru Okazaki	Michiru Shimada	Minoru Maeda	Mataji Urata	November 9, 1983
134	32	"Gatchan Gatchan"; Transliteration: "Gacchan Gacchan" (Japanese: ガッちゃんガッちゃん)	Directed by : Daisuke Nishio; Storyboarded by : Katsumi Endō	Keiji Terui	Minoru Maeda	Hidenobu Hata	November 23, 1983
135	33	"Yay! Crunch Crunch"; Transliteration: "Ieei! Bori Bari Bori Bari" (Japanese: イェーイ!ボリバリボリバリ)	Hiroki Shibata	Keiji Terui	Masayuki Uchiyama	Tadanao Tsuji	November 30, 1983
136	34	"Suppaman's Brother Appears!"; Transliteration: "Suppaman no Oto Sanjou!" (Japanese: スッパマンの弟参上!)	Yoshio Mukainakano & Hiroe Arakawa	Takao Koyama	Tomoyuki Matsumoto	Mataji Urata	December 7, 1983
137	35	"Nab that Crook!"; Transliteration: "Taiho Shitecho!" (Japanese: タイホしてちょ!)	Directed by : Kazuhisa Takenouchi; Storyboarded by : Katsumi Endō	Michiru Shimada	Yukio Ebisawa	Hidenobu Hata	December 14, 1983
138	36	"Christmas Day Hurts"; Transliteration: "Itai Dee Christmas" (Japanese: いたいデークリスマス)	Minoru Okazaki	Yoshifumi Yuki	Minoru Maeda	Teiichi Akashi	December 21, 1983
139	37	"To Wonderland - Taro Suppaman!"; Transliteration: "Suppaman Taro ― Otoginokuni e!" (Japanese: すっぱまん太郎―おとぎの国へ!)	Directed by : Daisuke Nishio; Storyboarded by : Katsumi Endō	Toshiki Inoue	Mitsuo Shindō	Mataji Urata	December 28, 1983
140	38	"Go For It Arale! Earth's Greatest Crisis!!"; Transliteration: "Ganbare Arale! Chikyuu Saidai no Kiki!!" (Japanese: がんばれアラレ! 地球最大の危機!!)	Yoshio Mukainakano & Kazuhisa Takenouchi	Keiji Terui	Tomoyuki Matsumoto	Mataji Urata	January 11, 1984
141	39	"Mashirito Achieves His Goal?!"; Transliteration: "Mashirito Yabou Tassei?!" (Japanese: マシリト野望達成?!)	Tomoharu Katsumata	Takao Koyama	Minoru Maeda	Fumihiro Uchikawa	January 18, 1984
142	40	"Coalescence is Bad!"; Transliteration: "Gattaishichatta!" (Japanese: 合体しちった!)	Hiroki Shibata	Toshiki Inoue	Masayuki Uchiyama	Teiichi Akashi	January 25, 1984
143	41	"Senbei Died?!"; Transliteration: "Senbee-san Shinjatta?!" (Japanese: センベエさん死んじゃった?!)	Directed by : Toyoo Ashida & Kazuhisa Takenouchi; Storyboarded by : Katsumi Endō	Michiru Shimada	Yukio Ebisawa	Mataji Urata	February 1, 1984
144	42	"Pu-pu-pu! Take to the Sky!"; Transliteration: "Pupupu! Sora wo Yuku!!" (Japanese: プププ! 空をゆく!!)	Minoru Okazaki	Keiji Terui	Minoru Maeda	Hidenobu Hata	February 8, 1984
145	43	"Donbe's Love Story"; Transliteration: "Donbe no Jama Koi Monogatari" (Japanese: ドンベのジャマ恋ものがたり)	Directed by : Daisuke Nishio; Storyboarded by : Katsumi Endō	Toshiki Inoue	Mitsuo Shindō	Mataji Urata	February 15, 1984
146	44	"Burn! Suppaman"; Transliteration: "Moe yo! Suppaman" (Japanese: 燃えよ! スッパマン)	Directed by : Kazuhisa Takenouchi; Storyboarded by : Yukio Ebisawa	Keiji Terui	Yukio Ebisawa	Teiichi Akashi	February 22, 1984
147	45	"Our Journey Together"; Transliteration: "Kimi to Boku no Tabidachi" (Japanese: キミとボクの旅だち)	Directed by : Daisuke Nishio; Storyboarded by : Tomoharu Katsumata	Keiji Terui	Minoru Maeda	Hidenobu Hata	February 29, 1984
148	46	"Gatchan is Great!!"; Transliteration: "Gacchan Erai!!" (Japanese: ガッちゃんえらい!!)	Hiroki Shibata	Michiru Shimada	Masayuki Uchiyama	Hidenobu Hata	March 7, 1984
149	47	"We'll Answer All Your Questions Special"; Transliteration: "Okotae shimasu supesharu" (Japanese: お答えします スペシャル)	Hiroki Shibata	Michiru Shimada	Masayuki Uchiyama	Mataji Urata	March 14, 1984
150	48	"Shape-up Miss Midori"; Transliteration: "Sheipuappu Midori-san" (Japanese: シェイプアップみどりさん)	Yoshio Mukainakano & Kazuhisa Takenouchi	Keiji Terui	Tomoyuki Matsumoto	Teiichi Akashi	March 21, 1984

=== Season 4 (1984-85) ===
No. overall	No. in season	Title	Directed by	Written by	Animation directed by	Art directed by	Original release date
151	1	"Turbo-kun is Born!!"; Transliteration: "Tābo-kun tanjō!!" (Japanese: ターボくん誕生!!)	Minoru Okazaki	Yoshifumi Yuki	Minoru Maeda	Shōji Suyama	March 28, 1984
152	2	"Dad is an Alien?!"; Transliteration: "Otōsan wa uchūbito?!" (Japanese: お父さんは宇宙人?!)	Daisuke Nishio	Takao Koyama	Mitsuo Shindō	Mataji Urata	April 4, 1984
153	3	"A Horrific Game of Tag"; Transliteration: "Kyōfu no onigokko" (Japanese: 恐怖のオニゴッコ)	Hiroki Shibata	Michiru Shimada	Masayuki Uchiyama	Teiichi Akashi	April 11, 1984
154	4	"Straight Ahead! Turbo-kun"; Transliteration: "Chokushin! Tābo-kun" (Japanese: 直進！ターボくん)	Directed by : Kazuhisa Takenouchi; Storyboarded by : Katsumi Endō	Keiji Terui	Yukio Ebisawa	Mataji Urata	April 18, 1984
155	5	"Showdown! US-Japan Baseball Tournament"; Transliteration: "Taiketsu! Nichibei yakyū taikai" (Japanese: 対決！日米やきゆう大会)	Kazuhisa Takenouchi	Keiji Terui	Minoru Maeda	Teiichi Akashi	April 25, 1984
156	6	"US-Japan Baseball Tournament Part II"; Transliteration: "Nichibei yakyū taikai pāto II" (Japanese: 日米やきゅう大会 パートII)	Directed by : Daisuke Nishio; Storyboarded by : Yoshio Mukainakano	Michiru Shimada	Tomoyuki Matsumoto	Mataji Urata	May 2, 1984
157	7	"This is a Dream!!"; Transliteration: "Kore wa yumedesu!!" (Japanese: これは夢です!!)	Minoru Okazaki	Yoshifumi Yuki	Minoru Maeda	Hidenobu Hata	May 9, 1984
158	8	"The Coveted Restaurant"; Transliteration: "Akogare no resutoran" (Japanese: あこがれのレストラン)	Hiroki Shibata	Takao Koyama	Masayuki Uchiyama	Mataji Urata	May 16, 1984
159	9	"Excuse Me, it's Midnight"; Transliteration: "Mayonaka ni gomenkudasai" (Japanese: 真夜中にごめんください)	Daisuke Nishio	Keiji Terui	Mitsuo Shindō	Hidenobu Hata	May 23, 1984
160	10	"The Horror of the Human Fly"; Transliteration: "Kyōfu no hae ningen" (Japanese: 恐怖の ハエ人間)	Directed by : Kazuhisa Takenouchi; Storyboarded by : Yukio Ebisawa	Michiru Shimada	Yukio Ebisawa	Mataji Urata	May 30, 1984
161	11	"N'cha! Great King Enma"; Transliteration: "Ncha! Enma daiō-sama" (Japanese: んちゃ！ エンマ大王さま)	Directed by : Daisuke Nishio; Storyboarded by : Yoshio Mukainakano	Yoshifumi Yuki	Tomoyuki Matsumoto	Hidenobu Hata	June 6, 1984
162	12	"The Christmas Lie"; Transliteration: "Usonko kurisumasu" (Japanese: うそんこクリスマス)	Daisuke Nishio	Takao Koyama	Mitsuo Shindō	Mataji Urata	June 13, 1984
163	13	"Who is the World's Number One!!"; Transliteration: "Sekai hitotsu oino da~re!!" (Japanese: 世界一つおいの だ～れ!!)	Hiroki Shibata	Toshiki Inoue	Masayuki Uchiyama	Hidenobu Hata	June 20, 1984
164	14	"Winner! Winner! The World's Number One!!"; Transliteration: "Yata ~tsu! Yata ~tsu! Sekai ichi!!" (Japanese: やたーっ！やたーっ！世界一!!)	Kazuhisa Takenouchi	Michiru Shimada	Minoru Maeda	Mataji Urata	June 27, 1984
165	15	"Uncle Tiger-Eight's Java Sparrows"; Transliteration: "Tora hachi ojisan no bunchō" (Japanese: とら八おじさんの文鳥)	Kazuhisa Takenouchi	Keiji Terui	Yukio Ebisawa	Mataji Urata	July 4, 1984
166	16	"Gatchan's Identity!!"; Transliteration: "Gatchan no shōtai!!" (Japanese: ガッちゃんの正体!!)	Daisuke Nishio	Yoshifumi Yuki	Mitsuo Shindō	Hidenobu Hata	July 18, 1984
167	17	"God is Very Angry!!"; Transliteration: "Kamisama ōini okoru!!" (Japanese: 神さま大いに怒る!!)	Minoru Okazaki	Takao Koyama	Minoru Maeda	Hidenobu Hata	July 25, 1984
168	18	"Do Your Best, Tanuki-kun!"; Transliteration: "Ganbare tanuki-kun!" (Japanese: がんばれ タヌキくん!)	Hiroki Shibata	Michiru Shimada	Masayuki Uchiyama	Mataji Urata	August 1, 1984
169	19	"It's Been a While Since My Last Great Invention!!"; Transliteration: "Ohisashiburino daihatsumei!!" (Japanese: おひさしぶりの大発明!!)	Directed by : Daisuke Nishio; Storyboarded by : Yoshio Mukainakano	Keiji Terui	Tomoyuki Matsumoto	Hidenobu Hata	August 15, 1984
170	20	"Old Lady Spring's Great Yokai War!"; Transliteration: "Oharusanno youkai daisensou!" (Japanese: おはるさんの妖怪大戦争！)	Kazuhisa Takenouchi	Michiru Shimada	Minoru Maeda	Mataji Urata	August 22, 1984
171	21	"Ruckus of Revenge!"; Transliteration: "Fukushuu no dodonpa!" (Japanese: 復讐のドドンパ！)	Daisuke Nishio	Toshiki Inoue	Mitsuo Shindō	Hidenobu Hata	August 29, 1984
172	22	"Big Laughs on Ghost Island"; Transliteration: "Kyahaha deyuurei shima" (Japanese: キャハハでゆうれい島)	Hiroki Shibata	Yoshifumi Yuki	Masayuki Uchiyama	Teiichi Akashi	September 5, 1984
173	23	"News Reporter Suppaman's Great Exploit"; Transliteration: "Suppamanrepoutaa daisakusen" (Japanese: スッパマンレポーター大作戦)	Minoru Okazaki	Miyako Sugimori	Minoru Maeda	Hidenobu Hata	September 12, 1984
174	24	"The Mysterious Flying Object"; Transliteration: "Nazono hikoubuttai" (Japanese: なぞの飛行物体)	Directed by : Kazuhisa Takenouchi; Storyboarded by : Yukio Ebisawa	Keiji Terui	Yukio Ebisawa	Mataji Urata	September 19, 1984
175	25	"The Adventures of Youth"; Transliteration: "Kake zurimawaru seishun" (Japanese: 駆けずりまわる青春)	Daisuke Nishio	Miyako Sugimori	Tomekichi Takeuchi	Hidenobu Hata	September 26, 1984
176	26	"The Adventures of Youth"; Transliteration: "Kake zurimawaru seishun" (Japanese: 駆けずりまわる青春)	Kazuhisa Takenouchi	Michiru Shimada	Mitsuo Shindō	Hidenobu Hata	October 3, 1984
177	27	"Sorry it's Been Such a Long Time, Niko-chan"; Transliteration: "Gobusata nikochan" (Japanese: ごぶさたニコチャン)	Hiroki Shibata	Keiji Terui	Masayuki Uchiyama	Teiichi Akashi	October 10, 1984
178	28	"Peasuke: Love's Big Adventure"; Transliteration: "Piisuke: ai no daibouken" (Japanese: ピースケ・愛の大冒険)	Minoru Okazaki	Miyako Sugimori	Minoru Maeda	Mataji Urata	October 17, 1984
179	29	"Recklessly Becoming High School Seniors"; Transliteration: "Ukkari koukou sannensei" (Japanese: ウッカリ高校三年生)	Daisuke Nishio	Keiji Terui	Minoru Maeda	Hidenobu Hata	October 24, 1984
180	30	"Arale's Driver License"; Transliteration: "Arare no jidousha menkeshou" (Japanese: アラレの自動車めんけしょー)	Kazuhisa Takenouchi	Miyako Sugimori	Yukio Ebisawa	Mataji Urata & Etsuko Ogasawara	October 31, 1984
181	31	"Faster! Autobike Boy"; Transliteration: "Shissou! outobai kozou" (Japanese: 疾走！オートバイこぞう)	Daisuke Nishio	Toshiki Inoue	Tomekichi Takeuchi	Mataji Urata & Etsuko Ogasawara	November 14, 1984
182	32	"Wagering Love on the Asphalt!"; Transliteration: "Asufaruto ni kake ru koi!" (Japanese: アスファルトに賭ける恋！)	Hiroki Shibata	Yoshifumi Yuki	Masayuki Uchiyama	Teiichi Akashi	November 21, 1984
183	33	"I'm the No. 1 Policeman"; Transliteration: "Aiamu NO.1 porisuman" (Japanese: アイアムNO.1ポリスマン)	Kazuhisa Takenouchi	Takao Koyama	Mitsuo Shindō	Hidenobu Hata	November 28, 1984
184	34	"Arale VS Charmy Yamada"; Transliteration: "Arare VS chaamii yamada" (Japanese: アラレVSチャーミー山田)	Minoru Okazaki	Keiji Terui	Minoru Maeda	Mataji Urata	December 5, 1984
185	35	"Goodbye!! Arale-san"; Transliteration: "Sayonara!! arare san" (Japanese: さようなら!!アラレさん)	Daisuke Nishio	Michiru Shimada	Minoru Maeda	Hidenobu Hata	December 12, 1984
186	36	"A Star has Arrived!!"; Transliteration: "Sutaa sangayattekita!!" (Japanese: スターさんがやってきた!!)	Kazuhisa Takenouchi	Michiru Shimada	Yukio Ebisawa	Mataji Urata	December 19, 1984
187	37	"Even Better! Superman Suppaman"; Transliteration: "Mitaka! choujin suppaman" (Japanese: みたか！超人スッパマン)	Hiroki Shibata	Keiji Terui	Masayuki Uchiyama	Hidenobu Hata	January 9, 1985
188	38	"Vault of the Legendary Pumpkin"; Transliteration: "Dote kabocha no densetsu" (Japanese: どてカボチャの伝説)	Daisuke Nishio	Toshiki Inoue	Tomekichi Takeuchi	Teiichi Akashi	January 16, 1985
189	39	"Oh! My Safe-chan"; Transliteration: "Ou! mai kinkochan" (Japanese: オー！マイきんこちゃん)	Minoru Okazaki	Miyako Sugimori	Minoru Maeda	Hidenobu Hata	January 23, 1985
190	40	"I Did It! The One Million Yen Quiz"; Transliteration: "Yatta! kuizu de 100 man en" (Japanese: やった！クイズで100万えん)	Daisuke Nishio	Keiji Terui	Minoru Maeda	Hidenobu Hata	January 30, 1985
191	41	"Penguin Village Murder Mystery"; Transliteration: "Pengin mura renzokusatsujinjiken" (Japanese: ペンギン村連続殺人事件)	Kazuhisa Takenouchi	Miyako Sugimori & Yoshifumi Yuki	Masayuki Uchiyama	Teiichi Akashi	February 6, 1985
192	42	"Dreaming of the Penguin Village Grand Prix"; Transliteration: "Yume no pengin mura guranpuri" (Japanese: 夢のペンギン村グランプリ)	Kazuhisa Takenouchi	Miyako Sugimori	Mitsuo Shindō	Hidenobu Hata	February 13, 1985
193	43	"Run! Hurry! Move Quickly!!"; Transliteration: "Hashire! tobase! tsuppashire!!" (Japanese: 走れ！とばせ！つっぱしれ!!)	Directed by : Yutaka Satō; Storyboarded by : Yukio Ebisawa	Keiji Terui	Yukio Ebisawa	Hidenobu Hata	February 20, 1985
194	44	"It's Been Decided! Penguin Village's New Mayor"; Transliteration: "Kettei! pengin mura no niimura chou" (Japanese: 決定！ペンギン村の新村長)	Minoru Okazaki	Toshiki Inoue	Minoru Maeda	Mataji Urata	February 27, 1985
195	45	"Verifying Love in Our Future"; Transliteration: "Ai ha mirai detashikamete" (Japanese: 愛は未来でたしかめて)	Kazuhisa Takenouchi	Michiru Shimada	Mitsuo Shindō	Hidenobu Hata	March 6, 1985
196	46	"Let's Check Out 10 Years From Now Once More"; Transliteration: "Mouichido 10 nengo" (Japanese: もういちど10年後)	Daisuke Nishio	Keiji Terui	Tomekichi Takeuchi	Mataji Urata	March 13, 1985
197	47	"Arale: Super Pianist"; Transliteration: "Arare nosuupaa pianisuto" (Japanese: アラレのすぅぱーピアニスト)	Hiroki Shibata	Michiru Shimada	Minoru Maeda	Teiichi Akashi	March 20, 1985

=== Season 5 (1985-86) ===
No. overall	No. in season	Title	Directed by	Written by	Animation directed by	Art directed by	Original release date
198	1	"Secret Intelligence Bureau"; Transliteration: "Himitsu jouhou kyoku" (Japanese: ひみつ情報きょく)	Kazuhisa Takenouchi	Keiji Terui	Masayuki Uchiyama	Mataji Urata	March 27, 1985
199	2	"Secret Intelligence Bureau"; Transliteration: "Himitsu jouhou kyoku" (Japanese: ひみつ情報きょく)	Daisuke Nishio	Keiji Terui	Mitsuo Shindō	Hidenobu Hata	April 3, 1985
200	3	"It's Been a Long Time! Akiko-san Returns"; Transliteration: "Hisashiburi! kaette kita akiko san" (Japanese: ひさしぶり！帰ってきたアキコさん)	Minoru Okazaki	Miyako Sugimori	Minoru Maeda	Teiichi Akashi	April 10, 1985
201	4	"Arale's Japanese Folk Tales"; Transliteration: "Arare no nihonmukashi banashi" (Japanese: アラレの日本昔ばなし)	Directed by : Yutaka Satō; Storyboarded by : Yukio Ebisawa	Takao Koyama	Yukio Ebisawa	Mataji Urata	April 17, 1985
202	5	"Everyone and Everyone's Friends"; Transliteration: "Minnaminnao tomo dachi" (Japanese: みんなみんなお友だち)	Hiroki Shibata	Miyako Sugimori	Tomekichi Takeuchi	Hidenobu Hata	April 24, 1985
203	6	"A Secret Mission of First Love"; Transliteration: "Hatsukoi himitsu shirei" (Japanese: はつこい秘密司令)	Kazuhisa Takenouchi	Keiji Terui	Masayuki Uchiyama	Teiichi Akashi	May 1, 1985
204	7	"Silly Love Panic"; Transliteration: "Hachamecha rabupanikku" (Japanese: はちゃめちゃラブパニック)	Daisuke Nishio	Toshiki Inoue	Minoru Maeda	Mataji Urata	May 8, 1985
205	8	"Nekomimi-san's Happiness"; Transliteration: "Shiawaseno nekomimi san" (Japanese: しあわせのネコミミさん)	Hiroki Shibata	Michiru Shimada	Mitsuo Shindō	Hidenobu Hata	May 15, 1985
206	9	"Collision! Comet Alley"; Transliteration: "Gekitotsu! are sui hoshi" (Japanese: 激突！アレーすい星)	Minoru Okazaki	Yasushi Hirano	Minoru Maeda	Teiichi Akashi	May 22, 1985
207	10	"Fear of Being Unsophisticated"; Transliteration: "Kyoufu noojouhin gokko" (Japanese: 恐怖のおじょうひんゴッコ)	Daisuke Nishio	Miho Maruo	Yukio Ebisawa	Mataji Urata	May 29, 1985
208	11	"Komatta-chan Strikes Back"; Transliteration: "Komattachan no gyakushuu" (Japanese: コマッタチャンの逆襲)	Kazuhisa Takenouchi	Keiji Terui	Masayuki Uchiyama	Hidenobu Hata	June 5, 1985
209	12	"Arale-san! Marry Me"; Transliteration: "Arare san! kekkon shite kudasai" (Japanese: アラレさん！結婚して下さい)	Hiroki Shibata	Yasushi Hirano	Tomekichi Takeuchi	Teiichi Akashi	June 12, 1985
210	13	"Senbei: Senbei"; Transliteration: "Senbee . senbee" (Japanese: センベエ・センベエ)	Kazuhisa Takenouchi	Miyako Sugimori	Mitsuo Shindō	Mataji Urata	June 19, 1985
211	14	"Fight!! Kin'enman"; Transliteration: "Tatakae!! kin'enman" (Japanese: 戦え!!キンエンマン)	Daisuke Nishio	Keiji Terui	Minoru Maeda	Hidenobu Hata	June 26, 1985
212	15	"Making Peace with Cupid Robo"; Transliteration: "Nakanaori kyuupiddorobo" (Japanese: なかなおりキューピッドロボ)	Minoru Okazaki	Miho Maruo	Minoru Maeda	Teiichi Akashi	July 3, 1985
213	16	"Dr. Brain's Great Hoyoyo Battle"; Transliteration: "Dokutaa nou hoyoyo daisakusen" (Japanese: ドクター脳ほよよ大作戦)	Kazuhisa Takenouchi	Hajime Suzuki	Masayuki Uchiyama	Hidenobu Hata	July 10, 1985
214	17	"Thanks! Suppaman"; Transliteration: "Arigatou! suppaman" (Japanese: ありがとう！スッパマン)	Daisuke Nishio	Takao Koyama	Mitsuo Shindō	Teiichi Akashi	July 17, 1985
215	18	"Silent Love"; Transliteration: "Sairento . rabu" (Japanese: サイレント・ラブ)	Hiroki Shibata	Hiroki Shibata	Tomekichi Takeuchi	Hidenobu Hata	July 24, 1985
216	19	"The Mayor's Coming!"; Transliteration: "Chouchou sanga kuru yo!" (Japanese: 町長さんが来るよ！)	Daisuke Nishio	Miho Maruo	Minoru Maeda	Mataji Urata	July 31, 1985
217	20	"Lullaby of Suppaman"; Transliteration: "Suppaman no komoriuta" (Japanese: スッパマンの子守歌)	Kazuhisa Takenouchi	Toshiki Inoue	Yukio Ebisawa	Hidenobu Hata	August 7, 1985
218	21	"The Miracle Grilled Fish Meal"; Transliteration: "Kisekino yakizakana teishoku" (Japanese: きせきの焼き魚定食)	Minoru Okazaki	Keiji Terui	Minoru Maeda	Mataji Urata	August 14, 1985
219	22	"Invitation to Another Dimension"; Transliteration: "Ijigen henogo shoutai" (Japanese: 異次元へのご招待)	Kazuhisa Takenouchi	Hajime Suzuki	Masayuki Uchiyama	Hidenobu Hata	August 21, 1985
220	23	"The Thunder God Falls to Earth"; Transliteration: "Kaminari samaga ochiru nichi" (Japanese: カミナリさまが落ちる日)	Daisuke Nishio	Yasushi Hirano	Mitsuo Shindō	Mataji Urata	August 28, 1985
221	24	"Sparta Wars"; Transliteration: "suparuta . uo zu" (Japanese: スパルタ・ウォーズ)	Hiroki Shibata	Michiru Shimada	Tomekichi Takeuchi	Hidenobu Hata	September 4, 1985
222	25	"Go for it! Mr. Pro Wrestler"; Transliteration: "Ganbaretsu! puroresuraa san" (Japanese: がんばれっ！プロレスラーさん)	Daisuke Nishio	Keiji Terui	Minoru Maeda	Mataji Urata	September 11, 1985
223	26	"Has the Sun Run Away from Home!?"; Transliteration: "Taiyou san iede shichitta!?" (Japanese: 太陽さん家出しちった!?)	Minoru Okazaki	Miho Maruo	Minoru Maeda	Hidenobu Hata	September 18, 1985
224	27	"Exciting Tea Room"; Transliteration: "Tokimeki teiiruumu" (Japanese: ときめきティールーム)	Directed by : Kazuhisa Takenouchi; Storyboarded by : Yukio Ebisawa	Keiji Terui	Yukio Ebisawa	Mataji Urata	September 25, 1985
225	28	"We Don't Need these Cats!!"; Transliteration: "Neko san'irankanee!!" (Japanese: ネコさんいらんかねぇ!!)	Kazuhisa Takenouchi	Toshiki Inoue	Masayuki Uchiyama	Hidenobu Hata	October 2, 1985
226	29	"Dream Machine of Terror"; Transliteration: "Kyoufu no doriimu . mashin" (Japanese: 恐怖のドリーム・マシン)	Yutaka Satō	Takao Koyama	Mitsuo Shindō	Mataji Urata	October 9, 1985
227	30	"Arale VS Metropolis Island Bullies"; Transliteration: "Arare VS tokai shima noijimetsu ko" (Japanese: アラレVS都会島のいじめっコ)	Daisuke Nishio	Keiji Terui	Tomekichi Takeuchi	Hidenobu Hata	October 16, 1985
228	31	"Disruptive Toys"; Transliteration: "Omocha nonchacha" (Japanese: オモチャのんちゃちゃ)	Minoru Okazaki	Yasushi Hirano	Minoru Maeda	Mataji Urata	October 23, 1985
229	32	"Arale's Airport '85"; Transliteration: "Arare no eapōto '85" (Japanese: アラレのエアポート'85)	Daisuke Nishio	Hajime Suzuki	Minoru Maeda	Hidenobu Hata	October 30, 1985
230	33	"Arale's Food Substitution Battle"; Transliteration: "Arare no kaedama daisakusen" (Japanese: アラレの替え玉大作戦)	Kazuhisa Takenouchi	Keiji Terui	Masayuki Uchiyama	Mataji Urata	November 6, 1985
231	34	"Yay! Fairy Tale Land!!"; Transliteration: "Waa i! meruhenrando!!" (Japanese: わーい！メルヘンランド!!)	Directed by : Kazuhisa Takenouchi; Storyboarded by : Yukio Ebisawa	Michiru Shimada	Yukio Ebisawa	Hidenobu Hata	November 20, 1985
232	35	"The Norimaki's Quiet Evening"; Transliteration: "Norimaki shi no shizuka naru tsuitachi" (Japanese: ノリマキ氏の静かなる一日)	Yutaka Satō	Miyako Sugimori	Mitsuo Shindō	Mataji Urata	November 27, 1985
233	36	"Revealed!! Earth's Secret"; Transliteration: "Bareta!! chikyuu nohimitsu" (Japanese: バレタ!!地球のひみつ)	Daisuke Nishio	Yasushi Hirano	Tomekichi Takeuchi	Hidenobu Hata	December 4, 1985
234	37	"Hoyoyo!! Earth Falls Apart"; Transliteration: "Hoyoyo!! chikyuu barabara" (Japanese: ほよよ!!地球バラバラ)	Minoru Okazaki	Yasushi Hirano	Minoru Maeda	Mataji Urata	December 11, 1985
235	38	"An Important Announcement!!"; Transliteration: "Juudai happyoushimaa su!!" (Japanese: 重大はっぴょうしまーす!!)	Daisuke Nishio	Miho Maruo	Minoru Maeda	Mataji Urata	December 18, 1985
236	39	"The Horror of Black Santa!!"; Transliteration: "Kyoufu no burakku . santa!!" (Japanese: 恐怖のブラック・サンタ!!)	Kazuhisa Takenouchi	Michiru Shimada	Masayuki Uchiyama	Hidenobu Hata	December 25, 1985
237	40	"Audition Day!! We're All Set"; Transliteration: "Oudeishon dayo!! zen'inshuugou" (Japanese: オーディションだよ!!全員集合)	Directed by : Yutaka Satō; Storyboarded by : Yukio Ebisawa	Keiji Terui	Yukio Ebisawa	Hidenobu Hata	January 8, 1986
238	41	"Clash! Main Character Title Match"; Transliteration: "Gekitotsu!! shuyaku taitorumacchi" (Japanese: 激突!!主役タイトルマッチ)	Kazuhisa Takenouchi	Toshiki Inoue	Mitsuo Shindō	Mataji Urata	January 15, 1986
239	42	"The Girlfriend Who Fell From the Sky"; Transliteration: "Sora tobu garu . furendo" (Japanese: 空とぶガール・フレンド)	Daisuke Nishio	Takao Koyama	Tomekichi Takeuchi	Hidenobu Hata	January 22, 1986
240	43	"Goodbye Arale-chan as Penguin Village Disappears"; Transliteration: "Sayonara arare chan kie ta pengin mura" (Japanese: さよならアラレちゃん 消えたペンギン村)	Kazuhisa Takenouchi	Yasushi Hirano	Masayuki Uchiyama	Mataji Urata	January 29, 1986
241	44	"Goodbye Arale-chan Who Loved Making Friends"; Transliteration: "Sayonara arare chan mishira nu arare no koibito" (Japanese: さよならアラレちゃん 見知らぬアラレの恋人)	Yutaka Satō	Keiji Terui	Yukio Ebisawa	Hidenobu Hata	February 5, 1986
242	45	"Goodbye Arale-chan with Dread! The Exciting Bargain Sale"; Transliteration: "Sayonara arare chan kyoufu ! dokidoki bagenseuru" (Japanese: さよならアラレちゃん 恐怖！どきどきバーゲンセール)	Directed by : Yoshihiro Ueda; Storyboarded by : Katsumi Endō	Shun'ichi Yukimuro	Minoru Maeda	Hidenobu Hata	February 12, 1986
243	46	"Goodbye Arale-chan Bye-cha! See Ya Later!!"; Transliteration: "Sayonara arare chan baicha! mataneii!!" (Japanese: さよならアラレちゃん バイチャ！またねー!!)	Kazuhisa Takenouchi	Michiru Shimada	Mitsuo Shindō	Mataji Urata	February 19, 1986

=== Educational Films and Specials (1983-2007) ===
No.	Title	Directed by	Written by	Animation directed by	Art directed by	Original release date
ED1	"Dr. Slump: Arale-chan's Traffic Safety"; Transliteration: "Dr. Suranpu arale-chan no Kōtsū anzen" (Japanese: Dr.スランプ アラレちゃんの交通安全)	Toyoo Ashida	Toshiki Inoue	Toyoo Ashida	Teiichi Akashi	1983
ED2	"Let's Learn Traffic Safety"; Transliteration: "kōtsū rūru o mamorou yo" (Japanese: 交通ルールをまもろうよ)	Minoru Okazaki	Toshiki Inoue	Minoru Maeda	Mataji Urata	1983
ED3	"The Penguin Village Fire Brigade"; Transliteration: "Pengin-mura no shōbō-tai" (Japanese: ペンギン村の消防隊)	Shigeo Koshi	Toshiki Inoue	Sadayoshi Tominaga	Jun'ichi Higashi	1984
SP5	"Dr. Slump and Arale-chan Returns Special"; Transliteration: "Kaette kita Dr. Suranpu arare-chan supesharu" (Japanese: 帰って来たDr.スランプ アラレちゃんスペシャル)	Minoru Okazaki	-	Minoru Maeda	-	December 31, 1990
SP6	"Dr. Slump: Arale-chan '92 New Year Special"; Transliteration: "Dr. Suranpu arare-chan '92 oshōgatsu supesharu" (Japanese: Dr.スランプ・アラレちゃん '92お正月スペシャル)	Directed by : Kazuhisa Takenouchi, Minoru Okazaki, Akinori Nagaoka, Yūji Katō & Daisuke Nishio; Storyboarded by : Kōsei Maeda, Hiromitsu Morita, Katsumi Endō & Yukio Ebisawa	Masaki Tsuji, Shun'ichi Yukimuro, Toshiki Inoue, Michiru Shimada & Takao Koyama	Minoru Maeda, Rie Nishiyama, Toshiki Hirano, Mitsuo Shindō, Sadayoshi Tominaga, Yukio Ebisawa & Masayuki Uchiyama	Mataji Urata, Teiichi Akashi, Yûji Ikeda, Hidenobu Hata & Isamu Tsuchida	January 1, 1992
SP6	"Dr. Slump: Arale-chan '92 New Year Special"; Transliteration: "Dr. Suranpu arare-chan '92 oshōgatsu supesharu" (Japanese: Dr.スランプ・アラレちゃん '92お正月スペシャル)	Directed by : Kazuhisa Takenouchi, Minoru Okazaki, Akinori Nagaoka, Yūji Katō & Daisuke Nishio; Storyboarded by : Kōsei Maeda, Hiromitsu Morita, Katsumi Endō & Yukio Ebisawa	Masaki Tsuji, Shun'ichi Yukimuro, Toshiki Inoue, Michiru Shimada & Takao Koyama	Minoru Maeda, Rie Nishiyama, Toshiki Hirano, Mitsuo Shindō, Sadayoshi Tominaga, Yukio Ebisawa & Masayuki Uchiyama	Mataji Urata, Teiichi Akashi, Yûji Ikeda, Hidenobu Hata & Isamu Tsuchida	January 2, 1992
SP6	"Dr. Slump: Arale-chan '92 New Year Special"; Transliteration: "Dr. Suranpu arare-chan '92 oshōgatsu supesharu" (Japanese: Dr.スランプ・アラレちゃん '92お正月スペシャル)	Directed by : Kazuhisa Takenouchi, Minoru Okazaki, Akinori Nagaoka, Yūji Katō & Daisuke Nishio; Storyboarded by : Kōsei Maeda, Hiromitsu Morita, Katsumi Endō & Yukio Ebisawa	Masaki Tsuji, Shun'ichi Yukimuro, Toshiki Inoue, Michiru Shimada & Takao Koyama	Minoru Maeda, Rie Nishiyama, Toshiki Hirano, Mitsuo Shindō, Sadayoshi Tominaga, Yukio Ebisawa & Masayuki Uchiyama	Mataji Urata, Teiichi Akashi, Yûji Ikeda, Hidenobu Hata & Isamu Tsuchida	January 3, 1992

#	Title	Original air date
SP	"Dr. Slump and Arale-chan Special: Ooh-ho-hoy! - I Came Back to Win"; Transliteration: "Dr. Suranpu arare-chan SP 〜 u hoho 〜 i! Kaette ki chitta no maki 〜" (Japanese: Dr.スランプアラレちゃんSP 〜うほほ〜い!帰ってきちったの巻〜)	June 29, 2007
Fuji TV commemorated the release of the series on DVD with this special hosted by Mami Koyama and Toshiyuki Makihara.
