= Azuki-chan =

Japanese manga series

- Cover of Azuki-chan volume as published by Kodansha

あずきちゃん
- Manga
- Written by: Yasushi Akimoto
- Illustrated by: Chika Kimura
- Published by: Kodansha
- Magazine: Nakayoshi
- Original run: 1992 – 1997
- Volumes: 5
- Anime television series
- Directed by: Masayuki Kojima
- Produced by: Eizo Kondo; Satoshi Yoshimoto (animation producer)
- Written by: Shun'ichi Yukimuro; Tatsuhiko Urahata; Chie Wakaki
- Music by: Yo Tsuji
- Studio: Madhouse
- Original network: NHK
- Original run: April 4, 1995 – March 17, 1998
- Episodes: 117
- Anime film
- Directed by: Masayuki Kojima
- Licensed by: NHK Enterprises 21
- Released: December 23, 1995
- Runtime: 30 minutes

Azuki-chan (Japanese: あずきちゃん) is a Japanese manga series written by Yasushi Akimoto and illustrated by Chika Kimura. It was serialized in Kodansha's shōjo manga magazine Nakayoshi from 1992 to 1997. It is about a young schoolgirl named Azusa Nogami, nicknamed Azuki-chan because when she was in first grade, Ken Takayanagi, a boy in her class, accidentally read her name, "Azusa(あずさ)", as "Azuki(あずき)".

== Plot summary ==
Azusa Noyama (野山 梓 Noyama Azusa) always hated her nickname, Azuki (小豆ちゃん Azuki-chan).

She hates it until one day a new boy, Yūnosuke Ogasawara (小笠原 勇之助 Ogasawara Yūnosuke), starts in the same class as her on the first day of fifth grade. Earlier that day, Azuki is teased by Ken Takayanagi (高柳 健 Takayanagi Ken), or Ken-chan, about her nickname. Yūnosuke passes by and happily memorizes the name becoming the first girl he notices. Azuki is overjoyed, and instantly falls in love with him, loving both him and her nickname. However, Azuki gets jealous when she sees him closer to other girls.

Azuki lives with her mother, Keiko (けい子), with her father, Tadashi (正), and with her little brother, Daizu (大豆) in an apartment. Azuki has three best friends, Kaoru Nishino (西野 薫 Nishino Kaoru), Midori Kodama (兒玉 持玉 翠 Kodama Jidama Midori) and Tomomi Takahashi (高橋 朋美 Takahashi Tomomi).

Kaoru has blonde hair, and she's calm and sensitive so she often cries. She lives with her mom, who owns a salon, near from Azuki's apartment. Kaoru secretly crushes on Ken but he doesn't accept her because he likes Azuki. Although in that situation, Kaoru still thinks Azuki is her best friend. Later, Ken starts to open up to Kaoru and gets closer to her.

Midori Kodama is a tomboy and her close friends call her "Jidama". She lives with her grandmother. They seem to have a very close relationship except one episode when Jidama have gone out and sneaked in Azuki's bedroom because of an argument with her grandmother. She doesn't have a crush on anyone but in an episode, she falls for a police officer who helped her when her house was robbed. However, Jidama stops crushing on him when she realizes that the police officer is already married.

Tomomi, whom her friends called her "Tomo-chan" or "Tomo" is the class president. She wears glasses and has her hair in a black bob. She really likes Makoto Sakaguchi (坂口 誠 Sakaguchi Makoto), a close friend of Yūnosuke. Makoto didn't notice her at first but at last he asks her to go on a date in his parents' hotel, and eventually gets closer with Tomo.

Makoto is a rich boy but is not one of the spoiled brats. He is kind of sleepy and was intelligent "until 3rd grade". He's one of Yūnosuke's best friends, and they really are close.

Not only Azuki has a crush on Yūnosuke, but apparently most girls in her class also have feelings about him.

One of them is Yōko Sakakibara, a rich girl whose mom is a friend of Yūnosuke's. Yōko thinks she will get Yūnosuke as her boyfriend and tries to separate him with Azuki.

Ken "Ken-chan" Takayanagi is also a best friend of Yūnosuke. He's also a childhood friend of Azuki. Ken's father owns a ramen stall near Azuki's apartment, so Azuki always orders ramen from Ken's stall. Ken's mother doesn't appear a lot in the episodes.

In the second season, there was a new music teacher that Azuki is jealous of because she seems close to Yūnosuke. However, Azuki gets over it soon.

Before, in the first season, Azuki and Yūnosuke have their first kiss after he was beaten up by some middle school students. The funny part is that Yūnosuke thinks that Azuki will have a baby for that. Later, he finds out that this isn't true.

Also, in one episode, a sixth-grader crushes on Azuki and follows her wherever she goes. When they were little, Azuki helped him find his ball. Finally, he stopped wanting Azuki's response.

Daizu, Azuki's younger brother, also gets his own story. He has a girlfriend who falls for Yūnosuke but then gets back to him because realizing that Yūnosuke is already with Azuki. Before her, Daizu fell in love with Yōko...but he completely forgets her.

Azuki, Kaoru, and Tomo makes a club called "Club of Unreturned Love/ One-Sided Love" in one of the first episodes.

Makoto's older sister, which it's hard to believe she's his sister, appeared in a few episodes.
