= The Adventures of Pepero =

Japanese anime television series

- Cover of EP showing two main characters.
- Genre: Adventure
- Created by: Tatsuya Ono; Sumio Takahashi
- Written by: Masaki Tsuji; Shigeharu Harajima; Yū Yamamoto; Shun'ichi Yukimuro; Tadashi Minagai; Izumi Arima; Yūji Mino; Naoko Miyake; Sōji Yoshikawa; Keiji Kubota
- Directed by: Kazuhiko Udagawa
- Country of origin: Japan
- Original language: Japanese
- No. of episodes: 26

Production
- Production companies: Daiko; Wako Production

Original release
- Network: ANN (NET)
- Release: 6 October 1975 – 29 March 1976

The Adventures of Pepero or The Adventures of Pepero the Andes Boy (アンデス少年ペペロの冒険, Andesu Shōnen Pepero no Bōken) is a 26-episode anime television series created by Tatsuya Ono and Sumio Takahashi and aired on the NET Network from 1975-10-06 to 1976-03-29 in Japan. It has since been then translated and broadcast in several languages worldwide. The story follows the young boy Pepero as he searches for his father who has gone missing while seeking the mythical golden city of El Dorado.

The theme songs for the series are Pepero's Adventure (ペペロの冒険, Pepero no Bōken) (opening) and O Wind, Please Carry My Message (風よつたえて, Kaze yo Tsutaete) (ending), both composed by Takeo Yamashita and arranged by Hiroshi Tsutsui, with lyrics by Kazuo Umezu and vocals by Mitsuko Horie.

== Plot ==
The story starts with Pepero, a young boy in a small poor village in the Andes who lives with his mother in their small house in the village. Pepero's father had left the village earlier in search of the mythical El Dorado, a city that is said to be built completely out of gold which no one has ever found. Pepero's father's aim is to put his family and village out of poverty. However, the father is away for a very long time and no one heard anything about him since he left. The story starts with Pepero seeing the reflection of a golden condor in a river when he was filling some pots with water. Pepero considers that a sign that his father is alive and that he should look for him. His mind is made up when he meets two weary travelers, an old man named Titicaca and an amnesiac girl named Kayna, who apparently had heard of the mythical El Dorado. Pepero's mind is made up and he decides to set off on the quest for El Dorado with Titicaca and Kayna agreeing to come along with him. On the way, he picks up more friends like Aztec, a teenager who has to look after his siblings while his mother is sick and who sometimes resorts to stealing to support his family and agrees to tag along in promise of the lost treasures, and Chuchu, who is a small boy performing in a circus and who has to look after his sister. In one episode, Pepero succeeds in taming a wild white horse and the horse repays him by coming to Pepero's rescue whenever the latter whistles. Pepero also wears a unique necklace in the shape of a white horn which is the same as the one worn by his father. This helps people identify him as the son of Carlos. This fact is uncovered when Pepero meets a guy who claims that he is Carlos and who is wearing the same necklace. At the end of the episode we discover that Carlos actually saved this man and gave him his necklace.

The golden condor also makes an appearance once in a while to guide Pepero in the general direction he has to take in order to reach El Dorado. Pepero also encounters such sinister characters as a swindler who convinces people that he alone can prevent the wrath of a mountain god in return for money from the natives and a girl who tries to kill them off in a maze among others. At one point in the story and while trying to traverse a cave to the other side, Titicaca gets trapped after a cave-in and the rest of the troop have to travel without him. The gang have to use their heads in order to pass through a maze and later on to solve another puzzle in order to get the map to El Dorado. This rough map in addition to another they acquire from a jealous princess leads them to the gates of El Dorado where Pepero discovers that his father is being accused of stealing the imperial jewels. Pepero in the nick of time discovers that his father is being framed by the head of the police and ends up proving his father's innocence and exposing the cheating official. The whole gang is later taken to meet the emperor and his family and there it is that he discovers that Kayna is actually the princess and that she had lost her memory when a group of conspirators tried to kill her off. The group is still there and try to repeat their act again but Pepero finds out and saves her. An engagement ceremony is held for Pepero and Kayna and the whole gang returns to their respective homes while Pepero and his father, loaded with cash, return to their village to spread the wealth among the poor residents.

The show holds a great fascination especially for the young viewers since it has all the elements that excite such an audience like lost treasures, clues that have to be solved, maps...etc. It also presents a wide array of interesting people who the gang meet and present them with moral and ethical problems that they have to cope with while looking for their way along the Andes.

== Staff ==
- Series Director: Kazuhiko Udagawa
- Episode Directors: Takashi Annō, Yasuo Hasegawa, Yoshiyuki Tomino, Kazushi Nomura, Kazuhiko Udagawa, Masaru Katō, Motosuke Takahashi
- Planning: Toshitaka Yokochi, Shōichi Kitamura
- Series Organization: Yoshio Umezu, Mitsuo Satō
- Original Development: Tatsuya Ono, Sumio Takahashi
- Teleplays:
  - Shigeharu Harajima (ep.1, 12, 14)
  - Sōji Yoshikawa (ep.2, 9, 19)
  - Naoko Miyake (ep.3, 5)
  - Yū Yamamoto (ep.4, 6, 15)
  - Masaki Tsuji (ep.7, 10-11, 16, 21)
  - Shun'ichi Yukimuro (ep.8, 13, 23)
  - Tadashi Minagai (ep.12, 14-15)
  - Izumi Arima (ep.17, 22, 25)
  - Yūji Mino (ep.18, 20, 26)
  - Keiji Kubota (ep.24)
- Music: Takeo Yamashita
- Character Designs: Nobuhiro Okasako, Moriyasu Taniguchi
- Animation Director: Nobuhiro Okasako
- Production: Wako Pro

== Cast ==
- Pepero: Hiroko Suzuki
- Anita: Mariko Taki
- Aztec: Mie Azuma
- Carlos: Nobuo Tanaka
- Chutchu: Rie Miura
- Titicaca: Toshiya Ueda
- Kayna: Yoshiko Matsuo
- Narrator: Wakako Ikeda (ep.1-5)
- Narrator: Mariko Taki (ep.6-26)

== Media ==
- The Adventures of Pepero EP Kaze yo Tsutaete, SCS-273, Nihon Columbia Records, October 1975
- DVD box set, 2004-02-27, Dream Eggs, 8 discs
