= Albert Dawson =

Albert Dawson may refer to:

- Albert F. Dawson (1872–1949), Republican U.S. Representative from Iowa
- Albert K. Dawson (1885–1967), American photojournalist
