= Michiko Kuwano =

Japanese actress (1915–1946)

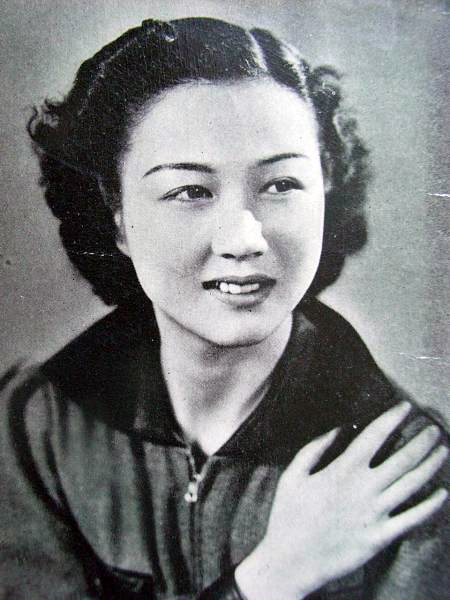
- Born: 4 January 1915; Shiba, Tokyo, Japan
- Died: 1 April 1946 (aged 31)
- Occupation: Actress
- Years active: 1934–1946

Michiko Kuwano (桑野通子, Kuwano Michiko; 4 January 1915 – 1 April 1946) was a Japanese film actress.

== Biography ==
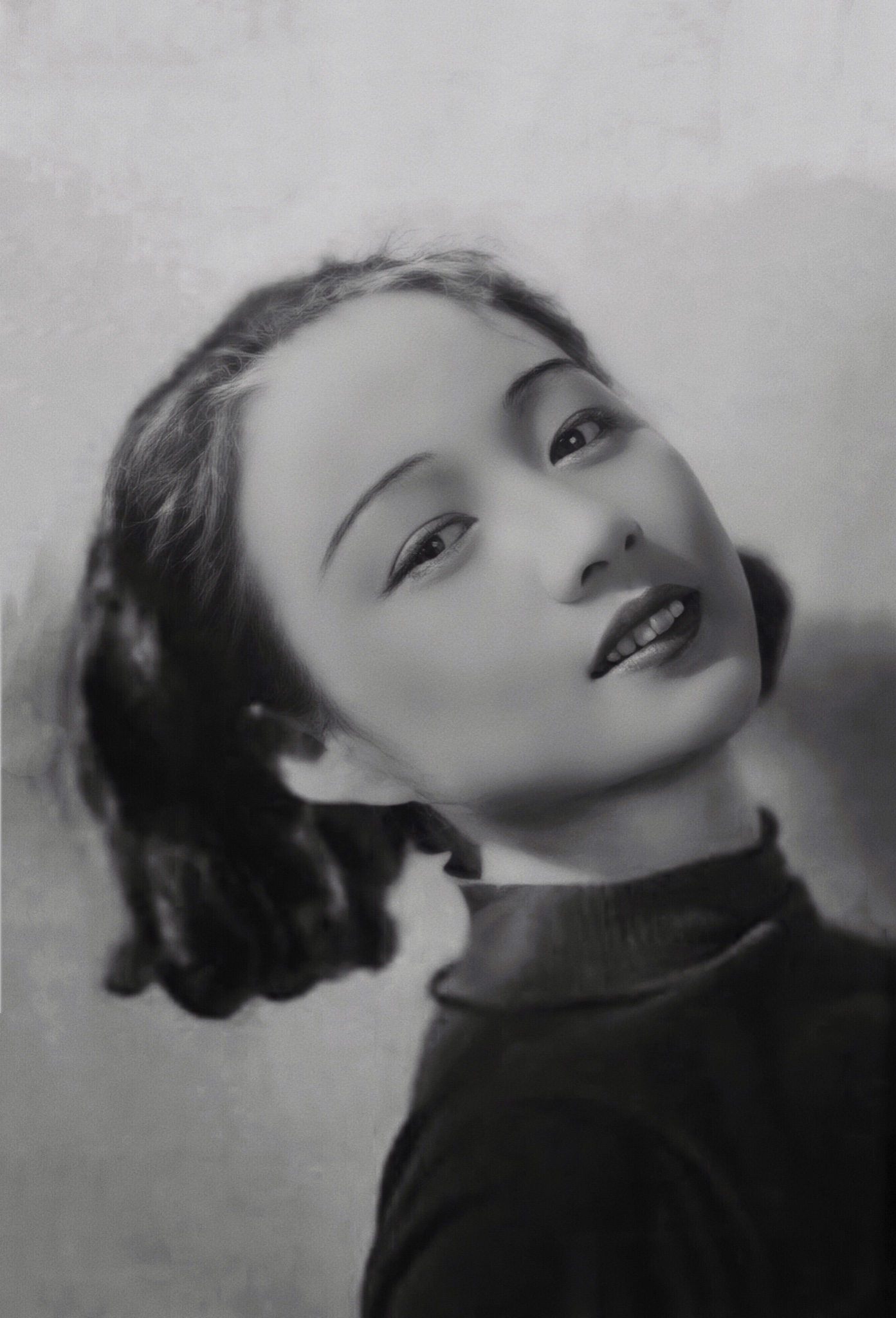
Michiko Kuwano in 1936.

Michiko Kuwano was born on January 4, 1915 in the former municipality of Shiba ward, which is now located in the Minato ward in Tokyo. Her father was a chef, and her mother died when she was four years old. After graduating from Mita High School in 1932, she first worked as a "sweets girl" for Morinaga & Company before entering the Shochiku film studios in 1934. She gave birth in 1942 to Miyuki Kuwano, who would later become an actress.

She fainted during the filming of Victory of Women by Kenji Mizoguchi and died on April 1, 1946 from complications of a hemorrhage due to an ectopic pregnancy at the age of 31.

== Career ==
She made her film debut in Hiroshi Shimizu's Eclipse. She would go on to make several films with Shimizu, including Mr. Thank You. Michiko Kuwano appeared in nearly 90 films for Shōchiku between 1934 and 1946. In addition to many films directed by Shimizu, she starred in films by Yasujirō Ozu and Yasujirō Shimazu. In 1946, she collapsed on the set of Kenji Mizoguchi's Victory of Women.

== Selected filmography ==
- 1934: Eclipse
- 1936: Mr. Thank You
- 1937: What Did the Lady Forget?
- 1939: A Brother and His Younger Sister
- 1940: The Legend of Tank Commander Nishizumi
- 1942: Brothers and Sisters of the Toda Family
- 1946: Victory of Women
