= Eclipse (1934 film) =

1934 Japanese film

- Film poster

Japanese name
- Kanji: 金環蝕
- Directed by: Hiroshi Shimizu
- Written by: Masao Arata; Masao Kume (novel)
- Starring: Mitsugu Fujii; Hiroko Kawasaki; Michiko Kuwano
- Cinematography: Tarō Sasaki
- Music by: Yoshi Eguchi
- Production company: Shochiku
- Distributed by: Shochiku
- Release date: 1934 (Japan); (Note: The Japanese Movie Database and Kinenote give different release dates for the film, 1 November 1934 or 28 September 1934, respectively.)
- Running time: 97 minutes
- Country: Japan
- Language: Silent (with Japanese intertitles)

Eclipse (Japanese: 金環蝕, Hepburn: Kinkanshoku; lit. "Annular Eclipse") is a 1934 Japanese silent romance film directed by Hiroshi Shimizu. It is based on the novel Kinkanshoku by Masao Kume and one of the few extant silent films by the director.

== Plot ==
Ōsaki and Kanda return to their rural hometown after graduating from university. As Kanda has reached the age to marry and, having graduated in law, is considered an eligible match, he chooses Ōsaki's cousin Kinue, whom he has long been interested in, as a future wife. Ōsaki acts as a go-between for Kanda, but Kinue is indignant as it had always been Ōsaki whom she loved. Ōsaki leaves for Tokyo in hope for better job prospects, leaving behind a disappointed and embittered Kinue.

After repeated attempts, Ōsaki finds a position as a private teacher for the young son of wealthy businessman Iwaki. House maid Kayo, sister of Iwaki's chauffeur Matsumura, develops an affection for Ōsaki, but is pushed aside by Iwaki's boisterous daughter Tomone. During a surprise visit by Kanda, who once served as a tutor for Tomone, Ōsaki learns that Kinue, instead of marrying Kanda, left for Tokyo soon after Ōsaki's departure. When Ōsaki, Kanda and Tomone date, Tomone secretly tells Ōsaki that she would rather have met him alone.

After a financial crisis following a change of government, Iwaki is forced to give up his mansion and dismiss most of his employees. He urges his daughter to marry Kanda, but Tomone asks Ōsaki instead to marry him. Ōsaki is hesitant to her proposal and quits his teacher's job, leaving behind a grieving Tomone. To find a new job, he approaches Matsumura, who is now running his own chauffeur service and accepts to make Ōsaki his assistant. Ōsaki learns from Matsumura that Kayo has started to work as a waitress in the Ginza.

Kayo becomes acquainted with a colleague who turns out to be none other than Ōsaki's cousin Kinue. Kinue tells her that she is looking for a man whom she still loves although he once let her down. When Kayo brings Kinue home for a visit, Kinue is confronted with Ōsaki. Although agitated, Kinue pretends that he is not the man she had been looking for. Ōsaki visits Kinue in her apartment, noting that she has been drinking, to which she replies that she started drinking because of him, and that he should turn to Kayo who sincerely loves him. A while later, Tomone marries Kanda.

Kinue and a rich customer, who has repeatedly been making advances to her at her job, unknowingly hire Matsumura and Ōsaki to drive them to a seaside hotel. Ōsaki follows them to their room and learns that Kinue wants to make her customer her patron. He knocks down her companion and slaps her, scolding her for selling herself. The hotel staff wants to hand Ōsaki over to the police, but the suddenly appearing Kanda manages to prevent Ōsaki's arrest. Tomone tells Ōsaki that she had thought of running after him although she hated him for leaving her, but is now making efforts to learn loving Kanda. The last scene shows Kanda and Tomone going on a sea voyage on a cruise liner, while the disillusioned Ōsaki and Kinue return to their village by train.

== Cast ==
- Mitsugu Fujii as Shūkichi Ōsaki
- Hiroko Kawasaki as Kinue Nishimura
- Michiko Kuwano as Tomone Iwaki
- Shiro Kanemitsu as Seiji Kanda
- Hideo Fujino as Keinosuke Iwaki, Tomone's father
- Yoshiko Tsubouchi as Kayo
- Isamu Yamaguchi as Matsumura
- Mitsuko Yoshikawa as Ōsaki's mother

== Legacy ==
In his 2004 review for Midnight Eye, William M. Drew titled Eclipse a "masterwork" which explores "the expressive possibilities of silent cinema" and depicts "the eclipse of Japanese spiritual and human values by a new culture of wealth all too willing to sacrifice love and personal relations to the pursuit of status".

Eclipse was released by Shochiku Home Video in 1990 together with four other silent Shimizu films. It was screened at the Cinémathèque française in 2020 and 2021.
