= The Battle and Fall of Przemysl =

1915 film by Albert K. Dawson

The Battle and Fall of Przemysl is a 1915 documentary war film shot on the Eastern Front by official war photographer to the Central Powers, Albert K. Dawson. Its four reels depicted the Siege of Przemyśl, disastrous for the Austrians, with incidents reenacted using soldiers as extras. Most of the film has been lost.

Footage shot by Albert K. Dawson on the eastern front, 1915
