= Mr. Thank You =

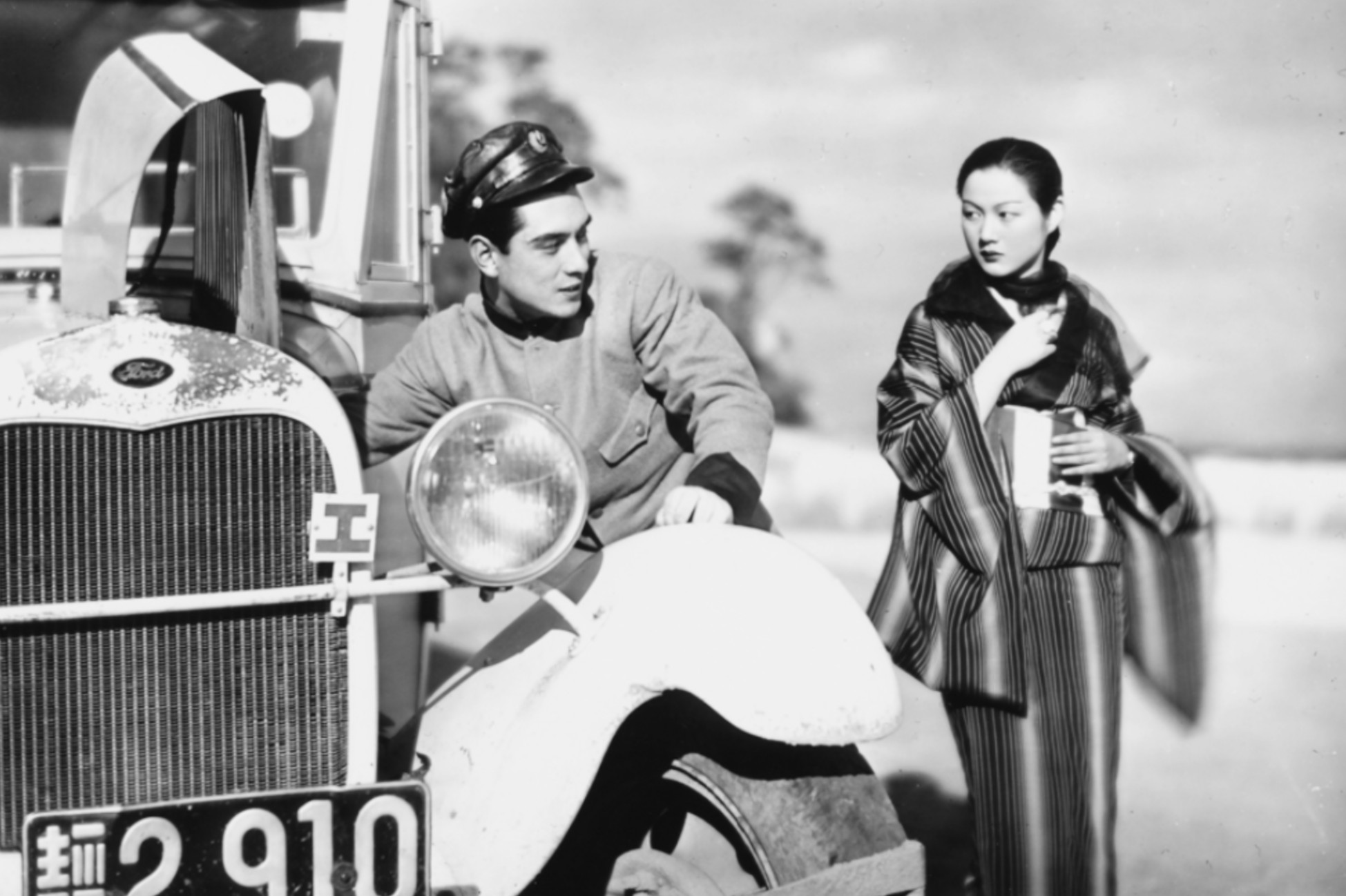
- Ken Uehara and Michiko Kuwano in Mr. Thank You
- Directed by: Hiroshi Shimizu
- Screenplay by: Hiroshi Shimizu
- Based on: Arigatō by Yasunari Kawabata
- Starring: Ken Uehara; Michiko Kuwano
- Cinematography: Isamu Aoki
- Music by: Keizō Horiuchi
- Release date: 27 February 1936
- Running time: 76 minutes
- Country: Japan
- Language: Japanese

Mr. Thank You (1936) by Hiroshi Shimizu

Mr. Thank You (有りがたうさん, Arigatō-san) is a 1936 Japanese comedy-drama film written and directed by Hiroshi Shimizu. It is based on a short story by Nobel Prize-winning novelist Yasunari Kawabata, and noted for its portrayal of depression-era Japan and its location shooting.

== Plot ==
A bus driver, nicknamed Mr. Thank You due to his expressions of gratitude to other road users who give way on the narrow mountain roads, drives from rural Izu to faraway Tokyo. The film portrays the passengers and their diverse reasons for travel, like a mother and her daughter who is destined to be sold in Tokyo, and the people they meet on the way, including a Korean working woman who makes funeral arrangements for her deceased father. In the end, Mr. Thank You marries the daughter to save her from her fate.

== Cast ==
- Ken Uehara as Mr. Thank You
- Michiko Kuwano as Woman in black collar
- Mayumi Tsukiji as Girl being sold
- Kaoru Futaba as Girl's mother
- Setsuko Shinobu as Daughter of man who returned from Tokyo
- Ryuji Ishiyama as Gentleman with beard

== Literary source ==
Mr. Thank You is based on Yasunari Kawabata's 1925 short story Thank You (Arigatō), which itself is part of his Palm-of-the-Hand Stories cycle. In Kawabata's original story, the only passengers portrayed are the mother and daughter, who are driving to a harbour town 35 miles north, where the girl will be sold to a man she has never met. The mother begs the driver to take care for her daughter, who seems to find him sympathetic. After an argument in the lodging house, where the trio stayed overnight, the driver reluctantly agrees to take the girl with him, but only for the cold season.
