= Fue no Shiratama =

1929 Japanese film

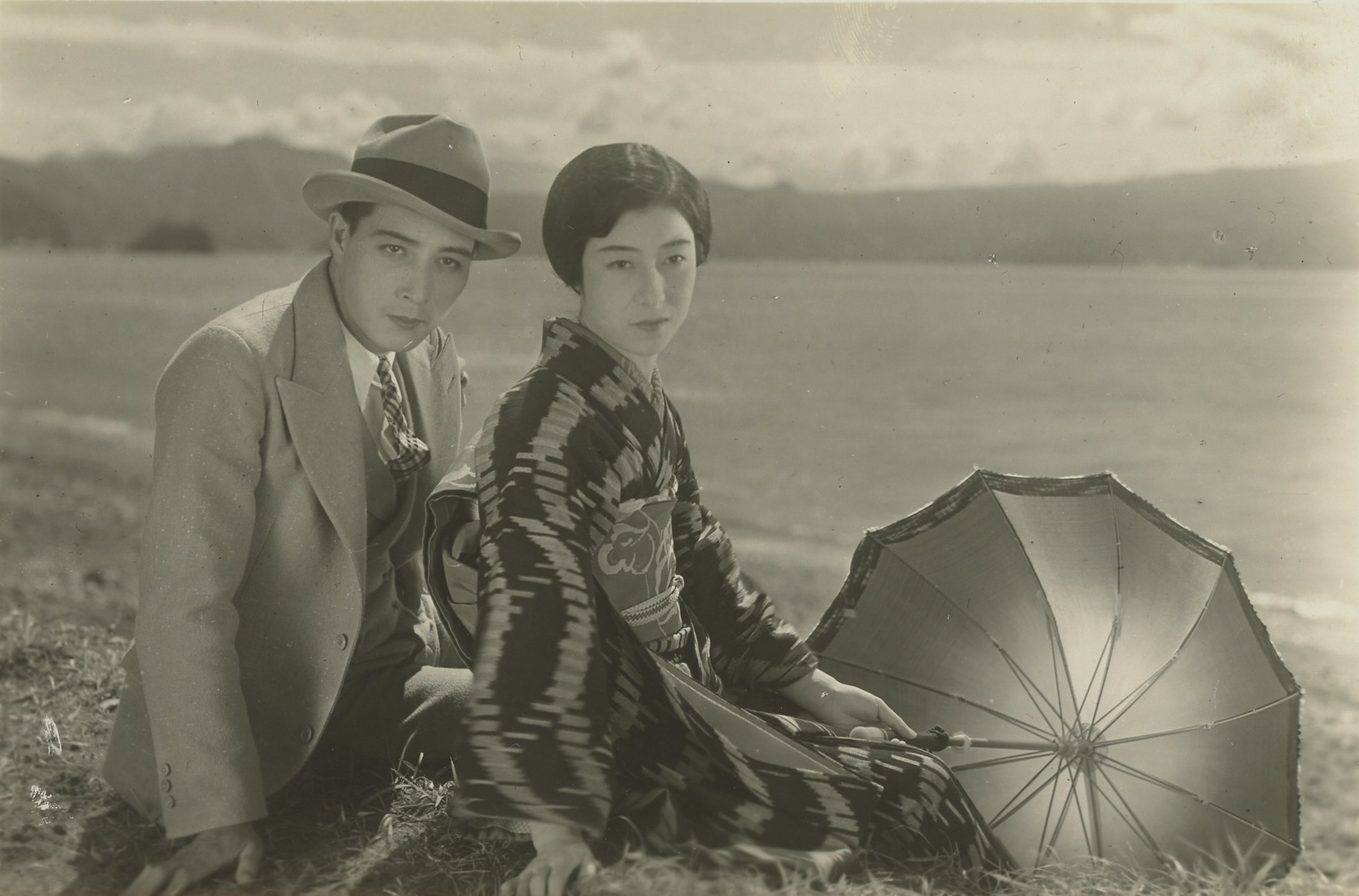
- Fue no shiratama (1929)

Japanese name
- Kanji: 不壊の白珠
- Directed by: Hiroshi Shimizu
- Written by: Tokusaburo Murakami; Kan Kikuchi (novel)
- Starring: Emiko Yagumo; Michiko Oikawa; Minoru Takada
- Cinematography: Tarō Sasaki
- Production company: Shochiku
- Distributed by: Shochiku
- Release date: 17 October 1929 (Japan)
- Running time: 101 minutes
- Country: Japan
- Language: Japanese

Fue no Shiratama (不壊の白珠; lit. "Indestructible pearl") a.k.a. Eternal Heart or Undying Pearl is a 1929 Japanese silent drama film directed by Hiroshi Shimizu. It is based on the novel of the same title by Kan Kikuchi and the earliest extant film by the director.

== Plot ==
Typist Toshie is secretly in love with Narita, an employee working at the same company, but her reticent demeanour is no match against her younger, boisterous sister Reiko, who eventually becomes Narita's wife. Soon after their wedding, Narita, distraught over Reiko's lightweight manners and materialistic attitude, asks Toshie to exert her influence on her sister. When he asks Toshie if he underestimated her feelings for him in the past, she vehemently declines.

Katayama, Toshie's superior and a widower, proposes to her, but after meeting with his children and nieces, who mock her for being a simple typist, she leaves indignantly. Reiko, bored with her marriage life, meets with a former lover, which leads to a confrontation and crisis between the couple. Toshie tries to mediate, but Reiko declares that she will never change her ways. Narita goes abroad, remaining officially married, as a divorce would be socially unacceptable. Upon his departure, he expresses his hope that Toshie will become Katayama's wife, to which she replies that she cannot tell if this will happen.

== Cast ==
- Emiko Yagumo as Toshie
- Michiko Oikawa as Reiko
- Minoru Takada as Shōzō Narita
- Jun Arai as Hirosuke Katayama

== Legacy ==
Film historian Donald Richie compared the "modernist" appearance of Fue no shiratama with Marcel l'Herbier's L'Argent, and for Hiroshi Komatsu in The Oxford History of World Cinema, the film displayed "avant-garde techniques" and "dream-like settings".

Archive prints of Fue no shiratama have been screened at the University of California in 2005, at the Cinémathèque française in 2020 and 2021, and at the Museum of Modern Art in 2022.
