= Sayon's Bell =

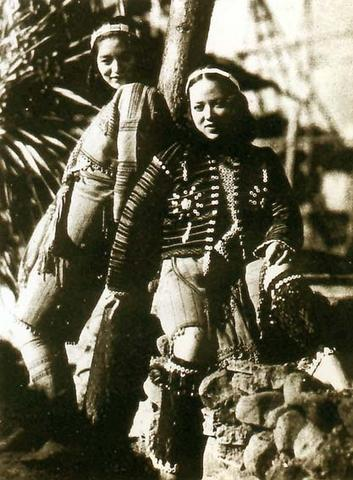
- Directed by: Hiroshi Shimizu
- Written by: Kihan Nagase; Torashiro Saitō; Hiroshi Ushida
- Starring: Toshiaki Konoe; Kenji Oyama; Shirley Yamaguchi
- Release date: 1 July 1943 (Japan)
- Running time: 75 minutes
- Countries: Japan, Manchukuo
- Language: Japanese

Sayon's Bell (サヨンの鐘, Sayon no Kane) is a 1943 black-and-white Japanese film directed by Hiroshi Shimizu and based on the true story of a 17-year-old Atayal girl called Sayun Hayun from Nan'ao village, Giran district, Taihoku Prefecture, Taiwan, who went missing and was thought to have drowned whilst helping carry the luggage of her teacher Masaki Takita during a storm in 1938.

== Cast ==
- Shirley Yamaguchi as Sayon (credited as Ri Kôran)
- Toshiaki Konoe as Takeda
- Kenji Ôyama as Murai
- Kinuko Wakamizu as Murai's Wife
- Hatsu Shimazaki as Saburo
- Kenzô Nakagawa as Mona
- Hideko Mimura as Namina
- Hiroshi Mizuhara as Pig buyer, father of Sayon
- Minoru Nakamura as Taya

== See also ==
- Cinema of Taiwan
- Taiwanese aborigines
- Atayal people
