= The Story of Tank Commander Nishizumi =

- DVD cover
- Directed by: Kōzaburō Yoshimura
- Based on: Shōwa no gunshin: Nishizumi senshachō den by Kan Kikuchi
- Starring: Ken Uehara; Shin Saburi; Michiko Kuwano
- Distributed by: Shochiku
- Release date: 1940
- Country: Japan
- Language: Japanese

The Story of Tank Commander Nishizumi (Japanese: 西住戦車長伝, Hepburn: Nishizumi senshachō den), a.k.a. The Legend of Tank Commander Nishizumi, is a 1940 Japanese war film directed by Kōzaburō Yoshimura. It is based on a true story of the Sino-Japanese War involving Japanese war hero Kojirō Nishizumi, commander in the First Tank Regiment. To make the film, Yoshimura toured the actual battlefields in China.

== Cast ==
- Ken Uehara as Nishizumi
- Takeshi Sakamoto as Gotō
- Shin Saburi as Hosoki
- Michiko Kuwano as the Chinese woman

== Historical background ==
Following his death during the Battle of Xuzhou in 1938, Nishizumi was declared Japan’s first "gunshin", or War God. His career became the subject of legend and widespread praise throughout Japan, spawning numerous biographies, songs, and novels in his honor. The Legend of Tank Commander Nishizumi was promoted by the Japanese Ministry of the Army and the Ministry of Education upon its release in 1940.

== Legacy ==
Cinema theorist Kate Taylor-Jones suggests that along with films like Mud and Soldiers and Chocolate and Soldiers, The Legend of Tank Commander Nishizumi offered "a vision of the noble, obedient and honourable Japanese army fighting to defend the Emperor and Japan."
