= Hiroshi Shimizu (director) =

Japanese film director (1903–1966)

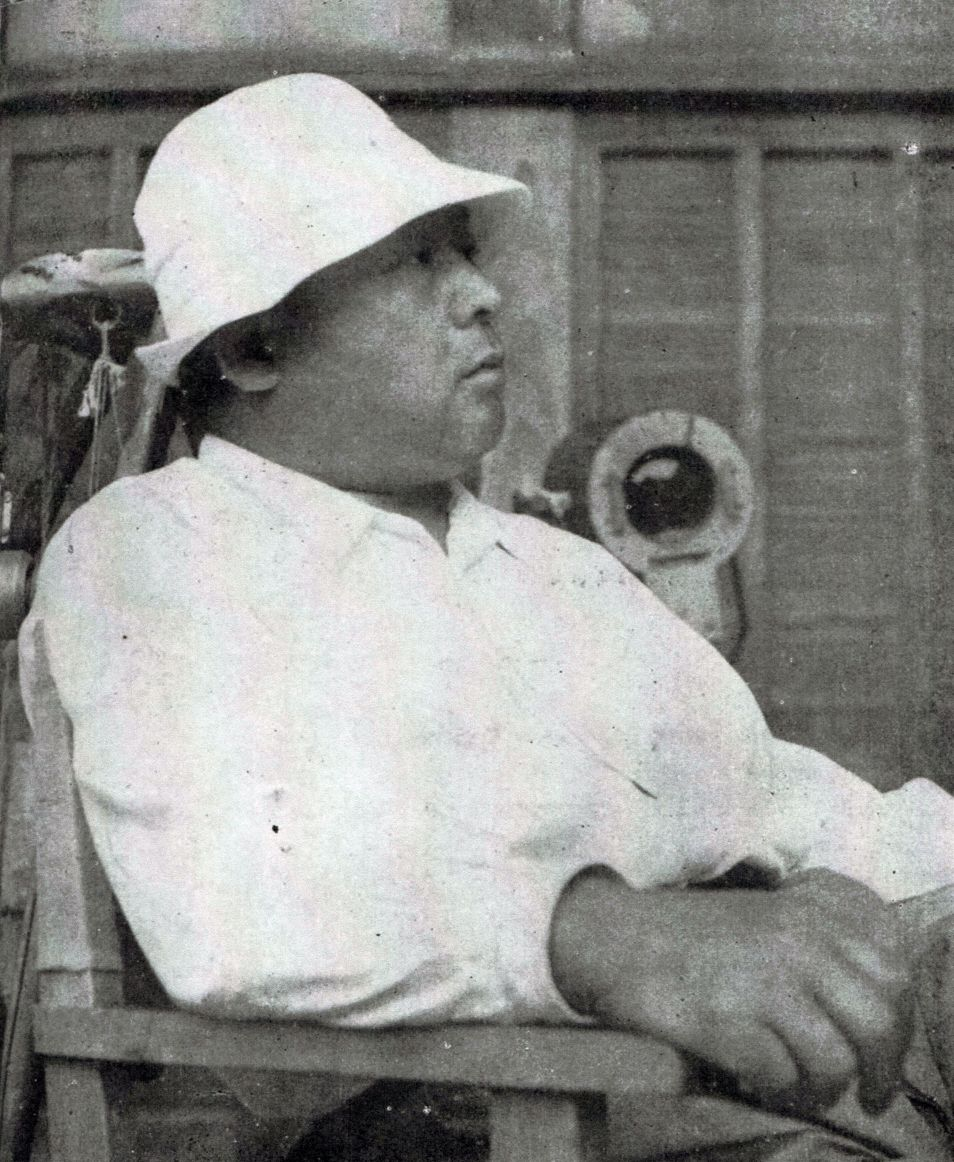
- Shimizu in 1949
- Born: 28 March 1903; Yamaka, Shizuoka, Japan
- Died: 23 June 1966 (aged 63); Kyoto, Japan
- Other names: Takahiko Minamoto, Umihiko Yuhara
- Occupations: film director, screenwriter, editor
- Years active: 1924–1959

Hiroshi Shimizu (清水宏, Shimizu Hiroshi; 28 March 1903 – 23 June 1966) was a Japanese film director, who directed over 160 films during his career.

== Biography ==
=== Early years ===
Shimizu was born in Shizuoka Prefecture and attended Hokkaidō University, but left before graduating. He joined the Shochiku film studio in Tokyo in 1921, making his directorial debut in 1924 at the age of just 21.

=== Career ===
Shimizu specialised in melodramas and comedies. In his most distinguished silent films like Fue no Shiratama (1929) and Japanese Girls at the Harbor (1933), he explored a Japan poised between native and Western ideas, traditionalism and liberalism, while stylistically relying on modernist and avant-garde techniques. The majority of his silent films are now considered lost.

In the 1930s, Shimizu increasingly took advantage of shooting on location and with non-professional actors, and was praised at the time by film critics such as Matsuo Kishi and fellow directors as Kenji Mizoguchi. Mr. Thank You (1936), The Masseurs and a Woman (1938) and Ornamental Hairpin (1941) portrayed small groups and communities of travelers or spa residents which, as film historian Alexander Jacoby points out, "concentrated more on the delineation of character than on plot". For critic Chris Fujiwara, this "unpredictability and plotlessness", in combination with the extensive use of a mobile camera, gives Shimizu's films of this era a "strikingly modern quality".

Shimizu also explored themes of maternal self-sacrifice and fallen female roles, common themes in Japanese cinema at the time. In films like Forget Love for Now (1937) and Notes of an Itinerant Performer (1941), his heroine was accepting the burden of supporting a male dependent or relative to afford him the opportunity to go to school or become successful in life. Forget Love for Now in particular was "critical of the double standard which expects women to sacrifice everything for the sake of their male dependents, while indulging in moralistic condemnation of the methods they are required to adopt to do so" (Jacoby).

Shimizu's reputation as a director has often been associated with films about children, especially Children in the Wind (1937) and Four Seasons of Childhood (1939). His experiences with child orphans after World War II led to the film Children of the Beehive (1948), independently produced by the director himself, which Jacoby calls a "masterpiece of neo-realism". Shimizu's films featured children who do not love or are unloved by their parents, children that are rejected by their peers or become social outcasts, or ones that suffer from illness and disability. While the premise of the stories differed, a common theme often persisted: Shimizu utilised individuals who are excluded from a group as a social commentary and criticism of society through the group themselves.

Films like Children in the Wind and Ornamental Hairpin have also, in retrospect, been interpreted as Shimizu's attempts to escape the realities of wartime Japan (one critic even attacked Ornamental Hairpin for wasting valuable film stock). The pressure put on Shimizu by the authorities to contribute to the war effort resulted in films like Introspection Tower (also titled The Inspection Tower, 1941) and Sayon's Bell (1943). After the war, having left Shochiku, Shimizu directed films for his own production company and the Shintoho and Daiei studios. Notable works of this era, in addition to Children of the Beehive, are Children of the Great Buddha (1952) and The Shiinomi School (1955).

Shimizu lived with actress Kinuyo Tanaka from 1927 to 1929 after she appeared in a number of his films. They separated in 1929, although she starred in some of his later films. Shimizu died of a heart attack on 23 June 1966 at the age of 63, seven years after directing his last film.

== Filmography ==
Filmography of Hiroshi Shimizu
Year	English Title	Japanese Title	Rōmaji Title
1920s
1924	Beyond the Pass	峠の彼方	Tōge no kanata
1924	The Love of a Mountain Man	山男の恋	Yamaotoko no koi
1924	Theater Before Love	恋より舞台	Koi yori butai e
1924	Song of the White Chrysanthemum	白菊の歌	Shiragiku no uta
1924	Love-Crazed Blade	恋に狂ふ刃	Koi ni kuruu yaiba
1924	The Village Pasture	村の牧場	Mura no bokujo
1925	The Little Traveling Player	小さき旅芸人	Chiisaki tabi geinin
1925	Bonfire Night	篝火の夜	Kagaribi no yoru
1925	The Pink Thorn	桃色の棘	Momoiro no toge
1925	Roar of the Torrent	激流の叫び	Gekiryū no sakebi
1925	Blade of a Righteous Man	義人の刃	Gijin no yaiba
1925	The Outdated Man	すたれ者	Sutaremono
1925	The Killing of a Hundred Men at Isshinji Temple	一心寺の百人斬	Isshin-ji no hyakuningiri
1925	Sharpness of the Blade	虎徹の斬れ味	Kotetsu no kireaji
1925	The Fleeing Warrior	落武者	Ochimusha
1925	Snare of Love	恋の捕縄	Koi no honawa
1926	Lovelorn Times	悩ましき頃	Nayamashiki koro
1926	The Beauty and the Ronin	美人と浪人	Bijin to rōnin
1926	Song of a Double Suicide in Satsuma	心中薩摩歌	Shinjū Satsuma uta
1926	Crimson Passion	真紅の情熱	Shinku no jōnetsu
1926	Kyoko and Shizuko	京子と倭文子	Kyōko to Shizuko
1926	The Betrayed Man	裏切られ者	Uragiraremono
1926	The Amorous Blade	妖刀	Yōtō
1926	Feelings in Turmoil	狂怒乱心	Kyōdoranshin
1926	Roses of Grief	嘆きの薔薇	Nageki no bara
1927	Three Daughters	三人の娘	Sannin no musume
1927	Oteru and Oyuki	お照とお雪	Oteru to Oyuki
1927	He and the Widow	彼と未亡人	Kare to mibōjin
1927	Love-Crazed Madonna	狂恋のマリア	Kyōren no Maria
1927	Spring Rain	春の雨	Haru no ame
1927	Idol of Love	恋慕夜叉	Renbo yasha
1927	Love is Tricky	恋は曲者	Koi wa kusemono
1927	Flaming Sky	炎の空	Honoo no sora
1927	Tears of Life	人生の涙	Jinsei no namida
1927	Victory over the Depression	不景気征伐	Fukeiki seibatsu
1927	Shortcut to Success	出世の近道	Shusse no chikamichi
1927	A Country Dandy	田舎の伊達男	Inaka no dateotoko
1928	A Portrait of Changing Love	愛欲変相図	Aiyoku hensōzu
1928	The Woman Who Calls to the Sea	海に叫ぶ女	Umi ni sakebu onna
1928	A Couple's Pilgrimage of Love	恋愛二人行脚	Ren’ai futari angya
1928	Dance, Young People	踊れ若者	Odore wakamono
1928	A Woman of the Showa Period	昭和の女	Shōwa no onna
1928	Childhood Friends	幼なじみ	Osananajimi
1928	A Picked-Up Bride	拾った花嫁	Hirotta hanayome
1928	Mountain Echo	山彦	Yamabiko
1928	Beautiful Best friends	美しき朋輩達	Utsukushiki hōhaitachi
1929	The Village Blacksmith	森の鍛冶屋	Mori no kajiya
1929	Duck Woman	あひる女	Ahiru onna
1929	Magic of Tokyo	東京の魔術	Tōkyō no majutsu
1929	Escort Girls	ステッキガール	Sutteki gāru
1929	Travel Manners of a Vagrant Girl	浮草娘旅風俗	Ukikusa musume tabifūzoku
1929	The Village Champion	村の王者	Mura no ōja
1929	Cheerful Song	陽気な唄	Yōkina uta
1929	Parent	親	Oya
1929	Proud of My Son	自慢の倅	Jiman no segare
1929	Fue no Shiratama	不壊の白珠	Fue no shiratama
1929	Father's Desire	父の願ひ	Chichi no negai
1929	Short Song of Love	恋慕小唄	Renbo kouta
1929	Love: Part One	恋愛第一課	Ren’ai: Daiikka
1930s
1930	Sin on Red Lips	紅唇罪あり	Kōshin tsumi ari
1930	True Love	真実の愛	Shinjitsu no ai
1930	Standing at a Crossroads	岐路に立ちて	Kiro ni tachite
1930	Embrace	抱擁	Hōyō
1930	March of the Sea	海の行進曲	Umi no kōshinkyoku
1930	Filtration Is Another Thing	浮気ばかりは別者だ	Uwaki bakari wa betsumono da
1930	Youthful Blood Dances	青春の血は躍る	Seishun no chi wa odoru
1930	Daybreak in the Mist	霧の中の曙	Kiri no naka no akebono
1930	Living in a New Era	新時代に生きる	Shin jidai ni ikiru
1931	Bully	餓鬼大将	Gaki daishō
1931	The Milky Way	銀河	Ginga
1931	Crossed Line Between Husband and Wife	混線ニタ夫婦	Konsen nita fūfu
1931	Follower of Grief	有憂華	Ureibana
1931	Chalk It Up to Experience	そりゃ実感よ	Sorya jikkan yo
1931	Shining Love	かがやく愛	Kagayaku ai
1931	This Mother Has Sinned	この母に罪ありや	Kono haha ni tsumi ari ya
1931	Windmill of Life	人生の風車	Jinsei no fūsha
1931	An Illustrated Guide to Youth	青春図会	Seishunzue
1931	Seven Seas: Part One: Virginity Chapter	七つの海 前篇 処女篇	Nanatsu no umi: Zenpen: Shojo hen
1932	Passion	情熱	Jōnetsu
1932	Seven Seas: Part Two: Chastity Chapter	七つの海 後篇 貞操篇	Nanatsu no umi: Kōhen: Teisō hen
1932	Manchurian Marching Song	満州行進曲	Manshū kōshinkyoku
1932	The Army's Big March	陸軍大行進	Rikugun daikōshin
1932	King of the Sea	海の王者	Umi no ōja
1932	Love's Windbreak	愛の防風林	Ai no bōfūrin
1932	Dawn after the Midnight Sun	白夜は明くる	Byakuya wa akuru
1932	The Star of the Student Quarter	学生街の花形	Gakuseigai no hanagata
1932	Stormy Region	暴風帯	Bōfūtai
1933	Sleep, at Mother's Breast	眠れ母の胸に	Nemure haha no mune ni
1933	The Lady Who Wept in Spring	泣き濡れた春の女よ	Nakinureta haru no onna yo
1933	Japanese Girls at the Harbor	港の日本娘	Minato no Nihon musume
1933	Dexterity in Love	恋愛一刀流	Ren’ai ittōryū
1933	A Traveler's Dream	旅寝の夢	Tabine no yume
1933	The Boss's Son at College	大学の若旦那	Daigaku no wakadanna
1934	Mother from the Far East	東洋の母	Tōyō no haha
1934	Want to Know about Love	恋を知りそめ申し候	Koi o shirisome mōshisōrō
1934	The Boss's Son at College: Record of Valor	大学の若旦那・武勇伝	Daigaku no wakadanna: Buyūden
1934	Gion Festival Music	祇園囃子	Gion bayashi
1934	The Boss's Son at College: Shooting the Breeze	大学の若旦那・太平楽	Daigaku no wakadanna: Taiheiraku
1934	Eclipse	金環蝕	Kinkanshoku
1934	Love on a School Excursion	恋愛修学旅行	Ren’ai shūgaku ryokō
1934	The Boss's Son: Cloudless Skies	大学の若旦那・日本晴れ	Daigaku no wakadanna: Nihonbare
1935	A Hero of Tokyo	東京の英雄	Tōkyō no eiyū
1935	The Boss's Son's Youthful Innocence	若旦那 春爛漫	Wakadanna haruranman
1935	The Man and the Woman and the Boys	彼と彼女と少年達	Kare to kanojo to shōnentachi
1935	Double Heart	双心臓	Sōshinzō
1935	Love in Luxury	恋愛豪華版	Ren’ai gōka ban
1936	The Boss's Son Is a Millionaire	若旦那 百万石	Wakadanna hyakumangoku
1936	Mountain Range of Emotion	感情山脈	Kanjō sanmyaku
1936	Mr. Thank You	有りがたうさん	Arigatō-san
1936	Law of Love	愛の法則	Ai no hōsoku
1936	Heaven and Earth Are Free	自由の天地	Jiyū no tenchi
1936	Sing in a Loud Voice	君よ高らかに歌へ	Kimi yo takaraka ni utae
1936	Youth in Full Dress	青春満艦飾	Seishun mankanshoku
1937	Loves of the Invincible Fleet	恋愛無敵艦隊	Ren’ai muteki kantai
1937	The Golden Demon	金色夜叉	Konjiki yasha
1937	Forget Love for Now	恋も忘れて	Koi mo wasurete
1937	Farewell, I Go to the Front	さらば戦線へ	Saraba sensen e
1937	Children in the Wind	風の中の子供	Kaze no naka no kodomo
1937	A Star Athlete	花形選手	Hanagata senshu
1938	New Domestic History	新家庭暦	Shin katei reki
1938	Departure	出発	Shuppatsu
1938	Cheerleaders’ Song	応援歌	Ōenka
1938	The Masseurs and a Woman	按摩と女	Anma to onna
1938	Family Diary	家庭日記	Katei nikki
1939	A Freeloader's Big Snore	居候は高鼾	Isōrō wa takaibiki
1939	Four Seasons of Children	子供の四季	Kodomo no shiki
1939	A Woman's Panners: Part One: Young Girl's Diary	女の風俗 第一話お嬢さんの日記	Onna no fūzoku: Daiichiwa: Ojōsan no nikki
1939	Flowering Weed	花のある雑草	Hana no aru zassō
1939	Mulberries Are Red	桑の実は紅い	Kuwa no mi wa akai
1940s
1940	I Have a Husband	私には夫がある	Watashi ni wa otto ga aru
1940	Nobuko	信子	Nobuko
1940	Friends	ともだち	Tomodachi
1940	Woman's Fickle Heart	女人転心	Nyonin tenshin
1941	Introspection Tower	みかへりの搭	Mikaeri no tō
1941	Notes of an Itinerant Performer	歌女おぼえ書	Utajo oboegaki
1941	Acorns	団栗と椎の実	Donguri to shiinomi
1941	Dawn Chorus	暁の合唱	Akatsuki no gasshō
1941	Ornamental Hairpin	簪	Kanzashi
1942	Record of a Woman Doctor	女医の記録	Joi no kiroku
1942	Meeting of a Brother and Sister	兄妹会議	Kyōdai kaigi
1943	Sayon's Bell	サヨンの鐘	Sayon no kane
1945	Victory Song	必勝歌	Hisshōka
1948	Children of the Beehive	蜂の巣の子供たち	Hachi no su no kodomotachi
1948	Tomorrow There Will Be Fine Weather	明日は日本晴れ	Asu wa nihonbare
1949	At Eighteen a Girl Tells Lies	娘十八嘘つき時代	Musume jūhachi usotsuki jidai
1949	Ohara Shōsuke	小原庄助さん	Ohara Shōsuke-san
1950s
1950	A Mother's Love	母情	Bojō
1951	Children of the Beehive: What Happened Next	その後の蜂の巣の子供達	Sono go no hachi no su no kodomotachi
1951	Under the Blossoming Peach	桃の花の咲く下で	Momo no hana no saku shita de
1952	Children of the Great Buddha	大仏さまと子供たち	Daibutsu-sama to kodomotachi
1953	Mole Alley	もぐら横丁	Mogura yokochō
1953	Ancient Buddhas of Nara	奈良には古き仏たち	Nara ni wa furuki hotoketachi
1953	Profile of a City	都会の横顔	Tokai no yokogao
1954	The Second Kiss	第二の接吻	Daini no seppun
1954	Old Woman and Children at Toshodai-ji	唐招提寺にて お婆さんと子供たち	Tōshōdai-ji nite obāsan to kodomotachi
1955	The Shiinomi School	しいのみ学園	Shiinomi gakuen
1955	The Tale of Jiro	次郎物語	Jirō monogatari
1956	Why Did These Women Become Like This?	何故彼女等はそうなったか	Naze kanojora wa sō natta ka
1956	Stupid with Kindness	人情馬鹿	Ninjō baka
1956	Children Seeking a Mother	母を求める子等	Haha o motomeru kora
1956	Sound in the Mist	霧の音	Kiri no oto
1957	Dancing Girl	踊子	Odoriko
1958	A Mother's Journey	母の旅路	Haha no tabiji
1959	Image of a Mother	母のおもかげ	Haha no omokage

== Legacy ==
Archive copies of Shimizu's extant films have been shown at the Cinémathèque française, the Museum of Modern Art, the Berlin International Film Festival, and other institutions and festivals.

In 2008, Shochiku released two box sets which include eight of his films (Region 2 format, with both Japanese and English subtitles). The first box set contained the films Japanese Girls at the Harbor, Mr. Thank You, The Masseurs and a Woman and Ornamental Hairpin. The second box set contained Children in the Wind, Nobuko, Introspection Tower and Four Seasons of Children. In 2009, a Criterion Collection box set of four of his films (corresponding to the first Shochiku set) was released in the Region 1 format.
