= John Belton (academic) =

American academic

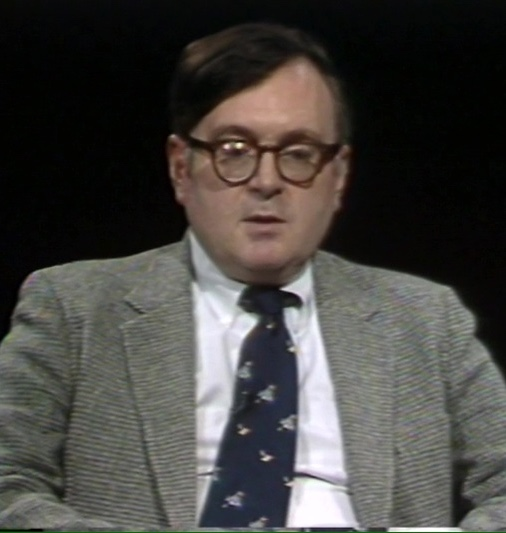
Belton on CUNY TV's Cinema Then, Cinema Now (1987)

John Belton is Professor Emeritus of English and Film at Rutgers University. He is editor of the Film and Culture series at Columbia University Press and associate editor of SMPTE's Motion Imaging Journal. He earned his PhD from Harvard University, BA from Columbia University, and specializes in film history and cultural studies. Belton has served on the National Film Preservation Board, as chair of the Board of Editors of the Society of Motion Picture and Television Engineers, and authored numerous books. In 2005/2006, he was granted a Guggenheim Fellowship to pursue his study of the use of digital technology in the film industry.

== Publications ==
- Hollywood Professionals Volume 3: Hawks, Borzage, and Ulmer (1974)
- Robert Mitchum (1976)
- with Elisabeth Weis (1985). Film Sound: Theory and Practice. New York: Columbia University Press. ISBN 978-0-231-05636-6.
- "Widescreen Cinema". Harvard Film Studies. November 1992.
- Film History: Audiences and Fans (1995)
- "Cinema Stylists". Filmmakers (2). May 30, 1995.
- Movies and Mass Culture. New Brunswick, NJ: Rutgers University Press. 1996. ISBN 978-0-8135-2227-2.
- Alfred Hitchcock's Rear Window. Cambridge; New York: Cambridge University Press. 2000. ISBN 978-0-521-56423-6.
- American Cinema/American Culture. New York: McGraw-Hill. 1994. ISBN 978-0-07-004466-1.
- Belton, John (Fall 2003). "Can Hitchcock Be Saved from Hitchcock Studies?" (PDF). Cineaste. 28 (4): 16–21. ISSN 0009-7004.
- Introduction to Film (2008)

== Alfred Hitchcock's Rear Window ==
Alfred Hitchcock's film Rear Window (1954) is a thriller starring James Stewart as Jeffries, an action-seeking photographer who is chair-ridden due to his fast-paced career, and Grace Kelly as Lisa Carol Fremont, Jeffries' ritzy, high-fashion love interest. Jeffries' boredom forces him to spy on his neighbors all day and night, which leads him and Lisa to find themselves in the middle of a shifty scandal suspecting their neighbor to be a murderer.

In his book Alfred Hitchcock's Rear Window, Belton addresses the underlying issues of voyeurism, scopophilia, patriarchy, and feminism that are evident in the film. He states: "Rear Window's story is 'about' spectacle; it explores the fascination with looking and the attraction of that which is being looked at."
