= Albert K. Dawson =

American WW1 photographer and news reporter

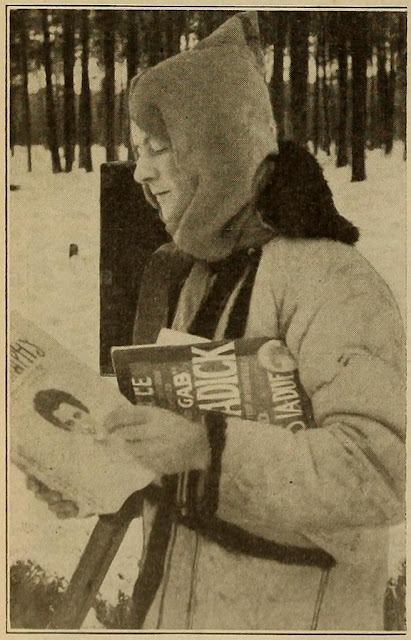
- Dawson on the Balkan front, winter 1915–1916
- Born: September 20, 1885; Vincennes, Indiana
- Died: February 17, 1967 (aged 81); New York City, New York
- Occupation: Photographer
- Spouse: Clara. L. Hawkey (1898-1974)
- Children: Robert K. Dawson (1925-1980)
- Parent(s): Thomas A. Dawson and Lida T. Knox

Albert Knox Dawson (September 20, 1885 – February 17, 1967) was an American photojournalist and film correspondent who covered World War I with the German, Austro-Hungarian and Bulgarian Armies.

== Early life ==
Albert Knox Dawson was born in Vincennes, Indiana, on September 20, 1885. He was the oldest son of Thomas A. Dawson and Lida T. Knox. His father was a local bank officer, contractor and real estate manager.

At an early age, Dawson began experimenting with taking pictures. Out of his fascination with photography grew a professional career as a cameraman.

== Career as a photographer ==
In 1907, Dawson left Vincennes and after a photographic assignment in Cuba he began working in 1908 for the photographic agency Underwood & Underwood in New York City. In 1912, Dawson started his photographic firm Brown & Dawson which was based in Stamford, Connecticut.

From November 1914 until February 1916, Dawson was a photographer at the European front. His regular news pictures were distributed through his firm Brown & Dawson which specialized in stock photography. His documentary films were released by the American Correspondent Film Company. Dawson contributed to the following motion pictures: The Battle and Fall of Przemysl, The Battles of A Nation, System - The Secret of Success, Friends and Foes, and The Warring Millions/Fighting Germans. He was attached to the German, Austro-Hungarian and Bulgarian armies.

Albert Dawson was among the most active American photographers during World War I. In July 1917, he was among the first photographic officers who received a commission in the U.S. Signal Corps, together with Edwin F. Weigle of the Chicago Tribune and photographer Edward J. Steichen. Dawson was promoted to captain in November 1917 and put in charge of building the new military photographic laboratory in Washington, D.C. Dawson was also instrumental in training the first official American war photographers.

After the war, Dawson worked in the tourist trade for the American Express Company. During World War II, he was on the staff of the Coordinator of Inter-American Affairs. Albert Dawson died in New York City on February 17, 1967. He was buried at Poughkeepsie Rural Cemetery.

== Film work ==
Various segments from Dawson's war footage have been found by authors Ron van Dopperen and Cooper C. Graham while researching their book American Cinematographers in the Great War, 1914-1918.

While following the Austro-Hungarian army at the Eastern Front in the summer of 1915, Dawson produced this motion picture report on the Russian trench system that has partly been retrieved by the authors at the nitrate film vaults of the Library of Congress.

Camera correspondent Albert K. Dawson in wartime Europe (1915)

During his stay in Berlin, Dawson made still and moving pictures of Roger Casement, the famous Irish nationalist who at the time was involved in raising a revolt in Ireland against the British. Dawson's film was located by the authors in 2016 in the collection of the Library of Congress. These historical scenes taken by Dawson in Berlin in 1915 can be viewed here. The films are the only extant footage showing Roger Casement.

Dawson's film work during World War I featured in the documentary Mobilizing Movies! The U.S. Signal Corps Goes to War, 1917-1919.

Documentary on the official American film cameramen in World War I

== Sources ==
- Kevin Brownlow, The War, The West and The Wilderness (London/New York 1979)
- Ron van Dopperen, "Shooting the Great War: Albert Dawson and the American Correspondent Film Company, 1914-1918", Film History vol. 2 (1990), 123–129.
- Ron van Dopperen and Cooper C. Graham, "Film Flashes of the European Front: The War Diary of Albert K. Dawson." Film History vol. 23 (2011), 20–37.
- Ron van Dopperen and Cooper C. Graham, Shooting the Great War: Albert Dawson and the American Correspondent Film Company (KDP Publishing 2026, 9th printing) ISBN 978-1-4909-4466-1
- Book review "Shooting the Great War: Albert Dawson and the American Correspondent Film Company", Historical Journal of Film, Radio & Television (2015)
- James W. Castellan, Ron van Dopperen, Cooper C. Graham, American Cinematographers in the Great War, 1914-1918 (New Barnet, 2015), doi:10.2307/j.ctt1bmzn8c
- Book review "American Cinematographers in the Great War, 1914-1914" Historical Journal of Film, Radio & Television (2016)
- Cooper C. Graham and Ron van Dopperen, “Roger Casement on Screen: the Background Story on an Historical Film Opportunity”, Historical Journal of Film, Radio and Television, online edition 2016, https://doi.org/10.1080/01439685.2015.1100386
- Weblog on the American Films and Cinematographers of World War I, 2013-2018
- "Die Reise Nach Ivangorod", article in Deutsch Amerika (January 1917) - excerpts from Dawson's war diary

== Films and photos ==
- Albert K. Dawson - World War I Cinematographer - Online video presentation for the 2015 IAMHIST Conference
- Albert K. Dawson: The Kaiser's Cameraman (World War I pictures from the National Archives and Library of Congress)
- U.S. Signal Corps Great War Photographers - featuring Captain Albert K. Dawson and his cameramen, November 1917 (pictures from the National Archives)
- The Battle and Fall of Przemysl (American Correspondent Film Company/USA, 1915)
- Various film segments produced by the American Correspondent Film Company in 1915, showing camera correspondent Albert K. Dawson
- Film Lecture The Battle and Fall of Przemysl (American Correspondent Film Company/USA, 1915) PDF
- The Battles of a Nation (American Correspondent Film Company/USA, 1915)
- The Battles of a Nation (USA, 1915) - original film titles, PDF
- The Warring Millions (USA, 1915/1916) - original film titles, PDF
- "Mobilizing Movies! The U.S. Signal Corps Goes To War, 1917-1919" (documentary, 4K improved video edit, 2026)
- American Cameramen in World War I - video reconstruction with Signal Corps pictures (2026)
- Movie Trailer "American Cinematographers in the Great War, 1914-1918"
