= Hiroyuki Nishimoto =

Japanese actor (1927–2015)

- Born: 3 January 1927; Tokyo, Japan
- Died: 19 April 2015 (aged 88)
- Occupations: Actor, voice actor
- Years active: 1950s–2015

Hiroyuki Nishimoto (西本裕行, Nishimoto Hiroyuki; 3 January 1927 – 19 April 2015) was a Japanese actor and voice actor. He began acting in the theatre company Bungakuza and later co-founded Gekidan Kumo (劇団雲 "Cloud Theatre Company") in 1963. Nishimoto then joined Theatre Company Subaru in 1976. He provided the voice of Snufkin in the television adaptions of Moomin, a book series and comic strip by Tove Jansson. Nishimoto was also known for dubbing the Japanese language versions of many Disney films. He died of an aortic dissection on April 19, 2015, aged 88.

== Partial filmography ==
- The Woman in the Dunes (1964)
- Goke, Body Snatcher from Hell (1968)
- The Beast to Die (1974)

Television

- Moomin
- Mito Kōmon
- The Return of Ultraman
- Taiyō ni Hoero!
- Kamen Rider
- Space Sheriff Gavan
- Kamen Rider Black RX
- New Moomin
