= Shi Hou =

Shi Hou or Shihou may refer to:

- Shihou Township, in Ningde, Fujian, China
- Shihō, ceremonies in Sōtō Zen Buddhism
- Empress Shi (史后; Shǐ Hòu, fl. 23), wife of Wang Mang
- Liu Bian (176–190), emperor of the Han dynasty, known as Marquis Shi (史侯; Shǐ Hóu) before he was enthroned in 189
- Monkey King, a fictional character from Journey to the West, known as Stone Monkey (石猴; Shí Hóu) in the novel's first chapter

== See also ==
- Shiho (given name), Japanese given name
