= Shiho (disambiguation) =

Shihō is a series of ceremonies in Soto Zen Buddhism.

Shiho may also refer to:

- Shiho (given name), including a list of people and fictional characters with the name
- Shiho (actress) (born 1992), Japanese actress and model
