= New Moomin =

Japanese anime television series

- Moomintroll and Snufkin

新ムーミン (Shin Mūmin)
- Genre: Fantasy
- Created by: Tove Jansson
- Anime television series
- Directed by: Rintaro
- Written by: Keisuke Fujikawa; Shun'ichi Yukimuro et al.
- Music by: Seiichirō Uno
- Studio: Zuiyo Enterprise; Mushi Productions
- Licensed by: Zuiyo Enterprise
- Original network: Fuji TV
- Original run: 9 January 1972 – 31 December 1972
- Episodes: 52

New Moomin (新ムーミン, Shin Mūmin) is a Japanese anime television series produced by Zuiyo Enterprise and animated by Mushi Production. The series is a sequel series to the series Moomin, which aired from 1969 to 1970, and is based largely on the Moomin books by Finnish writer Tove Jansson. It was produced in 1972 as part of the Calpis Comic Theater (later known as World Masterpiece Theater) and broadcast on Fuji TV.

As in the previous series, Jansson never approved of the series, due to their dramatic changes with the plots, overall atmosphere, and character personalities. Also, the series has never been released in principle since 1990 including in Japan, when a new anime television series Moomin was released with the full involvement of Jansson herself.

== Summary ==
It was initially simply broadcast as Moomin and subsequently retitled Shin Moomin to distinguish it from the 1969 series.

Since most of the staff and cast from the 1969 series have been retained, most elements were maintained from the 1969 series, starting with the characterization. Also, the content can be considered a sequel to the previous series, even though it is a stand-alone work. For this reason, Mami Hagiwara, a freelance writer who writes a series of articles for the official Moomin website in Japan, refers to this series as "Season 2 of the 1969 series".

Although few changes have been made, it is more faithful to Jansson's book than the 1969 series. The story has a stronger fantasy element and more moralistic episodes. As for the character designs, minor changes were made in several places, including larger black eyes and the addition of hair to Snufkin. In addition, Too-Ticky makes her first appearance in this series and plays an active role in many episodes.

Although Jansson had a negative opinion of the series, she once did a painting of Snufkin based on his appearance in the series, in which he is much taller, wears flowers on his hat and carries a guitar.

Since 1990, Moomin Characters, Ltd, which manages the Moomin copyrights, has not released this series to the public in principle along with the previous series.

== Production ==
The first Moomin animated series, which aired from 1969 to 1970, received negative reviews from the original author, Tove Jansson, but was well received by viewers and sponsors and ended after the broadcast period was extended. The project for this series was then launched.

Initially, the idea of creating a completely new look for the Moomins, reflecting Jansson's ideas, was floated, but it was decided that it would be a bad idea to change the image of the existing series, so the Moomins were born as Japanese-style Moomins, with no plans for overseas development.

When Jansson produced this series, she agreed to maintain the style and setting of the 1969 series, provided that it would not be exported. Therefore, neither the series nor its 1969 predecessor broadcast outside Japan except Taiwan, which aired in TTV.

== Reception ==
Shizue Kaneko, a well-known Japanese animator, has highly praised this anime, describing it as "the bible of family-friendly animation. Kaneko praised the animation techniques and direction, and said, "While referring to the original work, the story is mostly original, and it tells a philosophical story, such as the loneliness of adults, and the depiction of life. I feel that the creators were determined to convey the world's truths and life lessons to children in an easy-to-understand way, even if it was a bit stale. It is a masterpiece that sacrifices commercialism because of that commitment.".

== Cast ==
- Kyoko Kishida as Moomintroll
- Akiko Takamura as Moominmamma
- Hitoshi Takagi as Moominpappa
- Reiko Mutō as Non-Non (Snork Maiden)
- Kosei Tomita as Sniff
- Junko Hori as Little My
- Masashi Amenomori as Hemulen
- Joji Yanami as The Muskrat
- Hiroyuki Nishimoto as Snufkin
- Chikao Ohtsuka as Stinky
- Sachiko Chijimatsu as Sorry-oo
- Yoshiko Yamamoto as Too-Ticky

== Episodes ==
#	Japanese Original Title	Translated from the Japanese
1	" ゆめ・ゆめ・ゆめ"	Dream, Dream, and Dream
2	"春を呼ぶ火祭り"	Fire Festival to Usher in Spring
3	"今日は、おしゃまさん"	Hello, Precocious Girl (=Too-Ticky)
4	"スナフキンが帰って来た"	Snufkin's Back
5	"狼なんかこわくない"	Who's Afraid of Wolf? (parody of "Who's Afraid of Virginia Woolf?")
6	"落ちてきた星の子"	Down Came a Star Child
7	"白い馬と満月と"	With White Horse and Full Moon
8	"ふしぎなスプーン"	Mysterious Spoon
9	"おじさんは手品師? "	Is Uncle a Magician?
10	"署長さんがいなくなる"	The Police Inspector is Gone
11	"ムーミン谷は穴だらけ"	Moomin Valley is Full of Holes
12	"鏡の中のマネマネ"	Mane-Mane(Mimicry) in the Mirror
13	"ヘムレンさんの約束"	The Hemulen's Promise
14	"メソメソ君のマイホーム"	The House of Meso-Meso (=Sorry-oo)
15	"ムダ騒動はムダ"	Pointless Disturbance is Pointless
16	"ミイってやさしいの? "	Is Mee Tender?
17	"ノンノンの願い"	Nonnon’s Wish
18	"海の風車"	Windmill of the Sea
19	"ふしぎな遊星人"	Mysterious Alien from Planet
20	"ママのハンドバッグ"	Mama's Handbag
21	"花占い大事件"	The Big Incident of Flower Divination
22	"町からきた少年"	Boy from Town
23	"ママ、ごめんなさい"	Sorry, Mama
24	"時計を作ろう"	Let's Make the Clock
25	"夏への扉"	The Door into Summer (quotation from "The Door into Summer")
26	"金色のしっぽ"	Golden Tail
27	"ニョロニョロが怒った"	Nyoro-Nyoro(=Hattifatteners) Get Angry
28	"信じる?信じない? "	To Believe or Not to Believe?
29	"水晶玉にはなにがみえる"	What is Visible in the Crystal Ball?
30	"消えないおばけ"	Ghost Who Doesn't Disappear
31	"おかしなケンカ"	Strange Quarrel
32	"消えた人形"	The Missing Doll
33	"ひとりぽっちのパパ"	Lonely Papa
34	"ぼくは王様だ!"	I'm King!
35	"パパの古い靴"	Papa's Old Shoes
36	"おじいちゃんは世界一"	Grandpa is No.1 in the World
37	"月夜になる鐘"	The Bell that Rings on Moonlit Nights
38	"赤い月の呪い"	Curse of the Red Moon
39	"笑いの仮面"	Mask of Laughter
40	"やぶれた絵本"	Torn Picture-Book
41	"言葉が消える?"	The Words Disappear?
42	"はばたけ!ペガサス"	Flutter! Pegasus
43	"アリオンのたて琴"	Arion's Harp
44	"雲と遊ぼう"	Let's play with the Clouds
45	"眠りたい眠れない"	Want to Sleep, Cannot Sleep
46	"飛行鬼にまけるな!"	Don’t Be Defeated by the Flying Demon (=The Hobgoblin) !
47	"氷の国をぬけだせ"	Get Away from Icy Country
48	"こわれたくびかざり"	Broken Necklace
49	"消えちゃった冬"	Winter Which Has Disappeared
50	"パパのぼうけん"	Papa's Adventure
51	"スナフキンなんか大きらい"	I Hate You, Snufkin
52	"さらばムーミン谷"	Farewell, Moomin Valley

== Home media ==
In 1989, all episodes were released on VHS. 2 or 3 episodes per volume, for a total of 26 volumes. Released by Tohokushinsha Film Corporation. Distributed by VAP, Inc.

== See also ==
- Moomin (1969 TV series)
- Moomin (1990 TV series)
