= Kumo Theatre Company =

Japanese theatre company

- 劇団雲; Gekidan Kumo
- Formation: 1963
- Dissolved: 1975 (merged to form Subaru Theatre Company)
- Type: Theatre group
- Purpose: Shingeki, Shakespeare
- Location: Tokyo, Japan
- Artistic director: Tsuneari Fukuda

The Kumo Theatre Company (劇団雲, Gekidan Kumo) was a Japanese theatre company that staged Western-style plays. In 1963, its members split from the Bungakuza company to form their own troupe in response to what they viewed as their former troupe's overly leftist politics.

In 1976, the Kumo Theatre Company merged with the Keyaki Theatre Company to form the new Subaru Theatre Company, which still exists.

== History ==
Gekidan Kumo, meaning "The Cloud Theatre Company," was founded in 1963 by Tsuneari Fukuda, along with Hiroshi Akutagawa, Hiroyuki Nishimoto, and other members of the Bungakuza company of Shingeki theatre players. In the 1950s, many Shingeki theatre troupes were viewed as left-wing or even communist. However, Bungakuza was considered one of the least ideological troupes. Thus many people were surprised when Bungakuza's leaders agreed to stage a tour of Communist China in 1961. Even more controversial was the decision to modify the script of the company's flagship play, "The Life of a Woman" (Onna no isshō), to accommodate the ideological demands of their Chinese hosts, which was seen as an abridgment of artistic freedom. This angered many of the younger members of the troupe, and in late 1962, right in the middle of the company's New Year's production, 29 members abruptly announced that they were leaving the company In January 1963, they joined with Tsuneari Fukuda, a well known translator of Shakespeare plays, to found their own company, the Cloud Theatre Company (Gekidan Kumo).

Fukuda was more conservative, and thought that Shingeki had become too ideological. Under his direction, Gekidan Kumo performed numerous Shakespeare plays in Japanese translation, plays by western playwrights such as Eugene O'Neill and Bernard Shaw that Shingeki troupes had tended to ignore, and new plays written by Japanese playwrights.

In 1975, Gekidan Kumo disbanded due to creative disagreements among its members, and in 1976, Fukuda and the majority of the troupe merged with another troupe, Gekidan Keyaki, to form the Subaru Theatre Company (Gekidan Subaru), which was also under Fukuda's direction. In honoring Fukuda's legacy, to this day Gekidan Subaru continues to prominently feature Shakespeare plays in Japanese translation.

== Notable members ==
- Hiroshi Arikawa
- Tsutomu Yamazaki
- Asao Koike
- Tsuneari Fukuda
- Shigeru Kōyama
- Hiroyuki Nishimoto
- Masato Sako
