= Theatre Company Subaru =

Japanese theatre company

The Theatre Company Subaru (劇団昴, gekidan subaru) is a theatre company based in Tokyo, Japan, founded by Tsuneari Fukuda in 1976.

== Overview ==
The origin of the troupe can be traced back to 1963, when playwright Fukuda first established the Kumo Theatre Company together with Hiroshi Akutagawa. Akutagawa had quit the Bungaku-za to join Fukuda, accompanied by 31 actors. Fukuda pursued the conservative, literary realization through performances of major Shakespeare plays. Subaru was formed in 1976, as a merger and reformation with its sister theatre company Keyaki.

The theatre has staged 115 performances between 1976 and 2006. Yet "with its solid ensemble and original titles while opposing commercialism", their homebase sanbyaku nin theatre could not be saved from being shut down, due to deterioration.

== Subaru Theatre Company Productions in 2008 ==
- ano natsu, shonen ha ita, 2008
- Julius Caesar, 2008
- Half Life, 2008
- A Christmas Carol, 2008
- The Nun, 2008
- Flowers for Algernon, 2008
