= Tsuneari Fukuda =

Japanese dramatist, translator, and literary critic

- 福田 恆存
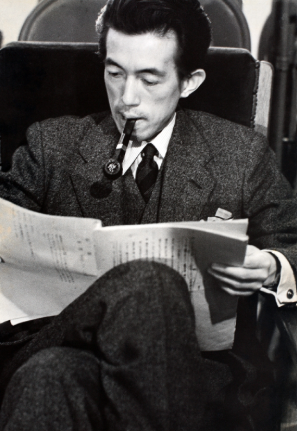
- Fukuda in 1955
- Born: 25 August 1912: Hongō, Tokyo; Empire of Japan
- Died: 20 November 1994 (aged 82): Ōiso, Kanagawa; Japan
- Other name: Kōson Fukuda
- Education: Tokyo Imperial University
- Occupations: Playwright; Translator; Literary critic
- Organisations: Bungakuza; Kumo; Subaru
- Spouse: Tsurue Nishimoto (m. 1945)
- Children: Kanau Fukuda; Hayaru Fukuda

Tsuneari Fukuda (Note: Japanese: 福田 恆存, romanised: Fukuda Tsuneari; also known as Kōson, from the on'yomi reading of his given name.) (25 August 1912 – 20 November 1994) was a Japanese playwright, translator, literary critic and public intellectual.

Born in Tokyo to a working-class family, Fukuda read English literature at Tokyo Imperial University. A scholar of D. H. Lawrence, he found his voice as a critic by contributing to literary magazines. Interested in theatre from a young age, Fukuda became associated with the shingeki genre of contemporary theatre, writing and producing numerous original plays, including The Man Who Stroked the Dragon (1952) and The Fuhrer is Still Alive! (1970), for which he was awarded the Yomiuri Prize and Grand Prize for Japanese Literature respectively. From the 1950s, he began a life-long endeavour to translate William Shakespeare's work into Japanese. He staged successful productions of these translations, starting with Hamlet in 1955, which set off a Shakespeare boom in Japan. Originally associated with the Bungakuza theatre company, he later broke away to found the Kumo and Subaru companies in 1963 and 1975 respectively.

A contributor to popular magazines such as Bungei Shunjū, Chūō Kōron, and Shokun!, Fukuda became well-known to the Japanese public as a conservative intellectual from the 1950s. He opposed the post-war Japanese script reform, and was awarded another Yomiuri Prize for his book on the subject, My Japanese Language Classroom (1960). He criticised left-wing movements, such as the Anpo protests, and questioned the dominance of pacifism in post-war Japan. A supporter of individual liberty and freedom of expression, he rejected the politicisation of art, and expressed doubts about Japanese modernisation. From 1969, he began teaching at Kyoto Sangyo University, and in 1981, he became a member of the Japan Art Academy. After suffering more than a decade of declining health, he died at Ōiso in Kanagawa Prefecture in 1994.

== Early life ==
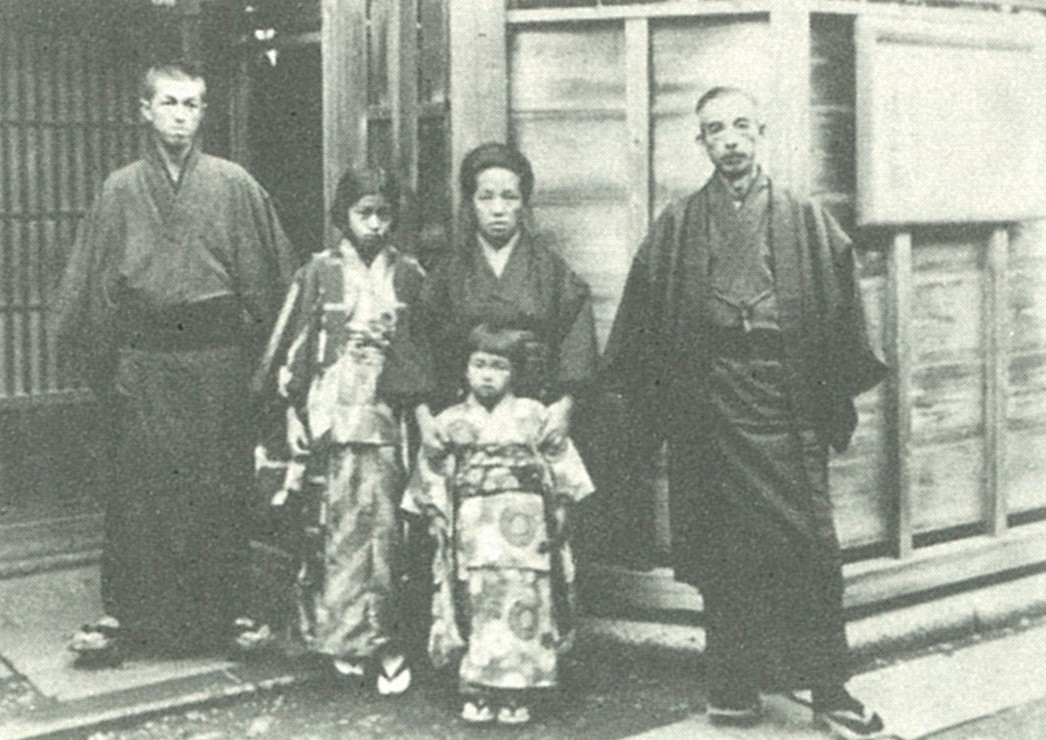
From the left: Fukuda, his sister Taeko, mother Masa, sister Nobuko, and father Kōshirō – taken during Fukuda's time at Urawa High School (1930–1933)

Tsuneari Fukuda was born to Kōshirō and Masa Fukuda on 25 August 1912 in the Hongō ward of Tokyo, the first of five children. While Fukuda's parents received limited formal education, his father, Kōshirō was able to acquire white-collar work as a salaryman at the Tokyo Electric Light Company through self-study, and was also a calligrapher. Fukuda's given name "Tsuneari" (恆存) was chosen by novelist Shian Ishibashi, and originates from a passage in the works of Confucian philosopher Mencius. (Note: Jin Xin I: 人之有德慧術知者恆存乎疢疾 – Translated by James Legge: "Men who are possessed of intelligent virtue and prudence in affairs will generally be found to have been in sickness and troubles.") His mother Masa was fond of the theatre, and often took him to see kabuki and Noh plays from the age of three or four. From 1919, Fukuda attended the prestigious Kinka Primary School, where he received a liberal education that placed emphasis on independent learning. His studies were interrupted by the Great Kantō Earthquake in September 1923, which destroyed his home and much of Tokyo. He was evacuated to the countryside, and did not return to school until March 1924. Fukuda, whose family was of working-class origins, felt isolated by his privileged peers. The gap between the progressive academic environment and his conservative homelife signified his intellectual isolation, a trait that would come to define Fukuda.

From 1925, he attended Tokyo No. 2 Junior High School, which was also known for liberal education. In 1930, he was admitted to the elite Urawa High School in Saitama Prefecture, where he enrolled in a humanities and English language course. The school was enveloped in a wave of left-wing student activism taking place across Japan at that time, but Fukuda never participated. During his high-school years, he developed an interest in literature and drama, and was particularly drawn to the works of Hardy and Shakespeare. In an article published in the school newspaper, Fukuda criticised the politicisation of art in the then popular shingeki theatrical genre, which was often used as a vehicle for leftist thought. Around this time, he wrote his first play, called Aru machi no hito (或る街の人), and submitted it to a new playhouse called Tsukiji-za run by shingeki actor Kyōsuke Tomoda. It received honourable mention, but was never performed.

In 1933, he matriculated at Tokyo Imperial University, where he read English literature, graduating in 1936. His thesis, which was written in English, was entitled "Moral Problems in D. H. Lawrence". In the paper, Fukuda used works such as Lady Chatterley's Lover and Sons and Lovers to examine individualistic, modern man's capability for love. The whereabouts of this text are unknown. During his years at university, Fukuda worked as a private teacher to support his family, as his father had fallen into financial difficulties. Living at home, away from the intellectual safe space of the university dormitories, Fukuda retained a willingness to learn from everyday people that was rare in Shōwa-era intellectuals.

== Before and during the Second World War ==
During his graduation year, Fukuda underwent a medical exam to evaluate his suitability for conscription, which found him to be of a weak constitution. He was thus granted an exemption from military service. With the Great Depression in full swing, Fukuda was unable to secure full-time employment after completing university, and turned to part-time work for sustenance. In 1937, he enrolled in an English literature postgraduate course at Tokyo Imperial University; during this time, he wrote his first literary criticism of Shakespeare's Macbeth, and began contributing to literary magazines. He submitted an article on Riichi Yokomitsu to one such magazine, Kōdō bungaku, which was published in its February 1937 issue. In May 1938, he found work as a junior high school English teacher at Kakegawa in Shizuoka Prefecture. He quit in 1939 after objecting to the head teacher's practice of admitting talented baseball players for their athletic ability alone.

After returning to Tokyo, Fukuda was contacted by his junior high-school teacher, the linguist Minoru Nishio, who offered him a job as the editor of a new humanities magazine called Keisei. He accepted, and worked for the magazine until July 1940, when it went out of print due to a wartime paper shortage. He then worked on a criticism of Ryūnosuke Akutagawa, which was published in 1941, and the first time he was paid for his written work. During the same year, he also published a translation of D.H. Lawrence's Apocalypse.

Fukuda was again approached by Nishio during 1941. This time, he was offered a position in the newly founded Society for the Promotion of Japanese Language Education (日本語教育振興会, Nihongo kyōiku shinkō-kai), an extra-departmental body of the Ministry of Education that was established in August 1941. The organisation, which aimed to supervise Japanese language education in Japan's colonies, employed Fukuda as the chief editor and publisher of its journal Nihongo. As part of his duties, he left Japan for the first time to participate in a two-month long tour of Manchuria, Mongolia, and northern and central China from September to December 1942.

Fukuda attended a meeting of the Patriotic Association for Japanese Literature in March 1943. The organisation had been established by the Cabinet Intelligence Bureau in 1940 to monitor the activities of literary figures. At the meeting, he made remarks that were subtly critical of the military leadership, citing the emotional experience of visiting the Russo-Japanese War battlefield of Hill 203 at Port Arthur, where many Japanese died. Ken'ichi Yoshida, a literary scholar who also attended the meeting, recounted later that Fukuda's remarks were "one of the very few examples of courageous speech I heard during the war". In June 1943, Ken Hirano, who then worked at the Cabinet Intelligence Bureau, approached Fukuda about serving as his successor at the agency. Fukuda, who was critical of the perversion of culture by war-time politics, declined. He continued to contribute to magazines such as Shinchō, using complex diction to attempt to evade censorship.

Fukuda resigned from his post at the Society for the Promotion of Japanese Language Education in spring 1944. On invitation from Ikutarō Shimizu, Fukuda joined the Japan Pacific Association, and was assigned to the Department of American Studies. He worked on creating a chronological history of the United States, and also on a translation of Part III of Ève Curie's Journey Among Warriors, which was later suppressed by the Cabinet Intelligence Bureau. Fukuda, who married in January 1945, resigned in March to focus on building a bomb shelter for his wife and parents. His home was destroyed in an air raid in May, after which his family evacuated to Shizuoka Prefecture with the help of one of his former students from Kakegawa Junior High School. Fukuda himself remained in Tokyo, and started teaching at Tokyo Woman's Christian University in June, before fleeing to Kanagawa Prefecture after Japan's defeat in August.

== In the immediate post-war period ==
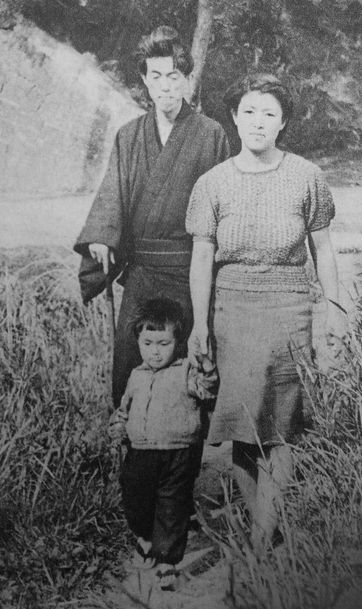
Fukuda with his wife Tsurue, and son, Kanau in 1948

Fukuda was reunited with his family in February 1946. They settled at Ōiso in Kanagawa Prefecture. With the war over, Fukuda began a new career as a "post-war critic", uniquely uncoloured by the ideologies of militarism or Marxism. At the invitation of Ikutarō Shimizu, Fukuda joined the Twentieth Century Research Institute (二十世紀研究所, nijusseiki kenkyūjo) in 1946. A group of public intellectuals devoted to the promotion of the study of the social sciences and philosophy that was founded that year, its primary activity was the holding of a series of public lectures. Other members included political scientist Masao Maruyama, economist Kazuo Ōkōchi and jurist Takeyoshi Kawashima.

In the post-defeat debate over responsibility for the Second World War, Fukuda rejected Masao Maruyama's prominent theory that the Japanese people's inability to resist authoritarianism was caused by their lack of a "modern ego" independent of the kokutai, or because of the lack of an ideological framework to deconstruct imperialism. Maruyama argued that, in pre-war Japan, the kokutai had a psychological or magical control over the Japanese people. By contrast, Fukuda argued that the Japanese people lacked the physical means to resist the violence of the state. He believed that humanity was flawed, essentially rooted in the physical egoism, and that no psychological means could be used to defeat brute force, saying: "It is impossible to expect ordinary people to be heroes; I do not have the courage to face that sort of state authority and continue a fruitless existence." Whereas leftist thinkers such as Hideo Odagiri believed that democratisation would require the Japanese people to overcome physical egoism and become "modern" individuals with strong ideals, Fukuda believed that egoism was a critical element of humanity that had to be balanced with the psyche. He issued a defence of the Japanese people, whom he said held a point of view that was "Japanese", not "pre-modern" or "backward" as asserted by Maruyama. Fukuda expressed hope for a revolution to bring about the democratisation of Japan, but he believed that this should originate from the people, not the intelligentsia.

He was particularly critical of the tendency for progressive intellectuals to use "self-criticism" to justify their superiority to the masses, arguing that practising such criticism was not a licence to criticise others, and did not absolve them of responsibility for their failure to resist the pre-war state. Fukuda posited that the intellectual class were just as complicit in this failure as the common people and the state, an unprecedented argument at the time. Fukuda's resistance to the idea that the common people needed to break free from egoism to become truly democratic also appeared in his writings on proletarian literature, which he said only served to "praise intellectuals who sacrifice themselves in the name of the liberation of the workers" in a form of what he called "puritan idealism". When Ken Hirano invited Fukuda join the Kindai Bungaku literary magazine, his participation was blocked by Shūgo Honda, who objected to Fukuda's criticism of proletarian literature in a February 1947 Shinchō article called "In the Name of Man" (人間の名において, Ningen no na ni oite). In his defence of the egoism of the common man, Fukuda drew particular ire from communists, such as Kenji Miyamoto, who referred to him as a "petty bourgeois critic", and also from other critics such as Shūichi Katō who named him a "petty bourgeois reactionary".

During the 1946–1947 "politics and literature debate" (政治と文学論争, Seiji to bungaku ronsō), a discourse between leftist literary critics associated with the magazines Kindai Bungaku and Shin Nihon Bungaku about the role of literature in relation to politics, Fukuda argued for a clear dividing line between the two. In The One Sheep and the Ninety-Nine (一匹と九十九匹と, Ippiki to kyūjūhiki to), which was published in March 1947, and known as one of Fukuda's most significant works, he used the biblical Parable of the Lost Sheep to make his argument. Fukuda posits that each human possesses both collective (the ninety-nine sheep) and individual (the one lost sheep) egos. Politics, Fukuda says, serve the collective ego, while literature serves to save the individual. He lamented that "whether from the right or the left, the current tendency is to destroy the individual in the name of society". Literature, Fukuda said, should not serve politics nor become a means to effect a political end. Instead, Fukuda argued, the inherent contradiction between the human desires to both belong to a group and be an individual should be accepted, allowing for both politics and literature to serve their own, independent roles.

Fukuda wrote the first published literary criticism of Osamu Dazai in 1948, which appeared in the Gunzo magazine. He was a founding member of the Hachi-no-Ki Kai, a literary circle formed during the same year, which included Ken'ichi Yoshida, Mitsuo Nakamura, Shōhei Ōoka, and Yukio Mishima. Fukuda released the metatheatrical play The Last Trump Card (最後の切札, Saigo no kirifuda) in September 1948. In 1949, Fukuda joined the Albion Club, a group devoted to the study of British culture founded the same year. He contributed a criticism of David Garnett to the first issue of the group's magazine, Albion. He also published a book, On Western Authors (西欧作家論, Seiō sakkaron), which rejected Japanese modernisation as "false" and reproducing the west's mistakes. In the work, he praised Garnett for his avoidance of what he called the modern tendency toward "excessive individualism". In March 1949, he published a novel, The Horatio Diary (ホレイショー日記, Horeishō nikki). The novel is centred upon the life of David Jones, a fictional Hamlet actor and director at the Old Vic in London during the Second World War, who later ends up playing Horatio. In the novel, Fukuda, who had yet to visit Britain, constructed the London theatrical scene of his imagination, and touches on the theme of humanity's struggle to act against the madness of war.

== Dramatic work and trip to America and Europe ==
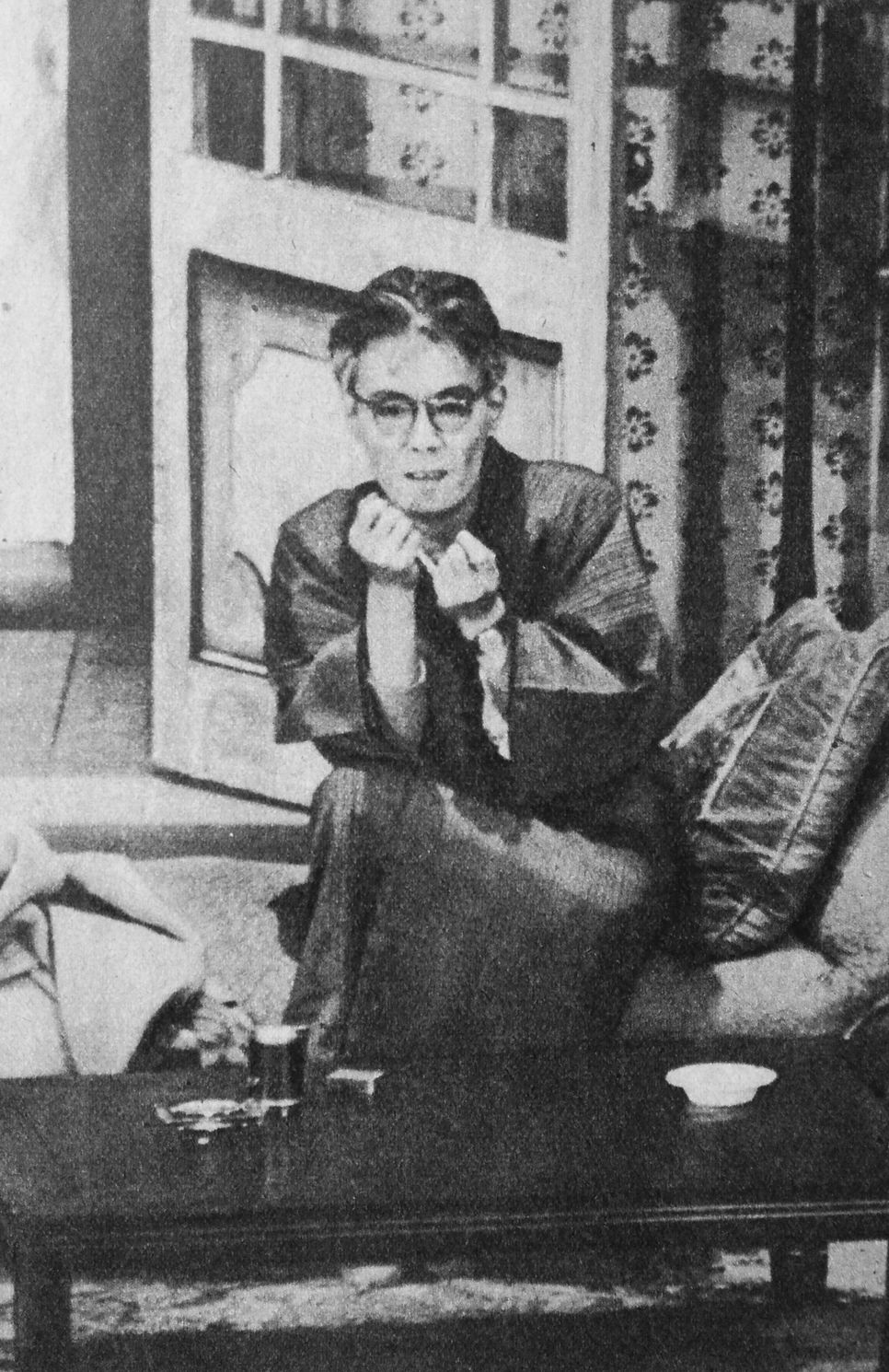
Hiroshi Akutagawa in Fukuda's The Man Who Stroked the Dragon, November 1952

Fukuda's career reoriented towards drama in the 1950s. In his 1950 book What is Art? (藝術とはなにか, Geijutsu to wa nani ka), Fukuda argues that humans are fundamentally empty, and that only through performance, through becoming someone else, can they truly live. He expressed dissatisfaction with the dominance of empirical science, which he said acknowledges only those things present in the material world, and rejects the process of creating a fiction that expands beyond reality. Fukuda argues that, because of this, modernity had sapped humanity's lifeforce and creativity. He goes on to argue that traditional theatre allows the audience to project themselves into another world, triggering catharsis. Contemporary theatre, he says, fails in this function, because of its emphasis on realism.

Fukuda's next drama, Typhoon Kitty (キティ颱風, Kiti taifū) was also published in 1950. A parody of Chekhov's The Cherry Orchard, it is considered one of his best satires. Fukuda submitted the play to shingeki grandee Kunio Kishida, who lauded the work. On Kishida's recommendation, the play was performed by the Bungakuza theatre company from March 1950. It was nominated for the Yomiuri Prize, and also praised by Yukio Mishima, who said, "five years after the war, the first contemporary play in the true meaning of the word has finally arrived". Fukuda continued to release new plays, starting with The Siege (堅塁奪取, Kenrui dasshu) in 1950, which was performed at the Bungakuza's Atelier in a double billing with Mishima's Kantan (邯鄲). Together with Hiroshi Akutagawa and Sei'ichi Yashiro, Fukuda and Mishima formed the heart of an anti-realist branch of shingeki centred on the Atelier. They were also founding members of the Kumo no Kai, a group of writers and dramatists formed under Kishida's leadership in August 1950.

Fukuda was asked to give testimony as an expert witness in the obscenity trial of D.H. Lawrence's Lady Chatterley's Lover in May 1951. A Japanese translation of the book by Sei Itō was published in 1950, but was then confiscated by police on grounds of obscenity. During the trial, Fukuda offered a defence of Lawrence, stating that the book was by no means obscene, and that it was of a superior moral character when compared with most Japanese novels. Despite his testimony, the defendants ultimately lost the case. In 1952, Fukuda formally joined the Bungakuza, and received his first Yomiuri Prize for the play The Man Who Stroked the Dragon (龍を撫でた男, Ryū o nadeta otoko). Known as Fukuda's "masterpiece", it was inspired by T. S. Eliot's The Cocktail Party, and queries whether true love is possible in a godless country.

In 1953, Fukuda was invited to travel to America and Europe by the Rockefeller Foundation, after receiving a recommendation from Shiho Sakanishi, his former supervisor at the Japan Pacific Association. During this trip, which extended from September 1953 to September 1954, he was enthralled by performances of Shakespeare at the Old Vic in London, particularly Michael Benthall's production of Hamlet, which he viewed as a realisation of his own internal dramatic beliefs. The trip had a great impact on Fukuda; he came to believe that Japanese westernisation was hollow, because it lacked the spiritual, Christian grounding of tradition that was present in the west. After returning to Japan, Fukuda started translating Shakespeare's repertoire into Japanese, which became a life-long endeavour, and putting on performances reminiscent of what he had seen at the Old Vic. He saw Shakespeare's plays as a means to overcome modernity and the alienation of the individual in modern society, believing that their ritualistic nature could help facilitate the creation of communal bonds.

== Pacifism controversy ==
Upon Fukuda's return to Japan, the chief editor of Chūō Kōron, Hōji Shimanaka, asked him to write an article about his travels abroad. Fukuda declined, instead offering to write on an alternative subject of his choosing. Shimanaka was shocked by the essay Fukuda eventually produced. Originally titled "Questioning Pacifism" (平和論に対する疑問, Heiwaron ni tai suru gimon), its content was watered down by editorial staff before release. Retitled "Questions About the Advancement of Pacifism" (平和論の進め方についての疑問, Heiwaron no susumekata ni tsuite no gimon), it was published in December 1954 at Shimanaka's personal discretion. In the essay, Fukuda challenged the common conception of the Cold War then put forth by Japanese progressives: that the communist Soviet Union represented peace, while capitalist America was a warmonger, and that Japan should co-operate with the Second World to achieve disarmament and neutrality. According to Tsuyoshi Kawakubo, criticising this conception had been considered taboo in the 1950s Japanese media. Fukuda argued that the anti-nuclear pacifist ideology, rooted in Japan's suffering of the first atomic bombings during the Second World War, amounted to an abrogation of responsibility, rendering security issues unsolvable and negatively impacting Japan's relationship with the United States. Refusing to engage with the government, Fukuda said, was effectively a means to allow the activists to maintain their ideological purity and avoid having to actually do the work of addressing the problems of the day, in what he called the "disease of self-denial".

The essay received scathing criticism, and shocked pacifist activists. Shimanaka was warned that featuring essays like Fukuda's would hurt his magazine's sales. Fukuda, who had just returned from his year-long trip in America and Europe paid for by the Rockefeller Foundation, was accused of having written the article as a quid pro quo. Takeshi Shinmura wrote in The Mainichi Shimbun that Fukuda's viewpoint "was the sort of anti-communist ideology frequently found among Japanese, not the healthy, conventional wisdom held by most scholars of American and European literature". Chūō Kōron published Fukuda's reply to this criticism in February 1955, wherein he argued that his remarks had only been deemed problematic because, while many Japanese shared his opinion, it had become difficult to express such thoughts in contemporary Japan. What was needed, said Fukuda, was a space for free, open debate, stating "freedom of expression does not mean the freedom to express progressive thoughts alone". Three months later, the original essay and Fukuda's reply were republished as a book by Bungeishunjū under the original title, Questioning Pacifism. Fukuda was labelled a "dangerous thinker" and a "conservative reactionary" for the arguments he made in these works. Fukuda later said that, as a result, he was "ostracised" by the broader community of intellectuals and journalists. The controversy even had an impact on his dramatic work. Both the Mingei and Haiyuza theatre companies, which had previously performed Fukuda's plays, abandoned further collaboration.

== Shakespeare productions and My Japanese Language Classroom ==
Fukuda completed his first Shakespeare translation, Hamlet, in May 1955. Performed at the Bungakuza, it was the first post-war production of Hamlet in Japan, and starred Hiroshi Akutagawa as Hamlet. The production was distinguished as a departure from shingeki norms, with its absence of realism, and lively, dynamic movement. Fukuda characterised Hamlet as a contemporary drama that addressed the problems of modernity. Unlike Shōyō Tsubouchi's earlier Shakespeare translations, which were written as kabuki plays, Fukuda used contemporary western drama as a model, though he also made conscious use of the traditional Japanese seven–five syllable metre. He rejected the tendency to "iron out" contradictions in the text, which he argued were a fundamental part of Shakespeare's work, and offered disdain for the idea that his plays should be used a venue for conveying the director's own message. While Hamlet had previously been viewed as "old-fashioned", Fukuda's production was a great success, and marked the start of a post-war Shakespeare boom in Japan. Fukuda withdrew from the Bungakuza in March 1956, but continued to collaborate with the company in a freelance capacity. His original plays, such as the tragedy Akechi Mitsuhide in 1957, which starred kabuki actor Matsumoto Kōshirō, continued to be performed by the company. That play combined Japanese historical figure Akechi Mitsuhide's story with Shakespeare's Macbeth in a radical mixing of kabuki and shingeki that aimed to "transplant Shakespeare to Japanese soil".

Fukuda was an opponent of the post-war Japanese script reforms, such as the replacement of historical kana orthography with a new, phonocentric orthography, and the implementation of restrictions on the use of and simplification of Chinese characters. These changes, which were adopted after a push by the American military administration in Japan to replace the Japanese writing system with the Latin alphabet, were viewed by Fukuda as the destruction of Japanese culture. He continued to use the pre-war orthography in his own writing. During 1958, Fukuda published a series of articles on the subject in Koe (聲), a magazine produced by Hachi-no-Ki Kai members. These articles were later compiled into a Yomiuri Prize–winning book, My Japanese Language Classroom (私の國語敎室, Watashi no kokugokyōshitsu), which was released in 1960. In the book, Fukuda argues that words are not mere "tools for the transmission of culture", but culture itself, rejecting rationalist pretexts for reform with the riposte: "Does writing exist for the typewriter, or the typewriter for writing?" Fukuda was also a founding member of the Council for Language Matters (國語問題協議會, Kokugo mondai kyōgikai), a group established in 1959 to resist the reform-driven National Language Council. Fukuda's efforts contributed to the reconsideration of the reform programme, and in 1966, the Ministry of Education announced that it was abandoning long-standing plans to eliminate the use of Chinese characters in the Japanese language. My Japanese Language Classroom came to be considered a "bible" for proponents of the pre-war orthography.

Fukuda also continued to translate Shakespeare's work, completing all of the major plays by 1966. These translations were emblematic of Fukuda's belief in "speech drama", and placed emphasis on the theatricality of language, with "sharp, rhythmical" wordings optimised for performance. At the Bungakuza, he directed productions of Macbeth in 1958, Othello in 1960, and Julius Caesar in 1961. He also continued to write political commentary, such as the 1960 essay "Return to Common Sense" (常識に還れ, Jōshiki ni kaere), which was published in Shinchō. In the essay, Fukuda criticised the Anpo protests against the US–Japan security treaty. He argued that peace could not be maintained without force, rejecting Masao Maruyama's proposal of disarmament and neutrality for Japan.

== Institute for Dramatic Arts ==
Shingeki was heavily impacted by the Anpo protests. Most shingeki associates participated in the demonstrations, and 34 shingeki groups issued a joint statement in opposition to the security treaty. The Bungakuza was considered less political than other troupes, but in the wake of the protests, its leadership decided to participate in a tour of communist China in 1961. During the tour, Kaoru Morimoto's play A Woman's Life was modified to accommodate Chinese ideological demands, incensing junior members. The dispute came to a head in January 1963, when over 20 actors and dramatists who objected to the increasing politicisation of the Bungakuza broke away to form the Kumo Theatre Company under Fukuda's direction. Fukuda served as chairman of the Institute for Dramatic Arts (DARTS), an organisation founded in May 1963 to facilitate Kumo's activities. Its launch was accompanied by the release of a manifesto in which Fukuda declared that shingeki had "lost all of its ideals, spirit and enthusiasm", and that the institute would seek to "break out of the shell which hinders the modern theatre today and to start completely afresh". For Fukuda, the institute was a means to push back against increasing commercialism and politicisation in Japanese theatre.

Kumo's first production was Fukuda's A Midsummer Night's Dream. In 1964, it performed Fukuda's translation of Richard III, starring kabuki actor Nakamura Kanzaburō XVII as the title character. Nakamura's mastery of soliloquy, common in kabuki, but rare in realism-dominated shingeki, was critical to the play's success. Fukuda was invited to America to attend the national celebration of the 400th anniversary of Shakespeare's birth in June 1964, during which he viewed a performance of Hamlet at the American Shakespeare Festival Theatre in Stratford, Connecticut.

In 1965, Fukuda organised Kumo's production of Romeo and Juliet. In a first for Japanese Shakespeare, Fukuda invited former Old Vic director Michael Benthall to Japan to direct the production. Benthall directed the play without understanding Japanese, something that would later become common in Japanese theatre. In the same year, Kumo's sister troupe, the Keyaki Theatre Company was founded. Whereas Kumo focused primarily on literary plays, Keyaki performed popular, entertainment-focused works. Its first production was Fukuda's The Billionairess (億萬長者夫人, Okuman chōja fujin), an adaptation of George Bernard Shaw's The Millionairess. Fukuda also wrote two plays for the Shiki Theatre Company: a 1968 satire of the Kin Kirō incident, Wakatte tamaru ka!, and the 1970 comedy The Fuhrer is Still Alive! (総統いまだ死せず, Sōtō imada shisezu). The latter play was lauded with the Grand Prize for Japanese Literature, and was subsequently translated into English by J. Thomas Rimer for performance by the Milwaukee Repertory Theatre in 1983. Fukuda was a founding member of the conservative intellectual group Japan Cultural Congress, established in June 1968. He contributed to Shokun!, a magazine published by Bungeishunjū that launched with the Congress's support in 1969. From April 1969, Fukuda began teaching at Kyoto Sangyo University.

Kumo broke up due to creative differences in 1975. Fukuda merged the rump Kumo with Keyaki to form Subaru, a new troupe under the Institute for Dramatic Arts banner. Its first production was Albert Camus' Caligula in 1976. Fukuda was a close friend of South Korean president Park Chung Hee, and perhaps because of this, Subaru was invited to Seoul to perform Terence Rattigan's The Deep Blue Sea in 1979. On 26 October, the night before the performance, Park was assassinated. Fukuda, who was in Seoul for the performance, wept alone in his hotel room, and later wrote a eulogy of Park that was published in Bungei Shunjū in January 1980.

== Later life ==
From 1980, Fukuda's health began to decline; he suffered repeated bouts of pneumonia and a stroke. He was awarded the Kikuchi Kan Prize in September 1980, the Japan Art Academy Prize in June 1981, and became an academy member in December 1981. In spite of his health issues, Fukuda continued to release publications, including the textbook An Introduction to Drama (演劇入門, Engeki nyūmon) in 1981, his collected works in 1987, and his collected translations in 1992. He retired from Kyoto Sangyo University in 1983, and was awarded the Order of the Rising Sun, 3rd Class, in 1986. Fukuda resigned from his post as chairman of the Institute of Dramatic Arts in 1988. He died at Ōiso from complications related to pneumonia on 20 November 1994.

== Political beliefs ==
From the 1950s, Fukuda wrote political commentary in addition to his literary and dramatic work. A contributor to magazines such as Bungei Shunjū, Chūō Kōron, Shokun!, and Jiyū, he became known as a significant conservative voice for his critiques of pacifism and Japanese left-wing movements, which are more familiar to the Japanese public than his artistic achievements. Referred to by the epithets "rhetorician" and "magician of argument" (論争の手品師, ronsō no tejinashi), Fukuda frequently used cognitive reframing in his discourse. He stressed the importance of freedom of expression, and considered himself an advocate of individual liberty. As a dramatist, he believed that humans have an inherent desire for ontological security, namely, to play a necessary role in society. He rejected progressive conceptions of cosmopolitan individualism for cutting individuals off from their cultural and historical context through rationalisation and abstraction. He argued that the western values upheld by the Japanese left arose in a particular context that was foreign to Japan, and that it was necessary to reclaim a "natural" Japanese culture, even if only in a mythological sense. At the same time, Fukuda declared himself an "unlicensed Catholic", argued that Christianity curbed the excesses of modernisation in the west, and that Japan's lack of such spiritual grounding had led to the exaggeration of its negative effects.

While Fukuda came to be thought of as a "conservative" thinker, he rejected the label. In My View on Conservatism (私の保守主義観, Watashi no hoshu shugi kan), Fukuda wrote that, though his lifestyle and thought process were conservative, he did not think of himself as a "conservative", and argued that there could be no ideology of "conservatism", only a conservative "attitude". He identified the difference between reformist and conservative thinking as one of language: while reformist ideologies attempt to provide a "universal language" to convince the masses, the act of being "conservative" rejects the concept of universality. For Fukuda, to bandy about the word "conservative" as reformists do would be a contradiction in terms, as it would imply a universal "conservatism" that could be readily defined. Conservatives, wrote Fukuda, should convince others with their attitude, not by trying to make them submit to an ideology. Fukuda argues that to be conservative is to be irrational, to accept the fallibility of humanity and its imperfections, and to believe in something greater than the self, or what Fukuda refers to as the "whole". The reason that holders of a conservative attitude express doubt about any small change, reform, or progress, Fukuda says, is precisely because of this lack of confidence in humanity's ability to foresee the potential impact of any change.

== Family ==
Fukuda was introduced to Tsurue Nishimoto by his former junior high school teacher, Minoru Nishio. They married in January 1945, and had two sons: Kanau Fukuda in 1946, and Hayaru Fukuda in 1948.

== Selected works ==
=== Plays ===
- The Last Trump Card (最後の切札, Saigo no kirifuda), 1948
- Typhoon Kitty (キティ颱風, Kiti taifū), 1950
- The Lady of Musashino (武蔵野夫人, Musashino fujin), 1951
- The Man Who Stroked the Dragon (龍を撫でた男, Ryū o nadeta otoko), 1952
- Wakatte tamaru ka! (解ってたまるか!), 1968
- The Fuhrer is Still Alive! (総統いまだ死せず, Sōtō imada shisezu), 1970

=== Criticism ===
- The Writer's Attitude (作家の態度, Sakka no taido), 1947
- The Fate of Modernity (近代の宿命, Kindai no shukumei), 1947
- Sense of Balance (平衡感覺, Heikō kankaku), 1947
- Dazai and Akutagawa (太宰と芥川, Dazai to Akutagawa), 1948
- The White-Painted Grave (白く塗りたる墓, Shiroku nuritaru haka), 1948
- Contemporary Authors (現代作家, Gendai sakka), 1949
- On Wisdom (知慧について, Chie ni tsuite), 1949
- On Western Authors (西歐作家論, Seiō sakka ron), 1949
- The Mindset of Negation (否定の精神, Hitei no seishin), 1949
- The Fate of the Novel (小説の運命, Shōsetsu no unmei), 1949
- What Is Art? (藝術とはなにか, Geijutsu to wa nani ka), 1950
- On Authors (作家論, Sakka ron), 1952–1953
- D. H. Lawrence's View on Marriage: Final Defence in the Chatterley Trial (ロレンスの結婚觀―チャタレイ裁判最終辯論, Rōrensu no kekkon kan: Chatarei saiban saishū benron), 1953
- Questioning Pacifism (平和論にたいする疑問, Heiwa ron ni taisuru gimon), 1955
- What Is Culture? (文化とはなにか, Bunka to wa nani ka), 1955
- Intellectual Temperament (インテリかたぎ, Interi katagi), 1955
- Man: This Dramatic Being (人間・この劇的なるもの, Ningen: kono gekiteki naru mono), 1956
- A Guide to Happiness (幸福への手帖, Kōfuku e no techō), 1956
  - Retitled My Theory of Happiness (私の幸福論, Watashi no kōfuku ron), 1979
- On War and Peace (戰爭と平和と, Sensō to heiwa to), 1957
- An Uncomfortable Chair (坐り心地の惡い椅子, Suwari gokochi no warui isu), 1957
- Invitation to the Theatre (劇場への招待, Gekijō e no shōtai), 1957
- My Theatre White Paper (私の演劇白書, Watashi no engeki hakusho), 1958
- My Romance Classroom (私の戀愛教室, Watashi no ren'ai kyōshitsu), 1959
- The Critic's Notebook (批評家の手帖, Hihyō-ka no techō), Shinchōsha, 1959
- Return to Common Sense (常識に還れ, Jōshiki ni kaere), 1960
- My Japanese Language Classroom (私の國語敎室, Watashi no kokugo kyōshitsu), 1960
- An Encouragement of Debate (論爭のすすめ, Ronsō no susume), Shinchōsha, 1961
- My Drama Classroom (私の演劇敎室, Watashi no engeki kyōshitsu), 1961
- The Devil of Modernity (現代の惡魔, Gendai no akuma), 1962
- The Idea of Peace (平和の理念, Heiwa no rinen), 1965
- Thinking of Japan (日本を思ふ, Nihon o omou), 1969
- On the Meaning of Life (生き甲斐といふ事, Ikigai to iu koto), 1971
- On Freedom of Expression (言論の自由といふ事, Genron no jiyū to iu koto), 1973
- The Future of Japan: An Appeal to the Japanese and American Peoples (日米兩國民に訴へる 日本の将来, Nichibei ryōkokumin ni uttaeru: Nihon no shōrai), 1974
- Knowing and Doing (知る事と行ふ事と, Shiru koto to okonau koto to), 1976
- Lines and Movement: For Actors and Audience (せりふと動き 役者と観客のために, Serifu to ugoki: yakusha to kankyaku no tame ni), 1979
- What Is Education? (教育とは何か, Kyōiku to wa nani ka), 1980
- My History of Britain (私の英國史, Watashi no Eikoku shi), 1980
- A Cultureless Cultural Nation (文化なき文化國家, Bunka naki bunka kokka), 1980
- An Introduction to Drama (演劇入門, Engeki nyūmon), 1981
- What I Want to Question (問ひ質したき事ども, Toitadasitaki koto domo), 1981

=== Translations ===
- William Shakespeare
  - Hamlet, 1955
  - Macbeth, 1955
  - The Taming of the Shrew, 1955
  - Richard III, 1956
  - A Midsummer Night's Dream, 1956
  - The Merchant of Venice, 1960
  - Julius Caesar, 1960
  - Othello, 1960
  - Antony and Cleopatra, 1961
  - Much Ado About Nothing, 1962
  - King Lear, 1962
  - As You Like It, 1963
  - Romeo and Juliet, 1964
  - The Tempest, 1965
  - Coriolanus, 1971
  - Twelfth Night, 1972
  - Titus Andronicus, 1977
  - Richard II, 1986
- Ernest Hemingway
  - The Old Man and the Sea, 1953
- T. S. Eliot
  - The Cocktail Party, 1951
- Oscar Wilde
  - De Profundis, 1954
  - Salome, 1958
  - The Picture of Dorian Gray, 1962
- D. H. Lawrence
  - Apocalypse, 1941
  - Women in Love, 1952

=== Compilations ===
- The Complete Works of Tsuneari Fukuda (福田恆存全集, Fukuda Tsuneari zenshū), 1987–1988
- The Complete Translations of Tsuneari Fukuda (福田恆存翻訳全集, Fukuda Tsuneari honyaku zenshū), 1992–1993
