= Shiho (given name) =

- Gender: Female

Origin
- Origin: Japanese
- Meaning: Different meanings depending on the kanji used

Shiho (written: 志保, 志穂, 志穗, 志帆, 志歩, 史帆 or 詩穂) is a feminine Japanese given name. Notable people with the name include:

- Shiho (actress) (志保; born 1992), Japanese actress and model
- Shiho Akita (秋田 史帆; born 1990), Japanese professional tennis player
- Shiho Fujimura (藤村 志保; born 1939), Japanese actress
- Shiho Fujiwara (藤原 志保; born 1971), Japanese ice hockey player
- Shiho Fukada (深田 志穂), Japanese photojournalist
- Shiho Hisamatsu (久松 志保; born 1979), Japanese tennis player
- Shiho Ishizawa (石澤 志穂; born 1986), Japanese speed skater
- Shiho Kaneda (金田 志保; born 1965), Japanese former football player
- Shiho Katō (加藤 史帆; born 1998), Japanese idol
- Shiho Kawaragi (河原木 志穂; born 1976), Japanese voice actress and singer
- Shiho Kikuchi (菊池 志穂; born 1972), Japanese voice actress
- Shiho Kobayakawa (born 1999), Japanese field hockey player
- Shiho Kohata (高畑 志帆; born 1989), Japanese footballer
- Shiho Kokido (古城門 志帆; born 1990), Japanese voice actress
- Shiho Kusunose (楠瀬 志保; born 1969), Japanese speed skater
- Shiho Kuwaki (桑木 志帆; born 2003), Japanese professional golfer
- Shiho Nakaji (中路 紫帆; born 2000), Japanese artistic gymnast
- Shiho Nakashima (中島 志保; born 1978), Japanese snowboarder
- Shiho Niiyama (新山 志保; 1970–2000), Japanese voice actress
- Shiho Nishioka (西岡 詩穂; born 1989), Japanese fencer
- Shiho Ochi (越智 志帆; born 1984), Japanese musician
- Shiho Ogawa (小川 志保; born 1988), Japanese football player
- Shiho Ogawa (小河 詩朋; born 2003), Japanese footballer
- Shiho Onodera (小野寺 志保; born 1973), Japanese former football player
- Shiho Otsuka (大塚 志穂; born 1989), Japanese field hockey player
- Shiho Oyama (大山 志保; born 1977), Japanese female professional golfer
- Shiho Sakai (酒井 志穂; born 1990), Japanese swimmer
- Shiho Sakanishi (坂西 志保; 1896–1976), Japanese critic, essayist, academic, translator, author, and librarian
- Shiho Shimoyamada (下山田 志帆; born 1994), Japanese professional footballer
- Shiho Sugiura (杉浦 志保), Japanese manga artist
- Shiho Takano (高野 志穂; born 1979), Japanese actress
- Shiho Tanaka (田中 志穗; born 1992), Japanese badminton player
- Shiho Tanaka (judoka) (田中 志歩; born 1998), Japanese judoka
- Shiho Tomari (泊 志穂; born 1990), Japanese footballer
- Shiho Yano (矢野 志保; born 1976), Japanese model
- Shiho Yoshimura (吉村 志穂; born 1989), Japanese former volleyball player

== Fictional characters ==
- Shiho Munakata (宗像 詩帆), a character in the anime series My-HiME
- Shiho Miyano (宮野 志保), a character in the manga series Detective Conan
- Shiho Hinomori (日野森 志歩), a character from the video game Hatsune Miku: Colorful Stage!
- Shiho Izumi (泉 志帆), a character in the anime and manga series Whisper Me a Love Song
- Shiho Sannomiya (三宮 紫穂), a character in the manga series Zettai Karen Children
- Shiho Suzui (鈴井 志帆), a character in the video game Persona 5
- Shiho Ichimura (市村 しほ) from Odd Taxi
- Shiho Kitazawa (北沢 志保), a character from the idol game The Idolmaster Million Live!
