= Moomin (1969 TV series) =

1969 Japanese anime television series

- Image from the TV series displaying the main characters

ムーミン (Mūmin)
- Genre: Fantasy; Comedy
- Created by: Tove Jansson
- Anime television series
- Directed by: Masaaki Osumi (Eps 1-26); Noboru Ishiguro, Satoshi Dezaki, Ryosuke Takahashi, Rintaro (Eps 27–65)
- Written by: Tadaaki Yamazaki et al.
- Music by: Composer: Seiichirō Uno songwriter: Hisashi Inoue; Singer: Toshiko Fujita (opening/closing song: "Nē! Mūmin" (Hi, Moomin!))
- Studio: Zuiyo Enterprise; Tokyo Movie (Eps 1–26); Mushi Productions (Eps 27–65)
- Original network: Fuji TV
- Original run: October 5, 1969 – December 27, 1970
- Episodes: 65

Moomin (ムーミン, Mūmin) is a Japanese anime television series produced by Zuiyo Enterprise and animated by Tokyo Movie until episode 26 and by Mushi Production after episode 27. The series is loosely based on the Moomin books by the Finnish author Tove Jansson and was broadcast on Fuji Television from 1969 to 1970. A sequel series entitled Shin Muumin (lit. 'New Moomin') was later released in 1972. Jansson never approved of the series or its successor, due to their dramatic changes with the plots, overall atmosphere, and character personalities.

Because of this, the series saw only limited release outside Japan, in Taiwan and some others like United Kingdom. Also, the series has never been released in principle since 1990 including in Japan, when a new anime television series Moomin was released with the full involvement of Jansson herself.

The anime series is also the second entry, and the first in color, in what is now known as World Masterpiece Theater (Calpis Comic Theater at the time). Zuiyo Enterprise, would split in 1975 into Nippon Animation (which employed some of Zuiyo's animation production staff and continued with the World Masterpiece Theater franchise) and Zuiyo Company, Ltd.

== Summary ==
Moomintroll holding a rifle in the fifth episode of the series. This and other situations throughout the series displeased Jansson.

The anime series is notably different from the later anime television series Moomin, released in the early 1990s, which was translated into many languages, released in dozens of countries, and relies more on the original Moomin books and comic strips.

While the series itself was well-liked by the Japanese public as an adventurous and comedic series for boys, it was dramatically different in areas like the adaptation and overall atmosphere. For example, Moomintroll was portrayed more as an ordinary boy; while still friendly like in the books, he is somewhat ill-tempered, occasionally fighting or behaving slyly. This, along with elements such as Snork being a driver, common use of firearms, one scene in an early episode featuring characters getting drunk together at a bar, infuriated Jansson.

After Tokyo Movie's contract was cancelled, with Mushi Production taking over, the designs were changed accordingly and the series had episodes more faithful to the source material, which included the source's stories and points of mystery, horror, comedy and tragedy. Despite this, Jansson's consent was still not obtained and the program was ended after more than 60 episodes.

Since 1990, Moomin Characters, Ltd, which manages the Moomin copyrights, has not released this series to the public in principle.

== Production ==
In the 1960s, sports dramas and slapstick comedies were the mainstream of Japanese TV animation at that time. Therefore, Calpis Co., Ltd., the sponsor of the animated program in Fuji TV, wanted to offer a family-oriented animation that was distinctly different from those fields. At that time, "Moomin", which had just been imported from abroad as children's literature, caught their attention. And so the project was launched.

A short time later, the proposal was sent to Tove Jansson. Jansson's response was positive, so Shigeto Takahashi, a producer at Zuiyo Enterprise who was in charge of the project, decided to meet directly with Jansson to proceed with negotiations. Jansson suggested the following conditions for the production of the animation: no money, no machines, and no television to be featured in the series.

=== Development and pre-production ===
Tokyo Movie, now TMS Entertainment, was chosen to produce the animation.

Masaaki Osumi, who came from a puppet theater company, was chosen to be the director. Osumi, who was familiar with Moomin, initially thought the content was too static to be suitable for animation, but accepted the position.

The company hired Yasuo Otsuka as the animation director. He was considered to be one of Japan's foremost animators, and was an important mentor to Hayao Miyazaki. He considered the cuteness of movement and the roundness of his drawings to be important, and never used straight lines to draw characters such as the Moomins.

The initial meetings were confusing. Takahashi, who respected Jansson's opinions and aimed for a plot that was faithful to the original work, was at odds with the advertising agency, which aimed for a plot that did not respect Jansson's original work on the grounds that "the style as it is will not be popular in Japan." Osumi was invited by the advertising agency to a planning meeting, where he was surprised and frustrated by their inability to understand the spirit of the source material due to comments which included the suggestion of running a bullet train in the Moomin Valley. Osumi was dissatisfied and desired to quit, but was fascinated by the animation shown by Otsuka just before leaving the company, and reconsidered. Osumi later said of the participants in this meeting, "Perhaps, but they had not even read the original work and were only thinking about the character business." Later, the bullet train idea was rejected due to opposition from Osumi and others.

In making the animation, Osumi decided to base it on Moomin comic strips rather than the Jansson novels. The strips had a freer plot than the novels, and he thought that "the style of the comic would work as an animation". Therefore, Osumi claims that he did not create a plot that was different than the comic strip.

In the casting process, Kyōko Kishida was chosen to play Moomin because she once contributed a story about reading a Moomin novel in an essay she had written for a newspaper. Subsequently, the casting of other main characters was done according to Kisida's abilities, and stage actors and other actors with greater theatrical skills than the popular voice actors of the time were employed.

Hisashi Inoue, a distinguished novelist and dramatist, participated as a screenwriter.

At first, there were some complaints from the advertising agency that the story was too self-controlled. However, once the animation was actually broadcast, the response was more favorable than expected, especially since the sponsor, Calpis, approved of it, and the strong complaints receded.

=== Change of production company ===
When the broadcast began, Tokyo Movie and Zuiyo Enterprise asked Jansson to watch episode 7. This was to get her endorsement, however, she gave the episode a low rating and submitted a letter to the staff with a series of complaints and requests. Tokyo Movie ended production after episode 26 and exited the project, citing this letter from Jansson. But this reason was ostensible. The Moomin project was initially intended to be a low-budget production, but the animators and staff on site insisted on producing high-quality work, and as a result, the budget was far exceeded, and negotiations with the advertising agency for an increase in the budget were not agreed upon. Also, Due to its popularity with viewers, the number of broadcasts was suddenly increased from the planned number, but Tokyo Movie could not cope with this. For this reason, Tokyo Movie's upper management wanted to withdraw from the project and used Jansson's claims as an excuse to Zuiyo Enterprise, the sponsors, and the Fuji TV, who were willing to continue the program.

With the departure of Tokyo Movie from the project, Osumi and other key staff and animators were also dropped from the production. The animators on site were summoned by the president and informed of the sudden termination. They were disappointed, but also relieved. Yutaka Fujioka, who was in charge of the site and wanted the project to continue, was on a business trip that day and was angry when he heard the news of the termination the next day. However, the CEO had already made that decision, and it was too late. They were soon transferred to the Lupin the 3rd Part I: The Classic Adventures project.

Mushi Production became the animation production company from episode 27.

Episode 27 was greatly innovated and changed in response to Jansson's request, with the character design being adapted to drawings by Jansson and the plot of the story being changed as well. Unfortunately, however, after the program ended, the TV station was inundated with many complaints. The children wrote such comments as, "The characters' faces suddenly changed and became scary," and "Why did the atmosphere of the story change and it became boring?" The sponsor, Calpis, which had been satisfied with Tokyo Movie, expressed its dissatisfaction.

This evaluation led to a meeting with Jansson, and as a result, a few elements, such as character design, were returned to a status similar to Tokyo Movie, provided that it would be broadcast only in Japan.

The program was ended after well over 60 episodes.

== Reception ==
=== Critical response ===
Tove Jansson had difficulty viewing all of the episodes due to historical issues. So, having watched only the episode 7, which had just been completed at the time, she explained the following.

First of all, the starting point is wrong. That is, the Moomin Valley and the Moomin way of thinking are all expressed differently.

The Moomin family members do not live in today's modern society. They live in a society that is benign and kind. Of course, incidents do occur. The Moomin family likes incidents. However, they never argue. It is unthinkable for Moominpappa to slap his son on the buttocks, and no one in this world slaps anyone on the buttocks. If they do get angry, for example, they will only hit each other's heads with umbrellas and never use force of arms.

Overall, the feeling of the Moomin Valley has been lost. It seems to me that the only way to save this mistake is for everyone involved in this work to read the Moomin books well, to become integrated into the Moomin world, and to feel and understand that feeling.

— Tove Jansson,

Jansson also included the following other requests in her letter.

- Automobiles should not be used.
- I think the interior of the house where Moomin lives should also be changed. The rooms are too large and too empty. So, at first glance, it looks like an office.
- Moominmamma always carries a handbag.
- Moominpappa usually carries a walking stick.
- Non-non [Snorkmaiden] wears a ring on her left ankle. She also does not wear a ribbon on her head. Her hair should not be too thick.
- One thing to note in particular is that the Moomin family does not have mouths. I understand that in the case of animation, a mouth is necessary, but please think about and use as small a mouth as possible to indicate who is speaking now.

However, Jansson did not dismiss all of the work, praising the colors used in the background as "The effects of colors such as water and sky are well done. Also, she stated in 1971, "At first, they told that I was angry that the Japanese Moomins were different, and in a way this is true. I have not yet had a good look at them in Japan, As far as the films sent to me, the Japanese Moomins are aggressive. besides, the Japanese Moomins have problems with cars and money, but my Moomin Valley has no such problems. but, I began to think it would be nice to have a Moomin with a Japanese flavor.".

In 2008, Masaaki Osumi said to one of Jansson's reviews by stating.

My biggest regret is that I should have had a knee-to-knee talk with Tove Jansson, although there is nothing I can do about it now. If I had talked to her properly, we would have understood each other.

As you can see from the actual work, it is based on the "no money, no car, no fight" philosophy of the original Moomin story. Certainly cars make an appearance, but they get flat tires as soon as they come out. Other times, various civilizations are tried to be brought into the Moomin Valley, but all fail. That is a consistent theme. We used a rudimentary approach to drama: the car is there as a visual, but the reason for it is to denigrate the car society.

I had faith that Mr. Jansson would understand the theme.

— Masaaki Osumi,

Producer Shigeto Takahashi gave the series a low rating, saying he was disappointed that it could not faithfully reproduce the original worldview by Tove Jansson, but praised Kisida and the rest of the cast for their excellent performances. Incidentally, Kisida's performance in this series was so well received that she continued to play the Moomins in the Japanese dubbed version of the stop-motion Moomin TV series produced in Poland in 1977.

== Cast and characters ==
The description will focus on elements that differ from Jansson's original narrative.

=== Main characters ===
Moomin (ムーミン)
Voiced by: Kyōko Kishida
In the original work, he is named "Moomintroll".
In the Tokyo Movie season, his body is gray and ears are round and fat, giving him a hippopotamus-like appearance. In the Mushi Production season, he is closer to Jansson's design with a slimmer light blue body and slightly pointed ears. Although his age is not revealed in the work, he was defined as a boy who is about 10 years old in documents of the time thus resembling the main target audience of the animated series.
In general, he has a gentle personality and can get along with anyone. He is not good at lying or deceiving people. The Tokyo Movie season emphasizes his laid-back nature.
Moominpappa (ムーミンパパ)
Voiced by: Hitoshi Takagi
His body is gray, almost black. He always wears a silk hat and often blows a pipe or carries a walking stick.
In comparison with the original work, he is a kinder father who rarely goes on wandering trips and lives in good company with Moomin and Moominmamma.
He also narrates the next episode's preview, which ends with the mysterious words "Oom-Pah-Pah (ウンパッパ, un pappa)".
Moominmamma (ムーミンママ)
Voiced by: Akiko Takamura
Her body color is the same as Moominpappa's, and as in the original work, she wears a red and white striped apron.
She values her handbag so much that if she loses it, she gets so upset that she can't do her chores. She is not as generous as in the original story, but she is a kind, good wife and wise mother who supports her family.
She had won a beauty contest held in the Moomin Valley, which is how she met Moominpappa.
Non-Non (ノンノン)
Voiced by: Reiko Mutō
In the original books, she is named "Snork Maiden".
Her body is light green. She has primiered in episode 6 first time. She has pink hair and wears a golden anklet on her left leg, and in the Tokyo Movie season, she wears a yellow bow tie.
She is Moomin's friend. She is usually withdrawn but has a firm character and is willing to say what is important. She respects her brother Snoke who she lives with but is often taken aback by his selfishness. Snoke himself is devoted to his sister and considers her very important.
Her name in the series was derived from the director Osumi's wife's nickname, "Non-chan (ノンちゃん)". During the production of the pilot film, some it was suggested that children who saw the program would have a hard time referring to her if she did not have her own name, so a name was hastily chosen. However, Jansson said the name "reminds me of the word 'NO' and has a negative ring to it", and so did not like the name.
Snoke (スノーク)
Voiced by: Taichirō Hirokawa
In the original, he is named "Snork".
His body is green, almost gray. He always wears a golden wig, because an illustration of Snoke wearing a wig in "Finn Family Moomintroll" was used as a reference for his character design. He has also premiered in episode 6 first time.
At first, he brags to those around him about his educational background and the prestigious Snork family and looks down on the inhabitants of Moominvalley. He also tries to bring cars, money, trains, and other conveniences (elements that Jansson did not want in the Moomin Valley) to the Moomin Valley, but he fails at every attempt. Later, this aspect of his personality gradually faded into the background, but his pride remained and was emphasized. Later in the series, he became a funny and lovable comedy relief character who, while retaining his troublemaker side, spoke more politely than necessary, but also had a goofy side.
He is considered the character with the most differences between the original and the animation. This is largely due to the ad-libbing of Hirokawa, who provided his voice. He appears more often than in the original work. Hirokawa later said, "When I played Snoke, it was a time when I wanted to show what I had. As I tried to expand his personality by changing the endings of words, etc., this was gradually reflected in the script. Later, as I received more requests to perform in this style in other films, I was able to make this my signature. Played Snoke was a turning point in my career.".
Sniff (スニフ)
Voiced by: Kōsei Tomita
In the early series, Sniff's character was inconsistent. One time appearing as a friend of the Moomins and another time leading a demonstration to remove Snufkin, who was suspected of arson, from the Moomin Valley.
Eventually, halfway through the series, he settled on a good-natured but timid personality, and is portrayed as a friend of Moomin's.
Little My (ミイ)
Voiced by: Junko Hori
She is the Mymble's younger sister. Her dress is yellow and she wears a red bow tie. Initially, she appears similar to the original but gradually her design changed, becoming a girl of about 10 years old with a slightly higher isometric height.
While retaining the cheeky side of the original, the aggressive or cynical aspects of the character were replaced by the image of a headstrong, mischievous girl as was often seen in Japanese anime of the time. Later in the series, a slight Tsundere personality was added, and there were times when she seemed to be in love with Moomin.
Mymble (ミムラ姉さん)
Voiced by: Miyoko Shoji
Little My's older sister. She has green hair and pure white skin. Her clothes are a white dress and black shoes. She has premiered first time in episode 3.
Although not as sensitive as the original, she is sensitive to fashion and makeup and looks in the mirror several times a day. She has a bad drinking habit and can't stop laughing when she gets drunk.
Snufkin (スナフキン)
Voiced by: Hiroyuki Nishimoto
A traveler who came to the Moomin Valley in episode 4. His an old shirt is yellow and he wears a red silk tie. Since then, he has been living in a tent by the river in the Moomin Valley. During the winter, he travels to the south.
In the beginning, he was more like Moomin's older brother with a bit of mischievousness, but in the middle of the show, his character became quieter and more mature, in line with Nishimoto's voice acting. He has a unique philosophy. He loves solitude and freedom. Moomin is fascinated by him, and he sometimes casually teaches Moomin "Philosophy for Living". He is portrayed as a cultured individual, such as when he quotes a passage from Paul Verlaine's poem "Chanson d'automne".
Unlike Jansson's original, his favorite instrument is the guitar, not the harmonica. He often plays a song called "Songs of Lonely Mountain (おさびし山のうた)" written by Hisashi Inoue, composed and arranged by Seiichiro Uno for the series.
His guitar was the idea of Osumi who thought a guitar suited Snufkin better than a harmonica given Snufkin's image as "Lonely Man Who Came Down the Mountain."

=== Supporting characters ===
Hemulen (ヘムレンさん)
Voiced by: Masashi Amenomori
An old man living alone on the outskirts of the Moomin Valley.
His body is gray and tall, and he wears a blue skirt-like dress.
He knows a lot about plants, animals, old stories, and collects stamps as a hobby. In the second half of the series, he studies birds and plants.
In the original story, he is an eccentric old man who is only interested in his own research and hobbies. In the animation, he is transformed into a kind old man who seems to have a certain status as an elder, participating in important meetings in the Moomin Valley.
The Muskrat (じゃこうねずみ)
Voiced by: Joji Yanami
He is the longest resident of the Moomin Valley. He is a philosopher and is always thinking about waste in the world.
He lives in a hammock in a tree on the edge of the Moomin Valley and has many philosophy books. He often says "Nonsense, it's useless!" and gets into arguments with the inhabitants of the Moomin Valley because of his habit of repeating this phrase without paying attention to the atmosphere around him.
Hemul (ヘムル署長)
Voiced by: Kōichi Kitamura
He is the only policeman in the police station in the Moomin Valley. Whenever an incident occurs in the Moomin Valley, he rushes to the scene.
An original character in the anime, he is based on the appearance of an officer who was the police chief's subordinate in the original comic.
Stinky (スティンキー)
Voiced by: Chikao Ohtsuka
A furry creature who lives in the Lonely Mountain and the forest. He is always hungry.
In the original comics, he is a villain who commits theft and fraud, but in the anime, he is treated simply as a strange being living in the forest.

== Episodes ==
| # | Original Title Japanese | English translation |
|---|---|---|
| 1 | " シルクハットのひみつ" | The Secret of the Silk Hat |
| 2 | "悪魔のハートをねらえ" | Aim for the Devil's Heart |
| 3 | "雨だ!あらしだ!!洪水だ!!!" | Rain! Storm!! Flood!!! |
| 4 | "ふしぎの泉はどこにある?" | Where is the Wonderful Spring? |
| 5 | "パパの思い出のライフル" | Papa's Remembered Rifle |
| 6 | "かえってきたノンノン" | Nonnon Who Comes Back |
| 7 | "さよならガオガオ" | Good-bye, Gao-Gao |
| 8 | "ノンノンがあぶない" | Nonnon is in Danger |
| 9 | "ムーミン谷の列車大強盗" | Train Great Robber of Moomin Valley |
| 10 | "ふしぎなこびと" | Mysterious Midget |
| 11 | "消えたコレクション" | Collection Which Disappeared |
| 12 | "ムーミン谷のクリスマス" | Moomin Valley Christmas |
| 13 | "パパは売れっ子作家" | Papa is a Popular Writer |
| 14 | "ムーミン谷最後の日" | The Last Day in Moomin Valley |
| 15 | "帆を上げろ!ムーミン号" | Put Up the Sail! Moomin Ship |
| 16 | "謎のグノース博士" | Dr. Gnos of Mystery |
| 17 | "ベビーはどこに" | Where is a Baby? |
| 18 | "乞食になりたい" (再放送で「金持ちはもうやだ」に変更される) | I Want to Become a Beggar (changed to "I Already Got Tired of the Rich Person" at the time of rebroadcast) |
| 19 | "月着陸OK! " | Moonlanding, O.K.! |
| 20 | "スキーでハッスル! " | Hustle on Skis! |
| 21 | "ふしぎな家なき子" | Strange Child Without Home |
| 22 | "山男だよヤッホー! " | Mountaineer, Yoo-hoo! |
| 23 | "チビのミー大作戦" | The Big Operation Plan of Little Mee |
| 24 | "おさびし山のガンマン" | The Gunman of Deserted Mountain |
| 25 | "おめでとうスノーク" | Congratulations, Snork |
| 26 | "ノンノンこっちむいて" | Nonnon, Please Turn Around to Me |
| 27 | "顔をなくしたニンニ" | Ninny Who Lost a Face |
| 28 | "小さな大冒険" | Small, Great Adventure |
| 29 | "ひこう鬼現わる" | Flying Demon (The Hobgoblin) Appears |
| 30 | "天国からの贈りもの" | Present from Heaven |
| 31 | "ごめんねスティンキー" | Sorry, Stinky |
| 32 | "森のゆうれい屋敷" | Haunted House in the Forest |
| 33 | "おくびょうな豆泥棒" | The Cowardly Beans Thief |
| 34 | "金の馬銀の馬" | Golden Horse, Silver Horse |
| 35 | "夏祭りのオーロラ" | Aurora of Summer Festival |
| 36 | "ムーミンパパのノート" | Moomin's Papa's Notebook |
| 37 | "小さなみにくいペット" | Small, Ugly Pet |
| 38 | "人魚さんこんにちわ" | Miss Mermaid, Hello |
| 39 | "家にいるのは誰だ" | Who is in the House |
| 40 | "ニョロニョロのひみつ" | The Secret of Nyoro-Nyoro (=Hattifattener) |
| 41 | "マメルクをつかまえろ" | Catch Mamelk |
| 42 | "大きな大きなプレゼント" | Big, Big Present |
| 43 | "あらしの怪獣島" | Stormy Monster Island |
| 44 | "海の星はどこに" | Where is the Sea Star? |
| 45 | "悪魔の島がやってきた" | Devilish Island Has Come |
| 46 | "真夏の雪を探せ!" | Look for Snow of Midsummer! |
| 47 | "なくしたペンダント" | The Lost Pendant |
| 48 | "歩いてきた山びこ" | Echo Which Has Walked |
| 49 | "ピアノなんか大嫌い" | I Hate Pianos |
| 50 | "眠りの輪をぬけだせ" | Slip Out the Ring of Sleep |
| 51 | "秋はおセンチに" | To Be Sentimental in Autumn |
| 52 | "月夜に踊る人形" | The Doll Who Dances in the Moonlit Night |
| 53 | "凧が知っていた" | The Kite Knew |
| 54 | "さようなら渡り鳥" | Good-bye, Migratory Bird |
| 55 | "鳩は飛ばない" | Doves Don't Fly |
| 56 | "ムーミン谷のカーニバル" | Carnival of Moomin Valley |
| 57 | "お婆ちゃんのひみつ" | The Old Woman's Secret |
| 58 | "ノンノンがいなくなる? " | Is Nonnon Gone? |
| 59 | "手品にはタネがある" | There is a Trick in Magic |
| 60 | "ひとりぼっちの冬" | Lonely Winter |
| 61 | "消えた雪うさぎ" | Snow Rabbit Which Disappeared |
| 62 | "氷姫のいたずら" | The Ice Princess' Mischief |
| 63 | "一日だけのお姫様" | Princess Just for a Day |
| 64 | "影なんか恐くない" | Who's Afraid of Shadow? |
| 65 | "おやすみムーミン" | Good Night, Moomin |

== Home media ==
In 1989, the series saw VHS and LaserDisc releases in Japan. This is the only home media release.

LD
Vol.1-7 (episode 1-26)
VHS
"The volume of love" (episode 37, 49)
"The volume of dream" (episode 34, 64)
