= Akihiko Shimizu =

Japanese actor and voice actor

- 清水 明彦
- Born: January 30, 1962 (age 64); Chiba Prefecture, Japan
- Occupations: Actor; voice actor
- Years active: 1987–present
- Agent: Bungakuza

Akihiko Shimizu (清水 明彦, Shimizu Akihiko; born January 30, 1962) is a Japanese actor and voice actor from Chiba Prefecture. He is affiliated with Bungakuza.

== Dubbing roles ==
=== Television animation ===
- Ben 10 (Carl Tennyson)
- Detective Conan (Yoshiyuki Yabūchi)
- Jackie Chan Adventures (Valmont, John Smith, Larry Franklin, Dark Hand newcomer)
- The Tatami Galaxy (Temporal Lobe)
- Teen Titans (Brother Blood)

=== Theatrical animation ===
- Finding Nemo (Bubbles)
- Finding Dory (Bubbles)
- Hoodwinked (Detective Bill Stork)
- Meet the Robinsons (Uncle Gaston)

=== Video games ===
- Microsoft Flight Simulator X

=== Live action ===
- Ad Astra (Captain Lawrence Tanner (Donnie Keshawarz))
- Amelia (Fred Noonan (Christopher Eccleston))
- Avatar: The Way of Water (Dr. Norm Spellman (Joel David Moore))
- Babe (Ferdinand the Duck (Danny Mann))
- Bridget Jones's Diary (Interviewer)
- Coming to America (1999 Nippon TV edition) (Semmi, Morris, Reverend Brown, Ugly Girl (Arsenio Hall))
- Dark Shadows (Roger Collins (Jonny Lee Miller))
- The Detonator (Jozef Bostanescu (Tim Dutton))
- Doctor Who (Dalek)
- En liten julsaga (Ina's father (Thomas Hedengran))
- From the Earth to the Moon (Donn F. Eisele (John Mese))
- Gambit (Martin Zaidenweber (Stanley Tucci))
- Growing Pains (Maurice)
- Harry Potter and the Goblet of Fire (Igor Karkaroff (Predrag Bjelac))
- Henry Fool (Henry Fool (Thomas Jay Ryan))
- Hornblower (Count Edwinton)
- Just Mercy (Ralph Myers (Tim Blake Nelson))
- Kim Su-ro, The Iron King (Shingwi Gan / Tae-gang (Yu Oh-seong))
- Lady in the Water (Cleveland Heep (Paul Giamatti))
- Lost (Daniel Faraday (Jeremy Davies))
- Lucy (Pierre Del Rio (Amr Waked))
- Luther (DCI Ian Reed (Steven Mackintosh))
- Matilda (FBI Agent Bob (Paul Reubens))
- Medium (Joe DuBois (Jake Weber))
- Mindhunters (Vince Sherman (Clifton Collins Jr.))
- My Lovely Sam Soon (Doctor Henry Kim (Daniel Henney))
- Notting Hill (Spike (Rhys Ifans))
- The Omen (Keith Jennings (David Thewlis))
- Payback (2001 Nippon TV edition) (Val Resnick (Gregg Henry))
- Pirates of the Caribbean: On Stranger Tides (Captain of the Guard (Luke Roberts))
- Platoon (1998 DVD edition) (Lieutenant Wolfe (Mark Moses))
- Plunkett & Macleane (Lord Rochester (Alan Cumming))
- Primeval (Matt Collins (Gideon Emery))
- Rabbit Hole (Howie Corbett (Aaron Eckhart))
- Roman Holiday (2004 Nippon TV edition) (Mario Delani (Paolo Carlini))
- seaQuest DSV (Lieutenant Tim O'Neill (Ted Raimi))
- Serendipity (Lars Hammond (John Corbett))
- Taking Lives (Christopher Hart (Kiefer Sutherland))
- There Will Be Blood (Henry Brands (Kevin J. O'Connor))
- Transformers (Mister Hosney (Peter Jacobson))
- Underworld: Rise of the Lycans (Andreas Tanis (Steven Mackintosh))
- Unsane (David Strine/George Shaw (Joshua Leonard))
- The West Wing (Matthew Vincente "Matt" Santos (Jimmy Smits))
- The World's End (Steven Prince (Paddy Considine))
