= Hitoshi Takagi =

Japanese actor (1925–2004)

- 高木均
- Born: February 26, 1925; Tokyo City, Tokyo Prefecture, Japan
- Died: February 11, 2004 (aged 78); Tokyo, Japan
- Other names: Kin-san (キンさん); Kin-sensei (キン先生)
- Occupations: Actor; voice actor
- Years active: 1949–2004
- Agent: 81 Produce
- Notable work: My Neighbor Totoro as Totoro
- Website: Official profile

Hitoshi Takagi (高木均, Takagi Hitoshi; February 26, 1925 – February 11, 2004) was a Japanese actor and voice actor who was last affiliated with 81 Produce.

He is best known for providing the original voice of the titular character Totoro in the Studio Ghibli animated feature film My Neighbor Totoro.

== Death ==
He died at age 78 due to partial ischemic heart disease.

== Filmography ==
=== Television animation ===
- Moomin and New Moomin (Moominpappa)
- Gregory Horror Show (Mummy Papa)

=== Theatrical animation ===
- Dōbutsu Takarajima (Ossan)
- Pikachu's Rescue Adventure (Kabigon/Snorlax)
- Pink: Water Bandit, Rain Bandit (Silver)
- My Neighbor Totoro (Totoro)

=== Video games ===
- Virtua Fighter 2 (1994) (Shun Di)
- Virtua Fighter 3 (1996) (Shun Di)
- Gregory Horror Show: Soul Collector (2003) (Mummy Papa)

=== Dubbing ===
- The Empire Strikes Back (Yoda)
- Return of the Jedi (Yoda)
- Malcolm X (Elijah Muhammad (Al Freeman Jr.))

=== Live-action ===
- Lady Snowblood (Matsuemon)
- Rope Hell (Hitoshi Hanamura)
- Tampopo (Restaurant owner)
- Hanzo the Razor: The Snare (Tanbaya the merchant)

== See also ==
- Voice acting in Japan
