= Animal Treasure Island =

1971 film by Hiroshi Ikeda

- Kanji: どうぶつ宝島
- Revised Hepburn: Dōbutsu Takarajima
- Directed by: Hiroshi Ikeda
- Screenplay by: Kei Iijima; Hiroshi Ikeda
- Story by: Hayao Miyazaki
- Based on: Treasure Island by Robert Louis Stevenson
- Produced by: Hiroshi Ôkawa
- Starring: Minori Matsushima; Asao Koike; Hitoshi Takagi; Fusako Amachi; Kosei Tomita; Kinto Tamura
- Music by: Naozumi Yamamoto
- Production company: Toei Animation
- Distributed by: Toei
- Release date: March 20, 1971
- Running time: 78 minutes
- Country: Japan
- Language: Japanese

Animal Treasure Island (どうぶつ宝島, Dōbutsu Takarajima) is a 1971 Japanese anime adventure comedy film directed by Hiroshi Ikeda and based on the 1883 novel Treasure Island by Robert Louis Stevenson. The film was produced by Toei Animation and released on the studio's 20th anniversary. In the United States, the film was syndicated directly to television by American International Television under the title Treasure Island.

== Plot ==
Jim, the young assistant of the keeper of the Admiral Bembo inn, and his mouse friend Gran (Rex in English) are one night asked by a rough, one-legged stranger for a room and to watch out for suspicious-looking characters. The latter, a band of black-cloaked assassins, soon arrive, and the man asks Jim to take care of the casket he's been carrying before engaging the intruders. Jim and Gran narrowly escape. After they return to the ransacked inn later, they open the casket in hopes of gaining some money as compensation for the damage. Inside they find a map to the treasure hidden by the infamous pirate Captain Flint.

Jim and Gran immediately set out with their steam-powered barrel boat - and the innkeeper's infant son Baboo as a stowaway - to recover the riches, but after a few days at sea they are captured by the pirate crew of Captain Silver and brought to Pirate Island, where both are sold to a slave merchant. Alerted by Gran's unchecked babbling, one of the crew, the monocled Baron, also steals the map from Jim in order to gain captaincy over his own ship by presenting it to the pirates' council.

In their holding cell, Jim and Gran encounter Kathy, Captain Flint's feisty and resolute granddaughter. They manage to escape the cell, and Jim recovers the map as the assembled captains of Pirate Island pour over it. Kathy, however, promptly steals it, and having no ship to reach the island, she accepts the Baron's offer of transportation, which is in turn instantly usurped by Silver. Silver and his crew try their best to steal the map back during the voyage, but Kathy's distrust and Jim's secret assistance foil the scheme repeatedly. After an attack by the pirate captain chairman, which they narrowly escape, Jim and Gran incapacitate Silver and his crew with their own sleeping potion.

Just before reaching the island, however, a storm rips the ship apart; Jim, Gran, Baboo, and the baby's self-appointed guardian, the walrus Otto, arrive just after Silver, his crew, and Kathy, now a prisoner of the pirates. In exchange for her friends' safety, Kathy offers to lead Silver to the exact location of the treasure. Silver, however, plans on double-crossing both Jim and his own crew to get the treasure for himself.

While Otto holds off his fellow pirates (who soon surrender after realizing that Silver wouldn't share with them anyway), Jim chases after Silver as he and his monkey helmsman, Spider, are climbing towards the top of an extinct volcano where the treasure is hidden. In the end Kathy sacrifices the final secret of recovering the treasure to save Jim's life, but it does no good to Silver; the mechanism he is told to trigger does not reveal the treasure immediately, but instead serves to drain the island volcano's crater lake. Silver and Spider are swept out into the sea, and the lake drains to reveal Flint's sunken ship, where Jim, Gran, Kathy and the reformed pirates find the treasure. The film ends with Jim and Kathy sailing away with Silver's ship, while the dethroned Silver and Spider chase after them on improvised log boats, quarreling all the while.

== Voice cast ==
| Character | Original | English |
|---|---|---|
| Jim | Minori Matsushima | Billie Lou Watt |
| Gran | Eiko Masuyama | Billie Lou Watt |
| Kathy | Soko Tenchi | Corinne Orr |
| Silver | Asao Koike | Ray Owens |
| Otto | Kosei Tomita | Unknown |
| Ossan | Hitoshi Takagi | Ray Owens |
| Spider | Nishikibito Tamura | Unknown |
| Kankan | Naozumi Yamamoto | Unknown |
| Count | Joji Yanami | Unknown |
| Sailors | Hidekatsu Shibata; Kunihiko Kitagawa; Isamu Tanonaka | Unknown |
| Pub | Sachiko Chijimatsu | Unknown |
| Chairman of the council of pirates | Ichirō Nagai | Unknown |

== Manga ==
Hayao Miyazaki created a manga adaptation as a promotional tie-in for the film. It was serialized in 13 installments, printed in color, in the Sunday edition of Tokyo Shimbun from January to March 1971.

== Home media ==
In North America, the film was released on DVD by anime distributor Discotek Media on Nov 15, 2005. A Blu-ray release followed on Jul 25, 2023. Both releases include the original Japanese version with subtitles, as well as the English dubbing from American International's release.
