= Kōsei Tomita =

Japanese actor (1936–2020)

- 富田 耕生
- Born: Kōkichi Tomita (富田 耕吉); February 4, 1936; Oji Ward, Tokyo Prefecture, Japan
- Died: September 27, 2020 (aged 84); Shizuoka Prefecture, Japan
- Other name: Tomikou-san (とみこうさん)
- Occupations: Actor; voice actor
- Years active: 1950–2020
- Agent: Production Baobab (final affiliation)
- Spouse: 1
- Website: Official profile

Kōsei Tomita (富田 耕生, Tomita Kōsei; February 4, 1936 – September 27, 2020) was a Japanese actor and voice actor from Tokyo Prefecture affiliated with Production Baobab.

He was most well known for voicing Doraemon in the first half of the 1973 Doraemon television anime series and Shunsaku Ban, also known as Mustachio (Higeoyaji) or Daddy Walrus, in many Osamu Tezuka productions.

He was known for dubbing over Ernest Borgnine, Orson Welles, Charles Durning, Burt Young, Lee J. Cobb and many more. He also provided the Japanese dubbing voice of Mario (Bob Hoskins) in the 1993 Super Mario Bros. film.

== Biography ==
=== Early life ===
Tomita was born in Oji Ward, Tokyo Prefecture (now part of Kita Ward) on February 4, 1936. He was raised in the family of a bank employee, with his childhood home located near Asukayama Park, famous as a recreation spot ever since the Edo period and would be crowded with people around the time cherry blossoms would bloom. In his days of childhood, Tomita would run all over the mountains, climb ginkgo trees to gather ginkgo nuts, and go as far as the nearby Meishu Falls to stand under the roaring, plunging waterfall like a mischievous boy.

Because of the Pacific War, when he was in third grade elementary school, he was evacuated to Kasukawa Village, Seta District, Gunma Prefecture (now known as Kasukawa-chō, Maebashi City, Gunma Prefecture) as part of the schoolchildren's evacuation program.

In high school, he went to Tokyo Metropolitan Daiyon Commercial High School where he joined the table tennis club and competed in the 8th National Sports Festival that was held in Tokushima Prefecture in 1953. In addition, he was active in both the drama club and his own theater group. His senior in the high school drama club was Nobuaki Sekine, and his junior was voice actor Toshio Furukawa.

=== Career ===
After seeing the play The Blue Apple by the Tōgei Theater Company during high school, he aspired to become a stage actor, so he took the Tōgei entrance exam before graduating high school and became a trainee once he graduated. He wanted to become an actor, but because of his parents' opposition, he enrolled in the Faculty of Law at Chuo University, only to drop out after only a year. He kept dropping out a secret from his parents, but was forgiven two years later with the help of his sister. He was among the third generation of trainees at Togei. Amongst his fellow trainees was Isamu Tanonaka, and a bit later his junior in the "Class of 3.5" was Masako Nozawa.

Until he was around 25 or 26, he was struggling financially—with there even a time when all he could afford to eat was koppepan—but he didn't feel he had gone through any particular hardships. During his time as a trainee, he would do any part-time job he could find to make a living, such as delivering newspapers and working as a sandwich man, and lived with actor Hatsuo Yamaya, who was also in the Tōgei Theater Company, inside a tiny 4.8 square meters room.

While working as a stage actor at Tōgei, he also did work in the media such as handling background noise/crowd noises in radio shows such as the Chikage Awashima Show, and appearing as an actor in television dramas during the live broadcasting era. Tomita's debut as a voice actor was voicing a minor role in a jidaigeki radio drama on NHK Radio. By the end of the television drama Seven Detectives, which aired on TBS from 1961 to 1969, he had come to portray good and prominent roles.

When dubbing work came to Tōgei, Tomita, a young member of the troupe, officially began his professional career as a voice actor. According to him, his debut in Japanese dubbing for foreign projects in Japanese was either in Annie Get Your Gun or Robin Hood, with his anime voice acting debut being in Astro Boy. As he became extremely busy after starting work as a voice actor, at his peak he had a schedule of performing in 11 regular shows a week and up to 60 a month, a period of getting only 2 to 3 hours of sleep that reportedly lasted for over 15 years.

In August 1965, he participated in the launch and establishment of the Gendaijin Gekijo theater company.

After that, through Tonokai and Tokyo Artist Production, in 1969 he joined Aoni Production, established as a voice acting production, as a founding member. In an opening greeting letter, he announced his stage name change to "Kōsei Tomita" (富田 耕生), having been known as "Kōkichi Tomita" (富田 耕吉). He served as the de facto leader when 16 voice actors dissatisfied with Aoni Production, having grown to a large agency, left the company to establish Production Baobab independently in 1979.

Later on, Baobab would experience members leaving in succession. Mari Shimizu published a book in 2015 that noted only four founding voice actors still remained at that time, consisting of Tomita, herself, Noriko Ohara, and Kenichi Ogata. However the other three except Tomita subsequently moved on to other agencies one after another, leaving Tomita as the last founding voice actor remaining with Baobab until the end of his life.

=== Final years ===
In 2009, he received an Achievement Award at the 3rd Seiyu Awards.

In 2014, following the death of Ichirō Nagai on January 27, Tomita officially took over the role of Jirokichi Suzuki in the Great Detective Conan television anime series for six years until his own death.

=== Death ===
Tomita died of a stroke on September 27, 2020, at the age of 84.

In the October 3 broadcast of Great Detective Conan that aired the same year, a memorial message screen crawl for Tomita appeared during a scene that featured Jirokichi.

== Filmography ==
=== Anime ===
List of voice performances in anime
| Year | Title | Role | Notes | Source |
|---|---|---|---|---|
| 1963 | Tetsujin 28-go | Chief Ootsuka | | |
| 1966 | Sally the Witch | Daimaō | 1st TV series | |
| 1968 | GeGeGe no Kitarō | Konaki-Jijii | 1st TV series, Ep. 29 | |
| 1968 | The World of Hans Christian Andersen | Hans' father | | |
| 1968 | Cyborg 009 | King of Galaria | | |
| 1968 | Akane-chan | Chairman Kitaoji | | |
| 1969 | Mōretsu Atarō | Butamatsu, Beshi, Dekapan | 1st series | |
| 1969 | Flying Phantom Ship | Secretary of Defense | | |
| 1969 | Tiger Mask | Kintaro Ohki | | |
| 1969-70 | Moomin | Sniff | | |
| 1970 | Little Remi and Famous Dog Capi | Jerome | | |
| 1971 | Andersen stories | Sultan, Emperor of China | Ep. 6, 11-12 | |
| 1971 | Animal Treasure Island | Otto | | |
| 1971 | Wandering Sun | Kumagoro | | |
| 1971 | Ali Baba and the Forty Thieves | Spirit of the Lamp | | |
| 1971 | Apache Baseball Army ja:アパッチ野球軍 | Principal Iwaki | | |
| 1971 | Lupin The Third Part I | Gantetsu, George Takigawa | | |
| 1972 | New Moomin | Sniff | | |
| 1972 | Moonlight Mask | Dr. Hinken | | |
| 1972 | The Three Musketeers in Boots | Mouse Leader | | |
| 1972 | Triton of the Sea | Leharu | | |
| 1972 | Mahōtsukai Chappy | Donchan, Grandpa | | |
| 1972 | Devilman | Gelge | | |
| 1972 | Mon Cheri CoCo ja:モンシェリCoCo | Baker | | |
| 1972 | Hazedon ja:ハゼドン | Suzukintoki | | |
| 1972 | Mazinger Z | Dr. Hell, Nuke, Ankoku Daishogun | | |
| 1973 | Demetan Croaker, The Boy Frog | Gyata | | |
| 1973 | Fables of the Green Forest | Buster Bear | | |
| 1973 | Doraemon | Doraemon | Eps. 1–13 | |
| 1973 | Mazinger Z vs. Devilman | Dr. Hell, Nuke | | |
| 1973 | Zero Tester ja:ゼロテスター | Dr. Gao | | |
| 1973 | Cutie Honey | Danbei Hayami | | |
| 1974 | Yaemon, the Locomotive ja:きかんしゃやえもん D51の大冒険 | Harubaru | | |
| 1974 | Vicky the Viking | Halvar | | |
| 1974–75 | Getter Robo series | Professor Saotome, Joho | | |
| 1974 | Hoshi no Ko Chobin | Kumandon | | |
| 1975 | Hans Christian Andersen's The Little Mermaid | Duke the Whale | | |
| 1975 | Great Mazinger vs. Getter Robo | Professor Saotome | | |
| 1975 | Maya the Bee | Christopher, Puck | | |
| 1975 | Kum-Kum | Paru-Paru | | |
| 1975 | Grendizer | Danbei Makiba, Gandaru commander | | |
| 1976 | Puss 'n Boots Travels Around the World | Father Mouse, Cat King | | |
| 1976 | Chōdenji Robo Combattler V | Professor Yotsuya | | |
| 1976 | Grendizer, Getter Robo G, Great Mazinger: Kessen! Daikaijuu | Professor Saotome | | |
| 1976 | Hana no Kakaricho ja:花の係長 | Ayanoroji Mashumaro | | |
| 1977 | Jetter Mars | Higeoyaji | TV series | |
| 1977 | Wakusei Robo Danguard Ace series | Dr. Ooedo, Tamagar | | |
| 1977 | Lupin the Third Part II | Olivera Net, Inspector Konaizo, Garlic | | |
| 1978 | Starzinger | Don Hakka | | |
| 1978 | Farewell to Space Battleship Yamato | Zavival | | |
| 1978 | One Million-year Trip: Bander Book ja:100万年地球の旅 バンダーブック | King Bolbox | TV special | |
| 1978 | Space Battleship Yamato II | Zavival | | |
| 1978 | The Mystery of Mamo | Commissioner | | |
| 1979 | Cyborg 009 | Professor Gilmore | | |
| 1979 | Animation Kikō Marco Polo no Bōken アニメーション紀行 マルコ・ポーロの冒険 | Matteo Polo | | |
| 1979 | Lupin 813 怪盗ルパン813の謎 | Kesselbach ケセルバッハ | | |
| 1979 | Yamato: The New Voyage | Deda | | |
| 1979 | Undersea Super Train: Marine Express | Shunsaku Ban | | |
| 1980 | Space Emperor God Sigma | Dr. Kazami | | |
| 1980 | Fumoon | Hige Oyaji | TV special | |
| 1980 | The New Adventures of Gigantor | Inspector Ohtsuka | | |
| 1981 | Beast King GoLion | Dai Bazāru Daiteiō ("Emperor Daibazaal") | | |
| 1981 | Enchanted Journey | Pippo | | |
| 1981 | Bremen 4: Angels in Hell ja:ブレーメン4 地獄の中の天使たち | Adagio | | |
| 1981 | Six God Combination Godmars | Shigeru Otsuka | | |
| 1981 | Urusei Yatsura | Tadashi Yanagi | | |
| 1982 | Game Center Arashi | Dr. Taitei | | |
| 1982 | The Mysterious Cities of Gold | Pisaro, Teteora | | |
| 1983 | Doraemon: Nobita and the Castle of the Undersea Devil | Poseidon | | |
| 1983 | Armored Trooper Votoms | Bouleuse Gotho | | |
| 1983 | Puroyagu o 10-bai tanoshiku miru hōhō ja:プロ野球を10倍楽しく見る方法 | Spy, Arakawa | | |
| 1983 | lady Georgie | The Governor of Sydney | | |
| 1983 | Serendipity the Pink Dragon | Captain Sumaji | | |
| 1983 | Ginga Hyōryū Vifam | Narrator, Commander, Aizeru | | |
| 1984 | Lupin III Part III | Chinkai, Niharofu, Karourosu | | |
| 1984 | Attacker You! | Director Takada | | |
| 1984 | Puroyagu o 10-bai tanoshiku miru hōhō part 2 プロ野球を10倍楽しく見る方法 Part 2 | Osawa | | |
| 1984 | Once Upon a Time... Space | Jumbo | French and Japanese production | |
| 1984 | Bagi, the Monster of Mighty Nature | The Chief | | |
| 1984 | Chō-ryoku robo garatto 超力ロボ ガラット | Governor | | |
| 1984 | Elves of the Forest | Yourupukki | | |
| 1984–86 | Sherlock Hound series | Doctor Watson | Also specials | |
| 1985–88 | Pro Golfer Saru series ja:プロゴルファー猿 | Uncle | | |
| 1985 | Dream-Star Button Nose | Hobita | | |
| 1986 | Maison Ikkoku | Mr. Chigusa, Kyoko's father | | |
| 1986 | Galaxy Investigation 2100: Border Planet ja:銀河探査2100年 ボーダープラネット | Hige-Oyaji | TV special | |
| 1988 | Doctor Chichibuyama ja:ドクター秩父山 | Dr. Koshigaya | | |
| 1988 | Oishinbo | Tōjin Tōyama | | |
| 1988 | Legend of the Galactic Heroes | Alexander Bucock | | |
| 1989 | The Green Cat | Shunsaku Ban | OAV (Note: The Green Cat was produced as an OVA in October 10, 1983, but there is uncertainty whether it was released to market. It was later released as an OAV on July 18, 1989.) | |
| 1989 | Tezuka Osamu Story: I am Son-goku 手塚治虫物語 ぼくは孫悟空 | Higeoyaji | TV special | |
| 1989–91 | Ys | Roda Tree | | |
| 1989 | The Laughing Salesman | Taizo Awate | | |
| 1990 | Heisei Genius Bakabon | Bakabon's Papa | | |
| 1990 | Lupin the 3rd: The Hemingway Papers | Konsano | | |
| 1990 | Soreike! Anpanman Minami no Umi o Sukue! それいけ！アンパンマン みなみの海をすくえ！ | Obake Ika | | |
| 1990 | The Three-Eyed One | Granputta | | |
| 1992 | Floral Magician Mary Bell | Holy Tree | | |
| 1992 | Nontan | Kashinoki | | |
| 1993 | New Dominion Tank Police | Chief | | |
| 1994-95 | New Cutie Honey | Danbei Hayami | | |
| 1994 | Crayon Shin-chan: The Secret Treasure of Buri Buri Kingdom | Anaconda | | |
| 1996 | Raideen the Superior | Barghest | | |
| 1997 | The Dog of Flanders | Ansole (Hardware store) | | |
| 1997 | Jungle Emperor Leo | Higeoyaji | Film | |
| 1998 | Doraemon: Nobita's Great Adventure in the South Seas | Dr. Clone | | |
| 1998 | Cowboy Bebop | Dr. Bacchus | | |
| 1998 | Golgo 13: Queen Bee | Gordon | OVA | |
| 1998 | Master Keaton | Otter | | |
| 1999 | The Doraemons: Funny Candy of Okashinana!? | King Salt | | |
| 1999 | Shukan Storyland | Chief | | |
| 2000 | Digimon Adventure 02 | Chikara Hida | | |
| 2000 | Time Bokan 2000: Kaitou Kiramekiman | Kingyoya deme zo 金魚屋出目蔵 | | |
| 2000 | Tezuka Osamu ga Kieta?! 20 Seiki Saigo no Kaijiken ja:手塚治虫が消えた!? 20世紀最後の怪事件 | Higeoyagi (Shunsaku Ban) | | |
| 2000 | Shin Getter Robo vs Neo Getter Robo | Professor Saotome | OVA series | |
| 2001 | Salaryman Kintaro | Ryuzo Igo | | |
| 2001 | Metropolis | Shinsaku Ban | Film | |
| 2001 | Mazinkaiser | Dr. Hell | | |
| 2002 | Tokyo Underground | Old man | | |
| 2003 | Astro Boy: Mighty Atom | Higeoyaji | TV series | |
| 2003–06 | Black Jack series | Master | TV series, related specials such as "The Two Doctors of Darkness", 21 series | |
| 2005 | Kaiketsu Zorori | Director Gomez | | |
| 2005 | Buzzer Beater | Executive | | |
| 2006 | Gin Tama | Sanzo Fudo | | |
| 2007 | El Cazador de la Bruja | Bucho | | |
| 2007 | Summer Days with Coo | Toshio | | |
| 2008 | Golgo 13 | Ingemar Peterson | TV series | |
| 2008 | Scarecrowman the Animation | Nero | | |
| 2009 | Kupū~!! Mamegoma! | Ho Grandfather | | |
| 2009 | Astro Boy | Mr. Mustachio | | |
| 2011 | 装甲騎兵ボトムズ 孤影再び | Buruzu Goto ブールーズ・ゴウト | OVA | |
| 2014 | The World Is Still Beautiful | Ratcliff | | |
| 2014 | Magic Kaito 1412 | Jirokichi Suzuki | | |
| 2015 | Detective Conan: Sunflowers of Inferno | Jirokichi Suzuki | | |
| 2015 | Young Black Jack | Shunsaku Ban (aka Hige-Oyaji) | | |
| 2016 | Detective Conan Episode "ONE" - The Great Detective Turned Small | Jirokichi Suzuki | | |
| 2018 | Cutie Honey Universe | Danbei Hayami | | |

=== Video games ===
List of voice performances in video games
| Year | Title | Role | Notes | Source |
|---|---|---|---|---|
| 1997 | Lego Island | Infomaniac | | |
| 2000 | Salaryman Kintaro the game | Ryuzo Igo | | |
| 2003 | GeGeGe no Kitaro games | Nurikabe | | |
| 2008 | Crayon Shin-Chan: Arashi o Yobu Cinema Land クレヨンしんちゃん 嵐を呼ぶ シネマランド カチンコガチンコ大活劇！ | Anaconda | | |
| 2008 | Professional Golfer Saru ja:プロゴルファー猿 | Uncle | | |
| 2010 | Fallout: New Vegas | The King | | |
| 2010 | Call of Duty: Black Ops | Daniel Clark | | |
| 2012 | Maji de Watashi ni Koi Shinasai! S | Masa Nabeshima | Adult PC Game, as Uchi Sumi to-ryū 内須美斗流 | |

=== Overseas dubbing ===
List of voice performances in overseas dubbing (Live-action)
| Series | Role | Voice dub for | Notes | Source |
|---|---|---|---|---|
| Rocky | Paulie Pennino | Burt Young | 1983 TBS edition | |
| Rocky II | Paulie Pennino | Burt Young | 1984 TBS edition | |
| Rocky III | Paulie Pennino | Burt Young | 1987 TBS edition | |
| Rocky IV | Paulie Pennino | Burt Young | 1989 TBS and 1995 TV Asahi editions | |
| Rocky V | Paulie Pennino | Burt Young | 1994 NTV and VHS editions | |
| Rocky Balboa | Paulie Pennino | Burt Young | | |
| 12 Angry Men | Juror #3 | Lee J. Cobb | 1969 NET/TV Asahi edition | |
| Adaptation | Robert McKee | Brian Cox | | |
| Alien 3 | Harold Andrews | Brian Glover | VHS/DVD edition | |
| Amadeus | Giuseppe Bonno | Patrick Hines | 1986 TV Asahi edition | |
| Air Force One | Lloyd Shepherd | Paul Guilfoyle | 2001 NTV edition | |
| The Blue Lagoon | Paddy Button | Leo McKern | 1983 TBS edition | |
| Charlie's Angels: Full Throttle | Mr. Munday | John Cleese | | |
| The Cincinnati Kid | Lancey "The Man" Howard | Edward G. Robinson | 1973 TV Asahi and 1978 Fuji TV editions | |
| Cutthroat Island | John Reed | Maury Chaykin | 1998 Fuji TV edition | |
| Dae Jang Geum | | | | |
| The Diary of Anne Frank | Hans Van Daan | Lou Jacobi | 1972 NET edition | |
| Die Hard | Al Powell | Reginald VelJohnson | 1992 Fuji TV edition | |
| Die Hard 2 | Al Powell | Reginald VelJohnson | 1992 Fuji TV edition | |
| Doc Hollywood | Dr. Aurelius Hogue | Barnard Hughes | DVD edition (plays Mayor Nick Nicholson in the Fuji TV Dub) | |
| Dr. Strangelove | Major T.J. "King" Kong | Slim Pickens | 1971 TV Asahi edition | |
| DodgeBall: A True Underdog Story | Patches O'Houlihan | Rip Torn | | |
| Dog Day Afternoon | Sergeant Eugene Moretti | Charles Durning | 1979 Fuji TV edition | |
| Dracula | Dr. Jack Seward | Donald Pleasence | 1982 TV Asahi edition | |
| Duck, You Sucker! | Juan Miranda | Rod Steiger | 1977 TBS and DVD editions | |
| El Dorado | Bart Jason | Ed Asner | 1991 TV Tokyo edition | |
| Emperor of the North Pole | Shack | Ernest Borgnine | 1977 Tokyo Channel 12/TV Tokyo edition | |
| Exodus | Barak Ben Canaan | Lee J. Cobb | | |
| For Whom The Bell Tolls | Pablo | Akim Tamiroff | 1977 TBS edition | |
| The Gauntlet | Josephson | Pat Hingle | 1983 Fuji TV edition | |
| Gladiator | Antonius Proximo | Oliver Reed | DVD edition | |
| The Godfather | Peter Clemenza | Richard S. Castellano | 1976 NTV edition | |
| The Great Silence | Sheriff Gideon Burnett | Frank Wolff | 1972 TV Asahi edition | |
| Gremlins | Randall "Rand" Peltzer | Hoyt Axton | 1988 Fuji TV, 1992 TV Asahi, and DVD editions | |
| Halloween II | Dr. Loomis | Donald Pleasence | 1988 NTV edition | |
| Hard Target | Uncle Clarence Douvee | Wilford Brimley | 1997 Fuji TV edition | |
| Hudson Hawk | Tommy "Five-Tone" Messina | Danny Aiello | 1996 Fuji TV and DVD editions | |
| The Hunter | Ritchie Blumenthal | Eli Wallach | 1987 TV Asahi edition | |
| I.Q. | Albert Einstein | Walter Matthau | | |
| Key Largo | Johnny Rocco/Howard Brown | Edward G. Robinson | 1967 NET edition | |
| Knock Off | Johanson | Paul Sorvino | | |
| Kramer vs. Kramer | John Shaunessy | Howard Duff | 1985 NTV edition | |
| Life with Mikey | Mr. Corcoran | David Huddleston | | |
| Man on the Moon | George Shapiro | Danny DeVito | | |
| Miller's Crossing | Johnny Caspar | Jon Polito | | |
| The Naked Gun: From the Files of Police Squad! | Captain Ed Hocken | George Kennedy | DVD edition | |
| The Nude Bomb | The Chief | Dana Elcar | 1988 TV Asahi edition | |
| Ocean's Twelve | Saul Bloom | Carl Reiner | 2007 NTV edition | |
| Ocean's 8 | Reuben Tishkoff | Elliott Gould | | |
| Pirates of the Caribbean: On Stranger Tides | King George II | Richard Griffiths | | |
| Planet of the Apes | Lieutenant John Landon | Robert Gunner | 1973 TBS edition | |
| Police Story | "Uncle" Bill Wong | Bill Tung | 1987 Fuji TV edition | |
| The Presidio | Sgt. Maj. Ross Maclure | Jack Warden | DVD edition | |
| The Producers | Max Bialystock | Zero Mostel | | |
| Raw Deal | Luigi Patrovita | Sam Wanamaker | 1991 TV Asahi edition | |
| Red Heat | Commander Lou Donnelly | Peter Boyle | 1990 TV Asahi edition | |
| Red Scorpion | Dewey Ferguson | M. Emmet Walsh | | |
| Renaissance Man | Bill Rago | Danny DeVito | | |
| Serendipity | Bloomingdale's Salesman | Eugene Levy | DVD edition | |
| Short Circuit 2 | Oscar Baldwin | Jack Weston | NTV Dub | |
| The Smurfs | Papa Smurf | Jonathan Winters | | |
| The Smurfs 2 | Papa Smurf | Jonathan Winters | | |
| Star Trek: The Original Series | Harry Mudd | Roger C. Carmel | | |
| Stuart Little | Mr. Stout | Bruno Kirby | | |
| Super Mario Bros. | Mario | Bob Hoskins | 1994 NTV and DVD editions | |
| The Terminator | Ed Traxler | Paul Winfield | 1992 VHS edition | |
| Timeline | Professor Edward A. Johnston | Billy Connolly | | |
| Those Magnificent Men in Their Flying Machines or How I Flew from London to Paris in 25 Hours and 11 Minutes | Colonel Manfred Von Holstein | Gert Fröbe | 1988 NHK Dub | |
| The Trouble with Harry | Capt. Albert Wiles | Edmund Gwenn | 1986 TV Asahi and Blu-Ray editions | |
| Uncommon Valor | Colonel Jason Rhodes | Gene Hackman | 1987 NTV edition | |
| Valerian and the City of a Thousand Planets | The Defence Minister | Herbie Hancock | | |
| While You Were Sleeping | Saul | Jack Warden | | |

List of voice performances in overseas dubbing (Animation)
| Series | Role | Notes | Source |
|---|---|---|---|
| Alice in Wonderland | Dodo | | |
| Arthur and the Invisibles | King | | |
| Atlantis: The Lost Empire | Jebidiah Allardyce "Cookie" Farnsworth | | |
| Atlantis: Milo's Return | Jebidiah Allardyce "Cookie" Farnsworth | | |
| Batman: The Animated Series | The Penguin | 1992 TV, Warner Bros. Animation | |
| Highlander: The Search for Vengeance | Amergan | joint anime installment, first released in US in 2007 then in Japan 2008 | |
| Kung Fu Panda | Oogway | | |
| Mary and Max | Narrator | | |
| Open Season | McSquizzy | | |
| Sleeping Beauty | King Hubert | | |
| Smallfoot | Dorgle | | |
