= Kwon Hyi-ro =

Zainichi Korean criminal (1928–2010)

- Hangul: 김희로
- Hanja: 金嬉老
- RR: Gim Huiro
- MR: Kim Hŭiro

Kim Hyi-ro (Japanese: Kin Kirō, né Kwon, 20 November 1928 – 26 March 2010) was a second-generation Korean in Japan born in November 1928 in Shimizu, Shizuoka, who held 18 Japanese citizens hostage in 1968.

== Background ==
His father, Kwon Myung-sool, was killed in an accident during construction work in 1931. His mother remarried in 1933. At that time, his family name changed from Kwon to Kim. Since his family was poor, he dropped out of elementary school by the fifth grade, after repeated racial intimidation by classmates. He was caught for theft and was put into the reformatory in 1943. After that, he committed crimes including theft, swindling, and burglary, resulting in prison terms.

== Hostage situation ==
In what became known as "The Kin Kiro Incident", Kwon Hyi-ro shot and killed a gang leader and a gang member with his rifle in Shimizu City on 20 February 1968. Being sought by police, he then broke into a hotel and, armed with dynamite and a Howa M300 Rifle (a copy of the M1 Carbine), took as hostages 18 people who were either hotel guests or family of the hotel owner. He then called police to tell them where he was hiding. On the second day of the incident, Kwon Hyi-ro released 5 of the hostages, but threatened to use dynamite to blow himself up if police came near him. He blamed Japan for "the creation and maintenance of two Koreas." He demanded a public apology from two policemen about discriminatory remarks made to him in the past and full disclosure of the criminal background of the two men he had killed. NHK broadcast the apology from two policemen on national television. Kwon was arrested on 24 February after a 4-day standoff. Ten of the hostages had been released by the time he was seized by police officers posing as reporters. Kwon was subsequently prosecuted for murder, confinement and violation of explosive control rules. The Shizuoka District Court sentenced him to life imprisonment on 17 June 1973, and the sentence was confirmed by Supreme Court of Japan in 1975.

Tsuneari Fukuda satirised the incident in the 1968 play Wakatte tamaru ka!. The 1969 story Manazashi no kabe (The wall of the gaze) by Kin Kakuei described the plight of the Zainichi (Korean Japanese) and described Kwon's actions as "justifiable resistance", and his case as "an 'ethnic problem' created by the crimes against Korea by the Japanese state and society". The 1968 incident and his efforts on behalf of the Korean minority in Japan "made him a national hero in South Korea". The 1992 South Korean film Kim's War, portrayed him as a hero.

== Arson incident ==
Kwon was released on parole on 7 September 1999 at the age of 70, on the condition that he would never return to Japan. He moved to South Korea where he changed his surname back to Kwon. He was considered in South Korea as "the hero who resisted discrimination", and was given a luxury flat and living expenses. However, on 3 September 2000, he broke into his lover's apartment in Busan City, attacked her husband, and set fire to the apartment. He was arrested on an attempted murder and suspicion of arson and, after being diagnosed as having a personality disorder, was sent to a sanitarium. As a result, a Korean musical about his life that had already scheduled an international tour was abruptly cancelled, just before its premiere. He was released in 2003.

== Death ==
In his later years, citing "visiting his mother's grave in Japan, Kim planned to petition the Japanese Ministry of Justice for permission to enter Japan through the Korean government in March 2010. However, he died of prostate cancer at a hospital in Busan on March 26, 2010, at the age of 81. He wished to be buried at his mother's gravesite in Kakegawa City, but due to discord with his family, it was never realized and the ashes were scattered off the coast of Busan and at the site of the incident.
