= Shiho Ogawa (footballer, born 2003) =

Japanese footballer

Personal information
- Date of birth: 14 May 2003 (age 23)
- Height: 1.69 m (5 ft 7 in)
- Position: Forward

Team information
- Current team: Cerezo Osaka U-23
- Number: 56

Youth career
- –2020: Cerezo Osaka

Senior career*
Years	Team	Apps	(Gls)
2020–	Cerezo Osaka U-23	1	(1)
- * Club domestic league appearances and goals as of 17:04, 13 October 2020 (UTC)

Shiho Ogawa (小河 詩朋, Ogawa Shiho; born 14 May 2003) is a Japanese footballer currently playing as a forward for Cerezo Osaka U-23.

== Career statistics ==
=== Club ===
As of 13 October 2020.

Club	Season	League			National Cup		League Cup		Other		Total	
Club	Season	Division	Apps	Goals	Apps	Goals	Apps	Goals	Apps	Goals	Apps	Goals
Cerezo Osaka U-23	2020	J3 League	1	1	–		–		0	0	1	1
Career total			1	1	0	0	0	0	0	0	1	1
