= Reiko Mutō =

Japanese actress (1935–2006)

- 武藤 礼子
- Born: March 1, 1935; Tokyo Prefecture, Japan
- Died: October 29, 2006 (aged 71); Setagaya, Tokyo, Japan
- Occupations: Actress; voice actress
- Years active: 1945–2006
- Agent: Aoni Production

Reiko Mutō (武藤 礼子 or 武藤 禮子, Mutō Reiko; March 1, 1935 – October 29, 2006) was a Japanese actress and voice actress from Tokyo, Japan. She is best known for being the Japanese voice of Elizabeth Taylor, and voicing main characters such as the titular character Melmo in Marvelous Melmo, Uran ("Astro Girl" in the English dub) in Astro Boy, and Non Non in Moomin.

== Biography ==
As a child, she found that she enjoyed acting after joining the child acting troupe Gekidan Komadori.

=== Death ===
Mutō died of acute heart failure on October 29, 2006, in Setagaya, Tokyo, Japan.

== Filmography ==
=== Television animation ===
- Mighty Atom (1963–1966, Uran)
- Ribbon Knight (1967–1968, Hecate, Venus)
- Sabu to Ichi Torimono Hikae (1968–1969, Midori)
- Star of the Giants (1968–1971, Kyōko)
- Dororo (1969, Mio)
- Kamui the Ninja (1969, Tone (Ep.8))
- Moomin (1969–1970 and 1972, Non Non)
- Attack No. 1 (1969–1971, Michiru Sanjō)
- Andersen Stories (1971, Psyche (Ep. 49))
- Lupin III (1971–1972, Linda)
- Marvelous Melmo (1971–1972, Melmo)
- Mokku of the Oak Tree (1972, Mustard Fairy Kasie (ep.8))
- Akadō Suzunosuke (1972–1973, Nagisa (Eps 36-37))
- Devilman (1972–1973, Psycho Jenny)
- Hazedon (1972–1973, Shīran)
- Dokonjō Gaeru (1972–1974, Yoshiko Yamaguchi)
- Casshan (1973–1974, Midori Azuma / Suwani)
- Samurai Giants (1973–1974, Rika Minami)
- Little Wansa (1973–04-02, Mammy, Mimi's Mother)
- Kōya no Shōnen Isamu (1973)
- A Dog of Flanders (1975, Narrator)
- La Seine no Hoshi (1975, Marie Antoinette)
- 3000 Leagues in Search of Mother (1976, Cristina Mequinez)
- Ie Naki Ko (1977–1978, Milligan's wife)
- 100 Mannen Chikyū no Tabi: Bander Book (1978-08-27, Queen Tasuka)
- Yakyū-kyō no Uta (1978)
- Anne of Green Gables (1979, Barry's wife)
- The Rose of Versailles (1979–1980, Countess Yolande de Polignac)
- Hoeru Bunbun (1980–1981)
- Invincible Robo Trider G7 (1980–1981, Jilba (ep.27-33))
- Six God Combination Godmars (1981–1982, Flore's mother)
- Warrior of Love Rainbowman (1982–1983, Akiko Yamato)
- The Yearling (1983–1985, Ory Baxter)
- Katri, Girl of the Meadows (1984, narrator, Lanta's wife, Akki household maid)
- Maple Town (1986–1987, Christine / Mama)
- Hello! Lady Lynn (1988–1989, Isabel Montgomery)
- Dragon Quest (1989–1991, Sophia)
- Sally the Witch (1989–1991, neighbor lady)
- Pygmalio (1990–1991, Garatia)
- Miracle Girls (1993, Ameonna)
- GeGeGe no Kitarō (1996–1998, Sachi)
- Kindaichi Case Files (1997–2000, Shino Tatsumi)
- Wansa-kun (1973, Mamī, Mimi's mother)

=== Theatrical animation ===
- Anju to Zushiōmaru (1961-07-19, Nezumi no Chonko)
- Moomin (1971, Non Non)
- Moomin (1972, Non Non)
- Yakyūkyō no Uta (1979, Kayo)
- Natsu e no Tobira (1981-03-20, Sara Veda)
- The Sea Prince and the Fire Child (1981-07-18, Temisu)
- Queen Millennia (1982-03-13, Rārera)
- Arcadia of My Youth (1982-07-28, Maya)
- Crusher Joe (1983-03-12, Machua)
- Golgo 13 (1983, Laura)
- Arei no Kagami (1985, Universal Consciousness)
- Arion (March 1986, Demeter)

=== Original video animation (OVA) ===
- Nightsong of Splendor (1989-09-25, Akiko Hashō (羽生燁子))
- Project A-ko 4: FINAL (1989-10-07, Kei's mother)

=== Dubbing ===
- Elizabeth Taylor
  - Father of the Bride (Katherine 'Kay' Banks)
  - Father's Little Dividend (Kay Dunstan)
  - Ivanhoe (Rebecca)
  - The Last Time I Saw Paris (Helen Ellswirth)
  - Giant (eslie Lynnton Benedict)
  - Raintree County (Susanna Drake)
  - Suddenly, Last Summer (Catherine Holly)
  - The Sandpiper (Laura Reynolds)
  - The Blue Bird (Queen of Light/Mother/Witch/Maternal Love)
  - The Mirror Crack'd (Marina Rudd)
  - The Flintstones (Pearl Slaghoople)
- Julie Andrews
  - The Sound of Music (Maria von Trapp)
  - Star! (Gertrude Lawrence)
  - 10 (Samantha Taylor)
  - Victor/Victoria (Victoria Grant / Count Victor Grezhinski)
- Broken Lance (1969 TV Asahi edition) (Barbara (Jean Peters))
- Cold Sweat (1979 NTV edition) (Fabienne Martin (Liv Ullmann))
- The Concorde ... Airport '79 (1982 TV Asahi edition) (Maggie Whelan (Susan Blakely))
- Dressed to Kill (1983 TBS edition) (Kate Miller (Angie Dickinson))
- The Eddy Duchin Story (Marjorie Oelrichs (Kim Novak))
- The Horse Soldiers (1973 NET edition) (Miss Hannah Hunter of Greenbriar (Constance Towers))
- The Mephisto Waltz (Paula Clarkson (Jacqueline Bisset))
- The Mighty Peking Man (Samantha (Evelyne Kraft))
- My Darling Clementine (1969 TV Asahi edition) (Clementine Carter (Cathy Downs))
- The Omen (Katherine Thorn (Lee Remick))
- Psycho (1975 Fuji TV edition) (Marion Crane (Janet Leigh))
- Rio Bravo (1973 TV Asahi edition) (Feathers (Angie Dickinson))
- Sergeant York (1967 TV Asahi edition) (Gracie Williams (Joan Leslie))
- Serpico (1977 TV Asahi edition) (Laurie (Barbara Eda-Young))
- Texas Across the River (1971 TBS edition) (Phoebe Ann Naylor (Rosemary Forsyth))
- Waterloo Bridge (1972 TV Tokyo edition) (Myra Lester (Vivien Leigh))
