= Bungakuza =

Japanese theatre company

- 文学座; Bungakuza
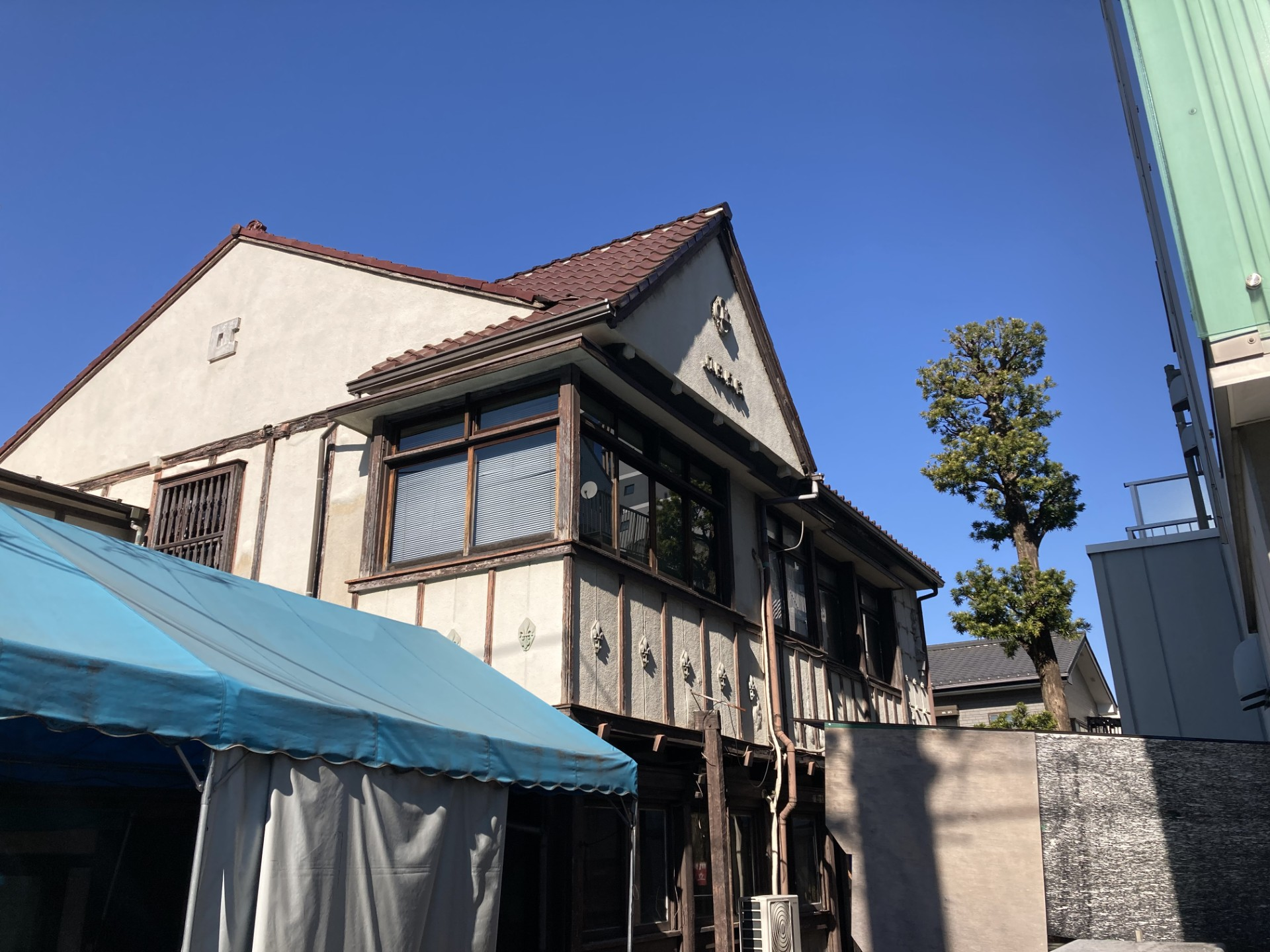
- The Bungakuza's "Atelier" in Shinanomachi, Tokyo
- Formation: September 6, 1937
- Type: Theatre group
- Purpose: Shingeki
- Location: Japan
- Website: www.bungakuza.com

Bungakuza (文学座, Bungakuza) is a Japanese theatre company. Along with the Mingei Theatre Company and the Haiyuza Theatre Company it is considered one of the "Big Three" among Shingeki theatre troupes.

== History ==
The company was founded by Kunio Kishida, Mantarō Kubota and Bunroku Shishi on September 6, 1937. Its name means "Literature Theatre".

On March 25, 1938, the company staged its first public performances with the plays "Magnificent Woman" (Migoto na Onna), "Peace at Home" (Wagaya no Heiwa), and "Knock" (Kunokku).

After suffering repression at the hands of the state leading up to and during World War II, Bungakuza reemerged in the early postwar period.

In the 1950s, many Shingeki theatre troupes were viewed as left-wing or even communist. However, Bungakuza was considered one of the least ideological troupes. Thus many people were surprised when Bungakuza's leaders agreed to stage a tour of Communist China in 1961. Even more controversial was the decision to modify the script of the company's flagship play, "The Life of a Woman" (Onna no isshō), to accommodate the ideological demands of their Chinese hosts, which was seen as an abridgment of artistic freedom. This angered many of the younger members of the troupe, and in 1962, right in the middle of the company's New Year's production, 29 members abruptly left the troupe to found their own company, the Cloud Theatre Company (Gekidan Kumo).

Another controversy arose in 1963. The author Yukio Mishima, who had a long-running affiliation with Bungakuza dating back to the early 1950s, wrote a play for the company called The Harp of Joy (喜びの琴, Yorokobi no koto), but star actress Haruko Sugimura (杉村春子) and other actors refused to perform it because the protagonist held anti-communist views and had lines criticizing a conspiracy of world communism. As a result of this ideological conflict, Mishima quit Bungakuza along with around 10 other members. Mishima and those who supported him formed their own troupe, Neo Littérature Théâtre (劇団NLT; Gekidan NLT)—since "Bungakuza" means "literature theatre" this was a way of saying "New Bungakuza" in French. Mishima's new troupe successfully staged The Harp of Joy in May 1964.

Despite these controversies, Bungakuza survived and continued to thrive, and continues to stage plays today, although it has long since dropped the "Shingeki" moniker.

== Notable members ==
Male actors

- Tōru Emori
- Yasuyoshi Hara
- Takeshi Katō
- Katsuya Kobayashi
- Shirō Saitō
- Yoshisada Sakaguchi
- Akihiko Shimizu
- Takayuki Sugō
- Hiroshi Takahashi
- Masaaki Uchino

Female actors

- Hiroe Oka
- Mayumi Sako
- Yoshie Taira
- Kaori Yamagata
- Michiko Yamamoto

== Former notable members ==
- Yukio Mishima
- Tsutomu Yamazaki
- Shinobu Terajima
- Kaori Momoi
- Isao Hashizume
- Masatoshi Nakamura
- Tappie Shimokawa
- Hiroki Hasegawa
- Hiroshi Akutagawa
- Tsuneari Fukuda

=== Deceased members ===
- Ken Mitsuda
- Haruko Sugimura
- Kiwako Taichi
- Yūsaku Matsuda
- Yukio Mishima

== Research establishment alumni ==
- Chō
- Urara Takano
- Katsuhiko Yokomitsu
