= Hiroshi Akutagawa =

Japanese actor

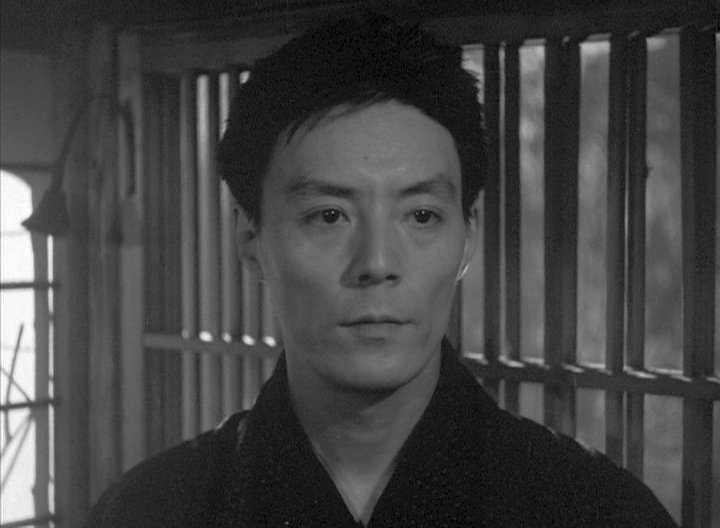
- Hiroshi Akutagawa in The Wild Geese
- Born: 30 March 1920; Tokyo, Japan
- Died: 28 October 1981 (aged 61); Tokyo, Japan
- Other name: Kiyoaki Ikehata
- Occupations: Actor, director
- Years active: 1947–1979
- Spouse: Ruriko Akutagawa

Hiroshi Akutagawa (芥川比呂志, Akutagawa Hiroshi; 30 March 1920 – 28 October 1981) was a Japanese stage and film actor and director. In his 30 years spanning career, he appeared in numerous stage productions and films by directors such as Shirō Toyoda, Tadashi Imai, Heinosuke Gosho, Akira Kurosawa and Nagisa Ōshima.

== Biography ==
Hiroshi Akutagawa was born in Tokyo as the son of writer Ryūnosuke Akutagawa. A graduate in French literature from Keio University, he formed the theatre group "Mugi no kai" in 1947 together with Teruko Nagaoka and Michio Kato, before all three joined the Bungakuza theatre group in 1949. Akutagawa became one of the ensemble's central actors and directors and also started to appear in films, receiving the Mainichi Film Award for his performance in Where Chimneys Are Seen (1953).

In 1963, Akutagawa left Bungakuza and co-founded the "Kumo" theatre group together with Kyōko Kishida, Tsuneari Fukuda and others. In 1975, he also left Kumo, again with Kishida, and formed the theatre group "En". His last appearance was in the 1979 stage production of Kyōka Izumi's play Yasha-ga-ike. He died of tuberculosis in 1981.

Film historian Donald Richie compared Akutagawa's acting style, which he saw as "based on acute understatement", with Montgomery Clift and Gérard Philipe.

Akutagawa's younger brother was the composer Yasushi Akutagawa.

== Filmography (selected) ==
- 1953: Where Chimneys Are Seen, dir. Heinosuke Gosho
- 1953: The Wild Geese, dir. Shirō Toyoda
- 1953: An Inlet of Muddy Water, dir. Tadashi Imai
- 1960: Night and Fog in Japan, dir. Nagisa Ōshima
- 1960: The Twilight Story, dir. Shirō Toyoda
- 1967: Portrait of Chieko, dir. Noboru Nakamura
- 1970: The Scandalous Adventures of Buraikan, dir. Masahiro Shinoda
- 1970: Tora! Tora! Tora!, dir. Richard Fleischer, Kinji Fukasaku and Toshio Masuda
- 1970: Dodes'ka-den, dir. Akira Kurosawa
