= Shiho Sakanishi =

Japanese scholar, critic (1896–1976)

- 坂西 志保
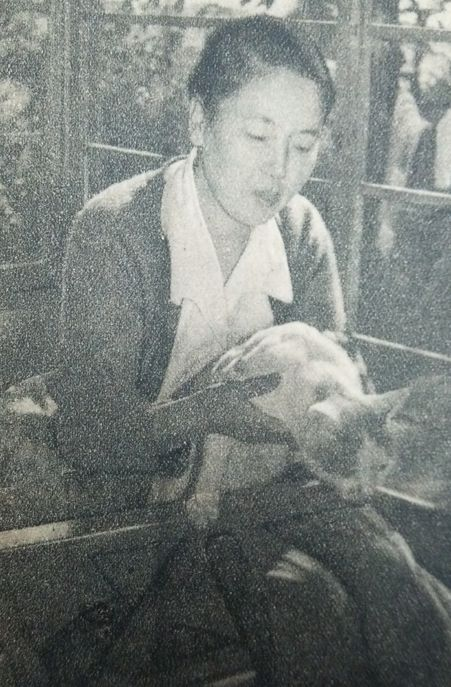
- Born: December 6, 1896; Shioya, Tochigi
- Died: January 14, 1976 (aged 79); Ōiso
- Occupations: educator, librarian, critic, translator, writer

Academic background
- Education: Tokyo Woman's Christian University; Wheaton College
- Alma mater: University of Michigan (Doctorate)

Academic work
- Institutions: Rikkyo University; Library of Congress; Supreme Commander for the Allied Powers; Hollins University; Japan Police Scholarship Association

Shiho Sakanishi (Japanese: 坂西 志保; 1896–1976) was a Japanese critic, essayist, academic, translator, author, and librarian. She was the first Japanese citizen to serve as a librarian at the Library of Congress and was a notable critic of the role of women in Japanese society.

== Biography ==
Shiho Sakanishi was born into a rural Christian family. In 1921, she took an exam organized by the American Women's University Association, which allowed her to enroll at Wheaton College in Massachusetts. She became the first Japanese student in the college's history and, four years later, earned a degree in art and aesthetics.

Unable to return to Japan due to the aftermath of the 1923 Kantō earthquake, she decided to stay in the United States to continue her higher education. In 1929, she earned a doctorate from the University of Michigan. The following year, Sakanishi taught English at Hollins College in Virginia, where she held the position of assistant professor.

From 1930 to 1942, she became the first person of Japanese origin to serve as a librarian at the Library of Congress. She initially held the position of assistant to the head of the Chinese Literature Division (which later became the Orientalia Division before evolving into the current Asian Division). In 1935, she became the director of this same division, and later, the assistant chief of the Japanese Section of the Orientalia Division. This section was created in 1938 to cover Japanese culture.

Her contributions to the Japanese Section included organizing the reference service, cataloging over 15,000 Japanese works, acquiring Japanese literature, building connections with local Japanese organizations, securing recurring funding for the section, and performing several other key functions. During her tenure, the Japanese Section's collection grew from 12,000 to 34,000 works. In 1941, she assisted Kenneth Landon, a Southeast Asia expert, in the war effort against Japanese troops.

In December 1941, due to the developments of World War II, including the attack on Pearl Harbor on December 7, 1941, and the subsequent declaration of war by the United States against Japan the following day, she was suspended from her position until June 1942. During her suspension, Sakanishi was interned and, in August 1942, managed to secure repatriation to Japan. Between September and November 1945, Sakanishi served briefly under General MacArthur during the American Occupation of Japan.
