= List of Japanese films of 1938 =

A list of films produced in Japan in 1938 (see 1938 in film).

== Film releases ==
Opening	Title	Director	Cast	Genre	Notes	Ref
1 January	The Skull Coin	Yoshiro Tsuji	Kanjūrō Arashi, Kensaku Hara, Takashi Shimura	Jidaigeki		
2 January	Shanghai	Fumio Kamei		Documentary, War		
7 January	Five Scouts	Tomotaka Tasaka	Hikaru Hoshi, Ichirō Izawa	War, adventure	Winner of the Kinema Junpo Award for Best Film of the Year.	
22 January	Mito Kōmon Manyu-ki	Kunio Watanabe	Utaemon Ichikawa, Ryūtarō Ōtomo, Shin Tokudaiji	Jidaigeki		
1 February	Subterranean Heat	Eisuke Takizawa	Mitsugu Fujii, Chieko Takehisa, Sadao Maruyama	Jidaigeki		
2 February	The Giant	Mansaku Itami	Setsuko Hara, Yoshio Kosugi, Denjirō Ōkōchi	Historical drama		
17 February	Queen of the Wind	Yasushi Sasaki	Kaneko Fujiwara, Kiyoko Hara, Kōichi Itō, Fumiko Katsuragi	Drama		
20 February	Nanking	Keiji Matsuzaki		Documentary, War		
1 March	The Abe Clan	Hisatora Kumagai		Jidaigeki		
11 March	Rainbow Hill	Toshio Ōtani	Hideko Takamine, Akira Kishii, Chizuko Kanda	Comedy		
15 March	Kurama Tengu	Masahiro Makino, Sadatsugu Matsuda	Kanjūrō Arashi, Kunitaro Bando, Tokumaro Dan, Takashi Shimura	Jidaigeki		
17 March	Crybaby Apprentice	Shirō Toyoda	Mitsugu Fujii, Isamu Yamaguchi, Reiji Ichiki, Yumeko Aizome	Drama		
18 March	King Kong Appears in Edo	Soya Kumagai	Eizaburo Matsumoto		Lost film. Possibly Japan's first kaiju film.	
31 March	Chushingura	Masahiro Makino, Tomiyasu Ikeda	Chiezō Kataoka, Tsumasaburō Bandō, Kanjūrō Arashi, Takashi Shimura	Jidaigeki		
1 April	So Goes My Love	Yasujirō Shimazu	Shūji Sano, Sanae Takasugi, Mieko Takamine	Drama		
5 April	King Kong Appears in Edo: The Episode of Gold	Sôya Kumagai		Action		
14 April	Hotaru no hikari	Yasushi Sasaki	Michiko Kuwano, Sanae Takasugi, Mieko Takamine	Romance, Drama		
1 May	Tojuro’s Love	Kajirō Yamamoto	Kazuo Hasegawa, Takako Irie, Kamatari Fujiwara, Osamu Takizawa, Hideko Takamine	Drama		
18 May	Children of the Sun	Yutaka Abe	Den Obinata, Yumeko Aizome, Kōji Mitsui, Izumi Hara	Drama		
1 June	Ōma no tsuji	Eisuke Takizawa	Chōjūrō Kawarasaki, Suemon Nakamura, Matsunosuke Onoe	Jidaigeki		
11 June	Pastoral Symphony	Satsuo Yamamoto	Setsuko Hara, Ryo Sayama, Minoru Takada	Drama		
15 June	Fallen Blossoms	Tamizō Ishida	Ranko Hanai, Reiko Minakami, Rikie Sanjō	Horror		
17 June	Taiko’s Rising in the World	Hiroshi Inagaki	Kanjūrō Arashi, Ryūnosuke Tsukigata, Gorō Kawabe	Jidaigeki		
21 June	Enoken's Hokaibo	Torajirō Saitō	Ken'ichi Enomoto, Mitsuko Hirokawa, Shojiro Ogasawara	Comedy		
1 July	Mother and Child	Minoru Shibuya	Kinuyo Tanaka, Mitsuko Yoshikawa, Shin Saburi	Drama		
7 July	The Masseurs and a Woman	Hiroshi Shimizu	Mieko Takamine, Shin Tokudaiji, Shinichi Himori, Shin Saburi	Drama		
21 July	Kaidan Oiwa Yakusha	Kanji Suganuma, Jun Ozaki	Kiyoshi Sawada, Fujiko Fukamizu, Michisaburō Segawa	Horror, Drama		
21 August	Composition Class	Kajirō Yamamoto	Hideko Takamine, Masaru Kodaka, Shiro Mizutani	Drama		
15 September	The Tree of Love	Hiromasa Nomura	Kinuyo Tanaka, Ken Uehara, Shin Saburi, Kenji Oyama, Mitsuko Mito	Romance, drama		
21 September	A Pebble by the Wayside	Tomotaka Tasaka	Akihiko Katayama, Reizaburo Yamamoto, Hisako Takihana	Drama		
29 September	Family Diary	Hiroshi Shimizu	Ken Uehara, Michiko Kuwano, Shin Saburi			
29 September	Tsuruhachi and Tsurujiro	Mikio Naruse	Kazuo Hasegawa, Isuzu Yamada, Katamari Fujiwara	Drama		
6 October	Ah, My Home Town	Kenji Mizoguchi	Fumiko Yamaji, Masao Shimizu, Seiichi Kato		—N/a	
3 November	The Ghost Cat and the Mysterious Shamisen	Kiyohiko Ushihara	Sumiko Suzuki, Mitsuko Mori, Kinue Utagawa	Horror		
9 November	Nightingale	Shirō Toyoda	Yōtarō Katsumi, Ko Mihashi, Haruko Sugimura	Drama		
30 November	Chocolate and Soldiers	Takeshi Sato	Kamatari Fujiwara, Kiyoshi Hosoi, Yuko Ichinose, Hideko Takamine	War, Drama		
1 December	Yaji and Kita's Travelling Diary	Masahiro Makino	Chiezō Kataoka, Kyoji Sugi, Takashi Shimura	Comedy, Adventure		
29 December	Enoken's Surprising Life	Kajirō Yamamoto	Ken'ichi Enomoto, Noboru Kiritachi, Mitsuko Hirokawa, Denjirō Ōkōchi	Comedy		
31 December	Monster Cat Akabe Daimyojin	Kazuo Mori	Sumiko Suzuki, Kinue Utagawa, Omenosuke Ichikawa	Horror		

== See also ==
- 1938 in Japan
