= Abe clan (disambiguation) =

The Abe clan is one of the oldest of the major Japanese clans.

Abe clan may also refer to:

== Politics ==
- The Satō–Kishi–Abe family, which produced three Japanese prime ministers

== Literature and film ==
- "Abe Ichizoku" (short story), a 1913 Japanese short story by Mori Ōgai translated into English as "The Abe Family" or "The Abe Clan"
  - Abe ichizoku (1938 film), a Japanese film adaptation directed by Hisatora Kumagai and released in English as The Abe Clan
  - Abe ichizoku (1995 film), a Japanese television film adaptation directed by Kinji Fukasaku and released in English as The Abe Clan
