= List of Japanese films of 1939 =

A list of films produced in Japan in 1939 (see 1939 in film).

== Film releases ==
Opening	Title	Director	Cast	Genre	Notes	Ref
4 January	Enoken's Shrewd Period	Kajirō Yamamoto				
7 January	Okayo's Preparedness	Yasujirō Shimazu				
11 January	Blizzard Ronin	Kondo Katsuhiko				
15 January	Honcho Monster Cat Story	Hôzô Nakajima		Horror		
28 January	Four Seasons of Children	Hiroshi Shimizu		Drama		
1 February	Old Songs	Tamizo Ishida		Drama		
1 February	Women at War	Yasushi Sasaki		War, drama		
15 February	Explosion!	Tomotaka Tasaka		Drama		
15 February	Southern Wind	Minoru Shibuya	Chishū Ryū			
21 February	Beautiful Departure	Satsuo Yamamoto	Setsuko Hara, Hideko Takamine			
21 February	Numazu Officer School	Tadashi Imai		War, drama		
11 March	The Whole Family Works	Mikio Naruse		Drama		
14 March	My Daughter's Only Wish	Torajirō Saitō	Hideko Takamine			
16 March	Tsukiyo Karasu	Kintaro Inoue				
20 March	Roppa no Hōjiro Sensei	Yutaka Abe	Hideko Takamine			
30 March	Noroi hi no gin neko	Kanenori Yamada		Horror		
March	Fighting Soldiers	Fumio Kamei		Documentary, war		
1 April	A Brother and His Younger Sister	Yasujirō Shimazu	Chishū Ryū	Drama		
13 April	Earth	Tomu Uchida		Drama	Winner of the Kinema Junpo Award for Best Film of the Year.	
13 April	Ie naki musume	Seiichi Ina				
13 April	Spring Thunder	Keisuke Sasaki	Chishū Ryū			
15 April	Yama to shojo	Minoru Matsui				
4 May	Maboroshi-jô no bakeneko	Seiji Suezaki		Horror		
5 May	Zoku aizen katsura	Hiromasa Nomura				
11 May	The Old Man of the Propeller	Kunio Watanabe		Drama, comedy		
20 May	Shanghai Landing Party	Hisatora Kumagai	Setsuko Hara	War, drama		
21 May	Enoken's Kurama Tengu	Kondo Katsuhiko		Action, comedy		
25 May	Haha ni sasaguru uta	Seiichi Ina		Drama		
31 May	Ichiyo Higuchi	Kyōtarō Namiki	Hideko Takamine	Biopic, drama		
1 June	New Woman Question and Answer	Yasushi Sasaki	Chishū Ryū	Drama		
1 June	Shunjû ittôryû	Santaro Marune		Historical drama		
15 June	Weeds with Flowers	Hiroshi Shimizu				
17 June	Osanaki mono no hata	Takeshi Sato				
28 June	Iron Brothers	Kunio Watanabe				
6 July	Haha o tataeru uta	Kenkichi Hara				
9 July	The Fighting Firemen	Tamizo Ishida		Historical drama		
20 July	Five Siblings	Kōzaburō Yoshimura		Drama		
July	Benkei tai Ushiwaka	Kenzō Masaoka		Animation, comedy, action		
1 August	Kaidan Kyôren onna shishô	Shigeru Kido		Horror		
10 August	Enoken's Mori no Ishimatsu	Nobuo Nakagawa		Comedy		
10 August	Sincerity	Mikio Naruse		Drama		
20 August	Machi	Satsuo Yamamoto	Setsuko Hara	Drama		
31 August	Lovers' Duet	Yasushi Sasaki		Drama		
19 September	Easy Alley	Kajirō Yamamoto				
19 September	Enoken no ganbari senjutsu	Nobuo Nakagawa		War		
19 September	Rivals	Nobuo Nakagawa		Comedy		
10 October	The Story of the Last Chrysanthemums	Kenji Mizoguchi		Historical drama		
12 October	Tanuki goten	Keigo Kimura				
13 October	Surging Waves	Kenkichi Hara				
14 October	Mud and Soldiers	Tomotaka Tasaka		War		
21 October	Flower Picking Diary	Tamizo Ishida	Hideko Takamine			
21 October	The Day Before	Ryō Hagiwara	Hideko Takamine	Historical drama		
31 October	Women in Tokyo	Osamu Fushimizu	Setsuko Hara			
9 November	Daini no shuppatsu	Iseo Hirukawa				
30 November	Sea Raiding Unit	Kichiro Tsuji		Historical drama		
30 November	Song of the White Orchid	Kunio Watanabe	Yoshiko Yamaguchi	Drama		
1 December	Warm Current	Kōzaburō Yoshimura		Drama		
7 December	Devoted Servant Naosuke	Saburo Kunikida				
14 December	Singing Lovebirds	Masahiro Makino				
17 December	Mother is Strong	Keisuke Sasaki	Chishū Ryū			
20 December	Shinpen Tange Sazen: Sekigan no maki	Nobuo Nakagawa	Hideko Takamine	Action, historical		
29 December	Enoken's Yaji and Kita	Nobuo Nakagawa		Historical, comedy		
29 December	Entatsu, Achako and Torazo: Chuji Kunisada's First Smile of the New Year	Torajirō Saitō				
	Revenge of Wronged Souls	Toshio Ōtani				

== See also ==
- 1939 in Japan
