= A Woman's Life =

A Woman's Life may refer to:

- A Woman's Life (play), a 1945 play by Kaoru Morimoto
- A Woman's Life (2016 film), a French-Belgian drama film
- A Woman's Life (2026 film), a French comedy drama film
- Une vie (novel), often translated as A Woman's Life, a novel by Guy de Maupassant
