= Chikao =

- Gender: Male

Origin
- Origin: Japanese
- Meaning: Different meanings depending on the kanji used

Chikao (written: 周夫, 親生 or 千禾夫) is a masculine Japanese given name. People with this name include:

- Tanaka Chikao (田中 千禾夫; 1905–1995), Japanese playwright and dramatist
- Chikao Ohtsuka (大塚 周夫; 1929–2015), Japanese voice actor
- Chikao Adachi (安達 親生), Japanese musician, former member of The Stalin
