= Kunio Kishida =

Japanese writer (1890–1954)

Kishida Kunio
- 岸田國士
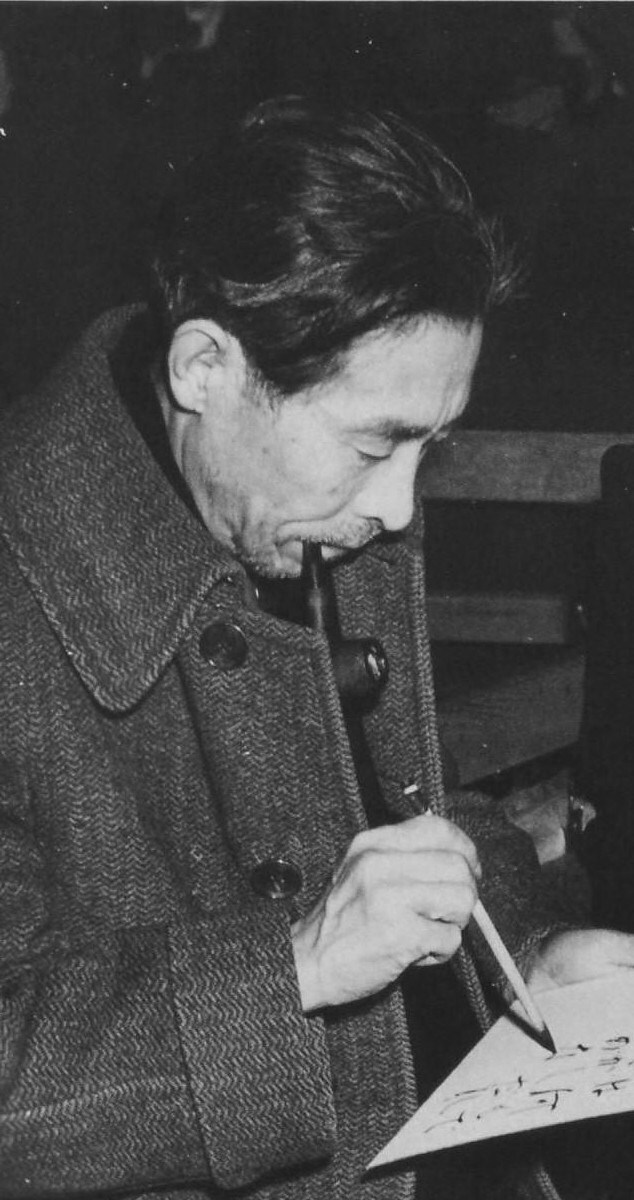
- Born: November 2, 1890; Yotsuya, Tokyo
- Died: March 5, 1954 (aged 63); Tokyo, Japan
- Education: Meiji University, University of Tokyo
- Occupations: playwright, novelist, critic, translator, impresario, lecturer
- Spouse: Murakawa Tokiko
- Children: Eriko Kishida; Kyoko Kishida
- Writing career
- Language: Japanese
- Period: 1923–1954
- Genre: Shingeki

Kunio Kishida (岸田 國士, Kishida Kunio, 2 November 1890 – 5 March 1954) was a Japanese playwright, dramatist, novelist, lecturer, acting coach, theatre critic, translator, and proponent of Shingeki ("New Theatre"/”New Drama"). Kishida spearheaded the modernization of Japanese dramaturgy and transformed Japanese theatre acting. He was a staunch advocate for the theatre to operate as a dual artistic and literary space.

At the beginning of the Meiji era, efforts to modernize the Japanese theatre became a critical topic for Japanese playwrights, and these endeavors persisted well into the 1920s before Kishida wrote his first plays. However, his predecessors' attempts did not come to fruition, and Kishida is recognized as the first playwright to successfully reform the narrative, thematic, and performative trajectories of Japanese playwriting and acting through Shingeki.

Kishida was known for his vehement opposition to traditional Japanese kabuki, noh, and shimpa theatre. Following a temporary residency in France, Kishida became heavily inspired by European theatres, playwriting, and acting styles and believed these needed to be applied to Japanese theatre. While Kishida never intended his nation's theatrical scene to undergo a complete Westernization, he recognized that Japan's increasingly globalized presence meant it needed to adapt and engage with its Western counterparts' literary and theatrical practices.

From Kishida's perspective, the theatre was never intended to serve as a popular entertainment venue. He argued for the essentiality of the theatre as a serious performative and literary mode of creative expression.

== Early life and education (1890–1919) ==
Kishida was born on November 2, 1890, in Yotsuya, Tokyo, to a military family with historic samurai roots in Kishu (present-day Wakayama Prefecture). His father, Shozo, was a military officer in the Imperial Army, and Kishida was expected to follow the family lifestyle.

In his youth, Kishida attended military preparatory schools. At seventeen years old, he developed a passion for literature, particularly French authors such as François-René de Chateaubriand and Jean-Jacques Rousseau.

Following family tradition, he enlisted in the Japanese military and was commissioned as an officer in the Army in 1912. Kishida left the military in 1914 after he expressed dissatisfaction with this career path.

After his military dismissal, Kishida decided to pursue his passion for literature and enrolled in Tokyo Imperial University. Upon his admittance in 1917, Kishida studied French language and literature in the Faculty of Letters.

== Exposure to European Theatre (1919 - 1923) ==
In 1919, Kishida traveled to France to expose himself to the European theatre and expand his literary interests. Upon his arrival, he was employed as a translator at the Japanese Embassy in Paris and for the Secretariat of the League of Nations, which permitted him the financial resources to live in France for multiple years.

Shortly thereafter, Kishida studied theatre at the Theatre du Vieux-Colombier, which marked the beginning of his lifelong admiration for French drama. Under the tutelage of the director Jacques Copeau, Kishida learned about the history and customs of French and European theatre. Copeau's instruction, combined with Kishida's attendance at numerous European theatrical performances, supplied him with an abundance of knowledge on the successful attributes of Western dramaturgy. Of these, the actors' ability to express subtle emotions and to convey natural dialogue that neither felt forced nor exaggerated were among the most lasting takeaways in Kishida's observations as a spectator.

The effectiveness of the modern European acting style was the result of the Drama Purification Movement that coincided with Kishida's residency. The movement sought the complete erasure of any semblance of artificiality in both theatre performances and playwriting. Copeau was a fervent supporter of this school of thought and applied the movement's tenets in his training for actors, which involved a consideration for performances to be open and naturalistic. Subsequently, Kishida recognized that this unique approach to acting was absent in his country's theatrical traditions of kabuki, noh, and shimpa.

In addition to the French theatre, Kishida developed an infatuation for other European playwrights after he saw Copeau's staged productions of works by Henrik Ibsen, Anton Chekhov, and Johan August Strindberg. A significant reason for his appreciation stemmed from the psychological and emotional depth inherent in the characters and narratives of their plays.

During his studies with Copeau in 1921–1922, Kishida drafted his first play, A Wan Smile. He was inspired to create an original play after he overheard one of his favorite actors, the Russian Georges Pitoeff, express an interest to perform in a Japanese play. Kishida already had multiple copies of contemporary Japanese plays to share with him but decided against it and composed his own work. After he read Kishida's prose, Pitoeff remarked that the play was "really quite interesting"; no records indicate if the play was ever produced.

In October 1922, Kishida took a leave of absence and temporarily resided in Southern France to recover from a severe lung hemorrhage.

== Return to Japan and Early Theatre Modernization (1923 - 1929) ==
Kishida quickly returned to Japan in 1923 after he learned about his father's death and went to care for his mother and sisters. His recent illness, sudden departure from Europe, and grief over his father's passing caused great consternation for Kishida and manifested into uncertainty about his career future.

Kishida followed the latest trends in Japanese theatre and became fascinated with the works of the contemporary dramatist Yuzo Yamamoto. A colleague formally introduced him to Yamamoto, to which Kishida shared his manuscript for A Wan Smile with him for review. Kishida was initially concerned that Yamamoto's passion for German literature would negatively affect his perception of A Wan Smile's French undertones. After Yamamoto read the play in front of Kishida during a dinner together, he praised the text for its originality compared to current Japanese plays.

With renewed confidence, Kishida was determined to reignite his original playwriting aspirations. However, the Great 1923 Kanto Earthquake caused extensive damage throughout Tokyo and nearly decimated all of the city's theatre venues. To acquire an alternative income, Kishida opened a French-language school, The Moliere School, named in honor of the 17th Century playwright who Copeau regularly staged.

Yamamoto assisted Kishida in launching his playwriting career when he created the theatre magazine Engeki Shincho (New Currents of Drama). The magazine's objective was to highlight the latest developments in Japanese theatre, and Kishida's A Wan Smile (retitled Old Toys) was published in the magazine's March 1924 issue.

Subsequently, Kishida's expansive knowledge of French and European dramaturgy led to his involvement in multiple theatre journals and magazines where he submitted essays and reviews on Japanese theatre, including Bungei Shunju (Literary Annals) and Bungei Jidai (Literary Age). Combined with his concurrent playwriting pursuits, Kishida swiftly became an influential figure in the Japanese drama community.

The Tsukiji Little Theatre opened in Tokyo in 1924, and it marked a significant shift in Japanese theatre for its focus on avant-garde, European plays as opposed to kabuki and noh. Kishida was asked to submit a review of the Tsukiji's opening night plays. He went with an open mind to assess how these plays reflected current trends in Japanese drama, especially as he became aware of the theatre director Kaoru Osanai's progressive and controversial decision to only stage Western plays. He hoped to establish a partnership with Osanai in which he could utilize his firsthand knowledge and exposure to European theatre to assist in the production of the Tsukiji's plays. The opening night's performances were Japanese-translated adaptations of Chekhov's Swan Song, Emile Mazaud's The Holiday, and Reinhard Goering's A Sea Battle.

Despite his admiration for European theatre, Kishida published a scathing review of the three performances and Osanai's leadership. He rebuked the performances as weak and chastised the theatre for investing too much money into the stage designs instead of formal training for the actors. As a Japanese translation and interpretation of European works, Kishida wrote the stagings of these distinctly non-Japanese works were ineffective and hastily conceived. Consequently, he added this rendered the narratives far too difficult for the Japanese audience to comprehend. Perhaps the most damning component of Kishida's criticism was an entire section where he lambasted Osanai's personality as "pretentious and dogmatic".

The published review resulted in a highly contentious relationship between Kishida and Osanai. It contributed to the latter's decision to never stage work by Kishida at the Tsukiji Little Theatre.

The failure of the Tsukiji's opening night performances to move Kishida demonstrated his much broader dissatisfaction with the state of Japanese theatre. He felt that traditional performances of kabuki and noh were dated and that Japanese attempts at Western drama were mere imitations. Armed with a wealth of knowledge, experience, and creative inspiration accrued during his European residency, Kishida deemed it imperative for Japanese theatre to pursue more serious, psychological narratives and to strengthen performers' acting abilities.

For the second half of the 1920s, Kishida devoted much of his time to writing plays that captured the theatrical ideals he sought for Japan. Primarily one-act stories, Kishida's first plays featured small groupings of characters (usually only two) set within private, domestic settings. The narratives revolved around relationships and other personalized issues between characters. He deliberately eschewed any social, political, and historical thematic overtones; this became a distinct attribute associated with Kishida's playwriting.

== New Theatre Research Institute (1926 - 1929) ==
In an effort to modernize and reform Japanese theatre, Kishida established the New Theatre Institute (Shingeki kenkyusho) in 1926. Together with the playwrights Iwata Toyoo and Sekiguchi Jiro, the Shingeki kenkyusho was an experimental academic institution intended to educate a younger generation of aspiring playwrights and actors on modern and more refined methods of theatrical composition and performance. However, the institution failed to arouse enthusiasm among the students as they did not fully grasp the lessons of Kishida and his associates. A lack of resources to fully elucidate Kishida's theatrical ideals for Japanese dramaturgy was the primary reason for its failure. The New Theatre Research Institute did not have experienced guest lecturers to speak in comparison to Copeau's access to countless theatre professionals. Moreover, the absence of skilled Western-style performances in Japan made it more challenging for students to apply their education to actual performances. Kishida attempted to remedy this issue through regular screenings of foreign film adaptations of Western plays; these supplemental resources were insufficient to properly educate students on modern acting and playwriting.

Although the Institute did not meet Kishida's expectations, he obtained a loyal protege with whom he collaborated for the rest of his life, Tanaka Chikao. He joined the Institute in 1927 while enrolled in Keio University and was lauded for his mastery of French literature, especially his comprehensive study of French dramaturgy and dialogue.

== The Tsukiji Theatre (1932 - 1936) ==
As Kishida attained increasing prominence in theatre and literary circles, he founded the Tsukiji Theatre (Tsukijiza) in 1932. In partnership with the husband-and-wife actors Tomoda Kyosuke and Tamura Akiko, the theatre operated as Kishida's first venue whose productions were firmly rooted in the attributes of Western dramaturgy.

Although Kishida's aim to stage Western productions appeared similar to Osanai's goal in the 1920s, Kishida did not want to employ actors whose performance styles were derived from the emotive expressiveness of kabuki.

The Tsukiji Theatre did not attract enough attention to sustain its performances as it coincided with a surge in rival theatre troupes. The popularity of companies such as the New Associated Drama Troupe (Shinkyo Gekidan) and The New Tsukiji Drama Troupe (Shin-Tsukiji Gekidan) overshadowed the work of Kishida and his associates.

The theatre disbanded in 1936, but Kishida immediately transitioned into a more popular venue, the Bungakuza.

== The Literary Theatre (1937 - 1954) ==
In 1937, Kishida co-founded The Literary Theatre (Bungakuza) with Iwata Toyoo and Michio Kato as a venue to stage Western plays. Although similar to the play selections of Osanai's Tsukiji Little Theatre, Kishida proceeded to stage productions that were thematically personal and individualized rather than social and political.

Kishida's expertise in French drama was a major determinant in the theatre's selection of celebrated playwrights: Roger Martin du Gard, Jules Romains, Jean-Victor Pellerin, Simon Gantillon, and Marcel Pagnol.

In 1938, Kishida joined the Pen butai (lit. "Pen corps"), a government organisation which consisted of authors who travelled the front during the Second Sino-Japanese War to write favourably of Japan's war efforts in China. He was sent to the southern front of the Marco Polo Bridge Incident in China in order to chronicle the conflict. Considered to be a “safe” literary figure by the increasingly oppressive Japanese government because of his introspective style and non-inflammatory political beliefs, Kishida detailed his travels in China in his book Jugun gojunichi (Following the Troops for Fifty Days).

However, Kishida's reputation among Japanese audiences suffered throughout the Second World War. Since Kishida's plays intentionally lacked political messages, he was one of only a few playwrights whose work was not censored by the right-wing government. In contrast to left-wing theatrical troupes, their overtly political, anti-Fascist positions led to their forced suppression and arrests by the police. Kishida's ostracization was further intensified by his membership in the ultra-right Imperial Rule Assistance Association (Taisei Yokusankai). This government-sponsored society stipulated its participants to comply with the State's policies. For Kishida, this meant he had to maintain the status quo through the continued staging of politically neutral plays that did not criticize the government nor espouse progressive ideas.

During the Occupation of Japan in the late-1940s and early-1950s, Kishida's newfound appreciation for modern American plays helped to quell tensions between the Japanese and the American military. Soldiers preferred shingeki theatre for its Westernized performances, storylines, and settings, and the staging of American works such as Tennessee Williams's A Streetcar Named Desire and Thornton Wilder's Our Town. Kishida's reputation for directing performances that were largely apolitical contributed to this period of calm. American forces did not favor kabuki and noh for their overt references to Japanese culture and history and were concerned these plays would regenerate nationalistic fervor.

While Western plays were highly favored at The Literary Theatre, Kishida did not follow Osanai's exclusive policy to stage only Western plays as he produced Japanese works, albeit ones that contained no political subtext. Among the Japanese playwrights whose works were featured, Kaoru Morimoto's Surging Waves was performed in October 1943 and The Life of a Woman in April 1945; it marked one of the first instances in which Kishida's reputation recovered among the Japanese in the Post-1945 period.

By the 1950s, Kishida and The Literary Theatre regularly encouraged staged works by younger, unknown playwrights. This openness to highlight modern Japanese drama launched the careers of a multitude of late-20th and early-21st Century playwrights: Kishida's protege Tanaka Chikao from The New Theatre Research Institute, Yukio Mishima, and Michio Kato.

== Theatre criticism ==
In addition to his roles as playwright and director, Kishida shaped Japanese drama's transition to modernization through the dozens of essays and reviews he published in multiple theatre journals and magazines, such as Bungei Shunju (Literary Annals) and Bungei Jidai (Literary Age).

Throughout the 1920s and 1930s, Kishida founded several new theatre publications to distribute articles, essays, and reviews in response to contemporary shifts in Japanese drama such as Tragedy and Comedy in 1928 and Gekisaku (Play Writing) in 1932.

== Views on Japanese Theatre ==
Throughout his life, Kishida criticized traditional Japanese theatre as an outdated mode of expression that was inferior to Western dramaturgy. He openly disliked kabuki's melodrama and emphasis on heightened emotions rather than subtlety and naturalism. Shimpa's attempt to theatricize modern life while retaining the emotionalism of kabuki was equally displeasing to him.

While not an enthusiast for noh, Kishida was not as vocal in his opposition compared to kabuki and shimpa. He considered noh as far too dissimilar from modern Japanese drama to the point where it was its own separate entity that would not interfere with the redesign of Japanese theatre.

Kishida once wrote about a kabuki performance he saw upon his return to Japan in 1923. Even after he described his powerfully moving experience and recounted the sense of joy that overcame him, Kishida acknowledged that dramatic modernization was still a necessity for Japan as he argued traditional theatre was too tied to the past and could not simultaneously look to the future.

== Kishida and Shingeki ==
Even though Kishida expressed innumerable qualms concerning the state of Japanese drama, he clarified that he did not want all of Japan's identity to be Westernized. However, he noted that the history of European theatre is entirely composed of disparate countries that influenced one another's playwriting and performance styles, to which he described it as "an amalgamation".

Beginning in the 1920s, Kishida concretized his vision for Shingeki (“New Drama/New Theatre”) as the ideal method to modernize Japanese theatre. Influenced by the European philosophical movements of Naturalism and Symbolism, works were meant to adopt Western-style theatre customs of naturalistic acting and deeply psychological narratives. As both an observer and a theatre director, Kishida mentioned the necessity of theatres to recognize the importance of forming a dynamic relationship between the playwright, stage, director, actors, and audience.

Kishida's decision to compose and feature plays centered around the lives of middle and upper-class characters was indicative of his preference to cater to educated, bourgeois audiences.

== Personal life ==
In 1927, Kishida married Murakawa Tokiko, and they had two daughters. After Tokiko died in 1942, close associates of Kishida remarked that he never fully recovered from his wife’s death.

Both of Kishida's daughters went on to pursue careers in the arts. Eriko (1929–2011) was a poet and writer of children's stories, and Kyoko (1930–2006) was an actress who made her debut in the 1950 staging of Fukuda Tsuneari's Typhoon Kitty.

== Death ==
Kishida died of a stroke in Tokyo during a dress rehearsal for a theatrical production with which he was associated on March 5, 1954.

== Style, Content, and Themes ==
=== Style ===
Between drama and comedic satire, Kishida wrote over 60 plays. When he first composed Old Toys and other earlier works, his plays began as short, one-act stories involving a small circle or pair of characters; often, these were labeled "sketch plays". One of the most famous of these short plays is Paper Balloon (1925), which follows a married couple engaged in playful banter as they conceive of a fictional scenario of how they would spend a Sunday.

Eventually, his narratives unfolded in complex, multi-act storylines with interweaving substories involving multiple characters. Ushiyama Hotel (1928) is set in a Japanese-run hotel in Haiphong, Vietnam, and it serves as the primary setting for the disparate residents and employees who each become embroiled in one another's personal lives.

Regarding scriptwriting, Kishida stressed the importance of dialogue as a major driving force in both narrative progression and character development and that it must be composed of beautiful, literary words.

=== Content ===
The central conflicts of the majority of his plays relate to personal, emotional, and psychological issues specific to individual characters and their relationships. These works are located in the domestic settings of middle and upper-class dwellings. For example, Mr. Sawa's Two Daughters (1935) is about the tense relationship between a government employee and his two adult daughters over the issues of familial secrecy and emotional irresponsibility.

Although largely uninterested in proletarian drama, a few of Kishida's plays featured major characters of lower social standing, as seen in Roof Garden (1926) and Mount Asama (1931).

=== Themes ===
Kishida was distinguished from his contemporaries for his lack of socio-political themes, primarily because his works were written and performed during times of internal political upheaval and international turmoil.

Space, time, memory, marriage, and irresponsibility are among the most prevalent themes within Kishida's corpus of work.

== Legacy ==
Kishida's modernization of the Japanese theatre was a slow and arduous process that did not fully flower until after his 1954 death. His transformational approach to playwriting and theatre acting developed over his lifetime and remains a staple of contemporary Japanese drama.

Copeau's directorial style and the influential Drama Purification Movement compelled Kishida to introduce natural and rhythmic dialogue to Japanese performers. The creative decision to have his characters speak with simple, everyday phrases helped move performers and playwrights away from deferring to high-brow dialogue that could alienate certain audiences.

As a multidisciplinary creative space, Kishida's equal emphasis on the theatre's literary and artistic values allowed him to apply elements of Western dramaturgy to construct more complex stref name=":10" />

== Death ==
Kishida died of a stroke in Tokyo during a dress rehearsal for a theatrical production with which he was associated on March 5, 1954.orylines and emotionally variable characters.

Kishida's career as a theatre director and management of The Literary Theatre introduced Japanese audiences to a number of European and American playwrights: Jean-Paul Sartre, Albert Camus, Jean Giraudoux, Jean Anouilh, Eugene Ionesco, Tennessee Williams, Anton Chekhov, Edmond Rostand, William Shakespeare, Thornton Wilder, Eugene O'Neill, et al.

The Literary Theatre continues to operate in Tokyo, but the venue no longer follows Kishida's strict policy of staging only politically neutral plays.

Kishida's openness to allow modern Japanese playwrights the opportunity to have their plays performed produced a slew of vastly diverse playwrights: Tanaka Chikao, Yushi Koyama, Kaoru Morimoto, Yukio Mishima, Sawako Ariyoshi, et al.

Since 1955, the annual Kishida Kunio Drama Award has been presented by the Hakusuisha publishing house to new playwrights who demonstrate an aptitude for groundbreaking theatrical composition, and it is regarded as Japan's most prestigious award for playwriting.

== Influences ==
The majority of Kishida's inspiration originates from his studies of European playwrights and directors: Jacques Copeau, Moliere, Jules Renard, William Shakespeare, Maurice Maeterlinck, Anton Chekhov, Pierre-Augustin Caron de Beaumarchais, Charles Vildrac, et al.

Despite his criticisms of Japanese theatre, Kishida cited three Japanese playwrights from the Taisho Era whom he believed made significant contributions to the modernization of Japanese dramaturgy:

- Kikuchi Kan for his emphasis on theme
- Yuzo Yamamoto for his deft understanding of plot structure
- Mantaro Kubota for his literary style

== Directorial credits ==
=== Select Plays Directed by Kishida ===
1926: Wire-Tapping by Kaneko Yobun at The New Theatre Society

1927: Hazakura (The Cherry Tree in Leaf), by Kunio Kishida at The New Theatre Society

1927: La paix chez soi (Peace at Home) by Georges Corteline at The New Theatre Society

1932: La paix chez soi (Peace at Home) by Georges Corteline at The Teatro Comedie

1938: La paix chez soi (Peace at Home) by Georges Corteline at The Literary Theatre

1938: Monsieur Badin at The Teatro Comedie

1938: Fish Tribe by Yushi Koyama

1938: Akimizumine by Naoya Uchimura

1940: Gears by Naoya Uchimura

1948: Woman Who Eats Dreams by Akira Nogami

1950: Doen Karan by Kunio Kishida

1954: The Lower Depths by Maxim Gorky

== Publications ==
=== Essay collections ===
1940: Engeki no bonshitsu (The Essence of Drama)

1951: Engeki ippan kowa (General Talks on the Theatre)

=== Essays ===
1925: “Mikansei na gendai geki” (“The Incomplete Modern Theatre”)

1925: “Gikyoku izen no mono” (What Comes before the Play”)

1935: “Egekiron no ippoko” (“One Direction for Dramatic Theory”)

1935/1936: “New Movements on the Stage”

“Bungaku ka gikyoku ka?” (“Literature or Drama?”)

“Engeki honshitsuron no seiri” (“Some Amendments to the Essence of Dramatic Theory”)

“Gekidan ankoku no ben” (“Some Words on the Gloomy State of the Theatre Companies”)

“Gekido kyusai no hitsuyo” (“The Need to Reclaim the Art of the Theatre”)

“Gekijo to kankyakuso” (“Theatres and Spectators”)

“Gekisaku ni tsugu” (“Concerning Playwriting magazine”)

“Gekiteki engekiron ni tsuite” (“Concerning Contemporary Dramatic Theory”)

“Gikyoku izen no mono” (“Before the Play”)

“Gikyoku no seimei to engekibi” (“The Life of the Drama and the Beauty of the Theatre”)

“Gikyoku oyobi gikyoku sakka ni tsuite” (Concerning Drama and Dramatic Writers”)

“Gikyokushu Asamayama ni tsuite” (Concerning the drama anthology Mount Asama”)

“Gikyokushu fuzokujihyo ni tsuite” (“Concerning the drama anthology A Commentary on Manners”)

“Gikyokushu saigetsu ni tsuite” (“Concerning the drama anthology A Space of Time”)

“Kabuki geki no shorai” (“The Future of kabuki Drama”)

“Kankyakuso to shingeki no shukumei” (“Audiences and the Destiny of the New Theatre”)

“Kishida Kunio shu ni tsuite” (“Concerning a Collected Volume of My Work”)

“Kore kara no gikyoku” (“The Drama from Now On”)

“Mikansei na gendai geki” (“The Incomplete Modern Theatre”)

“Osanai kun no gikyokuron” “The Dramatic Theory of Osanai”)

“Pommes cuites o nageru” (“Throwing Cooked Apples”)

“Sendosei banno” (“Almight Agitation”)

“Serifu toshite no nihongo” (“The Japanese Language in Dramatic Dialogue”)

“Shanhai de senshi shita Tomoda Kyosuke kun” (“The Death of Tomoda Kyosuke, fallen in battle in Shanghai”)

“Shibai to boku” (“The Drama and Me”)

“Shibai to kenbutsu” (“The Drama and Entertainment”)

“Shibai to seikatsu” (“The Drama and Our Daily Life”)

“Shimpa geki to shimpa haiyu” (“Shimpa drama and shimpa actors”)

“Shingekikai no bunya” (“Types of New Theatre”)

“Shingeki kyokai no butai keiko” (“A Rehearsal of the New Theatre Society”)

“Shingeki no kankyaku shokun e” (“To my Friends, the New Theatre audiences”)

“Shingeki no kara” (“The Husk of the New Theatre”)

“Shingeki no shimatsu” (“The State of the New Theatre”)

“Shingeki no tame ni” (“For the Sake of the New Theatre”)

“Shingeki no undo no futatsu no michi” (“Two Roads for the New Theatre Movement”)

“Shingeki to musume Kyoko” (“The New Theatre and my daughter Kyoko”)

“Shingeki undo no ikkosatsu” (“One Consideration for the New Theatre Movement”)

“Shinkokugeki no okujoteien o mite” (“Roof Garden in a Performance by the Shinkokugeki Troupe”)

“Tsukiji shogekijo no hataage” (“The Launching of the Tsukiji Little Theatre”)

“Tsukijiza no mama sensei (“Professor Mama at the Tsukijiza”)

“Wakakushi no engekiron ni tsuite” (“Concerning My Dramatic Theory”)

“Zoku kotoba kotoba kotoba” (“More Word, Words, Words”)

=== Lectures ===
1936: "Shibai to seikatsu" ("Plays and Life") – Presented at Meiji University

=== Magazines ===
1928 – 1929: Higeki kigeki (Tragedy and Comedy)

1932 – 1940: Gekisaku (Play Writing)

=== Plays ===
1924: Furui Omocha (Old Toys)

1924: Chiroru no aki (Autumn in the Tyrols)

1925: Buranko (The Swing)

1925: Kamifusen (Paper Balloon)

1926: Shu-u (Sudden Shower)

1926: Hazakaru (The Cherry Tree in Leaf)

1926: Mure de ichi ban kuri no ki (The Tallest Chestnut in the Village)

1926: Okujoteien (Roof Garden)

1927: Ochiba nikki (Diary of Fallen Leaves)

1928: Ushiyama Hotel

1930: Mama sensei to sono otto (Professor Mama and her Husband)

1931: Asamayama (Mount Asama)

1931: It Will Be Fine Tomorrow

1935: Shokugyo (Vocation)

1935: Sawa-shi no futari musume (Mr. Sawa’s Two Daughters)

1935: Saigetsu (A Space of Time)

1936: Fuzoku jihyo (A Commentary on Manners)

1943: A Warm Current

1948: Hayamizu Juku (Hayamizu Girls School)

1949: Adoration

Karai hakase no rinju (The Last Moments of Doctor Karai)

Shiitake to yuben (Mushrooms and Eloquence)

Koji-kun’s Visit Day

Absence

Rain Shower

Year

Doen Karan

Face

The World of Sound

Women’s Thirsty

=== Books ===
- Rakuyou nikki
- Jugun gojunichi (Following the Troops for Fifty Days)

=== Translations of French texts ===
1933: Poil de carotte by Jules Renard

1938: Farewell is Fun by Jules Renard

1939: Group of Fallen People by Henri-Rene Lenormand

1940: Burning Fire Okuri by Paul Elview

1947: The Police Chief’s an Easygoing Guy by Georges Courteline

== Adaptations ==
- The Good Fairy (善魔, Zenma) (1951) director Keisuke Kinoshita, based on his novel Zenma
- Sudden Rain (驟雨, Shūu) (1956) director Mikio Naruse, based on his play Shower
