= The Abe Clan (1995 film) =

1995 television film by Kinji Fukasaku

- Genre: Jidaigeki
- Based on: "Abe ichizoku" by Mori Ōgai
- Screenplay by: Kinji Fukasaku; Tsutomu Furuta; Tsutomu Yamazaki; Kōichi Satō; Keizō Kanie; Shōchiku Kabushiki Kaisha
- Story by: Mori Ōgai
- Directed by: Kinji Fukasaku
- Starring: Tsutomu Yamazaki; Kōichi Satō; Hiroyuki Sanada
- Narrated by: Nakamura Kichiemon II
- Country of origin: Japan
- Original language: Japanese

Production
- Producer: Seichi Ichiko
- Running time: 94 minutes

Original release
- Release: 1995

The Abe Clan (阿部一族, Abe ichizoku) is a 1995 Japanese historical television film directed by Kinji Fukasaku. It is an adaptation of the 1913 Japanese short story "Abe ichizoku" by Mori Ōgai, which had previously been adapted into a 1938 theatrical film directed by Hisatora Kumagai and released by Toho.

== Plot ==
The film is set during the Tokugawa period. Hosokawa Tadatoshi, feudal lord of the Higo Province, falls ill in the spring of the 18th year of the Kan'ei era. Tadatoshi and his son Mitsunao both forbid Tadatoshi's vassals from committing seppuku, yet after Tadatoshi's death his vassals one by one commit junshu loyalty suicide out of a sense of duty to their lord. The only one who obeys his lord's last wish is Abe Yaichi'emon. After he is treated as a coward by his comrades he also commits seppuku to honor his family. Mitsunao, who has succeeded his father and is now the new feudal lord, punishes the Abe clan for Yaichi'emon's failure to obey this order. The Abe clan shuts itself up in its manor in protest of the unfair treatment as Mituano's troops approach.

== Cast ==
- Tsutomu Yamazaki as Abe Yaichi'emon
- Kōichi Satō as Abe Yagobei
- Hiroyuki Sanada as Matashichirō
- Yumi Asō as Tae
- Mariko Fuji as O'ichi
- Renji Ishibashi as Hayashi Geki
- Keizō Kanie as Abe Gonbei
- Noboru Nakaya as Hosokawa Tadatoshi
- Tetta Sugimoto as Takeuchi Kazuma

== Production ==
The film is a television film adaptation of the 1913 short story "Abe ichizoku" by Mori Ōgai (translated into English under the titles "The Abe Family" as well as "The Abe Clan"), which was inspired by the junshi loyalty suicides committed by Russo-Japanese War hero General Nogi Maresuke and his wife on the day of the funeral of Emperor Meiji. The short story had previously been adapted as a 1938 theatrical film directed by Kumagai Hisatora and released by Toho, followed by three television adaptations broadcast in 1959, 1961, and 1993 before Fukasaku's production.

== Broadcast ==
The television film was broadcast in Japan on the Fuji Television show Friday Entertainment at 9:00 p.m. on November 24, 1995.

== Video release ==
The film was released on Region 1 DVD as part of the four-DVD collection 深作欣二監督 シリーズ1 (Fukasaku Kinji Works Vol.1) on Aug 23, 2003. The film was released on DVD in Japan by Japan Video Distribution (JVD) Co. Ltd. on January 24, 2004. A Director's Cut is available. The film is available from the library of the Humboldt University of Berlin, where it is recommended viewing for a lecture on Mori Ōgai within the Seminar for East Asian Studies. The Director's Cut of the film is available in the University of Hamburg library.

== Reception ==
The film was shown as part of the Historica Focus category for period films at the 7th Kyoto Historica International Film Festival, which described the film as "A true tragedy that happened within the Hosokawa clan during the early Edo era. The film captures various human reactions and the subtleties of the samurai's code. Director Kinji Fukasaku takes on the megaphone to turn Mori Ogai's historical novel into a piece of period entertainment. Tsutomu Yamazaki, Keizo Kanie and Koichi Sato take on the role to play out the tragedy of a vassal struggling to serve loyalty at the death of his lord. A masterpiece with a luxurious cast of veterans including Noboru Nakaya, Hiroyuki Sanada and Renji Ishibashi."
