= Kaoru Morimoto =

Japanese playwright (1912–1946)

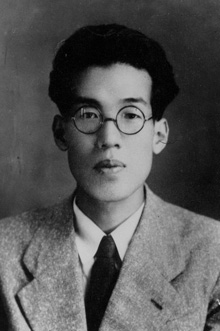
- Born: 4 June 1912; Osaka, Japan
- Died: 6 October 1946 (aged 34); Japan
- Education: Kyoto University
- Occupations: Playwright, screenwriter

Kaoru Morimoto (森本薫, Morimoto Kaoru; 4 June 1912 – 6 October 1946) was a Japanese playwright, screenwriter and translator. He is famous for his critically acclaimed play A Woman's Life (Onna no isshō), which became one of the most often performed plays in post-war Japan.

== Biography ==
Morimoto was born in Osaka, Japan, on 4 June 1912 and later moved to Kyoto, where he received a degree in English literature from Kyoto University in 1937. He published his first plays while still at university. During this time, he was a disciple of Kunio Kishida, one of the most prominent Japanese playwrights of the 20th century, as well as the main founder of Bungakuza theatre group. Migotona onna (1934), one of Morimoto's earliest plays, was published in the magazine Gekisaku ("Playwright"), edited by Kishida. In 1941, Morimoto joined the Bungakuza.

Morimoto's most famous play, A Woman's Life (1945), about a young woman who takes over the family's successful trading business that conducts trade with China, was written under the commission of the Japanese military authorities to justify Japan's expansionist policy against China. It was first performed in April 1945 in Tokyo where it was well received. After the end of World War II, Morimoto was convinced by a friend to revise the play to be compatible with the changed political atmosphere, making rewrites in particular in the opening and ending. The revised version was published in book form on 15 October 1946, nine days after Morimoto's death from tuberculosis, which he had been battling with for a long time. The play's staged versions, performed in Japan, China and Russia, saw additional changes made to Morimoto's text after his death.

Morimoto's plays were also adapted for film, in some cases with screenplay written by Morimoto himself. In addition, he wrote original scenarios for the screen. Fallen Blossoms (1938), based on his play and directed by Tamizō Ishida, another Bungakuza affiliate, is nowadays seen as one of the outstanding Japanese films of the 1930s.

Dotō (1944), based on the story of Japanese scientist Kitasato Shibasaburō, was performed by the New National Theatre in Tokyo as a part of their 1999–2000 season.

== Major works ==
- 1934: Wagaya (わが家, lit. "My home"), one act
- 1934: Ikka fū (一家風, lit. "Family style"), one act
- 1934: Migotona onna (みごとな女, lit. "A magnificent woman"), one act
- 1935: Hanabanashiki ichizoku (華々しき一族, lit. "Hanabanashiki clan"), three acts
- 1936: Ishō (衣装, lit. "Clothing"), one act
- 1941: Chin fujin, (陳夫人, lit. "Madam Chen"), adaptation of a work by Soichi Shoji, with Sumie Tanaka
- 1944: Ōgi (扇, lit. "Fan"), one act
- 1944: Dotō (怒濤, lit. "Raging waves"), five acts
- 1945: A Woman's Life, five acts

== Film adaptations ==
- 1938: Fallen Blossoms
- 1939: Mukashi no uta (also screenplay)
- 1944: Gekiryu (also screenplay)
- 1946: Ai no senkusha
- 1953: Aijin
- 1962: Life of a Woman
