= 1939 in film =

1939 is often rated by film historians as "the greatest year in the history of Hollywood". Hollywood studios were at the height of their Golden Age, producing a number of exceptional motion pictures, many of which became honored as all-time classic films. The ten films nominated for Best Picture at the 12th Academy Awards—Dark Victory, Gone with the Wind, Goodbye, Mr. Chips, Love Affair, Mr. Smith Goes to Washington, Ninotchka, Of Mice and Men, Stagecoach, The Wizard of Oz, and Wuthering Heights—range in genre and are considered classics. Hollywood produced a total of 527 feature films in 1939.

The Empire of Japan possessed a major national film industry in 1939, producing 582 films overall. Over the course of the year, the Film Law brought film production under the direct control of the Japanese government.

== Events ==
- February 15 – John Ford's Western film Stagecoach starring John Wayne premieres in New York City and Los Angeles.
- March 31 – Release of the 20th Century Fox film version of The Hound of the Baskervilles, first of a Sherlock Holmes film series starring Basil Rathbone as Sherlock Holmes and Nigel Bruce as Dr. Watson.
- June 10 – MGM's first successful animated character, Barney Bear, makes his debut in The Bear That Couldn't Sleep.
- July – Principal photography begins for Germany's first colour feature film, Women Are Better Diplomats, as Joseph Goebbels forces the use of the experimental Agfacolor process.
- August 10 – The Wizard of Oz premieres at the Orpheum Theatre in Green Bay, Wisconsin. Its Hollywood premiere takes place on August 15 at Grauman's Chinese Theatre in Los Angeles.
- October 1 – The Film Law goes into effect in Japan as Imperial Rescript no. 66.
- November 6 – Hedda Hopper's Hollywood, hosted by gossip columnist Hedda Hopper, is first broadcast on radio in the United States with; the show runs until 1951, making Hopper a powerful figure among the Hollywood elite.
- December 15 – The epic historical romance film Gone with the Wind, starring Vivien Leigh, Clark Gable, Olivia de Havilland and Leslie Howard, premieres at Loew's Grand Theatre in Atlanta, Georgia, with a three-day-long festival. Based on Margaret Mitchell's best-selling novel of 1936, it is the longest American film made up to this date (at nearly four hours) and rapidly becomes the highest-grossing film up to this time.
- Canada establishes a National Film Commission, predecessor of the National Film Board of Canada, with John Grierson as first Commissioner.

== Nominations for the Academy Award for Best Picture and Director ==
The year 1939 was one in which the Academy of Motion Picture Arts and Sciences nominated ten films for Best Picture:

- Dark Victory
- Gone with the Wind (Best Picture winner)
- Goodbye, Mr. Chips
- Love Affair
- Mr. Smith Goes to Washington
- Ninotchka
- Of Mice and Men
- Stagecoach
- The Wizard of Oz
- Wuthering Heights

These films came from a wide variety of film genres and sources for their stories and settings, including: historical fiction (Gone with the Wind), contemporary affairs (Mr. Smith Goes to Washington and Of Mice and Men), love stories, classic novels (Wuthering Heights), fantasies/musicals, (The Wizard of Oz), tragic plays (Dark Victory), westerns (Stagecoach), and comedies (Ninotchka).

Each of the five nominees for Best Director of 1939 were or went on to become a legendary film director with multiple acclaimed films to his credit: Frank Capra (previous winner of the award), Victor Fleming, John Ford (who won a record four Best Director awards), Sam Wood, and William Wyler (who leads all directors in nominations with 11 while having three wins).

== Academy Awards ==
- Best Picture: Gone with the Wind – David O. Selznick; Selznick International, MGM
- Best Director: Victor Fleming – Gone with the Wind
- Best Actor: Robert Donat – Goodbye, Mr. Chips
- Best Actress: Vivien Leigh – Gone with the Wind
- Best Supporting Actor: Thomas Mitchell – Stagecoach
- Best Supporting Actress: Hattie McDaniel – Gone with the Wind (first African-American to win an Academy Award)

Gone with the Wind received in all ten Academy Awards (eight competitive, two honorary) from thirteen nominations.

== Top-grossing films (U.S.) ==
The top ten 1939 released films by box office gross in North America are as follows:

Highest-grossing films of 1939
Rank	Title	Distributor	Domestic rentals
1	Gone with the Wind	MGM/Selznick International	$20,000,000
2	Mr. Smith Goes to Washington	Columbia	$3,500,000
3	Jesse James	20th Century Fox	$2,335,000
4	Babes in Arms	MGM	$2,311,000
5	The Wizard of Oz	MGM	$2,048,000
6	Goodbye, Mr. Chips	MGM	$1,777,000
7	Dodge City	Warner Bros.	$1,668,000
8	The Rains Came	20th Century Fox	$1,656,000
9	The Women	MGM	$1,610,000
10	Drums Along the Mohawk	20th Century Fox	$1,558,000

== Films by country/region ==
- List of American films of 1939
- List of Argentine films of 1939
- List of Brazilian films of 1939
- List of British films of 1939
- List of French films of 1939
- List of German films of 1939
- List of Egyptian films of 1939
- List of Hindi films of 1939
- List of Italian films of 1939
- List of Japanese films of 1939
- List of Marathi films of 1939
- List of Soviet films of 1939

== Serials ==
- Buck Rogers, starring Buster Crabbe
- Dick Tracy's G-Men, starring Ralph Byrd
- Daredevils of the Red Circle, starring Herman Brix and Charles B. Middleton
- Flying G-Men
- The Lone Ranger Rides Again
- Mandrake the Magician, starring Warren Hull
- The Oregon Trail
- Overland with Kit Carson
- The Phantom Creeps, starring Bela Lugosi
- Scouts to the Rescue
- Zorro's Fighting Legion, starring Reed Hadley

== Comedy film series ==
- Charlie Chaplin (1914–1940)
- Lupino Lane (1915–1939)
- Buster Keaton (1917–1944)
- Laurel and Hardy (1927–1945)
- Our Gang (1922–1944)
- The Marx Brothers (1929–1946)
- The Three Stooges (1934–1959)

== Animated short film series ==
- Krazy Kat (1925–1940)
- Mickey Mouse (1928–1953)
- Silly Symphonies (1929–1939)
  - The Practical Pig
  - The Ugly Duckling
- Looney Tunes (1930–1969)
- Terrytoons (1930–1964)
- Merrie Melodies (1931–1969)
- Scrappy (1931–1941)
- Betty Boop (1932–1939)
- Popeye (1933–1957)
- Color Rhapsodies (1934–1949)
- Donald Duck (1937–1956)
- Barney Bear (1939–1954)
- Walter Lantz Cartunes (also known as New Universal Cartoons or Cartune Comedies) (1938–1942)
- The Captain and the Kids (1938–1939)
- Goofy (1939–1955)
- Andy Panda (1939–1949)
- Nertsery Rhyme Cartoons (1939 only)
- Crackpot Cruise Cartoons (1939 only)
- Lil' Eightball (1939 only)
- Count Screwloose and J.R. (1939 only)

== Births ==
- January 4 – Burt Sugarman, American film producer
- January 8 – Ruth Maleczech, American actress (died 2013)
- January 9 – Susannah York, English actress (died 2011)
- January 10 – Sal Mineo, American actor (died 1976)
- January 17 – Maury Povich, American television personality
- January 22 – Sonny Chiba, Japanese actor and martial artist (died 2021)
- January 26 – Scott Glenn, American actor
- January 30 – János Zsombolyai, Hungarian cinematographer, film director and screenwriter (died 2015)
- February 3 – Michael Cimino, American director, producer and screenwriter (died 2016)
- February 6 – Mike Farrell, American actor
- February 9 – Janet Suzman, South African actress and director
- February 10 – Peter Purves, British actor and television presenter
- February 16 – Angelo Infanti, Italian actor (died 2010)
- February 20 – Antonina Girycz, Polish actress (died 2022)
- February 23 – Denis Arndt, American actor (died 2025)
- February 24
  - Marisa Mell, Austrian actress (died 1992)
  - Yoshiko Sakuma, Japanese actress
- February 28 – Tommy Tune, American dancer, choreographer and actor
- March 1 – David Weatherley, British-born New Zealand actor (died 2024)
- March 4
  - John Moreno, British actor
  - Robert Shaye, American actor and producer
  - Carlos Vereza, Brazilian actor
- March 5
  - Samantha Eggar, English actress (died 2025)
  - Benyamin Sueb, Indonesian actor, comedian and singer (died 1995)
- March 7 – Michael Chow, Chinese-born British-American former actor
- March 14
  - Raymond J. Barry, American actor
  - Héctor Bonilla, Mexican actor (died 2022)
- March 21 – Marino Masé, Italian actor (died 2022)
- March 24 - Lynda Baron, English actress (died 2022)
- March 26 - Phillip R. Allen, American actor (died 2012)
- March 28 – Vic Vargas, Filipino actor (died 2003)
- March 29 – Terence Hill, Italian actor, director, screenwriter and producer
- April 1 – Ali MacGraw, American actress
- April 5 – Roger Davis, American actor
- April 7 – Francis Ford Coppola, director; producer; screenwriter
- April 9 – Romeo Vasquez, Filipino actor (died 2017)
- April 11 – Louise Lasser, American actress, writer and director (died 2026)
- April 13 – Paul Sorvino, American actor (died 2022)
- April 22 – Mark Jones, English actor (died 2010)
- April 23
  - David Birney, American actor and director (died 2022)
  - Lee Majors, American actor
- May 4 – Paul Gleason, American actor (died 2006)
- May 7
  - Ruggero Deodato, Italian director and screenwriter (died 2022)
  - Marco St. John, American actor
- May 13 – Harvey Keitel, American actor
- May 15 – Barbara Hammer, American filmmaker (died 2019)
- May 18 – Hark Bohm, German actor, screenwriter and director (died 2025)
- May 19
  - James Fox, English actor
  - Nancy Kwan, Chinese-American actress
- May 22 – Paul Winfield, American actor (died 2004)
- May 23 – Reinhard Hauff, German film director
- May 25
  - Ian McKellen, English actor
  - Dixie Carter, American actress (died 2010)
- May 28 – Beth Howland, American actress (died 2015)
- May 30 – Michael J. Pollard, American actor (died 2019)
- May 31 - Jerry Ziesmer, American assistant director, production manager and actor (died 2021)
- June 4 – Henri Pachard, American film director (died 2008)
- June 8
  - Bernie Casey, American actor (died 2017)
  - Geoffrey Hutchings, English actor (died 2010)
  - Pat Laffan, Irish actor (died 2019)
- June 11 – Christina Crawford, American actress
- June 15 - Daniel Richter, American mime and actor
- June 20 - Peter MacDonald, English director, cinematographer and producer
- June 24 – Michael Gothard, English actor (died 1992)
- June 25 – Barbara Montgomery, American actress and director
- June 30 - John Fortune, English actor (died 2013)
- July 1
  - Karen Black, American actress, screenwriter and singer-songwriter (died 2013)
  - Ines Aru, Estonian actress
- July 5 – Sergio Di Stefano, Italian actor and voice actor (died 2010)
- July 14 – Sid Haig, American actor (died 2019)
- July 15
  - Abdulhussain Abdulredha, Kuwaiti actor (died 2017)
  - Patrick Wayne, American actor
- July 16 – Corin Redgrave, British actor, political activist (died 2010)
- July 21 – Sondra James, American sound coordinator and actress (died 2021)
- July 22
  - Gila Almagor, Israeli actress
  - Jennifer Bassey, American actress
- July 28 – Charles Cyphers, American actor (died 2024)
- July 30 – Peter Bogdanovich, American director, producer and screenwriter (died 2022)
- July 31 – France Nuyen, French actress
- August 1 – Terry Kiser, American actor
- August 2
  - Wes Craven, American director; producer; screenwriter (died 2015)
  - Robert Wall, American actor and martial artist (died 2022)
- August 4 – Mapita Cortés, Mexican actress (died 2006)
- August 6 - Steve Kahan, American character actor (died 2019)
- August 7 – Anjanette Comer, American actress
- August 9 – Bulle Ogier, French actress
- August 12
  - Oliver Ford Davies, English actor and writer
  - George Hamilton, American actor
- August 16 - Carole Shelley, English actress (died 2018)
- August 20 – Fernando Poe Jr., Filipino actor (died 2004)
- August 21 – Clarence Williams III, American actor (died 2021)
- August 23 – Fernando Luján, Mexican actor (died 2019)
- August 25 – John Badham, English-American director
- August 29 – Joel Schumacher, American film director, producer and screenwriter (died 2020)
- August 30 – Elizabeth Ashley, American actress
- September 1 – Lily Tomlin, American actress, comedian and producer
- September 5
  - William Devane, American actor
  - George Lazenby, Australian actor
- September 8 - DeVeren Bookwalter, American actor and director (died 1987)
- September 9 - Arthur Dignam, Australian actor (died 2020)
- September 10 – David Stratton, English-born Australian film critic and historian (died 2025)
- September 11 – Tom Dreesen, American actor and stand-up comedian (died 2026)
- September 13 – Richard Kiel, American actor and voice artist (died 2014)
- September 22 - Bette Bourne, British actor, drag queen, campaigner and activist (died 2024)
- September 23 – Janusz Gajos, Polish actor
- September 27 – Garrick Hagon, Canadian film, stage, television and radio actor
- September 28 - Sandra Dorsey, American actress (died 2023)
- September 29 – Werner Pochath, Austrian actor (died 1993)
- September 30 – Len Cariou, Canadian actor and director
- October 5 – Carmen Salinas, Mexican actress and comedian (died 2021)
- October 6 – Ellen Travolta, American actress
- October 8 – Paul Hogan, Australian comedian and actor
- October 10 - Laurel Cronin, American actress and singer (died 1992)
- October 13 – Melinda Dillon, American actress (died 2023)
- October 17 – Robert F. Lyons, American actor
- October 18 – Salme Poopuu, Estonian actress and filmmaker (died 2017)
- October 21 - Peter Vere-Jones, English-born New Zealand actor (died 2021)
- October 22 – Tony Roberts, American actor (died 2025)
- October 23
  - Stanley Anderson, American character actor (died 2018)
  - Edith Díaz, Puerto Rican actress (died 2009)
- October 24 – F. Murray Abraham, American actor
- October 25 – Nikos Nikolaidis, Greek film director (died 2007)
- October 27 – John Cleese, English actor, comedian and producer
- October 28 – Jane Alexander, American actress
- October 29 – Elizabeth Moody, English-born New Zealand actress and director (died 2010)
- October 31 – Ron Rifkin, American actor
- November 1 - Barbara Bosson, American actress (died 2023)
- November 8 – Meg Wynn Owen, Welsh actress (died 2022)
- November 10
  - Anton Gorchev, Bulgarian actor (died 2000)
  - Russell Means, Native American actor (died 2012)
- November 13 – G. R. Perera, Sri Lankan actor (died 2023)
- November 15 – Yaphet Kotto, American actor (died 2021)
- November 17 - Yuya Uchida, Japanese singer and actor (died 2019)
- November 18
  - Max Phipps, Australian actor (died 2000)
  - Brenda Vaccaro, American actress
- November 22 – Allen Garfield, American actor (died 2020)
- November 23 - Maria Gladys, Brazilian actress
- November 26
  - Mark Margolis, American actor (died 2023)
  - Tina Turner, American-born Swiss singer, songwriter and actress (died 2023)
- November 27 – Ulla Strömstedt, Swedish actress (died 1986)
- December 3 - Don Calfa, American character actor (died 2016)
- December 4 – Jimmy Hunt, American actor (died 2025)
- December 13
  - Eric Flynn, British actor (died 2002)
  - Akiko Wakabayashi, Japanese actress
- December 20 - Kathryn Joosten, American actress (died 2012)
- December 25 - Royce D. Applegate, American actor and screenwriter (died 2003)
- December 27 – John Amos, American actor (died 2024)
- December 28 – Gloria Manon, American actress (died 2018)

== Deaths ==
- January 10 – Jameson Thomas, 50, English actor, Chu-Chin-Chow, Extravagance
- January 19 – Tom Ricketts, 86, English actor, director, Love Bound, Thrill of Youth
- January 25 – Helen Ware, 61, American actress, Morning Glory, Abraham Lincoln
- February 22 – Joe Brandt, 56, American film producer and co-founder of C.B.C. which became Columbia Pictures
- April 22 – Ann Murdock, 48, American actress, Outcast, Please Help Emily
- May 5 – Clara Schønfeld, 82, Danish actress, Master of the House, Praesten i Vejlby
- June 6 – George Fawcett, 78, American actor, The Majesty of the Law, Chivalrous Charley, In Every Woman's Life
- June 9 – Owen Moore, 54, Irish actor, A Star is Born, She Done Him Wrong, The Red Mill, Cinderella
- August 23 – Sidney Howard, 48, American writer, Gone with the Wind, Dodsworth, Arrowsmith, A Lady to Love
- September 24 – Carl Laemmle, 72, German producer, Frankenstein, Dracula, Bride of Frankenstein, The Phantom of the Opera
- October 13 – Ford Sterling, 55, American actor, Tango Tangles, The Show-Off, Between Showers
- October 23 – Zane Grey, 67, American writer, Fighting Caravans, Riders of the Purple Sage, Western Union, Born to the West
- October 28 – Alice Brady, 46, American actress, My Man Godfrey, Young Mr. Lincoln, The Gay Divorcee, In Old Chicago
- November 7 – Kirsti Suonio, 67, Finnish stage and film actress, Substitute Wife
- November 13 – George Nicholls, Jr., 42, American director, Anne of Green Gables, Man of Conquest
- December 12 – Douglas Fairbanks, 56, American actor, The Thief of Bagdad, The Black Pirate, Robin Hood, Mr. Robinson Crusoe, and the father of Douglas Fairbanks, Jr.

== Film debuts ==
- Grace Arnold – Men Without Honour
- Raymond Bailey – Blackwell's Island
- Walter Baldwin – Those High Grey Walls
- Robert Beatty – Black Limelight
- Regina Bianchi – Rosa de Sangue
- Robert Blake – Bridal Suite
- Dirk Bogarde – Come on George!
- Linda Brent – Coast Guard
- Lillian Bronson – First Love
- Terezie Brzková – The Magic House
- Edgar Buchanan – My Son Is Guilty
- Rod Cameron – Heritage of the Desert
- William Challee – ...One Third of a Nation...
- Ada Colangeli – An Adventure of Salvator Rosa
- Richard Conte – Heaven with a Barbed Wire Fence
- Peter Cushing – The Man in the Iron Mask
- Carmen D'Antonio – Another Thin Man
- Linda Darnell – Hotel for Women
- Diana Dei – Follie del secolo
- Lupe del Castillo – United But Not Mixed
- Kathryn Adams Doty – Fifth Avenue Girl
- Charles Drake – Career
- Glenn Ford – My Son Is Guilty
- Greer Garson – Goodbye, Mr. Chips
- Dabbs Greer – Jesse James
- Anne Gwynne – Unexpected Father
- Faten Hamama – Happy Day
- Mary Beth Hughes – Within the Law
- Ben Johnson – The Fighting Gringo
- Jack Kelly – The Story of Alexander Graham Bell
- Veronica Lake – Sorority House
- Desmond Llewelyn – Ask a Policeman
- Bruni Löbel – Homeland
- Ruth Lommel – Drunter und drüber
- Jimmy Lydon – Back Door to Heaven
- Diana Lynn – They Shall Have Music
- Marcello Mastroianni – Marionette
- Victor Mature – The Housekeeper's Daughter
- Gerald Mohr – Society Smugglers
- Rina Morelli – An Adventure of Salvator Rosa
- Gene Nelson – Second Fiddle
- Edmond O'Brien – The Hunchback of Notre Dame
- David Opatoshu – The Light Ahead
- Hank Patterson – The Arizona Kid
- Isabel Randolph – The Women
- Dina Sassoli – Le père Lebonnard
- James Seay – Back Door to Heaven
- Florence Shirley – The Women
- Art Smith – Nancy Drew... Reporter
- Charles Smith – Nancy Drew... Reporter
- Robert Stack – First Love
- Robert Sterling – Blondie Meets the Boss
- Craig Stevens – Coast Guard
- Philip Van Zandt – Those High Grey Walls
- Brian Worth – Ask a Policeman
- Maris Wrixon – Off the Record
- Mahmoud Zulfikar – Apple Seller
