= Haruko Sugimura =

Japanese actress (1909–1997)

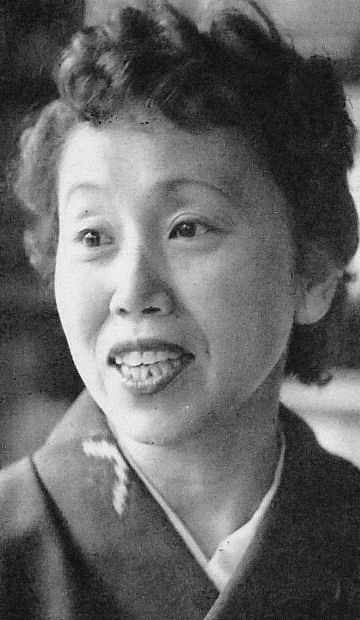
- Haruko Sugimura in May 1953
- Born: Haruko Nakano; January 6, 1909; Hiroshima, Japan
- Died: April 4, 1997 (aged 88); Tokyo, Japan
- Occupation: Actress
- Years active: 1927–1996

Haruko Sugimura (杉村 春子, Sugimura Haruko; January 6, 1909 – April 4, 1997) was a Japanese stage and film actress, best known for her appearances in the films of Yasujirō Ozu and Mikio Naruse from the late 1940s to the early 1960s.

== Biography ==
Sugimura was born in Naka-ku, Hiroshima. After the death of her parents, she was adopted at an early age by affluent lumber dealers, only learning much later that they were not her biological parents. (Sugimura reputedly claimed that she was the illegitimate child of a geisha.) Her adoptive parents took her to performances of both classical Japanese stage arts like kabuki and bunraku, and western ballet and opera. They also encouraged her to enroll at the Tokyo Ongaku Gakko (now Tokyo University of the Arts), where she failed the exams. She then joined the Tsukiji Shōgekijō (Tsukiji Little Theatre), Tokyo, in 1927, and later the Bungakuza theatre company, which she remained affiliated with from 1937 until her retirement in 1996.

She gave her film debut in 1932 in Eizo Tanaka's Namiko (1932). (Note: Although the Japanese Movie Database and Internet Movie Database list Yasujirō Shimazu's Asakusa no hi as Sugimura's film debut, she had previously appeared in a small role in Tanaka's Namiko.) Between 1937 and the end of the war, she acted in about 20 films, including works by directors Yasujirō Shimazu and Shirō Toyoda. Notable post-war film appearances were in Keisuke Kinoshita's Morning for the Osone Family (1946) and in Ozu's Late Spring (1949). Her most important film roles included that of Shige, the elderly couple's hairdresser daughter in Ozu's Tokyo Story (1953), Naruse's Late Chrysanthemums (1954), and Tadashi Imai's An Inlet of Muddy Water (1953). For her film performances, she received the Blue Ribbon Award, the Kinema Junpo Award and the Mainichi Film Award.

On stage, she was successful as Blanche Dubois in A Streetcar Named Desire (the first person to perform the role onstage in Japan), as Gertrude in Hamlet and as Asako Kageyama in Yukio Mishima's Rokumeikan. Her most popular and often repeated stage role was Kei Nunobiki in Kaoru Morimoto's A Woman's Life, for which she received numerous awards, including the Japan Art Academy Prize and the Asahi Prize. In 1992, she was awarded the honorary citizenship of the city of Tokyo. In 1995, she refused the Order of Cultural Merit award. The same year saw the release of her last film, Kaneto Shindō's A Last Note.

== Filmography ==
=== Film ===
- Namiko (1932)
- Asakusa no hi (1937)
- Uguisu (1938)
- Wedding Day (1940)
- Okumura Ioko (1940)
- Spring on Leper's Island (1940) – Yokogawa's wife
- Ōhinata-mura (1940)
- Waga ai no ki (1941)
- Shirasagi (1941)
- Jirō monogatari (1941)
- Nankai no hanataba (1942) – Nobuko Hotta
- Haha no chizu (1942) – Isano Kishi
- Gekiryu (1944)
- Army (1944) – Setsu
- Kanjōkai no bara (1945)
- Umi no yobu koe (1945)
- Ōsone-ke no ashita (1946) – Fusako Ōsone
- Urashima Tarō no kōei (1946)
- No Regrets for Our Youth (1946) – Madame Noge, Ryukichi's mother
- Yottsu no koi no monogatari (1947) – Yukiko's mother (episode 1)
- Joen (1947)
- Haru no mezame (1947)
- Sanbon yubi no otoko (1947) – Itoko
- Yuwaku (1948) – Tokie
- Te o tsunagu kora (1948)
- Idainaru X (1948) – Taka
- Toki no teizo: zengohen (1948)
- Kurogumo kaido (1948)
- Koku'un kaido (1948)
- Beni imada kiezu (1949)
- Yotsuya kaidan (1949) – Omaki
- Shinshaku Yotsuya kaidan: kōhen (1949) – Omaki
- Late Spring (1949) – Masa Taguchi
- Onna no shiki (1950)
- Until We Meet Again (1950) – Ono Suga
- Listen to the Voices of the Sea (1950) – Kohagi Nakamura
- Eriko to tomoni Part I + II (1951) – Harue Matsumura
- Jiyū gakkō (1951)
- Early Summer (1951) – Tami Yabe
- Fireworks Over the Sea (1951) – Kono Kujirai
- Repast (1951) – Matsu Murata, Michiyo's mother
- Inochi uruwashi (1951) – Mine Imura
- Seishun kaigi (1952) – Tamiyo
- Genroku suikoden (1952) – Onui
- Kaze futatabi (1952)
- Kin no tamago: Golden girl (1952) – Tsuruko Fujimura
- Wakai hito (1952)
- Senba zuru (1953) – Chikako Kurimoto
- Montenrupa: Bokyo no uta (1953)
- Kimi ni sasageshi inochi nariseba (1953)
- Tokyo Story (1953) – Shige Kaneko
- Life of a Woman (1953) – Tamae, Shintaro's mother
- An Inlet of Muddy Water (1953) – O-Hatsu (story 3)
- Geisha Konatsu (1954) – Raku Kamioka
- Late Chrysanthemums (1954) – Kin
- Shunkin monogatari (1954) – Oei
- Kunsho (1954)
- Meiji ichidai onna (1955) – Ohide
- Keisatsu Nikki (1955) – Moyo Sugita, a go-between
- Princess Yang Kwei-Fei (1955) – Princess Yen-chun
- Geisha Konatsu: Hitori neru yo no Konatsu (1955) – Raku Kamioka
- She Was Like a Wild Chrysanthemum (1955) – Masao's mother
- Aogashima no kodomotachi – Onna kyōshi no kiroku (1956) – Chie Yamada
- Early Spring (1956) – Tamako Tamura
- Yonjū-hassai no teikō (1956) – Satoko, Kotaro's wife
- Nagareru (1956) – Someka
- Onna no ashi ato (1956)
- The Crowded Streetcar (1957) – Otome, the mother
- Tokyo Twilight (1957) – Shigeko Takeuchi
- Kanashimi wa onna dakeni (1958) – Chiyoko
- Hana no bojō (1958) – Rie Ikegami
- Summer Clouds (1958) – Toyo
- Nemuri Kyōshirō burai hikae: Maken jigoku (1958) – Sonoe
- Good Morning (1959) – Kikue Haraguchi
- Bibō ni tsumi ari (1959) – Fusa Yoshino
- Anyakōro (1959) – Osai
- Kashimanada no onna (1959)
- The Three Treasures (1959) – Narrator
- Floating Weeds (1959) – Oyoshi
- Tenpō rokkasen – Jigoku no hanamichi (1960) – Okuma
- Musume tsuma haha (1960) – Kayo Tani
- Daughters, Wives and a Mother (1960) – Kayo Tani
- Ashi ni sawatta onna (1960) – Pickpocket Haruko
- Furyu fukagawata (1960)
- Banana (1960)
- Kutsukake Tokijirō (1961) – Oroku
- The End of Summer (1961) – Katou Shige
- Buddha (1961) – Vaidehi
- Hangyakuji (1961)
- Katei no jijō (1962) – Mrs. Yoshii
- Onna no za (1962) – Aki, Ishikawa-ke no gosai
- Ashita aru kagiri (1962)
- Musume to watashi (1962) – Kiyo Kitagawa
- The Outcast (1962) – School master's wife
- An Autumn Afternoon (1962) – Tomoko
- Kaigun (1963)
- Mother (1963) – Yoshie
- The Scent of Incense (1964) – Taromaru
- Akujo (1964) – Hatsu Mimura
- Kwaidan (1964) – Madame (story 4)
- Samurai Assassin (1965) – Tsuru
- With Beauty and Sorrow (1965) – Otoko's mother
- Red Beard (1965) – Kin, the madam
- Daikon to ninjin (1965)
- Dark the Mountain Snow (1966) – Ine's mother
- Jinchoge (1966) – Aki Ueno, Daphne
- Hanaoka Seishū no tsuma (1967) – Narrator
- Hitorikko (1969)
- Kaseki no mori (1973)
- Akumyo: shima arashi (1974) – Ito
- Kaseki (1974) – Mother-in-law
- Bokuto kidan (1992) – Kafu's mother
- A Last Note (1995) – Yoko Morimoto

=== Television (selected) ===
- Sekigahara (1981) - Kita no mandokoro

== Awards (selected) ==
- 1948: Japan Art Academy Prize for A Woman's Life
- 1951: Blue Ribbon Awards for Best Supporting Actress for Repast and Early Summer
- 1954: Mainichi Film Concours Best Supporting Actress for An Inlet of Muddy Water and Tokyo Story
- 1968: Asahi Prize for A Woman's Life
- 1974: Person of Cultural Merit
- 1996: Mainichi Film Concours Best Actress for A Last Note
- 1996: Kinema Junpo Awards for Best Actress for A Last Note
- 1998: Mainichi Film Concours Special Award
- 1998: Japanese Academy Prize Special Award
