= Composition Class =

1938 Japanese film

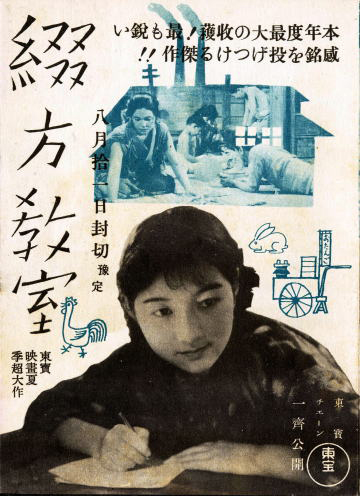
- Theatrical release poster

Japanese name
- Kanji: 綴方教室
Transcriptions
- Revised Hepburn: Tsuzurikata Kyoshitsu
- Directed by: Kajirō Yamamoto
- Produced by: Nobuyoshi Morita
- Starring: Hideko Takamine; Masaru Kodaka; Shiro Mizutani; Musei Tokugawa; Nijiko Kiyokawa; Osamu Takizawa; Ranko Akagi; Masao Mishima; Noriko Honma; Kumeko Otowa; Takahiro Yamagata; Toshiko Itō
- Cinematography: Akira Mimura
- Edited by: Koichi Iwashita
- Music by: Tadashi Ota
- Production company: Toho
- Distributed by: Toho
- Release date: August 21, 1938
- Running time: 87 minutes
- Country: Japan
- Language: Japanese

Composition Class (Japanese: 綴方教室, Hepburn: Tsuzurikata Kyoshitsu) is a 1938 Japanese drama film directed by Kajirō Yamamoto and starring Hideko Takamine in a child acting role. Akira Kurosawa, then the apprentice of Kajirō Yamamoto, is credited as the film's chief assistant director.

== Plot ==
Masako Toyoda is a sixth-grade schoolgirl living with her parents and brothers in the slums of the Katsushika Ward of Tokyo. Her father, a struggling tinsmith, suggests she leave school and become a geisha after the home receives an eviction letter. He berates her for being unable to read it.

In class, Masako follows the advice of her teacher, Mr. Oki, to write honestly and be mindful of small details. While Masako develops her writing skills, her family life is precarious: her mother hesitates to buy stationery, and her father arrives home drunk after agreeing to a loan with an expensive payment plan.

Masako's teacher remarks to his wife about the poor girl from his class who nevertheless writes creative, well-observed turns of phrase, such as her father "bending as if to tie his sandals" to catch and slaughter a chicken. During the summer break, the Toyodas receive pet rabbits from a neighbour who criticises her landlords, the Umemoto family, as miserly. Masako writes an essay about the experience of raising rabbits, which is published in the children's magazine Akai tori.

It is revealed that the comments about the Umamotos have been included in the published piece; the Umemotos themselves turn out to be an influential, notable family. Mrs. Umemoto confronts Masako for humiliating her daughter. Masako's mother punishes her also, expecting Mr. Umemoto to ruin her father's career.

Feeling guilty, Mr. Oki visits the Toyodas and Umemotos to take responsibility for the essay's contents. He comes to regret holding composition classes after he learns that Mr. Umemoto has stopped doing business with the Toyodas. The Toyodas rely on welfare after suffering a series of unrelated misfortunes: their bicycle is stolen and the father is forced to seek casual labour in the aftermath of a flood. On New Year's Eve, he comes home drunk complaining about his loan repayments. He criticises his own naivety and honesty before entering a brief public rage.

Masako's mother broaches once more the idea of quitting school to become a geisha, which she refuses. At school, Mr. Oki expresses concerns that she has become too depressed to write; Masako breaks down in tears while he reads the private writings on her desk. While he discusses Masako with his wife, Masako's mother visits their house to thank them for finding Masako's father a steady construction job.

Masako takes part in the school's graduation ceremony. As she walks with Mr. Oki and classmates, she talks about her plans to work at a nearby factory and her intentions to continue writing.

== Cast ==
- Hideko Takamine as Masako
- Masaru Kodaka as Minori
- Shiro Mizutani as Mitsuo
- Nijiko Kiyokawa as Oyuki, Masako's mother
- Musei Tokugawa as Shozaburo Yama, Masako's father
- Osamu Takizawa as Mr. Oki
- Ranko Akagi as Mrs. Oki
- Masao Mishima as Mr. Tanno
- Atsuko Homma as Oba-san
- Akiko Miyagawa as Orie-chan
- Kumeko Otowa as Second Wife
- Hisae Hirata as Second Wife's Sister
- Tenyo Yamagata as Mr. Umemoto
- Tomoko Ito as Mrs. Umemoto

== Production ==
Composition Class is based on a 1937 collection of the childhood autobiographical essays of Masako Toyoda.

Akira Kurosawa writes that the role of "chief assistant director" entailed second-unit directing as well as film editing and dubbing.

== Themes ==
In his history of Japanese "Kulturfilms", Peter B. High analyses Composition Class in terms of "socialized perception" (Shakaiteki chikaku) and the force of community opinion (seken), particularly in relation to the powerful Mr. Umemoto. The teacher becomes regretful on realising that "even the naive veritism of a child's essay can threaten the system of values vigorously policed by community opinion". High reads these scenes as a warning to the real-life pedadogical movement towards composition classes, which was to face political suppression in the years following the film's release.

== Reception ==
Composition Class was "immensely popular" on release in Japan, ranking fifth in the running for Kinema Junpo Award for Best Film of the Year in 1938.

Joseph Anderson and Donald Richie use Composition Class as an example of the genre of shomin-geki in pre-war Japanese cinema, while criticising its "slick, obvious" storytelling.
