= Tanaka Chikao =

Japanese playwright and dramatist

- Born: 10 October 1905; Nagasaki, Japan
- Died: 29 November 1995 (aged 90)
- Education: Tokyo University
- Occupations: Playwright, director, dramatist, poet
- Writing career
- Genre: Shingeki

Chikao Tanaka (田中 千禾夫, Tanaka Chikao; 1905-1995) was a Japanese playwright and dramatist whose plays focused on the mental, physical, and religious hardships of post-World War II Japan.

Tanaka's writing differed greatly from that of other Japanese playwrights at the time because he wrote of essential human conflicts through the eyes of a Christian, which was atypical of the majority of his countrymen. His word structure and dramatic style creates an intense and lyrical force which has been satisfying for many theater enthusiasts, both to his own audiences and to foreign audiences as well. Tanaka is perhaps the first modern Japanese playwright about whom this can be said. He is notable for his play Head of Mary (1959) and his expanded dramatic structures that convey metaphysical, spiritual, and existential themes in the form of masterful, rhythmic dialogue.

== Life and work ==
=== Life and influences ===
Tanaka was born in 1905 in the culturally diverse city of Nagasaki, Japan where his father practiced medicine. His father was a scholar and could fluently read Chinese kambun. He would constantly make young Tanaka read Chinese literature as a primary school student. This became the first major influence in the way Tanaka composed his later plays, because, as he described it, "Reading in that fashion produces in you a sense of rhythm: consciousness and resilience. That sense of rhythm has remained behind in me, and I feel it has had some effect on the way I compose my own plays".

At the time, Nagasaki was considered a city that had one of the longest cosmopolitan traditions in Japan. Hundreds of families in Nagasaki were able to freely conduct public rituals of Christianity. The presence of these people in Nagasaki gave a peculiar flavor, in speech and in attitude, to the psychology of the region.

These Western influences and ideologies interested Tanaka and other intellectually minded students of the time. He became so interested in Western ideas that in 1923 he became a student at Tokyo University and studied French literature. As a student, he joined many small troupes in attempts to try his hand in acting. Finally, in 1927 after not much success, he joined Shingeki Kenkyusho (‘New Theater Research Institute’) in hopes of better understanding Westernized theater. The theater was led by Kunio Kishida who is regarded as one of the most prominent Japanese dramatists and writers of the early 20th century. Kishida was fluent in French and had an excellent grasp on European dramaturgy.

Impressed and influenced by his instructor, Tanaka began reading French literary works, most of which were full of fanciful and poetic dialogue. After the demise of the Shingeki Kenkyusho Institute in 1929, Tanaka composed a short play titled Ofukuro ('ma' or 'mom') which became a great success. Seemingly overnight, Tanaka was thrown into the spotlight as a promising dramatist. However, this promise was short-lived, as he struggled to produce any meaningful works after the success of Ofukuro. It wasn't until after the bomb dropped on Nagasaki on August 8, 1945, that Tanaka produced the outpouring of work that he is most known for today.

The complete desolation of Nagasaki was the most influential moment in the molding of the dramatist that Tanaka became. He felt strongly about the ironic relationship of the destruction by the West of the city that came the closest to penetrating the very essence of Western culture due to the adoption of Christianity by so many of its citizens. He felt that the detonation of the atomic bomb had been the ruination of everything his father's generation had stood for and built. In a sense, with the fall of Nagasaki and its spiritual and religious traditions, Tanaka seemed to have rediscovered his own cultural and spiritual background, which he successfully and dramatically conveyed to the audience of his plays.

=== Head of Mary ===
First performed in 1959, Head of Mary: A Nagasaki Fantasia (Maria no Kubi: Nagasaki Gensokyoku), written by Tanaka Chikao, is a Roman Catholic drama about survivors of the atomic bombing of Nagasaki. The play is a rhythmic allegory of the effort by Christians in Nagasaki to reconstitute their faith after the destruction of the Urakami Cathedral on August 9, 1945. It is also a comprehensive metaphor for the difficulties of rebuilding faith after the terrors of the early 20th century.

The play tells the story of a group of survivors who plot to steal a statue of Mary so that they may rightfully restore their faith. The group is led by Shika, a woman who works as a nurse by day and a prostitute by night. However, she faces opposition as some believe that time would be better spent through political activism in an effort to ban atomic bombs. Shika does not sway; she stands her ground and says that absolute justice is what she craves, and only God can provide that. In the last scene of the play, Shika and her co-conspirators struggle to move the head of Mary, the last remaining piece of the icon. They fail, but the head suddenly speaks to them: “I'll let you suckle at my breast. I'll let you drink to your hearts’ content. My milk is so sweet, oh so sweet! First drink, then I'll listen to your prayers. So come, come!" It is the nurturing voice of softness, but the head does not budge. In the end, Shika and her group are unsuccessful in moving the head, but the efforts to reconstruct their faith, although incomplete, are rewarded.

=== Other major works ===
Kyoiku ('Education') is a short one-act play composed in 1953 for the Haiyuza ('Actor's Theater'). The play is French in tone and reflects the lasting influences Tanaka picked up from his final years with Kishida. The characters have French names, and the play is filled with references to French culture. It is famous for its intense poetic dialogue that far exceeds the everyday dialogue produced by naturalistic characters. Education is also known for the successive layers of exhilaration and ambiguity that drive the drama forward.

Chidori ('Plover') is the name of the young girl in this play composed by Tanaka in 1960. It was almost as successful as Head of Mary, with Christian elements present but less apparent than in Head of Mary. The structure of Chidori is less realistic and more festive and mystical than many of Tanaka's other works. However, the dialogue is much more realistic than his traditional poetic configuration. Instead of the intense poetic sequences seen in much of his usual work, sequences of dreams and the fluctuation between the present and memory give this play the dramatic pattern that Tanaka is known for.

Arai Hakuseki (1968) is a Japanese historical play focused on the confrontation between Japanese and Christian thought. It portrays famous statesman and scholar Arai Hakuseki (1657-1725) and the various political engagements he encountered. This play focuses on the metaphysical world, rather than the realistic, to give the audience a clearer sense of ideas rather than emotion. Since this play is historical, it serves his purpose perfectly.
