= A Woman's Life (play) =

A Woman's Life (Onna no isshō, 1945), is the most famous play by Kaoru Morimoto and was the most frequently staged play during postwar Japan. Consisting of seven scenes and five acts, A Woman's Life tells the story of Kei as she grows from a young girl into a successful businesswoman. The play was commissioned as propaganda by the Japanese military in 1945 and was first staged later that year by the Literary Theatre (Bungakuza). Before dying, Morimoto rewrote the first and last scenes in order for the play to remain relevant after the war.

== Synopsis ==
The play begins in 1905 on New Year's Day with Kei as a young orphan living with her abusive aunt. Japan is elated by their recent victory over Russia in the fall of Port Arthur. On her sixteenth birthday, Kei runs away from her aunt's house and wanders into the yard of the Tsutsumis, a wealthy family involved in the trade business with China. The family is celebrating Shizu's birthday, the mother of the family whose late husband began the family trade business. However, at the time of Kei's arrival, the business is being run by Shizu and her brother, Shōsuke. Upon hearing Kei's story, Shizu sympathizes with the young girl and allows Kei to stay in their house as a maid. As the years go by, Kei displays a genuine passion for the trade business and wins the trust of Shizu, who asks her to marry her oldest son, Shintarō, in hopes of saving the family trade business Shizu fears her son will be unable to maintain. Unlike the passion Kei displayed for trade, Shintarō was interested in Chinese literature and dreamed of one day becoming a teacher of Chinese. Despite Kei secretly being in love with Shintarō's younger brother Eiji, she decides to abide by Shizu's wishes and abandons her side romance. Kei marries Shintarō and after Shizu's death, Kei is left operating Tsutsumi family affairs, as well as the family trade business. Later, differing views on Japan's policy with China drives a wedge between Kei and Shintarō, and the gap between them grows even deeper once Shintarō discovers Kei's short-lived romance with Eiji. However, when Eiji returns to the house and tells Kei of his activism and radical left-wing views, he is turned into the police by Kei herself. The act of betraying her uncle causes Kei's daughter Chie to leave her mother's house to live with Shintarō, her father. The play ends when that winter, Shintarō visits Kei at her house unexpectedly. While the two are reacquainting, Shintarō falls dead into Kei's arms.

== Historical Context ==
A Woman's Life was one of two literary works commission by the Japanese military during World War II, the other being Osamu Dazai's novel Regretful Parting (Sekibetsu, 1945). The play was initially meant to be a work of propaganda glorifying Japan's strong presence in China during the war. The play was commissioned in the hopes of promoting the five principles of cooperation decided upon at the Greater East Asia Conference held in Tokyo earlier.

=== Adaptation ===
A Woman's Life was initially meant to be a work of propaganda glorifying Japan's strong presence in China during the war, and the people of Japan received the play well. The play was commissioned by Japanese military authorities in the hopes of promoting the five principles of cooperation decided upon at the Greater East Asia Conference held in Tokyo. The part of Kei was written for Haruko Sugimura, a close colleague of Morimoto during the war and the most famous Bungakuza actress at the time. The Great East Asian War ended only months after the play was first staged and in early 1946, Morimoto rewrote the first and last scenes to, "make the play compatible with the post-war political atmosphere." Because China was no longer the focus it was during the war, the play was changed by Morimoto to become more about Japan's strength and resilience after the war. At the time these alterations to A Woman's Life were being made, Morimoto was suffering from tuberculosis died later that year, just a few months after his new version of the play was published into book form.

== Public Reception ==
=== Japan ===
A Woman's Life was received well by the people of Japan and would later be described as, "'one of [Japan's most] representative post-war plays.'" Unlike Regretful Parting, the only other literary work commissioned alongside A Woman's Life, Morimoto's play remained popular even after the end of World War II and is still read and performed in Japan today. The success of the play in Japan may be due, in part, to the play's roots in nationalist propaganda

=== International ===
After World War II, A Woman's Life gained recognition in China and was received well there, despite the play's original political assertions. The play was even translated into Chinese and performed overseas. Later, the play would receive recognition in Russia as well. In 1959, A Woman's Life was performed at the Mayakovsky Theatre in Moscow. The Russian translation of the play was titled, Stolen Life. The role of Ninobiki was played by Maria Babanova, a famous actress of the time, and the director was a young Japanese man by the name of Yoshiki Okada.

== Production history ==
Morimoto finished the manuscript for A Woman's Life in February 1945 and the play was first directed by Mantarō Kubota and performed in Tokyo by the Bungakuza in April of that same year. World War II had not ended by the time it was staged and the sound of an air-raid alarm could be heard for the duration of the performance. Originally, the play was to be performed at the Tsukiji Little Theatre, but the location changed after the building was destroyed in a bombing. The role of Kei was written for Haruko Sugimura, a close colleague of Morimoto during the war, as well as the most famous Bungakuza actress of the time. Before her death in 1997, Sugimura had performed the play around 950 times. Later, the role of Kei was taken over by Yoshie Taira and Yuki Shoda.
