= Fallen Blossoms =

1938 Japanese film

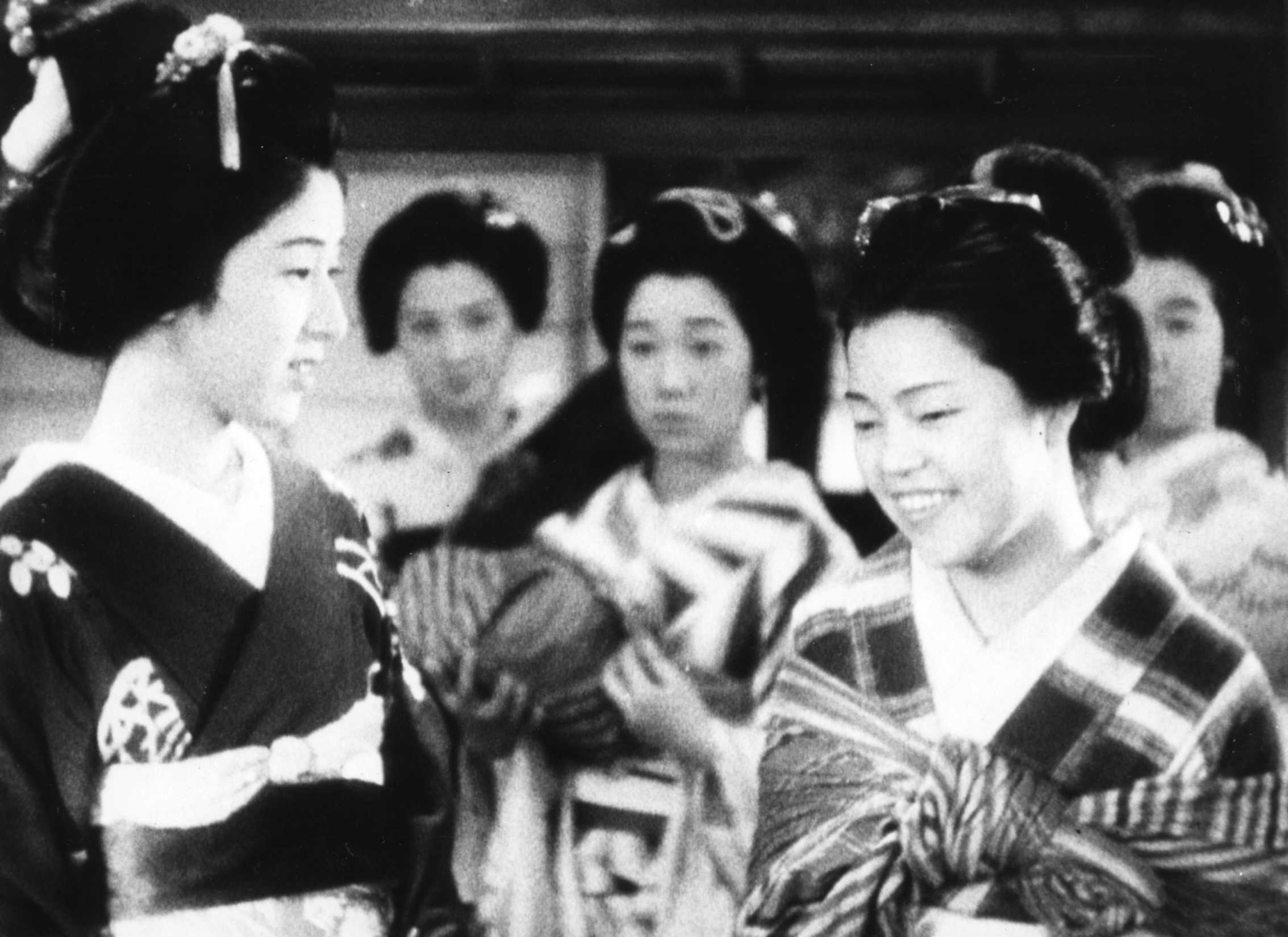
- Ranko Hanai and Kimiko Hayashi
- 花ちりぬ
- Directed by: Tamizō Ishida
- Written by: Shirō Yamamoto; Kaoru Morimoto (play)
- Produced by: Kontaibo Goro
- Starring: Ranko Hanai; Reiko Minakami; Rikie Sanjō
- Cinematography: Harumi Machii
- Edited by: Yoshio Ehara
- Music by: Senji Itō
- Production company: Toho
- Distributed by: Toho
- Release date: 15 June 1938 (Japan)
- Running time: 75 minutes
- Country: Japan
- Language: Japanese

Fallen Blossoms (花ちりぬ, Hana Chirinu), also titled Flowers Have Fallen and The Blossoms Have Fallen, is a 1938 Japanese drama film directed by Tamizō Ishida, based on a play by Kaoru Morimoto.

== Plot ==
Set within a Kyoto geisha house against the backdrop of the 1864 Kinmon incident, the film follows the lives and relationships of the women who work there, while battles rage in the streets outside as rebel factions attempt to restore the emperor's reign. Akira, daughter of the house's madam Tomi, hopes to escape her milieu with the help of a young samurai rebel whom she met. After the women witness a killing at their front door, Tomi is taken away for an interrogation by the shogunate's secret police and does not return. In the end, the women leave the house, with only Akira left behind, who realises that she may never see her mother and her lover again.

== Cast ==
- Ranko Hanai as Akira
- Reiko Minakami as Tanehachi
- Rikie Sanjō as Tomi, Akira's mother
- Kimiko Hayashi as Miyako
- Rumi Ejima as Harue
- Fujiko Naruse as Oshige
- Chieko Ishii as Shimewaka
- Ginko Ii as Okiyo
- Ryōko Satomi as Michiyo
- Reiko Sanjō as Otoyo
- Hisako Fujita as Hinako
- Kayoko Minakami as Kochō
- Teruko Hamada as Mitsuyū
- Mitsuko Sakai as Satogiku
- Shigeko Shijin as Ochobo
- Ryōko Hamaji as Abohan
- Setsuko Horikoshi as Kichiya
- Ayako Ichinose as Matsuba

== Production ==
Morimoto's play had originally been written for and performed by the Bungakuza theatre troupe. The film consists of an entirely female cast, showing no male characters at all; also, all scenes are filmed solely within the geisha house, and not one single shot in the film is repeated.

== Reception and legacy ==
In his 1979 book To the Distant Observer: Form and Meaning in the Japanese Cinema, film historian Nöel Burch rated Fallen Blossoms as "one of the most remarkable community portraits ever filmed", and Alexander Jacoby (in A Critical Handbook of Japanese Film Directors: From the Silent Era to the Present Day, 2008) titled the film the "acknowledged masterpiece" of its director. The British Film Institute included Fallen Blossoms in its 2020 The best Japanese film of every year – from 1925 to now list.

A print of the film is preserved at the National Film Archive of Japan.
