= The Abe Clan (1938 film) =

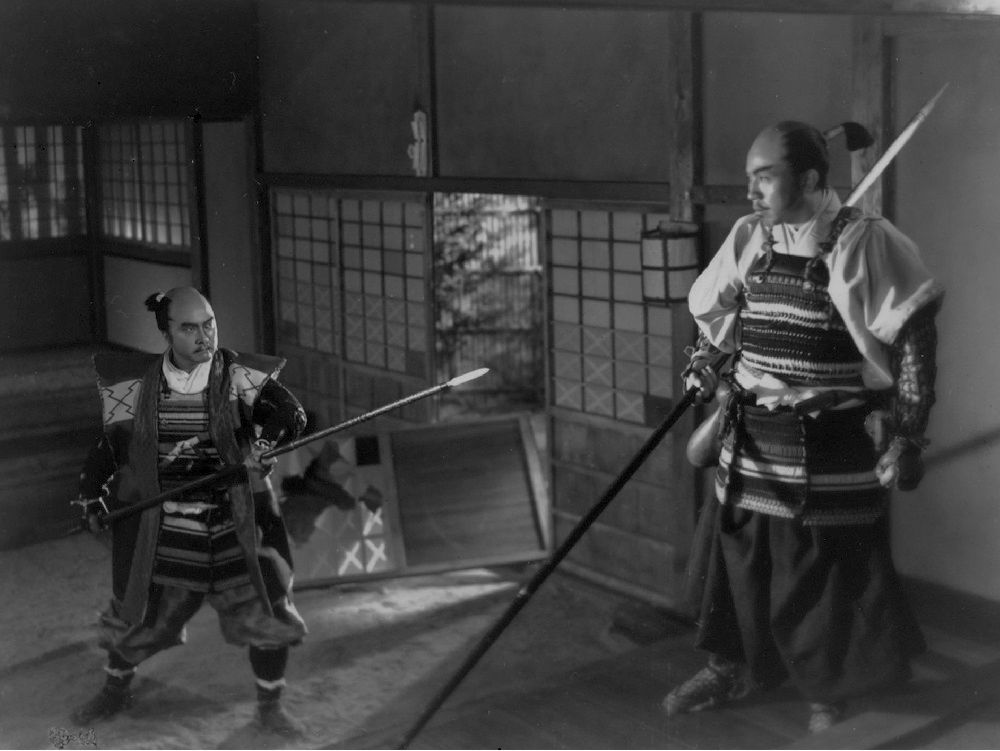
- Chōjūrō Kawarasaki and Kan'emon Nakamura
- Directed by: Hisatora Kumagai
- Written by: Masao Adachi
- Screenplay by: Hisatora Kumagai
- Based on: "Abe ichizoku" by Mori Ōgai
- Produced by: Masanobu Takeyama
- Starring: Chōjūrō Kawarasaki; Kan'emon Nakamura; Shizue Yamagishi
- Cinematography: Hiroshi Suzuki
- Edited by: Yoshitama Imaizumi
- Music by: Shirō Fukai
- Production companies: P.C.L. Toho Eiga
- Distributed by: Toho Eiga Distribution Corp.
- Release date: 1938
- Running time: 105 minutes
- Country: Japan
- Language: Japanese

The Abe Clan (阿部一族, Abe ichizoku) is a 1938 Japanese historical period film directed by Hisatora Kumagai and released by Toho. It is an adaptation of the 1913 Japanese short story "Abe ichizoku" by Mori Ōgai.

== Plot ==
Set during the Tokugawa period, Hosokawa Tadatoshi, feudal lord of the Higo Province, falls ill but forbids his vassals from committing seppuku after he dies. They all defy his request and after Abe Yaichi'emon, the last loyal holdout, also commits seppuku, Mitsunao, Tadatoshi's son and the new feudal lord, punishes the Abe clan for Yaichi'emon's disobedience.

== Cast ==
- Chōjūrō Kawarasaki as Matajuro Emoto
- Kan'emon Nakamura as Ygobei
- Shizue Yamagishi as Toshi
- Masako Tsutsumi as Osaki
- Emitaro Ichikawa as Yaichi'emon Abe
- Kunitarō Kawarazaki
- Kosaburō Tachibana as Gonbei
- Shinzaburo Ichikawa as Ichitayu
- Daisuke Katō
- Kosaburo Hashi
- Shimajiro Yamazaki as Gotayu
- Yuko Ichinose

== Production ==
The film is an adaptation of the 1913 short story "Abe ichizoku" by Mori Ōgai (translated into English under the titles The Abe Family as well as The Abe Clan), which was inspired by the junshi loyalty suicides committed by the Russo-Japanese War hero General Nogi Maresuke and his wife on the day of the funeral of Emperor Meiji. The same story was again adapted into a television film in 1995 directed by Kinji Fukasaku.
