= Tamizō Ishida =

Japanese film director

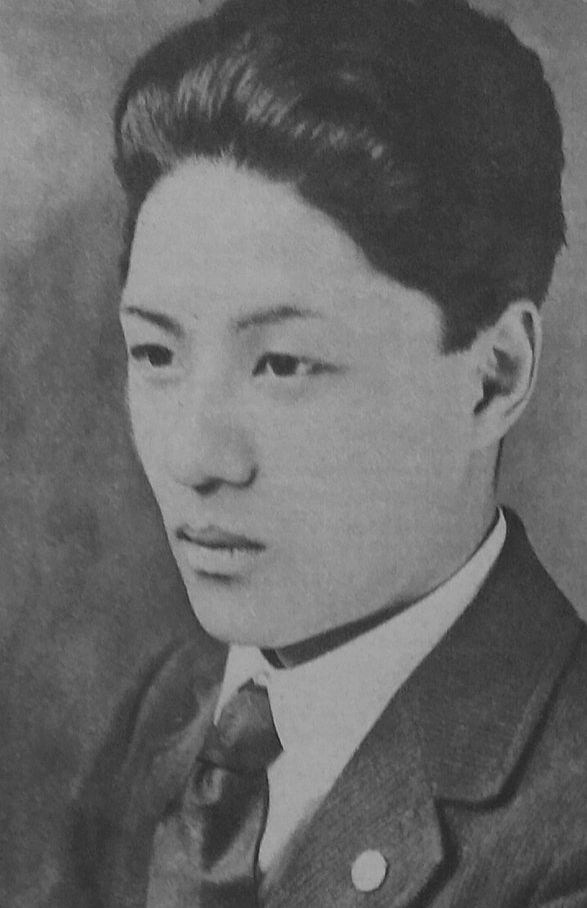
- Born: 7 June 1901; Masuda, Hiraka District, Akita Prefecture, Japan
- Died: 1 October 1972 (aged 71)
- Occupations: Film director, screenwriter
- Years active: 1926–1947

Tamizō Ishida (石田民三, Ishida Tamizō; 7 June 1901 – 1 October 1972) was a Japanese film director and screenwriter. He is most noted for his 1938 historical drama film Fallen Blossoms, which is now regarded as one of the outstanding works of 1930s Japanese cinema.

== Biography ==
Ishida was born in Masuda (now Yokote), Akita Prefecture, Japan. He made his directing debut at Toa Kinema in 1926, specialising in chanbara (sword fight) films, the majority of which are regarded as lost. In the mid-1930s, Ishida made a name for himself with literary adaptations, often in collaboration with the Bungakuza theatre troupe, and films with female casts. Nowadays, his films set in entertainment districts are regarded as his standout works, most notably the 1938 Fallen Blossoms, a formally innovative film about the inhabitants of a Kyoto geisha house in the late Edo period. Other notable films of the era include Yoru no hato (1937), Mukashi no uta and Hanatsumi nikki (both 1939), Keshōyuki (1940, based on a story by Mikio Naruse) and Asagiri gunka (1943). After the end of World War II, Ishida directed only one more film before his early retirement from the film business, instead running a teahouse with his wife in Kamishichiken, Kyoto.

== Selected filmography ==
- 1927: Keyamura Rokusuke (毛谷村六助)
- 1927: Date hiroku: Matsumae Tetsunosuke (伊達秘録 松前鉄之助) partially extant film
- 1934: Osen (おせん) partially extant film
- 1937: Hanabi no machi (花火の街)
- 1937: Yoru no hato (夜の鳩)
- 1938: Fallen Blossoms (Hana chirinu)
- 1939: Hana-tsumi nikki
- 1939: Mukashi no uta (むかしの歌)
- 1939: Hanatsumi nikki (花つみ日記)
- 1940: Keshōyuki (化粧雪)
- 1941: Orizo nan henge
- 1943: Asagiri gunka (あさぎり軍歌)
- 1947: En wa ina mono (縁は異なもの)

== Legacy ==
In 2022, the National Film Archive of Japan presented a small retrospective in commemoration of Ishida with seven of his films. Fallen Blossoms was screened at the Il Cinema Ritrovato Festival in 2017 and included in the British Film Institute's The best Japanese film of every year – from 1925 to now list.
