= Hisatora Kumagai =

Japanese film director (1904–1986)

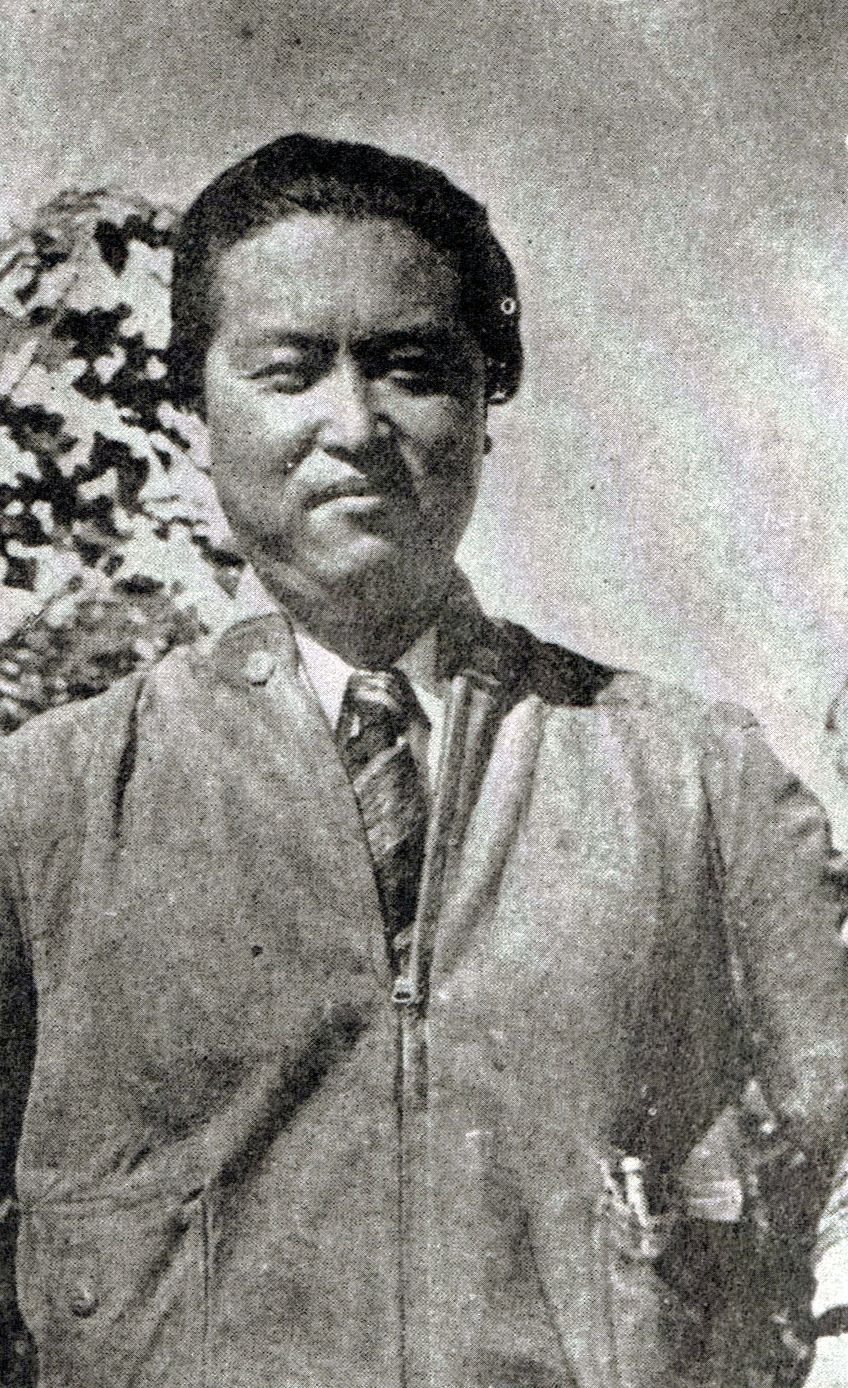
- Born: March 8, 1904; Nakatsu, Japan
- Died: May 22, 1986 (aged 82)
- Occupation(s): Film director, screenwriter

Hisatora Kumagai (熊谷 久虎, Kumagai Hisatora; March 8, 1904 – May 22, 1986) was a Japanese film director and screenwriter.

== Selected filmography ==
- 1932 Dōinrei, Mobilization Orders (lost)
- 1936 Takuboku, Poet of Passion
- 1936 Many People
- 1938 The Abe Clan
