= Tatsuo Nagai =

Japanese writer

- 永井 龍男
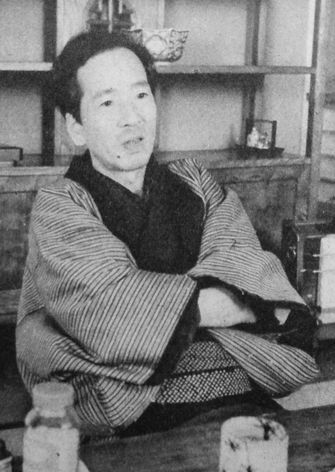
- Tatsuo Nagai in 1955
- Born: 20 May 1904; Tokyo, Japan
- Died: 12 October 1990 (aged 86); Kamakura, Kanagawa, Japan
- Resting place: Saikai-ji, Mita, Tokyo Japan
- Occupations: Writer, poet, journalist
- Writing career
- Genres: short stories, novels, essays haiku
- Notable awards: Noma Prize (1965); Yomiuri Prize (1969, 1973); Kikuchi Kan Prize (1972); Kawabata Yasunari Prize (1975)

Tatsuo Nagai (永井 龍男, Nagai Tatsuo; 20 May 1904 – 12 October 1990) was a writer of short stories, novels, and essays, active in the Shōwa period Japan, known for his portrayals of city life. Nagai was also known as a haiku poet under the pen-name of "Tomonkyo".

== Early life ==
Nagai was born in the Sarugakuchō neighborhood of Tokyo in impoverished circumstances. He was forced to quit school after graduation from elementary school due to his father's illness and premature death. However, he had already begun to exhibit signs of literary talent, and his first novel Kappan-ya no Hanashi ("Tale of a Printer's Shop") was published when he was 16. This novel won a prize in a competition and was highly praised by the well-known author and editor, Kikuchi Kan.

== Literary career ==
Due to this encouragement, Nagai devoted his energies to writing, submitting a stage play to the Imperial Garden Theater in 1923, and publishing Kuroi Gohan ("Black Rice") in Bungeishunjū, a monthly literary journal founded by Kikuchi Kan. In 1924, together with the famous literary critic Kobayashi Hideo and some others, he launched his own monthly literary magazine called Yamamayu.

In 1927, while continuing to write, Nagai was hired as an editor for Bungeishunjū. During this time, he helped to lay the foundations for the Akutagawa and Naoki Prizes, created in 1935, and later became a member of the screening committee.

In January 1934, through the introduction of the wife of author Kubota Mantarō, Nagai married the daughter of Kume Masao, by whom he had two daughters.

In April 1943, Nagai traveled to Xinjing, the capital of Manchukuo to establish an independent branch of the Bungeishunjū, returning to Tokyo in March 1945 to assume the post of executive director to the magazine.

However, due to his wartime activity as a correspondent, Nagai was purged from public service by the American occupation authorities after World War II. He then decided to concentrate on writing short stories as a profession. Asagiri ("Morning Mist", 1947) was well received by critics. He wrote a number of short novels, among them, Mikan,("Orange"), Ikko ("One"), and Aki ("Autumn"), which were collected in 1965 into an anthology titled Ikko sono ta ("One and Others"), which was awarded the Noma Prize and the Japan Art Academy Prize for that year.

Nagai became a member of the Japan Art Academy in 1968. In 1972 he was awarded the Kikuchi Kan Prize. His 1972 novel Kochabanba yuki (コチャバンバ行き) won the 24th Yomiuri Prize. In 1974, he was awarded the Order of the Sacred Treasure, (2nd class) by the Japanese government. The same year, he was awarded the Kawabata Yasunari Literary Award. In 1981, Nagai was awarded the Order of Culture by the Japanese government. The same year, Kodansha published his collected works in 12 volumes.

Nagai lived in Kamakura, Kanagawa Prefecture from 1934 until his death from a heart attack in 1990 at the age of 86. Nagai served as the first director of the Kamakura Museum of Literature from 1985 to 1990. His grave is at the temple of Saikai-ji in Mita, Tokyo.

== Works ==
- 朝霧 (asagiri) Morning Mist, representative of a genre of part fiction, part essay, was translated by Edward Seidensticker in ISBN 978-0804812269).

== See also ==
- Japanese literature
- List of Japanese authors
