= Sankichi Tōge =

Japanese poet

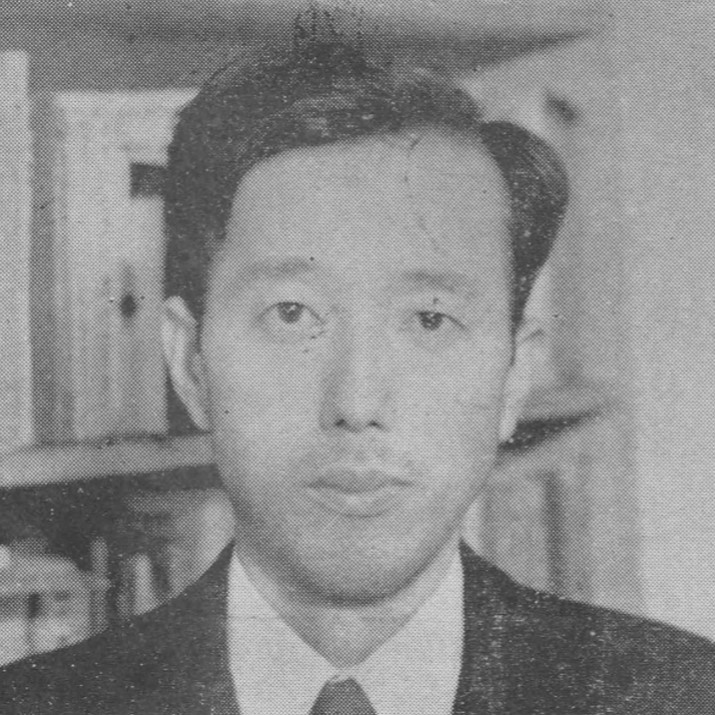
Image of Sankichi Toge

Sankichi Tōge (峠 三吉, Tōge Sankichi; 19 February 1917 – 10 March 1953), born Mitsuyoshi Tōge, was a Japanese poet, activist, and survivor of the atomic bombing of Hiroshima. He is best known for his collection of poems Genbaku Shishu ("Poems of the Atomic Bomb"), published in 1951.

== Early life and education ==
Mitsuyoshi Tōge, later known as Sankichi Tōge, was born on 19 February 1917 in Osaka, the youngest son of Ki'ichi Tōge, a successful manufacturer of bricks. From the start Tōge was a sickly child, suffering from asthma and periodic vomiting.

His family was politically radical, with two siblings official members of the Communist Party and all of the children having been arrested at least once; however, Tōge did not become involved in politics at this time.

He graduated from Hiroshima Prefecture's School of Commerce in 1935 and started working for the Hiroshima Gas Company.

== Poetry and activism ==
Tōge started composing poems in the second year of middle school. Early influences included Tolstoy, Heine, Tōson Shimazaki, and Haruo Sato. By 1945 he had composed three thousand tanka and even more haiku. They were mostly lyric poems.

Tōge was 28 in Midori-machi, 3 km (1.9 mi) from the hypocenter of the bomb dropped by the Americans on Hiroshima to end World War II in 1945. After this, his activism included the publication of several books advocating peace and opposing the use of nuclear weapons. Among other groups and movements, he became involved in and took up some leadership positions in the Hiroshima Poets Society (Hiroshima shijin kyōkai), the New Japan Literature Association (Shin Nihon bungaku kai), the Our Poetry Association (Warera no shi no kai), and the Communist-sponsored Culture Circle (Bunka sākuru) in Hiroshima. He also became involved in workers' rights and trade unions. Because of this activism, he gained a higher profile than two other prominent poets who also wrote about the bomb, Hara Tamiki and Ōta Yōko.

In 1946, he submitted an essay entitled "Hiroshima in 1965", containing ideas for the revival of the city, to a competition held by Chugoku Shimbun newspaper, winning first prize. The essay, which some later said had been written by his elder brother, was published in Chugoku Shimbun. In 1949 he joined the Japanese Communist Party.

By 1951 he was writing poetry very different from his earlier efforts, as he became more politicised. His first collection of the atomic bomb works, Genbaku Shishu ("Poems of the Atomic Bomb") was published in 1951. In the same year, it was sent to the World Youth Peace Festival in Berlin, where it garnered international acclaim.

His work includes references to the political environment of the time, especially of Japan occupied by the Allied Forces, and he expresses anger at the United States, while not mentioning the country by name.

== Personal life and death ==
In 1938 Tōge was diagnosed, wrongly, with tuberculosis. Believing himself to have only a few years to live, he spent most of his time as an invalid.

In December 1942, he was baptized into the Catholic Church, and did not denounce religion after joining the Communist Party.

In 1948 Tōge learned that his earlier diagnosis was wrong; he had bronchiectasis, an enlargement of the bronchial tube. During his illness and hospitalisation, his supporters raised funds to pay the fees for his medical expenses.

Tōge died on 10 March 1953 at the age of 36 at the National Hiroshima Sanatorium.

== Legacy ==
Tōge's poetry, especially that containing the vivid imagery describing the pain caused by the bomb, has been translated into many languages, and he is regarded as "the leading poet of atomic bomb".

A monument to Tōge was erected at on 6 August 1963, which bears his most well known poem, Genbaku Shishu.

In 2013 the Association of Preservation Data on Hiroshima Literature received around 20 previously unpublished manuscripts from the nephew of Tōge, which included the draft of a plan to reconstruct Hiroshima. As it had accompanied the prizewinning essay mentioned above, there was still some uncertainty regarding its authorship.

Midnight in Broad Daylight (2016), by American historian Pamela Rotner Sakamoto, takes its title from a poem by Tōge.

== Genbaku Shishu (Poems of the Atomic Bomb) ==
Japanese

（人間を返せ）

ちちをかえせ ははをかえせ
としよりをかえせ
こどもをかえせ
わたしをかえせ わたしにつながる
にんげんをかえせ
にんげんの にんげんのよのあるかぎり
くずれぬへいわを
へいわをかえせ

Transcription

(Ningen wo Kaese)

chichi o kaese haha o kaese
toshi yori o kaese
kodomo o kaese
watashi o kaese watashi ni tsunagaru
ningen o kaese
ningen no ningen no yo no aru kagiri
kuzurenu heiwa o
heiwa o kaese

English Translation

by John McLean in Hiroshima Piano (03:08-03:57)

Bring back my father!
Bring back my mother!
Bring back the elderly!
Bring back the young!
Bring back my life...
and the lives...
of those destined to me!
Bring back...
all that is human,
enduring peace.
Bring back peace!

English Translation

at Hiroshima Peace Memorial Park (Monument Dedicated to Sankichi Tōge)

Give back my father, give back my mother;
Give grandpa back, grandma back;
Give my sons and daughters back.
Give me back myself,
Give back the human race.
As long as this life lasts, this life,
Give back peace
That will never end.

== See also ==
- Atomic bomb literature
- Hiroshima rages, Nagasaki prays
