= Hideo Yoshino =

Japanese writer

- 吉野 秀雄
- Born: July 3, 1902; Takasaki, Gunma, Japan
- Died: July 13, 1967 (aged 65); Kamakura, Kanagawa Japan
- Resting place: Zuisen-ji, Kamakura, Japan
- Education: Keio University
- Occupation: Writer
- Writing career
- Language: Japanese
- Genres: poetry, essays
- Notable awards: Yomiuri Prize (1958); Chōkū Prize (1967); Ministry of Culture Prize (1968)

Hideo Yoshino (吉野 秀雄, Yoshino Hideo; July 3, 1902 - July 13, 1967) was a tanka poet in Shōwa period Japan.

== Early life ==
Yoshino was born in Takasaki city, Gumma prefecture, as the second son in a family of textile wholesalers. Of weak constitution, he was raised by his grandmother in Tomioka, Gunma. He enrolled in Keio University's School of Economics, but was forced to quit school when he developed tuberculosis with hemoptysis. He relocated from Tokyo to Kamakura in Kanagawa prefecture in 1924, due to its reputation as a healthful environment for people with lung conditions.

While recuperating, he became familiar with the verses of Masaoka Shiki and Itō Sachio, two poets in the Araragi tanka group, and he began to compose verses himself. He was also attracted to the works of Aizu Yaichi and eventually became his pupil. In 1926, he married Hatsu Kuribayashi. However, his health condition steadily worsened in 1926 and 1927, deteriorating from asthma and bronchitis to dyspnea, and with the development of painful anal fistula which required surgery.

== Literary career ==
In 1926 Yoshino financed the publication of his own first poetry anthology, Tenjō gishi. He also participated in the literary coterie centered on the literary journal Kawa ("River"), to which he contributed monthly from 1928. Yoshino developed pneumonia in 1929, and was for a time on the critical list and not expected to live. However, after the birth of his son that summer, he recovered. The following year, he travelled to Ibaraki Prefecture and Niigata Prefecture to attend ceremonies centered on the 19th century Buddhist priest-poet, Ryōkan, whose tight, succinct style he attempted to emulate. Yoshino returned to Kamakura in 1931, and devoted his studies to folklore, ancient literature and languages, self-publishing a monthly magazine, Yoshino Fuji Monthly, and holding monthly poetry meetings. He developed a unique style of tanka that was independent of the mainstream Araragi. He also was inspired by the ancient classic from Japanese literature, the Man'yōshū. However, most of his works did not appear in print until after the end of World War II.

Yoshino divorced during World War II, and remarried after the end of the war to the widow of poet Jūkichi Yagi. In the immediate post-war period, Yoshino was an instructor at the Kamakura Academy, and made a lecture tour together with Masao Kume and Masajirō Kojima to Niigata. He won the Yomiuri Literary Prize in 1958 for his anthology, Yoshino Hideo kashū.

In the 1960s, Yoshino was known for his studies on Ryōkan. His anthologies include Seiin shū ("The Clear and Cloudy Collection", 1967) and Kansen shū ("The Autumn Cicada Collection", 1974).Yoshino also wrote a number of essays, including Yawarakana Kokoro ("Soft heart") and Korokono Furusato ("Home is the heart").

Suffering from ill health all of his life, Yoshino added diabetes and rheumatism to his ailments before his death in 1967. His grave is at the temple of Zuisen-ji in Kamakura.

== See also ==
- Japanese literature
- List of Japanese authors
