= The House of Hands =

1960 Japanese short story

- Short story by Mitsuharu Inoue
- Original title: 手の家; Te no ie
- Translator: Frederick Uleman; Kōichi Nakagawa (1984/85)
- Country: Japan
- Language: Japanese
- Genre: Atomic bomb literature

Publication
- Published in: Bungakukai
- Publication type: Magazine
- Publisher: Bungeishunjū
- Media type: Print
- Publication date: 1960
- Published in English: 1984/85

The House of Hands (Japanese: 手の家, Hepburn: Te no ie) is a 1960 short story in the atomic bomb literature genre by Japanese writer Mitsuharu Inoue. It depicts the fate of a group of young women who survived the atomic bombing of Nagasaki and grew up as orphans on a small island inhabited by descendants of Crypto-Christians.

== Plot ==
A couple of years after the end of the Pacific War, two men arrive on a small island off Nagasaki coast. One of the men was sent to conduct real estate negotiations, the other, Hatsuma Wajima, is the uncle of local village teacher Teruhide, who came to see if Teruhide's fiancée Rie is an acceptable marriage prospect for the family. Unbeknownst to Hatsuma, Rie was one of four orphan girls, all survivors of the bombing of Nagasaki, who arrived shortly after the war in the "House of Hands", an orphanage operated by the Catholic church. (The name refers to the pottery work the orphans were given to do.) Two others of the group, Shigeno and Seiko, have been married to local men in the meantime, but are seemingly unable to receive healthy children: Shigeno lost both her children some time after birth, while Seiko has just lost her first expected child in a miscarriage. Teruhide instructs Rie not to tell his uncle about her true origins but instead to pretend that she is a local girl.

Seiko eventually dies of her miscarriage, while Teruhide's uncle finds out about Rie's provenance, which puts an end to the couple's marriage plans. During Seiko's funeral rites, a debate starts among the attendants about the rumoured re-opening of the orphanage. The elders among the villagers, all descendants of Crypto-Christians, object against the project, again to be operated by the orthodox Catholic church. Also, a re-opening would mean new orphans arriving, and new unfertile women, with the result that the village would become stigmatised like a community of untouchables.

== Publishing history and translations ==
The House of Hands was first published in June 1960 in the literary magazine Bungakukai. It appeared in book form the following year in the anthology Bungaku Senshu together with stories by Kenzaburō Ōe, Yōko Ōta, Yukio Mishima and others, and in a collection of Inoue's works in 1965. In 1983, it was included in the anthology Nani tomo shirenai mirai ni ("In the unknown future"), edited by Ōe, and in the 15 volume edition on Japanese atomic bomb literature, Nihon no genbaku bungaku.

The House of Hands has been translated into English, German, Czech and Serbian language.

== See also ==
- Hibakusha

== Bibliography ==
- Inoue, Mitsuharu (1984). "The House of Hands". In Ōe, Kenzaburō (ed.). Atomic Aftermath: Short Stories about Hiroshima and Nagasaki. Translated by Uleman, Frederick; Nakagawa, Kōichi. Tokyo: Shueisha Press.
- Inoue, Mitsuharu (1985). "The House of Hands". In Ōe, Kenzaburō (ed.). Fire from the Ashes: Short Stories about Hiroshima and Nagasaki. Translated by Uleman, Frederick; Nakagawa, Kōichi. London: Readers International.
- Inoue, Mitsuharu (1985). "The House of Hands". In Ōe, Kenzaburō (ed.). The Crazy Iris and Other Stories of the Atomic Aftermath. Translated by Uleman, Frederick; Nakagawa, Kōichi. New York: Grove Press.
