= Fumio Niwa =

Japanese writer (1904–2005)

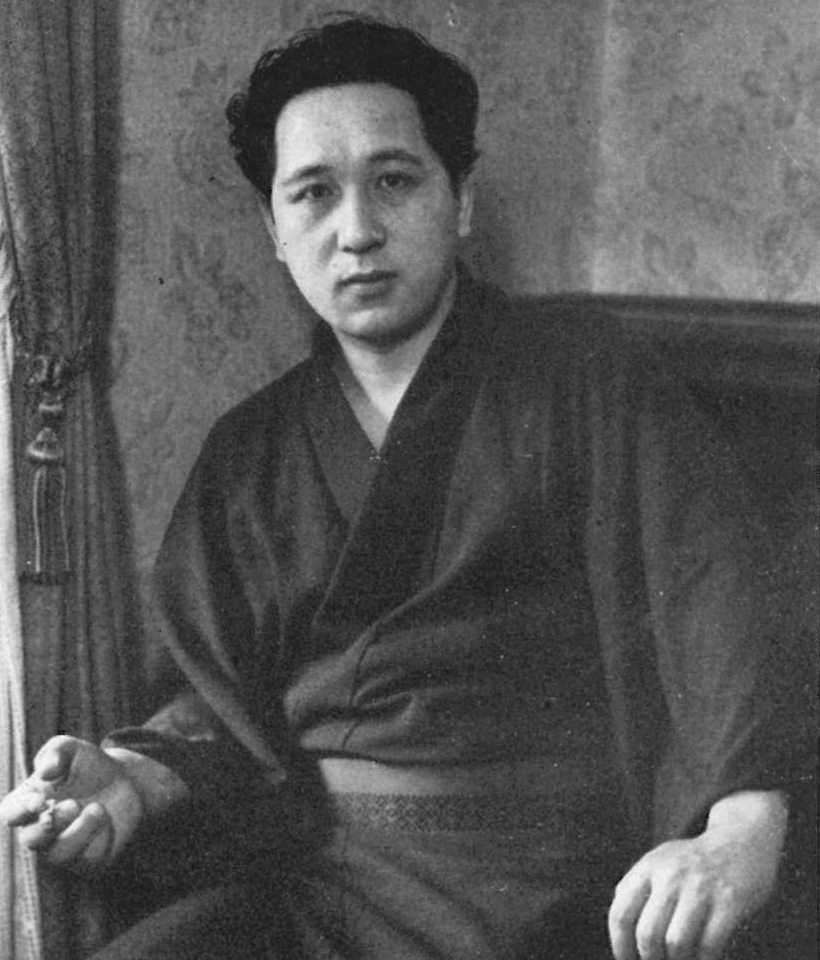
- Fumio Niwa in 1951
- Born: 22 November 1904; Yokkaichi
- Died: 20 April 2005 (aged 100)
- Education: Waseda University
- Writing career
- Genre: History

Fumio Niwa (丹羽 文雄, Niwa Fumio; November 22, 1904 Japan, died April 20, 2005 in Musashino, Tokyo) was a Japanese novelist with a long list of works, the most famous in the West being his novel The Buddha Tree (Japanese Bodaiju, "The Linden", or "The Bodhi Tree", 1956).

He was ordained as a Shin Buddhist priest in his youth, but abandoned the priesthood two years after his ordination.

== Career ==
Niwa was born in Mie Prefecture, the eldest son of a priest in the Pure Land sect of Buddhism. He grew up at Sōgen-ji, a temple in Yokkaichi near Nagoya. After his graduation from Waseda University, he reluctantly entered the hereditary priesthood there but quit two years later, at the age of 29, in order to become a writer, walking out of the temple grounds on 10 April 1932 and heading back to Tokyo. He was supported by his girlfriend until their marriage in 1935. During this time he published Sweetfish (Japanese Ayu), serialised in Bungeishunjū, and the novel Superfluous Flesh (Japanese Zeiniku).

Niwa's work was controversial and, during World War II, two of his novels were banned for immorality. In 1938, Niwa joined the Pen butai (lit. "Pen corps"), a government organisation which consisted of authors who travelled the front during the Second Sino-Japanese War to write favourably of Japan's war efforts in China. He worked as a war correspondent in China and New Guinea, accompanied Rear Admiral Gunichi Mikawa's Eighth Fleet and was on board the flagship Chōkai during the Battle of Savo Island on 9 August 1942. He was wounded at Tulagi. These experiences inspired Naval Engagement (Japanese Kaisen) and Lost Company (Kaeranu Chutai), both censored.

After the war Niwa became an extremely prolific author of more than 80 novels, 100 volumes of short stories, and 10 volumes of essays. His most celebrated short story was The Hateful Age (Japanese Iyagarase no Nenrei, 1947, literally "The Age of Disgust"), about a family terrorised by a senile grandmother, which enjoyed such popularity that the title became a phrase in the language, for a time.

The novel The Buddha Tree uses his unhappy childhood at Sōgen-ji as a backdrop. When he was eight years old his mother eloped with an actor from a Kansai Kabuki company; an event that greatly traumatised him. In this novel the story is elaborated fictionally.

Later works include, from 1969, a five-volume biography of Shinran (1173–1262), the founder of the Pure Land sect, and in 1983 an eight-volume work on Rennyo, a 15th-century monk who died on a pilgrimage to India.

In 1965 Niwa was elected a member of the Japan Art Academy, and the following year he was elected as Chairman of the Japanese Writers' Association, a position he held for many years. Niwa encouraged fellow members to play golf, organised health insurance, and bought land for a writers' cemetery. He won the 19th Yomiuri Prize and was awarded the Order of Culture in 1977.

He was diagnosed with Alzheimer's disease in 1986. He was married twice and had one son and one daughter, Keiko Honda, who described his decline in Days of Care (Japanese Kaigo no hibi, 1997). He died of pneumonia in 2005.
