= Pen Butai =

Japanese government organisation 1938–1942

The Pen Butai (ペン部隊, lit. "Pen Corps" or "Pen Brigade") was a Japanese government organisation which existed between 1938 and 1942. It was composed of Japanese authors who travelled the front during the Second Sino-Japanese War to write favourably of Japan's war efforts in China.

== History ==
The Pen Butai was formed in 1938 after a meeting between the Cabinet Intelligence Department and writers Kan Kikuchi, Masao Kume, Eiji Yoshikawa, Riichi Yokomitsu, Haruo Satō, Nobuko Yoshiya and Fumio Niwa. The aim was to have popular authors travel the Sino-Japanese front and write favourably of their experiences in form of stories, novels, plays, poems and personal journals for propagandistic purposes. Those who participated were offered free travel, accommodation and food, access to off-limits war areas and the possibility to interview important military figures. The invitation sent out by the government met with such an enthusiastic response that not all writers who wished to join could be accommodated. 22 men and two women were flown overseas in September 1938; a smaller group followed two months later. These included Kikuchi, Kume, Yoshikawa, Yoshiya, Fumiko Hayashi, Matsutarō Kawaguchi, Kunio Kishida, Masajirō Kojima and Tadao Kumei.

The subsequently published works by the writers involved were supportive of the war as had been expected, and only very few exceptions dared to present its brutal reality. Tatsuzō Ishikawa's (Note: Ishikawa travelled the Sino-Japanese front for the magazine Chūō Kōron, not as a member of the Pen Butai.) Ikite iru heitai ("Soldiers alive"), which depicted the war in a realistic manner, was censored.

In 1942, the Pen Butai was assimilated by the Nihon bungaku hōkokukai ("Patriotic Association for Japanese Literature"), led by Sohō Tokutomi and Kume, and a subordinate of the Cabinet Intelligence Bureau.

== See also ==
- Senbu
