= Mantarō Kubota =

Japanese author, playwright, and poet

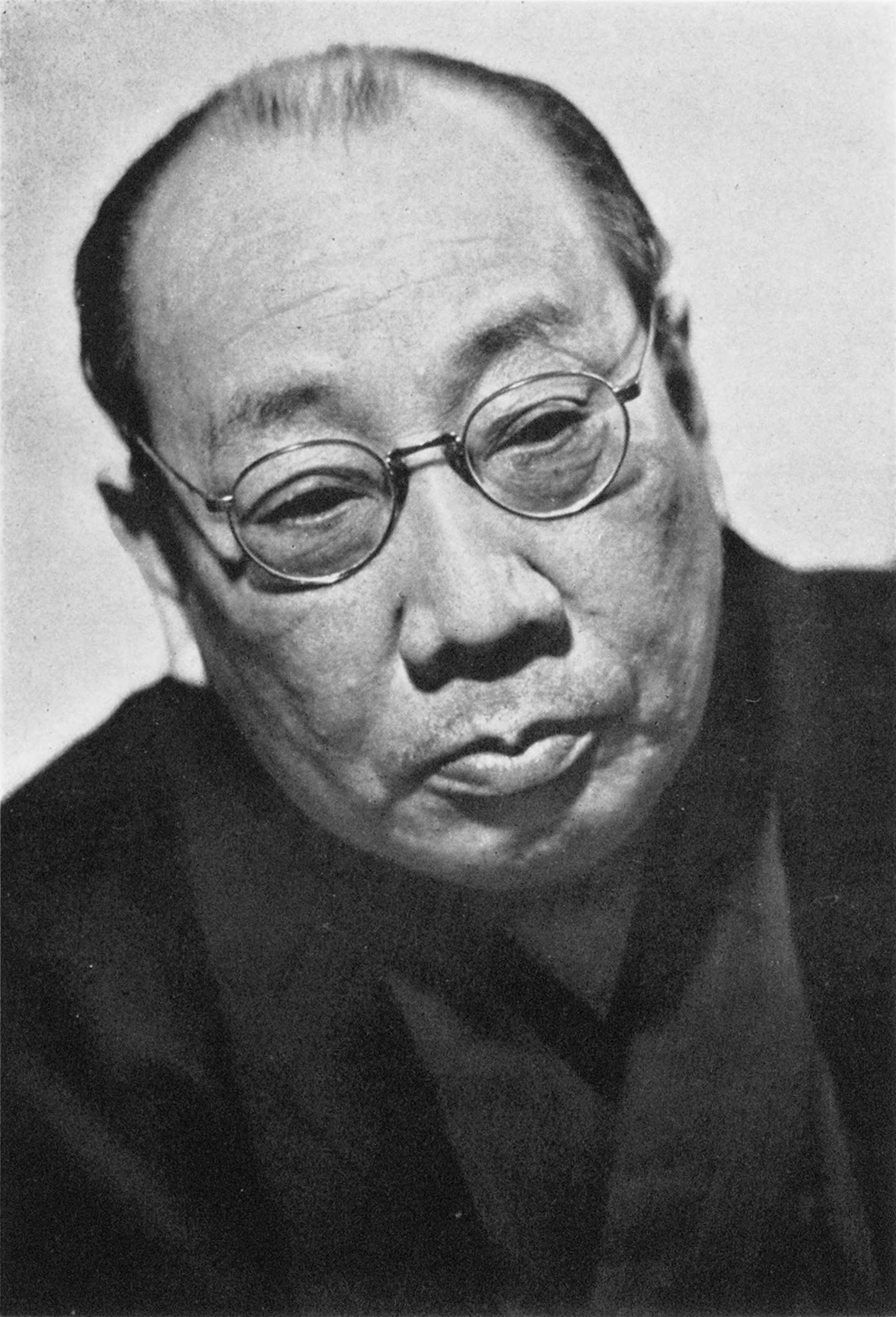
- Kubota Mantarō
- Born: 11 November 1889; Tokyo, Japan
- Died: 6 May 1963 (aged 73); Tokyo, Japan
- Occupations: Writer, playwright and poet
- Writing career
- Genres: novels, stage plays, haiku

Mantarō Kubota (久保田 万太郎, Kubota Mantarō; 11 November 1889 – 6 May 1963) was a Japanese author, playwright, and poet.

== Early life ==
Kubota was born in the Asakusa district of Tokyo, to a clothing merchant family. He became interested in stage plays at an early age, largely due to the influence of his grandmother, who also provided financial support for him to attend college. While attending college preparatory courses, he attended lectures by Mori Ōgai and Nagai Kafū. While still a student at Keio University in 1911, he made his literary debut with the short novel Asagao ("Morning Glory", 朝顔) and a stage play Yugi ("Game", 遊戯), both of which appeared in the university's journal Mita Bungaku, and which led to a long-lasting friendship and association with Takitarō Minakami. In October 1912, he joined the literary coterie of Hototogisu and was introduced to Izumi Kyōka.

== Pre-war career ==
Starting from 1919, Kubota taught courses in literature at Keio University, writing stage plays in the Shinpa genre and novels which were serialized in the Tokyo Nichi Nichi Shimbun or the Osaka Asahi Shimbun.

Kubota went on to write many full-length novels, including Tsuyushiba ("Dew on the Grass"), and Shundei ("Spring Thaw"), which depicted the joys and sorrows and traditional lifestyle of ordinary people in working-class neighborhoods in old pre-war Tokyo.

In the Great Kantō earthquake of 1923, his home in the Nippori neighborhood of Tokyo burned down, and he relocated to nearby Tabuchi, where he made the acquaintance of Ryūnosuke Akutagawa.

In 1926, along with the novelist Masao Kume, he joined the Tokyo Central Broadcasting Station (now NHK), and later headed the drama and music department. He greatly contributed to the development of radio broadcast drama in its early stages. In 1929 he adapted Jusanya (13th Night) by Ichiyō Higuchi as a radio drama. In 1931 he became the manager of the literary section of Tokyo Central Broadcasting, remaining in that post until 1938. Kubota's wife committed suicide in 1935 by an overdose of sleeping pills. In 1936, he accepted an assignment from the Tokyo Nichi Nichi Shimbun, sponsored by the Japanese Government Railways to tour the national parks of Japan

In 1937, together with Kunio Kishida and Toyoo Iwata, Kubota created the Bungakuza theater company, promoting shingeki drama, and became a leading figure in the modern theater circles in Japan.

In the field of haiku poetry, Kubota came to edit the haiku magazine, Shunto. Although haiku remained merely a hobby, as he was more interested in novels and plays, Kubota published several haiku collections.

Kubota was awarded the Kikuchi Kan Prize in 1942. The same year, he went to Manchukuo at the request of the Information Bureau.

== Post-war career ==
Kubota lived in Kamakura, Kanagawa Prefecture from 1945 to 1955. He first moved there when an air raid in 1945 destroyed his Tokyo home. During those ten years, he made the acquaintance with many of the Kamakura literati as chairman of the Kamakura P.E.N. Club.

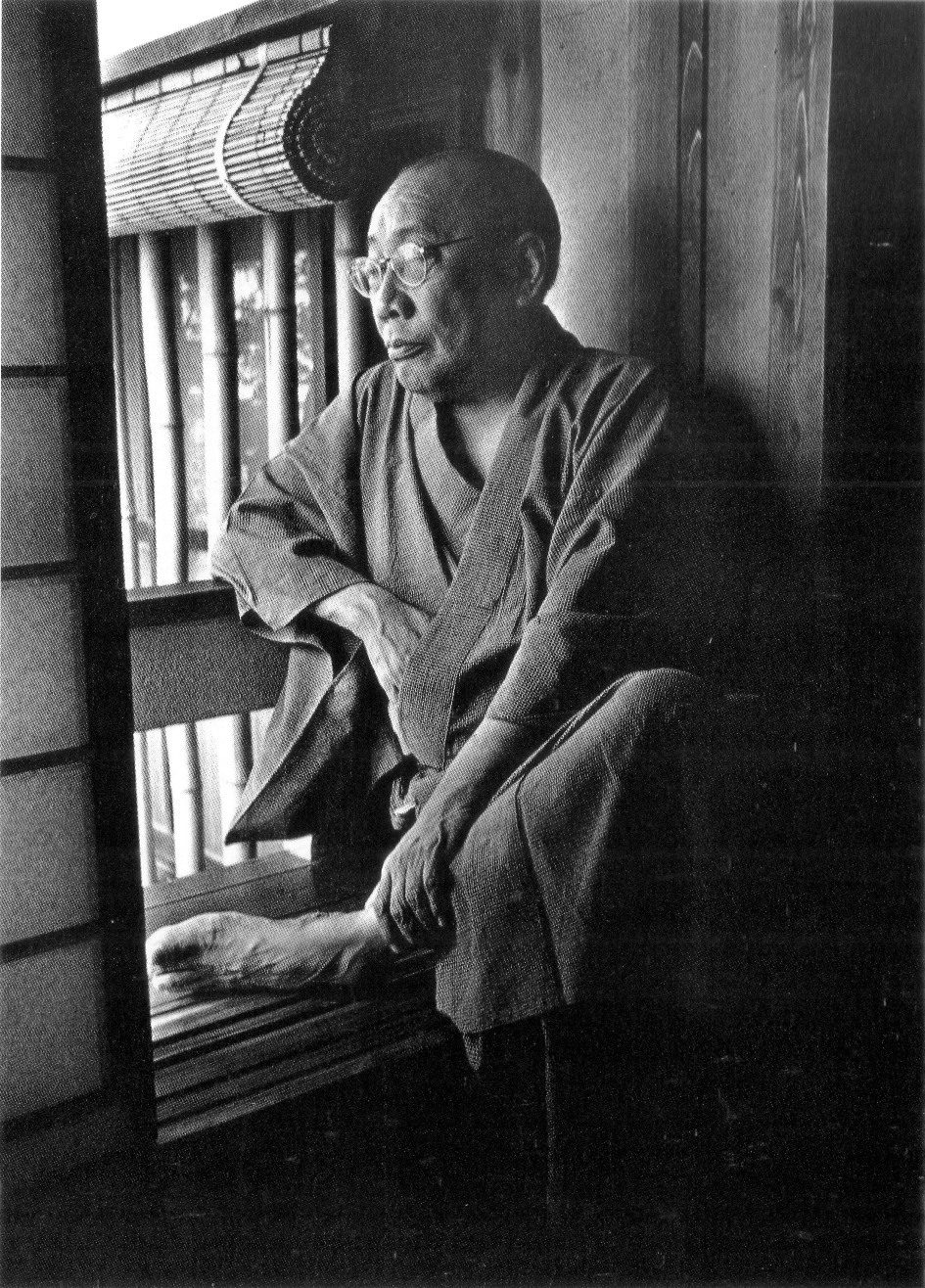
Kubota Mantarō in 1951, photo by Ken Domon

Kubota was appointed a member of the Imperial Academy in 1947. He was subsequently a professor at Kokugakuin University. In 1951, he received the NHK Broadcasting Culture Award and became chairman of the Japan Theatre Arts Association the same year. The following year, he became chairman of the Japan Writers' Association and was made a member of UNESCO in Japan. In 1954, he accepted the post of professor at Kyoritsu Women's University. In 1956, Kubota received the Yomiuri Prize for his work San no Tori. In 1957, Kubota was awarded the Order of Culture and was also appointed a Person of Cultural Merit.

Kubota died on 6 May 1963 at the age of 73, of food poisoning, after eating an akagai clam at a party held by Ryuzaburo Umehara. He was awarded the Grand Cordon of the Order of the Sacred Treasures posthumously. His funeral was held at the Tsukiji Hongan-ji, and his grave is located at the temple of Kifuku-ji in the Hongō neighborhood of Tokyo, behind the library of Keio University.

== See also ==
- Japanese literature
- List of Japanese writers
