= Summer Flower =

1947 short story by Tamiki Hara

- Short story by Tamiki Hara
- Original title: 夏の花; Natsu no hana
- Translator: George Saito (1953); Richard H. Minear (1990)
- Language: Japanese

Publication
- Published in: Mita Bungaku
- Publication type: Magazine
- Publisher: Nogaku Shorin
- Publication date: 1947, 1949
- Publication place: Japan
- Published in English: 1953, 1990
- Media type: Print

Summer Flower (Japanese: 夏の花, Hepburn: Natsu no hana), also translated as Summer Flowers, is a short story by Japanese writer Tamiki Hara first published in 1947. It depicts the bombing of Hiroshima and its immediate aftermath, which Hara had experienced in person. It is regarded as one of the most influential exponents of the Atomic bomb literature genre.

== Plot ==
On August 6, 1945, the first person narrator witnesses the bombing of Hiroshima from his parents' house, to which he has returned after visiting his wife's gravesite in Tokyo. Only slightly hurt like his sister, he flees from the spreading fires to the river, confronted with a growing number of casualties and horribly wounded survivors. He meets his two brothers, who are looking for their families, and hears various witnesses' accounts of the moment of the explosion. The narrator and his relatives manage to escape on a horse cart, except for one of his older brother's sons, whose corpse the family discovers on its way out of the city. The story closes with the account of a man called N., who searches the destroyed city for three days and nights, looking for his missing wife, but to no avail.

== Background ==
Hara's autobiographical story emerged from a memoir which he had begun in 1945. Like the nameless narrator, Hara had lost his wife the previous year and was residing at his parents' house in Hiroshima when the atomic bomb was dropped.

== Publishing history and legacy ==
Summer Flower was first published in June 1947 in the literary magazine Mita Bungaku and in book form in 1949 by Nogaku Shorin. It received the first Takitaro Minakami Award in 1948. Hara followed Summer Flower with two subsequent sections, From the Ruins (Haikyou kara) in November 1947, and Prelude to Annihilation (Kaimetsu no joukyoku) in January 1949. Hara's original memoir, on which the story was based, was published posthumously under the title Genbaku hisai-ji no nōto (lit. "Notes on the atomic bomb disaster victims") in 1953.

== Translations ==
Hara's story has been translated into numerous languages. English translations were provided by George Saito in 1953 (abridged, expanded in 1985) and by Richard H. Minear in 1990.

== Bibliography ==
- Hara, Tamiki (Spring 1953). "Summer Flower". Pacific Spectator. 7 (2). Translated by Saito, George. Stanford: Stanford University Press: 25–34.
- Hara, Tamiki (1966). "Summer Flower". In Saeki, Shoichi (ed.). The Shadow of Sunrise: Selected Stories of Japan and the War. Translated by Saito, George. Tokyo: Kodansha International.
- Hara, Tamiki (1981). "Summer Flower". In Saeki, Shoichi (ed.). The Catch and Other War Stories. Translated by Saito, George. Tokyo: Kodansha International.
- Hara, Tamiki (1985). "Summer Flower, The Land of Heart's Desire". In Ōe, Kenzaburō (ed.). The Crazy Iris and Other Stories of the Atomic Aftermath. Translated by Saito, George. New York: Grove Press.
- Hara, Tamiki (1990). "Summer Flowers (Summer Flowers, From the Ruins, Prelude to Annihilation)". In Minear, Richard H. (ed.). Hiroshima: Three Witnesses. Princeton: Princeton University Press.
