= Yoko Ota =

Yoko Ota may refer to:

- Yōko Ōta, a Japanese female writer
- Yoko Hunnicutt, née Ota, a Japanese female athlete
