= Shashin Shūhō =

Propaganda magazine in Japan (1938–1945)

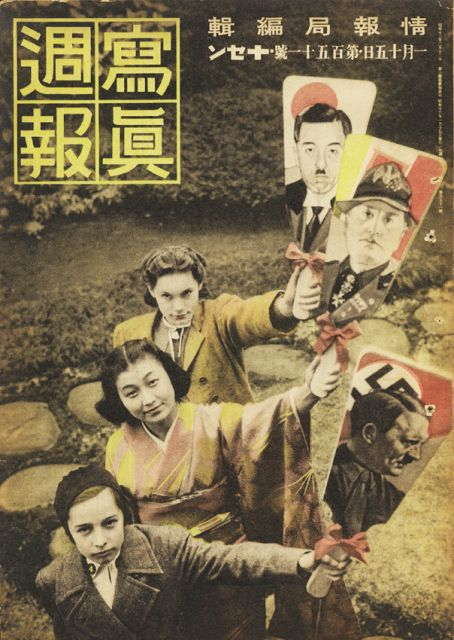
- Shashin Shūhō Issue 151 (15 January 1941)
- Categories: Propaganda magazine
- Frequency: Weekly
- Publisher: Cabinet Intelligence Department
- Founder: Cabinet Intelligence Department
- Founded: 1938
- First issue: 16 February 1938
- Final issue Number: 11 July 1945; 374–375
- Country: Japan
- Based in: Tokyo
- Language: Japanese

Shashin Shūhō (Japanese: 写真週報, lit. 'Weekly Photographical Journal') was an illustrated propaganda magazine of the Cabinet Intelligence Department which was published in Japan between 1938 and 1945. It was one of the most successful propaganda publications of Japan.

== History and profile ==
Shashin Shūhō was launched by the Cabinet Intelligence Department in 1938, and its first issue appeared on 16 February 1938. It was employed by the Japanese government for propaganda purposes and featured the news about the Japan's war activities in World War II. Its contents were accompanied by photographs which were mostly taken by the Nippon Kōbō collaborators, including Ken Domon and Ihei Kimura. The magazine came out weekly which reached the peak circulation level distributing 500,000 copies in 1943. It folded after the publication of the issue 374–375 on 11 July 1945.

The magazine issues have been archived by different institutions, including National Archives of Singapore and the British Museum.
