= The Land of Heart's Desire (short story) =

Short story by author Tamiki Hara

- Short story by Tamiki Hara
- Original title: Shingan no kuni
- Translator: John Bester
- Country: Japan
- Language: Japanese
- Genre(s): Atomic bomb literature

Publication
- Media type: Print
- Publication date: 1951
- Published in English: 1985

The Land of Heart's Desire (心願の国, Shingan no kuni) is a Japanese short story by author Tamiki Hara first published in 1951, and an example of Atomic bomb literature.

== Plot summary ==
The story consists of three parts: the first and longest part, "(1951) Musashino City", takes the form of a diary entry; this is followed by "A Letter to Kiichi Sasaki", a letter to a friend; and finally a poem entitled "For U....A Dirge".

(1951) Musashino City

The unnamed narrator lies in bed and upon hearing the singing of birds outside his window, and contemplates the notion of being reborn in the next life as a bird. The narrator reflects on whether his human consciousness would be transferred to his new bird body or if he would gain an entirely new animal consciousness upon rebirth.

Vowing to himself to live in bird-like innocence until death, the narrator then moves from the subject of birds to the subject of his own solitude since moving to his new lodgings. He talks of the solitude as being increasingly insupportable and the strong emotions he experiences from contact with nature and the outside world, notably upon looking at trees and stars. His thoughts then turn to memories of his wife and mother, who come to him in dreams, seemingly resurrected from the dead. The narrative then shifts to describe the narrator’s trauma from his experience of surviving the 1945 bombing of Hiroshima, for example the way he wakes up in shock in the middle of night thinking there has been another bombing. He states that in his personal case, the shock of the bombing has affected him increasingly with the ongoing passage of time. He proceeds to lament the burden of existing in a world where nuclear weapons exist and states a desire for a peaceful world that is free from conflict.

There is then a shift in space and time; the narrator is at a level-crossing and talks about how he often has to wait at this place for trains to pass. He thinks about the men broken by life, whose shades loiter near the rails, and contemplates if not his own shade is one of them. He then observes a dead leaf detach itself from a branch and fall to the ground, before pondering how long it has been since his first thoughts of suicide.

Another unspecified time shift occurs, and the narrator makes observations on the cold weather, and then articulates fantasies of death by freezing. This is followed by a childhood recollection of killing ants, and then a short passage where he notes that the only thing remaining in life capable of making him smile is a girl he calls "U". He mentions having repeatedly prayed for her happiness.

In the final passage of the section, the narrator comments on the arrival of Spring, which conjures mental images of his dead relatives in holiday dress and his wife on her deathbed. The final image of the section is of a lark soaring into the sky, bursting into flames and transforming into a shooting star, an image dreamed by the narrator. He sees in this image the "shape of [his] heart’s desire".

A Letter to Kiichi Sasaki

The unnamed narrator thanks his friend Sasaki for his years of kindness and expresses his wish to end his life, before recalling a brief memory of a recent social gathering at a quayside as a mutual friend departed on a journey to France. The letter ends with the narrator telling Sasaki to take care of himself.

For U....A Dirge

In a poem addressed to U, identified earlier in the work as the young girl he had met the previous year, the narrator touches on natural imagery before expressing his desire to die "without fuss" and ending by noting his belief that the present moment is the right time to end his life.

== Publication history ==
The Land of Heart's Desire was first published posthumously in 1951. Earlier in March, Hara had committed suicide at the very crossing which he had described in his story. It was later published by Shinchōsha in 1973 together with Hara's story Summer Flower in a volume entitled Natsu no hana・Shingan no kuni.

An English-language translation by John Bester was included in The Crazy Iris and Other Stories of the Atomic Aftermath (1985), an anthology of stories edited and with an introduction by future Nobel Prize winner Kenzaburō Ōe.

== Reception ==
John Whittier Treat regards The Land of Heart's Desire as an example of Atomic bomb literature which, along with other works by Hara such as Summer Flower, denotes the difficulties that come with having lived through the Hiroshima bombing and the burden of atomic consciousness. Academic Brett De Bary notes that Hara succeeds in making connections between insanity, memory and loneliness.
