= Takitarō Minakami =

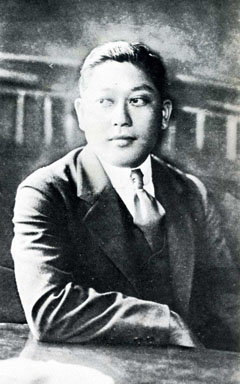
- Minakami Takitarō
- Born: 6 December 1887; Tokyo Japan
- Died: 23 March 1940 (aged 52); Tokyo Japan
- Occupation: Writer
- Writing career
- Genres: novels, poetry, essays

Takitarō Minakami (水上 滝太郎, Minakami Takitarō; 6 December 1887 – 23 March 1940) was the pen-name of Abe Shōzō, a Japanese novelist and literary critic active during the Shōwa period of Japan.

== Early life ==
Minakami was born in the upscale Azabu district of Tokyo. His father, Abe Taizo, was the founder of Meiji Life Insurance Company. In 1891 the family moved to Matsuzaka-cho in Shiba Ward of Tokyo. Minakami attended Keiō High School and played on the school's baseball club. While attending Keio University, he was inspired by the works of Kyōka Izumi and by a newly appointed professor, Kafū Nagai, who was also the founder of the literary magazine Mita Bungaku, launched in 1910. While at Keiō University, Minakami developed a friendship with the playwright, script writer, and director of the Bungakuza Theater, Mantarō Kubota.

== Literary career ==
While still a student at Keio University he began his literary career by contributing poems and short stories to Mita Bungaku and to the mainstream literary magazine Subaru. He established his own literary circle, Rei-no-kai, by gathering his aspiring writer friends at his home. His debut story, Yamanote no Ko ("Child from Yamanote") was the story of these gatherings, and was published in 1911 in Mita Bungaku. His choice of a pen-name came from a character in one of Izumi Kyoka's stories.

After a period overseas, studying economics in the United States, and touring 16 countries around the world, Minakami returned to Japan in 1916 to accept a position in his father's insurance company. However, he did not give up his literary aspirations, and this job provided him with an insight into the lives of white-collar workers, albeit from the rather lofty position of director of one of Japan's largest insurance companies.

Minakami wrote numerous novels in the 1920s and 1930s depicting the lives of common, urban people. His works include a novel Osaka no yado ("An Inn in Osaka", 1925–1926) and Kaigara Tsuihō (1918–1940), a collection of essays.

After Keio University dropped its financial support for Mita Bungaku literary magazine in 1925, he (along with Kubota Mantaro) contributed greatly to its re-launch and supported it throughout the 1930s.

Minakami continued to enjoy baseball even after he became a writer by arranging games between the Mita Bungaku amateur baseball team and a team led by rival author Ton Satomi.

Minakami died of a brain hemorrhage in 1940. His grave is at the Tama Reien, in Fuchū, Tokyo.

== See also ==
- Japanese literature
- List of Japanese authors
