= Tōjūrō no Koi =

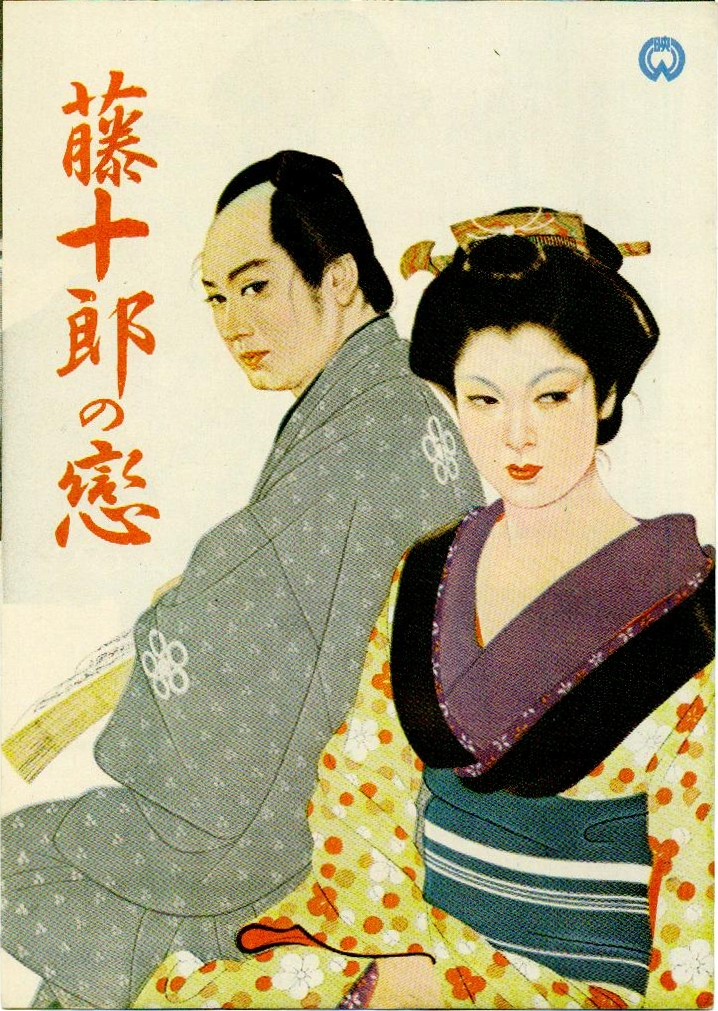
- Japanese movie poster
- Directed by: Kazuo Mori
- Written by: Kan Kikuchi (novel); Yoshikata Yoda (writer)
- Production company: Daiei Film
- Release date: June 15, 1955 (Japan)
- Running time: 86 minutes
- Country: Japan
- Language: Japanese

Tōjūrō no Koi (Japanese: 藤十郎の恋) is a 1955 black and white Japanese film directed by Kazuo Mori. It is based on the novel Tōjūrō no Koi (藤十郎の恋) written by Kan Kikuchi.

== Cast ==
Actor	Role
Kazuo Hasegawa	Tojuro Sakata
Machiko Kyō	Okaji
Eitarō Shindō	Mandayu Miyako
Eitaro Ozawa	Monzaemon Chikamatsu
Daisuke Katō	Kichisuke
Toranosuke Ogawa	Yoshizaemon Kaneko
Tokiko Mita	Osono
Shunji Natsume	Manjiro
Eijirō Yanagi	Kiyobei

== Note ==
The book had been previously adapted into another movie called Tōjūrō no Koi in 1938.
