= Shinoe Shōda =

Japanese poet and author

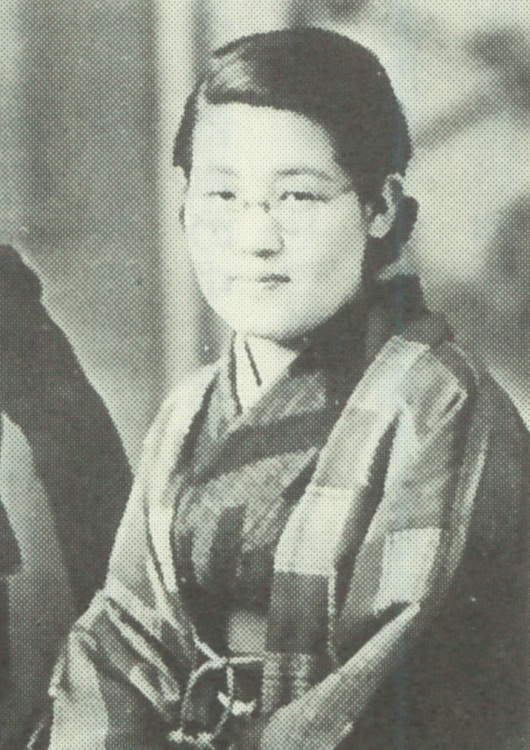
Shinoe Shōda

Shinoe Shōda (正田 篠枝, Shōda Shinoe; December 1910 – 15 June 1965) was a Japanese poet and author known for her atomic bomb literature.

== Biography ==
Shōda was born in Etajima in Hiroshima Prefecture in 1910. Around 1920 her family moved to Ujina, just outside Hiroshima, and in 1925 she enrolled in a Jōdo Shinshū girls' high school, graduating in 1929.

In the late 1920s, she started publishing poetry in Kōran, a monthly literary magazine.

Shōda married engineer Takamoto Suematsu and the two had a son, Shin'ichirō. In 1940 her husband died and in 1945 her family home was destroyed, forcing the family to move into the city of Hiroshima. On August 6, 1945, the city was devastated by the atomic bomb attack. Shōda's home at that time was only two kilometers from ground zero. By February of the next year, her father had died of intestinal cancer and later her son also fell ill.

Following Japan's surrender, Shōda started writing traditional tanka poetry on the theme of the atomic bombing. She had difficulty publishing both because of the subject and because of her relative lack of experience. In 1946 she succeeded in publishing 39 of her poems in the journal Fuschichō. In 1947, evading Occupation censorship, she secretly published Sange ("Penitence" or "Repentance"), a tanka anthology. 150 copies of the book were mimeographed by a clerk at the Hiroshima prison and Shōda personally distributed it to victims of the blast.

She published little after Sange until the 1960s when, in 1962 she published a memoir, A Ringing in the Ears. Shortly after its publication, she fell ill with breast cancer and her health deteriorated rapidly. She died on 15 June 1965, the year before the publication of her second tanka collection, Sarusuberi ("Crape myrtle"), published in 1966. "Reiko" along with "Chanchanko Bachan" ("Old Woman in Chanchanko (a padded sleeveless jacket)”), was posthumously published in Dokyumento Nihonjin ("Document of the Japanese") in 1969. Pikakko-chan contains seven stories, including “Reiko” and "Chanchako Bachan".

One of her poems from Sange appears on the Monument of the A-bombed Teachers and Students of National Elementary Schools in Hiroshima.
