= Han Ningen =

1954 Japanese novel

- Author: Yōko Ōta
- Original title: 半人間
- Language: Japanese
- Genre: Atomic bomb literature
- Publisher: Kodansha
- Publication date: 1954
- Publication place: Japan
- Media type: Print

Han Ningen (Japanese: 半人間; lit. "Half human") is a 1954 autobiographical novel in the Atomic bomb literature genre by Japanese writer Yōko Ōta. It follows a writer who, suffering from anxiety states due to her experiences as a survivor of the atomic bombing of Hiroshima and the possibility of a future nuclear war, undergoes mental treatment.

== Plot ==
At the height of the Korean War, writer Atsuko Oda, a survivor of the bombing of Hiroshima, suffers from anxiety states, fueled by her memories and the possible threat of a nuclear war. Her condition also manifests itself in insomnia, against which she injects herself repeated doses of antihistamines. Hospital physician Dr. Fukuda advises her to undergo a deep sleep therapy, so Atsuko moves into the hospital's mental ward. She reminisces about her Hiroshima experiences, her campaigning against nuclear weapons, and her housemaid Takeno's offer to commit suicide together, which Atsuko rejects, as she does the option to leave her home country.

Atsuko enters a sixteen-day-long deep sleep period; upon awakening, she suffers from hallucinations while at the same time witnessing the sometimes inattentive or even abusive treatment of her fellow patients by the nurses. She learns from Dr. Fusuda that Takeno, who is a devoted follower of the Reiyūkai sect, attempted suicide and is being looked after by a friend of Atsuko. The story closes with Atsuko and a young nurse, whom she finds sympathetic, taking a night walk in the hospital's green area and watching the full September moon.

== Background ==
Han Ningen was based on the author's own experiences of her voluntary hospitalisation in a mental ward in 1952. It was first published in book form by Kodansha in 1954 and received the Peace Culture Award the same year. According to John Whittier Treat in his book Writing Ground Zero, the critical reception of Han ningen justified Ōta's reputation as "a bitter, disturbed, and perhaps even deranged woman whose writings on Hiroshima deserve to be discounted as equally bitter, disturbed, and deranged themselves." Although not published in English, a translation into German language appeared in 1984.

In addition to the bombing of Hiroshima and the Korean War, Ōta's story makes references to the suicide of writer Tamiki Hara, the Red Purge in Japan (dismissal of communists and suspected communists from government posts and teaching positions), and Ōta's encounter with a horribly disfigured young woman, a Hiroshima survivor like herself, which she also thematised in her 1953 short story Fireflies (Hotaru).

== See also ==
- Hibakusha

== Bibliography ==
- Ōta, Yōko (1982). "Han ningen". Ōta Yōko shū. Vol. 1. Tokyo: San'ichi Shobō.
