= Kikuchi Kan Prize =

Japanese literary award

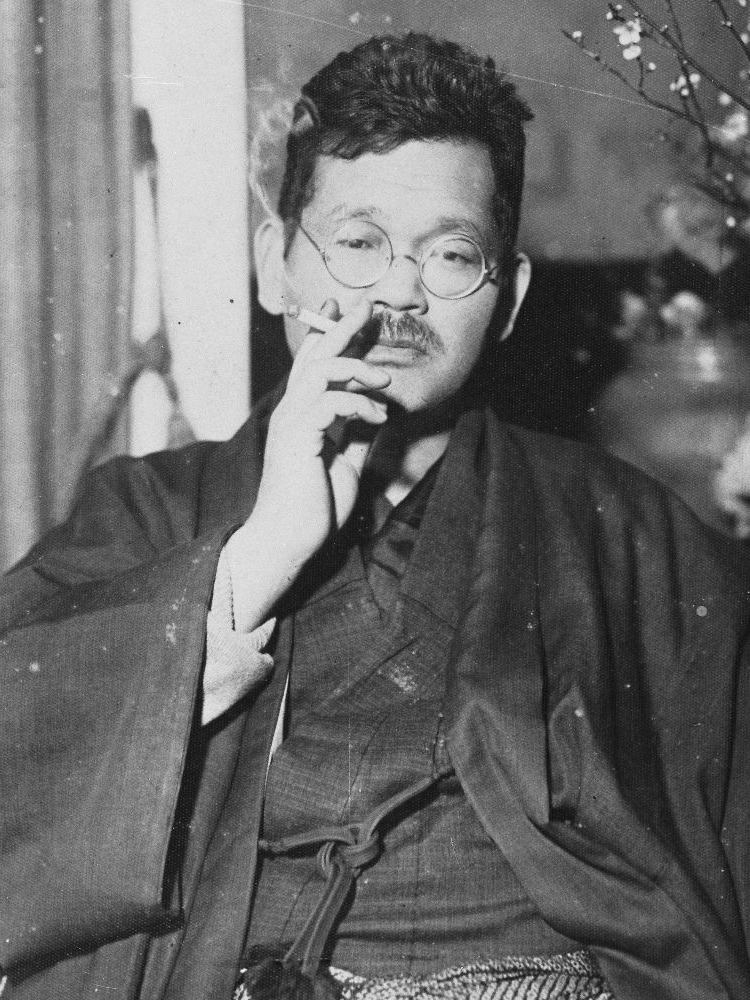
Kan Kikuchi (real name Hiroshi Kikuchi, 1888–1948)

The Kikuchi Kan Prize (Japanese: 菊池寛賞, Hepburn: Kikuchi Kan Shō) honors achievement in all aspects of Japanese culture, including literature and film. It was named in honor of Kikuchi Kan. The prize is presented annually by the literary magazine Bungei Shunjū and the Society for the Promotion of Japanese Literature.

== History ==
The original Kikuchi Kan Prize was proposed by Kikuchi as an award to honor the elders of the literary world. It was established in 1938. In keeping with the intent of the prize, the jury was made up of novelists aged 45 or younger, and recipients were novelists aged 46 or older. After a six-year hiatus, the award was revived in 1952 following Kikuchi's death. The range of recipients was enlarged to honor achievements in cinema, broadcasting, and other fields in contemporary literary culture. The jury meets in October to consider works published from September 1 of the previous year through August 31, and awards are announced in the December issue of Bungei Shunjū.

== Select list of prizewinners ==
The list of prizewinners includes a range of individual and institutional honorees.

- Iwanami Shoten, 1953
- Yomiuri Shimbun, 1953
- Eiji Yoshikawa, 1953
- Asahi Shimbun, 1954
- Ihei Kimura, 1955
- Chikage Awashima, 1956
- Mainichi Shimbun, 1957
- NHK, 1959
- Kan Shimozawa, 1962
- Donald Keene, 1962
- Kenichi Horie, 1963
- Oya Soichi, 1965
- Meiji Village Museum, 1966
- Yoshiya Nobuko, 1967
- Ishikawa Tatsuzō, 1969
- Matsumoto Seicho, 1970
- Ken Domon, 1971
- Toshiro Mayuzumi, 1971
- Mizukami Tsutomu, 1971
- Nagai Tatsuo, 1972
- Yoji Yamada, 1972
- Hideo Kobayashi, 1973
- Akira Yoshimura, 1973
- Masanori Hata, 1977
- Edward Seidensticker, 1977
- Tsuneari Fukuda, 1980
- Edwin McClellan, 1994
- Hisashi Inoue, 1999
- Shunzō Miyawaki, 1999
- Mitsumasa Anno, 2008
- Yoshiharu Habu, 2008
- Matsumoto Seicho Memorial Museum, 2008
- Eiji Mitooka, 2011
- Rieko Nakagawa and Yuriko Yamawaki, 2013
- Osamu Akimoto, 2016
- Yuzuru Hanyu, 2022
- Masako Nozawa, 2023

== See also ==
- List of Japanese literary awards
