= Kan Kikuchi =

Japanese writer (1888–1948)

- 菊池 寛
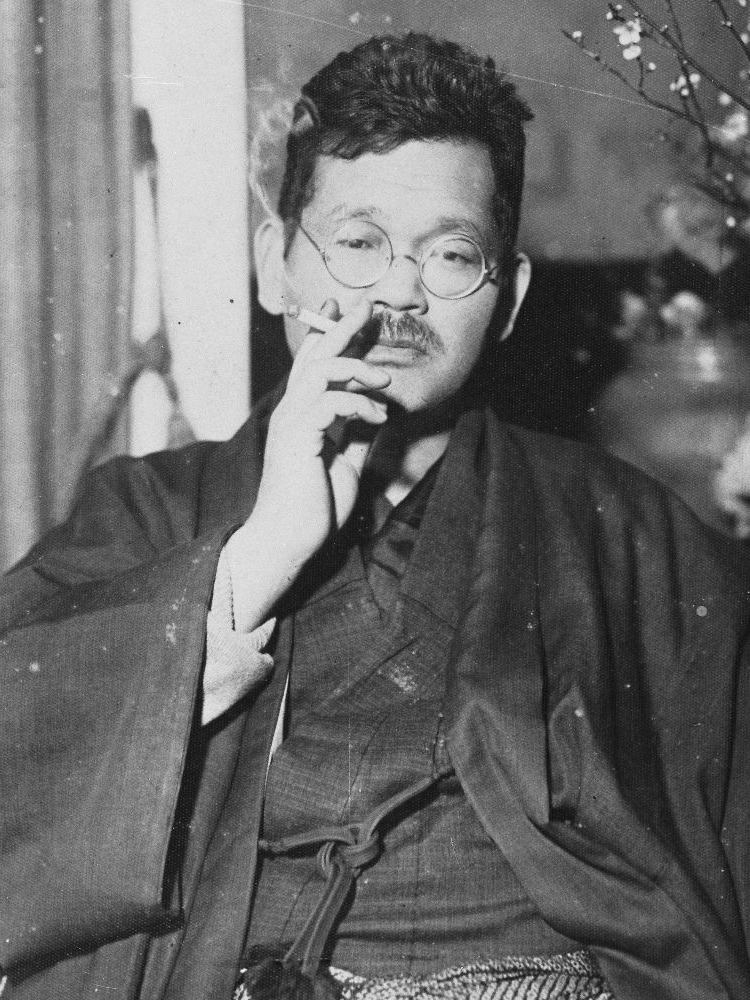
- Born: Hiroshi Kikuchi; December 26, 1888; Takamatsu, Kagawa
- Died: March 6, 1948 (aged 59)
- Occupation: Novelist

Hiroshi Kikuchi (菊池 寛, Kikuchi Hiroshi; December 26, 1888 – March 6, 1948), also known as Kan Kikuchi (which uses the same kanji as his real name), was a Japanese author and publisher. He established the publishing company Bungeishunjū, the monthly magazine of the same name, the Japan Writer's Association and both the Akutagawa and Naoki Prize for popular literature. He came to prominence for the plays Madame Pearl and Father Returns, but his ample support for the Imperial Japanese war effort led to his marginalization in the postwar period. He was also the head of Daiei Motion Picture Company (currently Kadokawa Pictures). He was known to have been an avid player of mahjong.

== Early life and career ==
Kikuchi was born on December 26, 1888, in Takamatsu, Kagawa Prefecture, Japan.

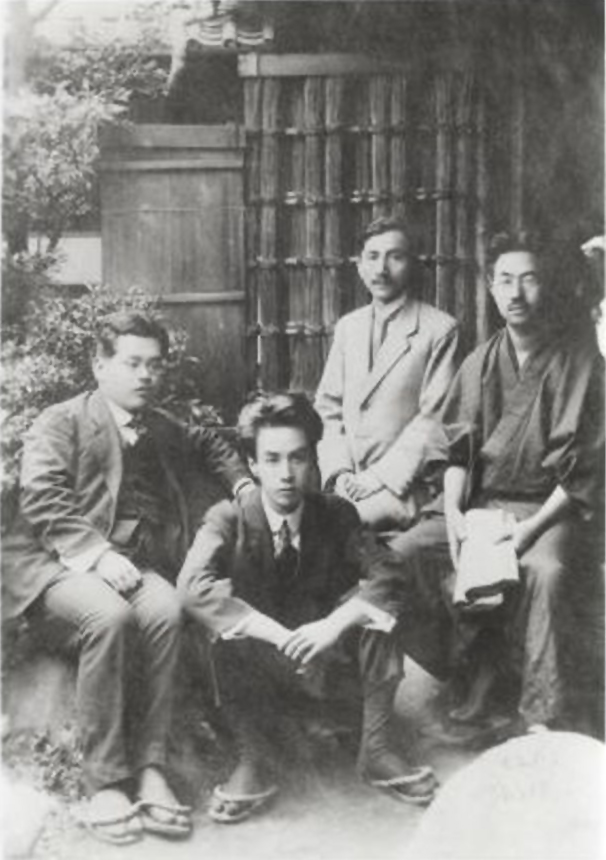
Kikuchi Kan with Ryunosuke and others

In 1904–1905 after the Russo-Japanese War, literature in Japan grew more modern, however he was also hailed as the most classic man in Japan. French Realism was one of the first influences that immersed into Japan's literature. Building from the famous and classic works from the West, which include diaries and autobiographies, Japanese writers formulated a style of fictional writing that is eventually called shinkyo-shosetsu. Other major influences from Western countries in Europe in addition to works from India and China contributed to the creation of modern literature in Japan. In comparison to literature in European countries, new Japanese literature did not achieve as much popularity; few works of Japanese playwrights were translated into European languages. Kikuchi Kan saw the language barrier and inaccuracy of translation as part of the central cause for this.

=== Irish influences ===
In 1924, shortly after Kaoru Osanai opened Tsukiji Little Theatre, Kikuchi Kan was the most celebrated playwright in Japan. Kan was widely claimed as "a playwright who transformed Irish plays into a Japanese context," including John Millington Synge's Deirdre of the Sorrows. When studying at the University of Kyoto, Kikuchi Kan had a great interest in modern drama, particularly Irish modern drama. Dramatists Kan studied included J.M. Synge and Edward Plunkett, 18th Baron of Dunsany.

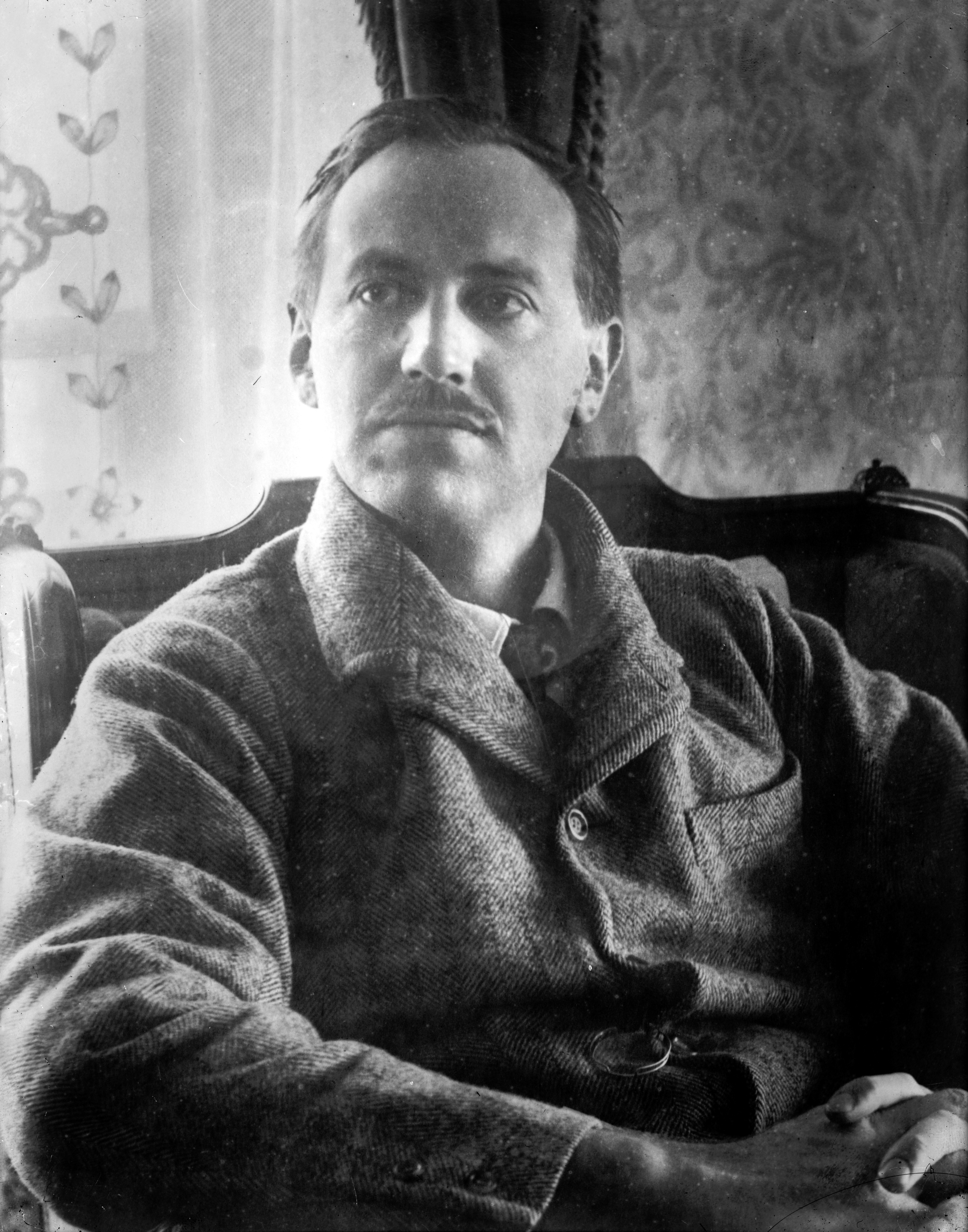
Edward Plunkett, 18th Baron Dunsany

After graduating from the University of Kyoto, Kan wrote detailed articles on Synge and Irish plays for Teikoku-Bungaku (帝国文学, Imperial Literature) and New Current of Thought. In 1925, Kan also published a book with Shuji Yamamoto, Eikoku Airan Kindaigeki Seizui (Quintessence of Modern Plays in England and Ireland). Kan's interests in Irish drama and J.S. Synge were also inspirations to his future works. In his Han-jijo-den (半自叙伝, Semi-Autobiography), Kan writes about his great interest in Irish drama.

=== Writing style ===
Though Kikuchi Kan recognized distinct characteristics between Western and Japanese cultures, he used his Japanese roots as the foundation of many of his works. This, in turn, resulted in Kikuchi Kan creating his style of writing in Japanese drama. One of his early works, Kayano Yane (茅の屋根, Thatched Cottage), represents one of Kikuchi Kan's portrayal of societal issues during his time, which increased his popularity in modern Japanese literature. Other themes of his dramas include issues of morality, money, class, and gender. Kikuchi Kan believes the nature of modern theatre is to shed light upon the wrongs of modern society and liberate Japan from those customs. The heavy influence of common issues in Kikuchi Kan's works gained accolades from critics and dramatists.

Elements of drama Kikuchi Kan considered to be the most effective are the one-act play and the use of a minimal number of characters. "The one-act play" he wrote, "is different from long plays – three-acts or five-acts. It should extract the most dramatic elements from all and has to effectively treat it within a limited time." With this short amount of time, Kikuchi Kan's portrays his message in a core event with meticulous use of exposition. One important element in his perspective is knowing the difference between writing stories as opposed to writing plays. In that limited time, the play must have the power to "physically bind the audience to the theatre seat," as opposed to stories that "the reader can put into his pocket." From 1914 to 1924, Kan wrote one-act plays for the leading coterie magazine at that time, New Tides of Thought (Shinshichō). New Tides of Thought magazine also contributed to the popularity of Taishō drama. In Kan's one-act plays, he focused on a single dramatic event and had the characters' actions revolve around that event to produce the most tension and most "dramatic force," for one-act plays "should extract the most dramatic elements...within a limited time."

=== Father Returns ===
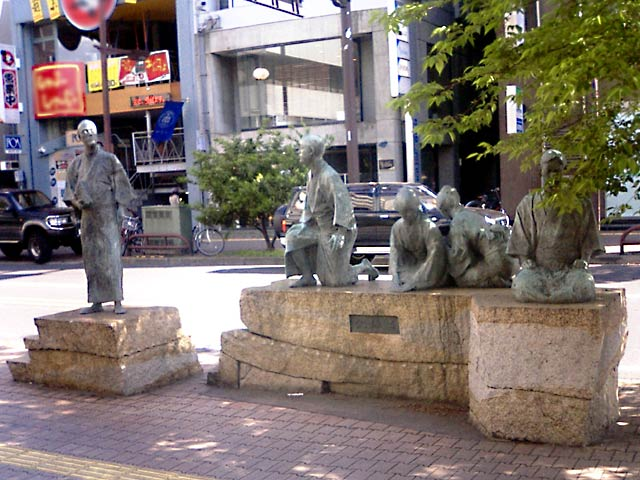
Father Returns statue

One of his most famous works, Chichi Kaeru (Father Returns), is a one-act play that mainly portrays the struggles of a father-son relationship. Father Returns opened in 1920, after being published in the journal New Tides of Thought in 1917. The story revolves around a conflict between a father and son. The eldest son, Ken'ichirō, despises his father, Sōtarō, for his cruel treatment of the family and for deserting them. As the play progresses, the audience learns that Ken'ichirō's hatred towards his father fueled his determination of surpassing his father by providing better support for his family in his absence. After Sōtarō returns one night, the family welcomes him but Ken'ichirō's confrontation with him ultimately drives Sōtarō to leave. The play concludes with Ken'ichirō's sudden change of heart towards Sōtarō and accepting him into the family. After Shinjirō, a younger brother, goes to bring Sōtarō back, the curtain closes before Sōtarō is found. The ending drove Takeda and Ennosuke to alter it to avoid ambiguity, but was changed back to the original to preserve the main message of the play.

=== Madame Pearl ===
Shinju fujin (真珠夫人, Madame Pearl) brought Kikuchi Kan to fame. This drama takes place in Japan and focuses on the theme of gender in society. The main character, a woman named Karasawa Ruriko 唐沢瑠璃子 is a baron's daughter who is forced into an arranged marriage with the rich Shōda Katsuhei 荘田勝平 to save the family from bankruptcy. Before and after Ruriko's arranged marriage to Katsuhei, she remained faithful to her feelings for Sugino Naoya 杉野直也, her first love, and decided to preserve her virginity. Due to Ruriko's choosing to be sexually pure, Katsuhei attempted to rape Ruriko but died from a sudden heart attack. From then on, she wanted to overcome the male dominance in the society she lived in. For a period of time Ruriko tricked men and played with their emotions, which lead many of them to violent deaths. However, Ruriko eventually was killed by one of her suitors. The name Shinju fujin symbolizes Ruriko's purity and preservation of chastity throughout her encounters with different men. She remained pure in body, mind, and soul like a pearl while she gradually rose in power over men. As the story unravels, it encourages the audience to think about Ruriko's motivation to carry out her actions and find the "truth" behind her thinking. According to Michiko Suzuki, this play became popular among female audiences because it gave them strength and the opportunity fulfill "the fantasy of female liberation".

Suzuki further argues that many audience members believed that Ruriko was inspired by Yanagihara Byakuren 柳原白蓮, who was widely known for her beauty, her talent in poetry, her relation to the emperor, and her marriage to coalmine magnate Itō Den'emon 伊藤傳右衞門. According to Suzuki, Byakuren herself asked Kikuchi Kan whether she played a role in creating Ruriko in Shinju fujin and Kikuchi confirmed that there was a connection. Suzuki also connects Ruriko to Nemesis, the goddess of revenge. Suzuki argues that, like the goddess of revenge, Ruriko wanted to avenge the women who have fallen victim to the "violence and self-centered desires of men."

== Naoki and Akutagawa Prizes ==
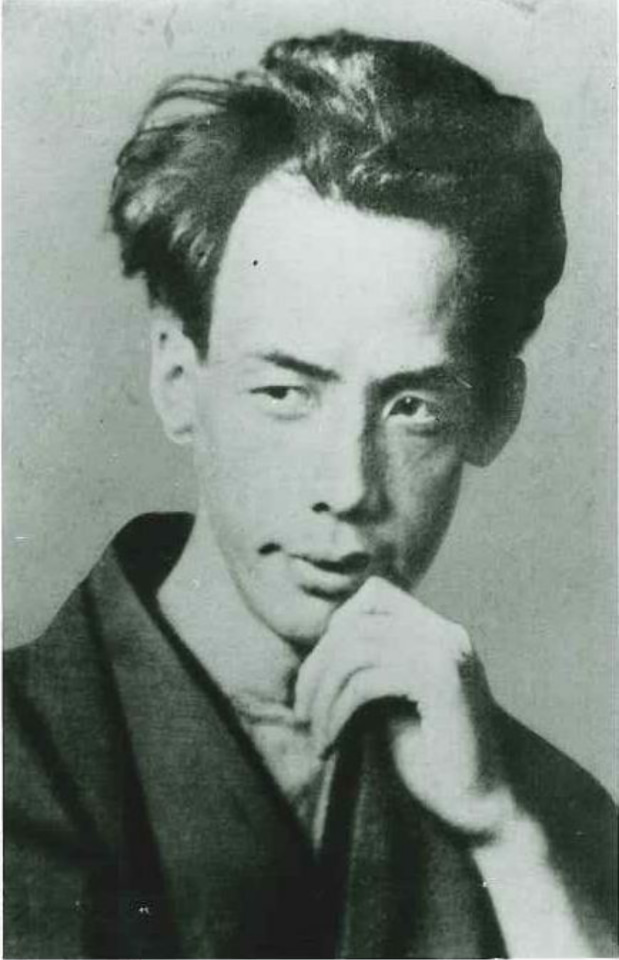
Akutagawa Ryunosuke

Kikuchi Kan dedicated the Akutagawa Prize to Ryūnosuke Akutagawa (芥川 龍之介) after his death in 1927. The Akutagawa Prize Committee was composed of the close friends of Bungei Shunjusha. The Akutagawa Prize was given every six months to rising authors of original literature (Sōsaku) that were published in any newspaper or magazine. The Akutagawa Prizes were published in Bungeishunjū issues. The prize included both a watch and a cash award of five hundred Japanese yen (¥).

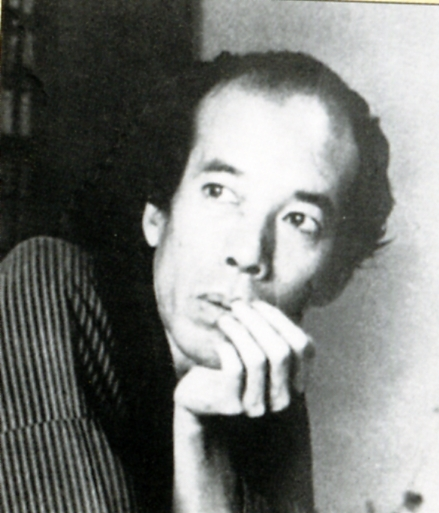
Naoki Sanjugo

The Naoki Prize was created by Kikuchi Kan as tribute to literary author Sanjugo Naoki (直木 三十五) after his death in February 1934. The Naoki Prize was given to rising authors of popular literature. The Naoki prizes were published in Oru Yomimono (オール讀物) issues.

The process of choosing recipients of the two prizes is for the committees to select already published manuscripts in Coterie and commercial magazines and newspapers. After producing the two prizes, Kikuchi Kan initially decided on having the prizes reflect the Kenshō shōsetsu type of award, in which submitted and unpublished manuscripts were selected by a committee. In brief, the Kenshō shōsetsu, the "prize-winning novels" are selected pieces of fiction novels published in newspapers and magazines that received considerable amounts of praise. The Akutagawa Prize committee in 1934 consisted of the members: Bungei Shunjusha, Yamamoto Yuzu, Haruo Satō, Jun'ichirō Tanizaki, Murō Saisei, Kōsaku Takii, Riichi Yokomitsu and Yasunari Kawabata. Kikuchi Kan, Masao Kume and Masajirō Kojima were in both Akutagawa and Naoki Prize Committees.

== Kikuchi Kan Prize ==
In 1938, the Kikuchi Kan Prize (菊池寛賞 Kikuchi Kan Shō) was created by Kikuchi Kan himself that recognizes authors' achievements. However, unlike the Naoki and Akutagawa Prizes, the Kikuchi Kan Prize is given to senior authors over age 45. The prize includes an award of one million yen and a table clock. This award was sponsored by the Association for the Promotion of Japanese Literature for six years before the cancellation of the prize. After Kikuchi Kan's death, the prize was brought back and is currently open to art, literature, film, and other genres. Recipients of this prize include Hakuchō Masamune and Yasushi Inoue.

== Later years ==
In 1938, Kikuchi joined the Pen butai (lit. "Pen corps"), a government organisation which consisted of authors who travelled the front during the Second Sino-Japanese War to write favourably of Japan's war efforts in China, and became head of the group's navy branch. He was later affiliated with the Nihon bungaku hōkokukai ("Patriotic Association for Japanese Literature"), a subordinate of the Cabinet Intelligence Bureau. After the war, he was purged from public service positions as a wartime collaborator.

== Selected work ==
Kan Kikuchi's published writings encompass 512 works in 683 publications in 7 languages and 2,341 library holdings.

- Okujō no Kyōjin (屋上の狂人) – The Housetop Madman
- Chichi Kaeru (父帰る) – The Father returns
- Mumei Sakka no Nikki (無名作家の日記) -Anonymous Writer’s Diary
- Onshū no Kanata ni (恩讐の彼方に) or Beyond the Pale of Vengeance
- Tadanaokyō Gyōjōki (忠直卿行状記)
- Rangaku Kotohajime (蘭学事始)
- Tōjūrō no Koi (藤十郎の恋) – Tōjūrō's love
  - film adaptations: Tōjūrō no Koi (1938 film) and Tōjūrō no Koi (1955 film)
- Shinju Fujin (真珠夫人)

== See also ==
- Kikuchi Kan Prize
- Japanese literature
- List of Japanese authors
- Akutagawa Prize
- Naoki Prize
