= Atomic bomb literature =

Japanese literary genre

Atomic bomb literature (原爆文学, Genbaku bungaku) is a literary genre in Japanese literature which comprises writings about the atomic bombings of Hiroshima and Nagasaki.

== Definition ==
The term "atomic bomb literature" came into wide use in the 1960s. Writings affiliated with the genre can include diaries, testimonial or documentary accounts, and fictional works like poetry, dramas, prose writings or manga about the bombings and their aftermath.

There are broadly three generations of atomic bomb writers. The first, made up of actual survivors of the bombings, who wrote of their own experiences, includes Yōko Ōta, Tamiki Hara, Shinoe Shōda, and Sankichi Tōge. The second, who wrote about the bomb addressing both individual and broader social and political issues it raises, includes Yoshie Hotta, Momo Iida, Kenzaburō Ōe, Masuji Ibuse, Ineko Sata and the early Mitsuharu Inoue. The third, whose writing looks into the past and the future in a post-nuclear world, includes Kōbō Abe, Makoto Oda, and the latter Inoue.

Yōko Ōta's short story Kaitei no yō na hikari ('A light as if from the depths') was published on 30 August 1945 in The Asahi Shimbun, making it the first published literary text on the atomic bomb. The following month, by directive of the Supreme Commander for the Allied Powers, the censorship of topics like the atomic bomb in the media came into operation, with the effect that books dealing with this topic, like a poetry collection of Sadako Kurihara or Yōko Ōta's novel City of Corpses, initially appeared only in abridged form.

In 1983, Holp Shuppan published the 15-volume Nihon no Genbaku Bungaku (日本の原爆文学, lit. 'Japanese Atomic Bomb Literature'), which contained fictional and nonfictional writings by the most prominent exponents of the genre.

Essays on the Red Circle Authors website also included works by non-Japanese authors in the atomic bomb literature cycle, like John Hersey's Hiroshima, which was originally published in The New Yorker in 1946. Still, anthologies like Nihon no Genbaku Bungaku or The Crazy Iris and Other Stories of the Atomic Aftermath are confined solely to Japanese writers.

== Selected works ==
- Yōko Ōta (大田洋子): Kaitei no yō na hikari (海底のような光, short story published in The Asahi Shinbun, 1945)
- Sadako Kurihara: Bringing Forth New Life (poem, 1946)
- Tamiki Hara: Summer Flower (short story, 1947)
- Shinoe Shōda: Sange (poetry collection, 1947)
- Yōko Ōta: City of Corpses (novel, 1948)
- Tamiki Hara: The Land of Heart's Desire (short story, 1951)
- Sankichi Tōge: Poems of the Atomic Bomb (poetry collection, 1951)
- Masuji Ibuse: The Crazy Iris (short story, 1951)
- Yōko Ōta: Ningen ranru (novel, 1951)
- Yōko Ōta: Fireflies (short story, 1953)
- Yōko Ōta: Han ningen (novel, 1954)
- Mitsuharu Inoue: The House of Hands (short story, 1960)
- Mitsuharu Inoue: Kyokō no kurēn (novel, 1960)
- Ineko Sata: The Colorless Paintings (short story, 1961)
- Hiroko Takenishi: The Rite (short story, 1963)
- Yoshie Hotta: Shinpan (novel, 1963)
- Masuji Ibuse: Black Rain (novel, 1965)
- Kenzaburō Ōe: Hiroshima Notes (essay collection, 1965)
- Momo Iida: Amerika no eiyu (novel, 1965)
- Katsuzō Oda: Human Ashes (short story, 1966)
- Takehiko Fukunaga: Shi no shima (novel, 1971)
- Taijun Takeda: Daiichi no botan (short story, 1971)
- Minako Gotō: Toki o hiku (short story, 1971)
- Ineko Sata: Juei (novel, 1972)
- Keiji Nakazawa: Barefoot Gen (manga series, 1973–1987)
- Kyōko Hayashi: Ritual of Death (short story, 1975)
- Kyōko Hayashi: The Empty Can (short story, 1978)
- Makoto Oda: H: A Hiroshima Novel (novel, 1980)

== Bibliography ==
- Nihon no Genbaku Bungaku. Tokyo: Holp Shuppan. 1983.
- Ōe, Kenzaburō, ed. (1985). The Crazy Iris and Other Stories of the Atomic Aftermath. New York: Grove Press.
- Goodman, David, ed. (1986). After Apocalypse: Four Japanese Plays of Hiroshima and Nagasaki. New York: Columbia University Press.
- Hersey, John (2009). Hiroshima (new ed.). London: Michael Joseph Ltd.

== See also ==
- List of books about nuclear issues
- List of films about nuclear issues
