= Mitsuharu Inoue =

Japanese writer (1926–1992)

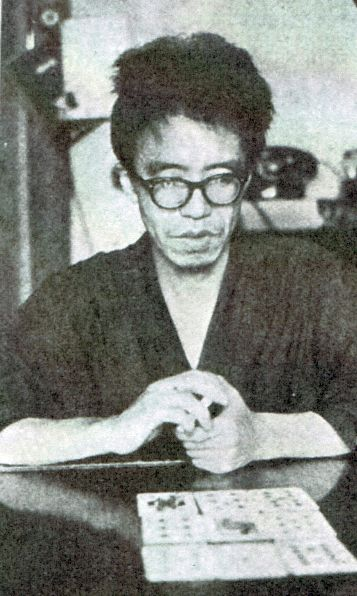
- Mitsuharu Inoue in 1964
- Born: May 15, 1926
- Died: May 30, 1992 (aged 66); Tokyo, Japan
- Occupation: Writer
- Spouse: Ikuko Inoue
- Children: Areno Inoue

Mitsuharu Inoue (井上光晴, Inoue Mitsuharu; May 15, 1926 – May 30, 1992) was a Japanese writer of novels, short stories, poetry and essays, who has been associated with Japanese postwar literature and the Atomic bomb literature genre.

== Biography ==
Inoue was born in 1926 as the son of a pottery manufacturer. While Inoue asserted that he was born in Lüshun, China, other sources name Kurume in Fukuoka Prefecture as the actual place of birth. (Note: J. Scott Miller gives Fukuoka Prefecture as Inoue's actual place of birth, as does the entry for Inoue at the NHK website and statements by relatives in the documentary film A Dedicated Life.) After his mother had left the family, he and his sister were raised by their grandmother. As a youth, he worked in a steel factory in Amagasaki and a coal mine in Nagasaki, before graduating from the Army Radio Weapon Technology Training Center. In 1946, he joined the Japanese Communist Party (JCP), but after facing criticism for his short story Kakarezaru isshō (lit. "An Unwritten Chapter", 1950) and his critical attitude towards Stalinism, he and the JCP broke ties in 1953.

Inoue's writings deal extensively with social and political issues, such as the living conditions of mining workers, Koreans in Japan and the Burakumin, the Korean War, and the effect of the atomic bomb. His most acknowledged works include Kyokō no kurēn (lit. "Fictitious Crane", 1960) and Chi no mure (lit. "People of the Land", 1963). In the Kenzaburō Ōe edited anthology The Crazy Iris and Other Stories of the Atomic Aftermath, Inoue was attested to "capture the tension of post-war Japan in a unique and distinguished style". In 1970, he established and edited the quarterly literary magazine Henkyō ("Frontier"). In addition, he constituted literary schools for aspiring writers. Translations of his works appeared in English, German, Russian, Czech and Serbian language anthologies, in particular his short story The House of Hands about a group of survivors of the atomic bombing of Nagasaki.

Inoue died of cancer in 1992. His last years living with his illness were documented in Kazuo Hara's film A Dedicated Life (Zenshin shosetsuka), which revealed that many details about his life were his own inventions. In his memory, a museum was established and a monument erected in Sakito (now Sakai), Nagasaki.

His eldest daughter is the novelist and translator Areno Inoue.

== Selected works ==
- 1950: Kakarezaru isshō
- 1953: Nagagutsu jima
- 1960: The House of Hands (Te no ie)
- 1960: Kyokō no kurēn
- 1963: Chi no mure
- 1963–64: Kōhai no natsu
- 1965: Takoku no shi
- 1966: Kuroi shinrin
- 1966: Akai temari
- 1973: Kokoro yasashiki hangyakusha
- 1976: Maruyama Ransuiro no yujotachi
- 1982: Ashita

== Translations ==
- Inoue, Mitsuharu (1985). "The House of Hands". In Ōe, Kenzaburō (ed.). The Crazy Iris and Other Stories of the Atomic Aftermath. New York: Grove Press.

== Film adaptations ==
- 1970: Apart from Life (Chi no mure), directed by Kei Kumai
- 1988: Tomorrow (Tomorrow – Ashita), directed by Kazuo Kuroki
