= Tamiki Hara =

Japanese writer

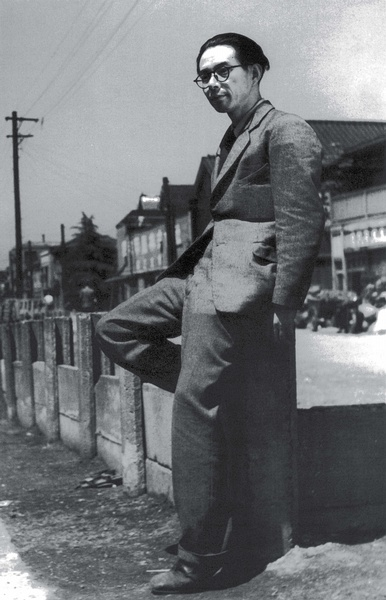
- Born: 15 November 1905; Hiroshima, Japan
- Died: 13 March 1951 (aged 45); Tokyo, Japan
- Education: Keio University
- Occupation: Writer
- Spouse: Sadae Sasaki (1933–1944)
- Writing career
- Genre: Atomic bomb literature

Tamiki Hara (原民喜, Hara Tamiki; 15 November 1905 – 13 March 1951) was a Japanese writer and survivor of the bombing of Hiroshima, known for his works in the atomic bomb literature genre.

== Biography ==
Hara was born in Hiroshima in 1905. In his early years, he was an introverted personality who suffered from anxiety states. While he was a middle school student, Hara became familiar with Russian literature, and also began to write poetry. He particularly admired the poets Murō Saisei and Paul Verlaine. After graduating from the English literature department of Keio University, he published prose and poetry works in Mita Bungaku magazine. In 1933, he married Sadae Sasaki, sister of literary critic Kiichi Sasaki. For a limited time, he was also affiliated with Japan's left wing movement.

Sadae died in 1944 after long years of illness. Hara had once said of her, "were my wife to die before me, I would live only one year longer to leave behind a volume of beautiful, sad poetry". One year later, he was exposed to the atomic bombing of Hiroshima at his parents' home. These two traumatic experiences became central to his work.

His best-known work, Summer Flower (Note: George Saito's repeatedly re-printed English translation uses the singular Summer Flower, while Richard H. Minear's translation in the anthology Hiroshima: Three Witnesses uses the plural Summer Flowers.) (Natsu no Hana), an account of the devastation he witnessed in Hiroshima, was published in June 1947 and received the first Takitaro Minakami Prize. Two further sections of this story followed later, From the Ruins (Haikyou kara) in November 1947, and Prelude to Annihilation (Kaimetsu no joukyoku) in January 1949. He also wrote poems on the same theme, while his 1950 short story Utsukushiki shi no kishi ni (lit. "On the brink of a beautiful death") documented his wife's last days. The 1949 Chinkonka (lit. "Requiem") treated Sadae's death and the deaths in Hiroshima almost as one single loss.

The 1951 short story The Land of Heart's Desire (Shingan no kuni) was Hara's final, posthumously published work. His already fragile mental state had been exacerbated by the outbreak of the Korean War and president Truman's public consideration of the use of atomic bombs. He committed suicide in Tokyo on March 13, 1951, by lying down on the tracks of an oncoming train, a death which he had already contemplated in his last story.

== Legacy ==
=== In literature ===
Writer Yōko Ōta repeatedly thematised Hara's suicide in her works, such as the 1953–54 short stories Fireflies and Residues of Squalor, and her 1954 novel Han ningen.

=== Commemoration ===
An epitaph to Tamiki Hara was built at the site of Hiroshima Castle in November 1951 by writers and literary scholars who had been close to him. After it had been repeatedly exposed to vandalism, it was remodeled and moved to the present site next to the Atomic Bomb Dome in July 1967. The monument bears an inscription of a poem by Hara which reads:

Engraved in stone long ago,
Lost in the shifting sand,
In the midst of a crumbling world,
The vision of one flower.

（遠き日の石に刻み/砂に影おち/崩れ墜つ/天地のまなか/一輪の花の幻）

The anniversary of Tamiki Hara's death was named Kagenki (花幻忌, "Flower vision mourning"). The "Kagenki society", formed by admirers of Hara's work, hosted an exhibition in commemoration of the 50th anniversary of Hara's death in 2001, and organises a memorial service in front of his monument every year.

== Selected works ==
- 1945: Genbaku hisai-ji no nōto (published 1953)
- 1947: Summer Flower
- 1947: From the Ruins
- 1949: Prelude to Annihilation
- 1949: Chinkonka
- 1950: Utsukushiki shi no kishi ni
- 1951: The Land of Heart's Desire

== Bibliography ==
- Hara, Tamiki (1966). "Summer Flower". In Saeki, Shoichi (ed.). The Shadow of Sunrise: Selected Stories of Japan and the War. Tokyo: Kodansha International.
- Hara, Tamiki (1981). "Summer Flower". In Saeki, Shoichi (ed.). The Catch and Other War Stories. Tokyo: Kodansha International.
- Hara, Tamiki (1985). "Summer Flower, The Land of Heart's Desire". In Ōe, Kenzaburō (ed.). The Crazy Iris and Other Stories of the Atomic Aftermath. New York: Grove Press.
- Hara, Tamiki (1990). "Summer Flowers (Summer Flowers, From the Ruins, Prelude to Annihilation)". In Minear, Richard H. (ed.). Hiroshima: Three Witnesses. Princeton: Princeton University Press.
- Hara, Tamiki (1995). "This is a Human Being". In Graham, Desmond (ed.). Poetry Of The Second World War. Princeton: Random House.
