= Pamela Rotner Sakamoto =

American historian

Pamela Rotner Sakamoto is an American historian and writer on Japanese and Japanese American history, best known for her 2016 book Midnight in Broad Daylight. As of June 2024 she teaches history at Punahou School in Honolulu, Hawaii.

== Early life and education ==
Pamela Rotner Sakamoto was born in Chapel Hill, North Carolina, the son of Howard Rotner. and grew up in Swampscott, Massachusetts, where she attended Swampscott High School.

She is a Phi Beta Kappa graduate of Amherst College (1984) and holds a doctorate from the Fletcher School of Law and Diplomacy at Tufts University.

Sakamoto lived in Kyoto and Tokyo for seventeen years and is fluent in Japanese.

== Career ==
In 2007, Sakamoto moved to Honolulu, Hawaii, where she teaches history at Punahou School. As of June 2024 she is coordinator of the Davis Democracy Initiative within the Social Studies Faculty.

She also works as an expert consultant on Japan-related projects for the United States Holocaust Memorial Museum in Washington, D.C.

== Books ==
Sakamoto is the author of Japanese Diplomats and Jewish Refugees (1998), based on her dissertation. This work was among the first English-language works that investigated Japanese diplomat Chiune Sugihara and the role of Japanese diplomacy in saving thousands of Jewish lives on the eve of the Holocaust.

Her 2016 book Midnight in Broad Daylight, a true-life story about the Japanese-American Fukuhara family divided by World War II, and the Japanese-American war hero Harry K. Fukuhara, was listed by Kirkus Reviews as one of the best nonfiction books of 2016. This book also touches on the internment of Japanese Americans, life in wartime Japan, the Japanese-American Military Intelligence Service, and the atomic bombing of Hiroshima. It takes its title from a poem by Japanese poet and peace activist Sankichi Tōge.

== Recognition ==
At Amherst College, Sakamoto was a Phi Beta Kappa student and a XXIV Amherst-Doshisha Fellow. She won the Pedro Grases Award for Excellence in Spanish, and the Robert L. Leeds Jr. Honor Award for Dedication to Social Programs.

At the Fletcher School, she was awarded the Charlotte W. Newcombe Doctoral Dissertation Fellowship by the Woodrow Wilson National Fellowship Foundation.

Midnight in Broad Daylight garnered starred reviews in Kirkus Reviews and the Library Journal, and was Amazon Editors' "Best of the Month Picks" for January 2016 in both History and Nonfiction categories.

== Personal life ==
From the age of three, she has suffered from Juvenile Rheumatoid Arthritis.

== Bibliography ==
- Japanese Diplomats and Jewish Refugees (Praeger, 1998)
- Midnight in Broad Daylight: A Japanese American Family Caught Between Two Worlds (HarperCollins, 2016) ISBN 978-0-06-235193-7
