= Bungei Shunjū (magazine) =

Japanese political and literary magazine

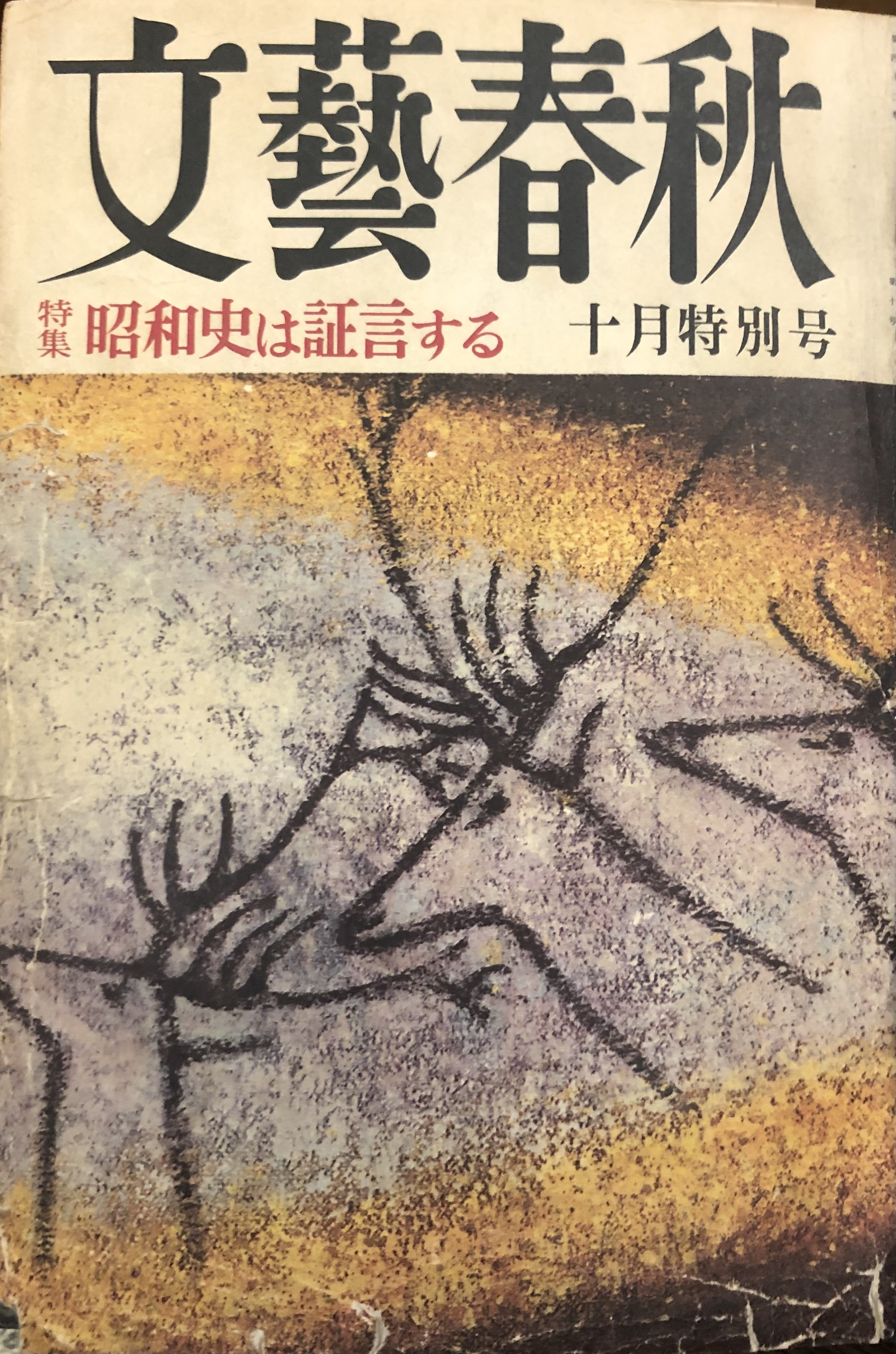
- October 1964 issue
- Categories: Political; Literary
- Frequency: Monthly
- Publisher: Bungeishunjū
- Founder: Kan Kikuchi
- Founded: 1923; 103 years ago
- Country: Japan
- Based in: Tokyo
- Language: Japanese
- Website: Bungeishunjū

Bungei Shunjū (文藝春秋) (Annals of Art and Culture) is a Japanese monthly magazine based in Tokyo, Japan.

== History and profile ==
Bungei Shunjū was started by writer Kikuchi Kan (1888–1948) in 1923. The name of the magazine and publishing house came from the title of the literary review column in the magazine Shinchō by Kan. Bungei Shunjū is published on a monthly basis. The magazine's stance is described as conservative, with strong support for the emperor. The headquarters of the magazine is in Tokyo.

Bungei Shunjū covers a wide range of topics from politics to sports. Each issue usually contains about 30 articles by politicians, researchers, journalists or non-fiction writers. It is claimed that the magazine never features articles by members of the Japanese Communist Party or the Social Democratic Party but this is actually false as there are some exceptions. It has published writing by Takako Doi, former leader of the Japan Socialist Party, in September 2005, and by Tetsuzo Fuwa, the chairman of the secretariat of the JCP, when the Soviet Union collapsed.

In 1974 Bungei Shunjū published an article concerning bribery allegations regarding the then Prime Minister Kakuei Tanaka. Following the event he was arrested in 1976.

The magazine grants literary awards every year. The February issues announces recipients of The Reader's Prize (文藝春秋読者賞, Bungei shunjū dokusha shō). In the March and September issues the Akutagawa Prize, established in 1935, recipients are announced; in June issues the Ohya non-fiction prize; in July issues the recipients of the Matsumoto Seichō prize; and the December issues announce recipients of the Kikuchi Kan prize which was started by the magazine in 1939. The prize is named for Kikuchi Kan who is the founder of the magazine.

In 2006 Bungei Shunjū sold 620,850 copies.
