= Tabuchi =

Tabuchi (written: 田淵 or 田渕) is a Japanese surname. Notable people with the surname include:

- Kazuhiko Tabuchi (田淵 和彦, born 1936), Japanese fencer
- Kaneyoshi Tabuchi (田渕 銀芳, 1917–1997), Japanese photographer
- Kōichi Tabuchi (田淵 幸一, born 1946), Japanese baseball player and manager
- Ryuji Tabuchi (田渕 龍二, born 1973), Japanese footballer
- Shoji Tabuchi (田淵 章二, 1944–2023), Japanese-American country musician and singer
- Susumu Tabuchi (田渕 晋, born 1980), Japanese swimmer
- Yukio Tabuchi (田淵 行男, 1905–1989), Japanese photographer
