= Masao Kume =

Japanese writer (1891–1952)

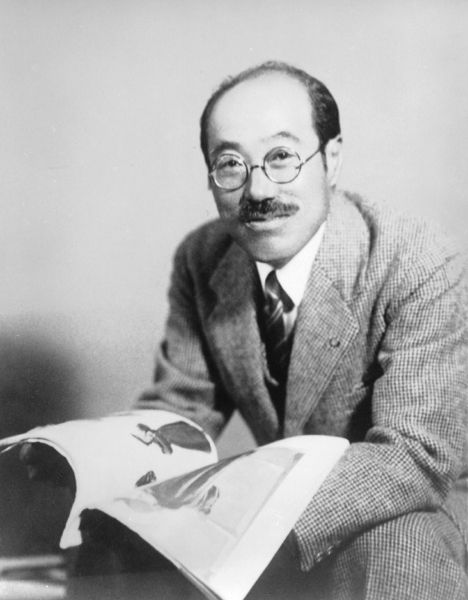
- Kume
- Born: 23 November 1891; Ueda, Nagano, Japan
- Died: 1 March 1952 (aged 60); Kamakura, Japan
- Occupation: writer
- Writing career
- Genres: haiku poetry, novels, stage plays
- Notable works: Tsuki yori no shisha (Messenger from the Moon, 1933)

Masao Kume (久米 正雄, Kume Masao; 23 November 1891 – 1 March 1952) was a Japanese popular playwright, novelist and haiku poet (under the pen-name of Santei) active during the late Taishō and early Shōwa periods of Japan. His wife and the wife of Nagai Tatsuo were sisters, making them brothers-in-law.

== Early life ==
Kume was born in Ueda city, Nagano prefecture. His father was the principal of the local elementary school, and committed suicide in 1897 to take responsibility for a fire which destroyed a portion of the school where a portrait of Emperor Meiji had been displayed. Kume moved with his mother to her home in Kōriyama city, Fukushima prefecture, where he was raised.

== Literary career ==
Kume exhibited a talent for haiku poetry even in elementary school. After graduating from Tokyo Imperial University Department of Literature under Natsume Sōseki (together with classmates Ryūnosuke Akutagawa and Kan Kikuchi), he joined a literary group that published a literary magazine called Shinshichō (新思潮, New Currents of Thought).

Kume's debut as a playwright came with Gyunyuya no Kyōdai ("Milkman’s Siblings"), which was staged in 1914 and proved to be very popular. By 1916, he had published his first novel Chichi no Shi ("My Father's Death") and a play Abukuma Shinju ("Love Suicides at Abukuma"). In 1918, he founded the Kokumin Bungeikai ("People's Arts Movement") with Kaoru Osanai and Mantarō Kubota. His fame and kudos as a novelist grew when he wrote a series of stories, including Hotaru Gusa ("Firefly Weeds"), Hasen ("Shipwreck"), and Bosan ("Visit to a Grave"), about his unrequited love for Natsume Sōseki's eldest daughter (he proposed to her via her parents, as was the prevailing practice at the time, but she surprised everyone by announcing her love for Kume's classmate and close friend Yuzuru Matsuoka instead). In 1925, Kume wrote an essay, Shishōsetsu to Shinkyō shōsetsu ("The I-Novel and the Mental State Novel"), which became a classic in defining those two literary forms. In 1933, he wrote a melodramatic novel Tsuki yori no shisha ("Messenger from the Moon"), which was a major best-seller. Kume was arrested in Kamakura in 1933, along with fellow literati Matsutarō Kawaguchi and Ton Satomi for illegal card gambling. In 1938, Kume joined the Pen butai (lit. "Pen corps"), a government organisation consisting of authors who travelled the front during the Second Sino-Japanese War to write favourably of Japan's war efforts in China, and later the Nihon bungaku hōkokukai ("Patriotic Association for Japanese Literature"), led by Sohō Tokutomi and himself.

== Life in Kamakura ==
Kume relocated from Tokyo to ancient capital Kamakura, Kanagawa prefecture due to the Great Kantō earthquake of 1923, residing there until his death in 1952 at the age of 60. He was a prominent figure in Kamakura literary circles, helping to establish the Kamakura P.E.N. Club, the Kamakura Carnival, and running the Kamakura Bunko lending library.

Kume suffered from high blood pressure much of his life, and died of a cerebral hemorrhage. His grave is at the temple of Zuisen-ji in Kamakura. After Kume's death, his house was physically relocated from the Nikaido district of Kamakura to Kōriyama in Fukushima prefecture, where it now houses the Kōriyama Bunkagu no Mori Museum. There is a bronze statue of Kume in the grounds of Hase-dera in Kamakura.

== See also ==
- Japanese literature
- List of Japanese authors
