= Masajirō Kojima =

Japanese writer (1894–1994)

- 小島 政二郎
- Masajirō Kojima
- Born: January 31, 1894; Tokyo, Japan
- Died: March 24, 1994 (aged 100); Kamakura, Kanagawa, Japan
- Resting place: Yanaka Cemetery, Tokyo.
- Education: Keio University
- Occupation: Writer
- Writing career
- Language: Japanese
- Genres: children's literature, novels

Masajirō Kojima (小島 政二郎, Kojima Masajirō; January 31, 1894 – March 24, 1994) was a Japanese novelist active in Shōwa period Japan.

== Biography ==
Kojima was born in the plebeian Shitaya district of Tokyo to a family of clothing merchants. While attending Keio University he studied Edo period Japanese literature and the works of European authors. He was especially attracted to the works of Nagai Kafū and Mori Ōgai. His literary career began as a student, when he contributed short stories to the journal of Keio University's literature department, Mita Bungaku.

After graduation in 1918, he worked with children's literature, editing the literary magazine, Akai Tori ("Red Bird"), and writing tales for children.

However, Kojima established himself as a mainstream author with serious, adult-orientated stories, such as Ichimae Kanban, ("One Card") based on the life of a professional storyteller, and Ie ("Family"), the story of relatives who were forced out of their home. He later gained a reputation as a writer of popular fiction with such stories as Midori no Kishi ("Green Knight"), Kaiso ("Seaweed"), and Hitozuma Tsubaki ("Tsubaki, a Married Woman"). As many of his works dealt with human relationships, his writings were a favorite of movie directors and script writers.

His Ganchu no Hito ("Centre of Attention"), a semi-documentary work on his awakening to the possibilities of literature was almost a history of Taishō period Japanese literature, and was highly praised by the famed authors Natsume Sōseki and Kikuchi Kan. Along with Kikuchi Kan, he was one of the pallbearers at the funeral of Akutagawa Ryunosuke in 1927

In 1938, Kojima joined the Pen butai (lit. "Pen corps"), a government organisation which consisted of authors who travelled the front during the Second Sino-Japanese War to write favourably of Japan's war efforts in China. After World War II he wrote a number of biographical works, including Taifu no Me no yo no ("Like the Eye of a Typhoon"), (later retitled, Suzuki Miekichi), Ogai, Kafu, Mantaro, about the three writers he respected, and Encho.

Kojima lived briefly in Kamakura, Kanagawa prefecture in the 1930s but returned to Tokyo shortly afterwards. He served many years on the review committee for the Akutagawa Prize and the Naoki Prize.

He returned to Kamakura in 1944, where he lived till his death in 1994 at the age of 100. He broke his thigh in an accident at home in 1983, and was hospitalized for the remainder of his days, although he kept writing from his hospital bed until well into the 90s. His grave is at the temple of Tenno-ji in Yanaka Cemetery.

== See also ==
- Japanese literature
- List of Japanese authors
