= Cabinet Intelligence Bureau =

The Cabinet Intelligence Bureau (内閣情報局, Naikaku Jōhōkyoku), often translated as Cabinet Information Bureau, was a government organization in Japan. It was founded in 1940 at the request of Prime Minister Konoe Fumimaro. The organization's main objective was to improve pro-Japan public opinion around what was happening in World War II. Its main responsibilities included gathering information, reporting advertisements, and regulation or prohibition of publications. They distributed government propaganda both within and outside of Japan. In all, around 160 officers were employed by the organization.

== History ==
In the late 1930s, the government redefined the term "citizen" as an agent who contribute to a war of their own will, but under the influence of government officials, critics, and others.

The government promoted the concept of "total war". Private citizens were expected to contribute to the war. The government used mass media in order to promote patriotism and participation. The media was used to oppose enemy ideology and win ideological warfare. This was called "the theory of ideological and advertised warfare". The mass media were defined as a rational way to produce "citizens". For example, advertising discourse emphasized the existence of the enemy in order to promote "independence" and argue that "capitalism" is the worst enemy.

The Cabinet Intelligence Committee was established as Japan's first national central intelligence organization in July 1936. The Cabinet Intelligence Committee, which was reorganized and reinforced by additional work for the national spiritual mobilization movement in September 1937, became the Cabinet Intelligence Department. However, both the Cabinet Intelligence Committee and the Cabinet Intelligence Department were mainly responsible for liaison and coordination of information and advertising, both of which were controlled by individual ministries. Direction from Prime Minister Konoe Fumimaro made the Cabinet Intelligence Department more reliable, and in December 1940 he officially founded the Cabinet Intelligence Bureau.

The organization used the Imperial Theatre in Hibiya, Tokyo as its office. The first president of the organization was Nobuhumi Ito, followed by Masayuki Tani, Eiji Amou, Taketora Ogata, Hiroshi Shimomura, and Tatsuo Kawai.

== Organizational structure ==
The Cabinet Intelligence Bureau had hierarchies consisting of four principal levels:

- President
- Deputy director of cabinet information
- Executive Secretary
- Divisions
- Administrative manager
  - The first department: in charge of planning.
  - The second department: the role of reporting.
  - The third department: forced on a foreign policy.
  - The fourth department: responsible for regulation.
  - The fifth department: related to culture.

In total, thirty active military officers who belonged to the navy or army were assigned to each department. In other words, the organization was controlled and impacted by military authority. The most important department took control of the circulation of newspapers and was in charge of regulation and instruction, which was related to general broadcasting. The organization's role transitioned from "the regulation of speech" at the beginning of the Pacific War, to "the components of speech". The organization was used to regulate speech on a mandatory basis. Furthermore, they divested editorial control from newspaper publishing companies completely and participated in the process to make newspapers by "interview", "request", "explanation", and "instruction".

== The end of the organization ==
The Cabinet Intelligence Bureau was not successful in their mission to control the mass media, and sections of the country remained beyond their influence. When Japan lost World War II in April 1945, the organization began to close down. The organization did briefly continue to work after the defeat, however the organization finally suspended its functions, such as the regulation of and instruction for the mass media, as well as its objective to be published as a memorandum which was related to the additional measure of freedom for newspapers. In one of its final acts the organization prohibited the release of every newspaper which posted photographs of the emperor of Japan meeting General MacArthur in September 1945. The organization was fully abolished on December 31, 1945.

== The Cabinet Intelligence organizations' impact ==
=== Exhibition of ideological warfare ===
The Cabinet Intelligence Department hosted the exhibition of ideological warfare in February 1938 and exhibited various materials and productions. For example, posters of national spiritual mobilization movement, anti-Japanese in China and the Soviet Union, a statement which was related to the policy of socialism and published by Gaku Sano and Sadachika Nabeyama, and a panorama titled "The second Sino-Japanese War and Ideological warfare". They tried to make the component visually and widely in order to make citizens understand the national propaganda from the position of Japanese total war system.

=== Photo Weekly Report ===
As one of the tools of enlightenment advertisement in The Cabinet Information Bureau, Shashin Shūhō (写真週報, 'Photo Weekly Report') was published in February 1938 after half a month of Sino-Japanese War and discontinued in July 1945. The magazine avoided the difficult expression and used not only sentences but also pictures in order to make citizens understand the government propaganda more easily. The magazine was popular among the public and was subscribed to by each community, school, and workplace. It was called "the best national propaganda magazine in East Asia".
