= Mita Bungaku =

Japanese literary magazine

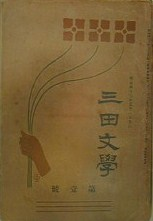
First issue

Mita Bungaku (三田文學) is a Japanese literary magazine established in 1910 at Keio University that published early works by young Japanese authors such as Yōjirō Ishizaka, Kyōka Izumi, Hakushū Kitahara, Jun'ichirō Tanizaki, Takitarō Minakami, Kojima Masajirō, Ryūnosuke Akutagawa, and Ayako Sono.

Mita Bungaku was established by student and author Mantarō Kubota and others with help from Kafū Nagai in 1910. The magazine is published monthly.
