= Yōko Ōta =

Japanese writer

- Born: Hatsuko Fukuda; 20 February 1903 or 18 November 1906; Hiroshima, Japan
- Died: 10 December 1963; Inawashiro, Japan
- Occupation: Writer
- Genre: Atomic bomb literature

Yōko Ōta (大田 洋子, Ōta Yōko, 20 February 1903 or 18 November 1906 (Note: Ōta's date of birth is debated. Richard H. Minear and Jay Rubin give 1903 as her year of birth, other sources like Kenzaburō Ōe's anthology The Crazy Iris and Other Stories of the Atomic Aftermath give 1906.) – 10 December 1963) was a Japanese writer. Many of her works are associated with the Atomic bomb literature genre.

== Biography ==
Ōta was born Hatsuko (初子, "first born") Fukuda in Hiroshima (Note: Minear and Rubin give the village of Kushima outside of Hiroshima as her place of birth.) to a wealthy landowner and his second wife Tomi. In 1910, her mother divorced her husband and gave her in adoption to a family named Ōta, but she was later taken back into the household of her mother's third husband. As a young girl she read Takuboku Ishikawa and Shūsei Tokuda, as well as Goethe, Heine and Tolstoy. After graduating from high school in 1920, she worked briefly as a primary school teacher before taking various jobs as a secretary and typist. She married in 1926, but soon left her husband after being confronted with the fact that he was already married, and had her child adopted. After repeated contributions to Nyonin Geijutsu, a magazine solely dedicated to female writers, she moved to Tokyo for the second time (after a previous one-year-long stay) in 1930. She continued publishing stories in other journals and newspapers, including a novel which fictionalised her second failed marriage (1936–37).

In 1940, Ōta's war novel Sakura no kuni ("The cherry land") was awarded a prize by the Asahi Shimbun, and received considerable public acclaim. She continued with a series of works in favour of Japan's expansive foreign politics and war efforts, which she later omitted from her curriculum vitae. In August 1945 she experienced and survived the atomic bombing of Hiroshima. Her short story Katei no yō na hikari ("A light as if from the depths") was published on 30 August 1945 in the Asahi Shimbun, making it the first published literary text on the atomic bomb. Stricken with the fear that she would become a victim of radiation sickness, she worked feverishly to complete City of Corpses (Shikabane no machi), an account of her experiences in Hiroshima at the time of the bombing. The novel was written in the autumn of 1945, but then was censored and finally published three years later with portions deleted. An unedited version was eventually published in 1950. This was followed by Ningen ranru ("Human tatters", 1951), which was awarded the Women's Literary Prize.

Ōta's 1953 short story Fireflies (Hotaru) follows the protagonist's meetings with survivors of the Hiroshima bombing and also addresses, as do some of her other works from that era, the suicide of writer Tamiki Hara. Her novel Han ningen ("Half human"), first published in 1954 and awarded the Peace Cultural Award, portrays an author haunted by memories of the atomic bombing and living in fear of radiation sickness and an impending world war. As John Whittier Treat wrote in his book Writing Ground Zero, the critical reception of Han ningen justified Ōta's reputation as "a bitter, disturbed, and perhaps even deranged woman whose writings on Hiroshima deserve to be discounted as equally bitter, disturbed, and deranged themselves." The possibility that she might die from the atomic bomb's aftereffects stayed with her for the rest of her life.

Ōta died of a heart attack in 1963 in Fukushima Prefecture while working on a new novel. The four-volume (though incomplete) Ōta Yōko shū ("Collected works of Ōta Yōko"), edited by Ineko Sata et al., was published posthumously in 1982. Her works have been translated into English, German, Italian and Russian language.

== Literary works (selected) ==
- 1940: Sakura no kuni
- 1945: Katei no yō na hikari
- 1948: City of Corpses (Shikabane no machi)
- 1951: Ningen ranru
- 1953: Fireflies (Hotaru)
- 1954: Han ningen
- 1954: Residues of Squalor (Zanshū tenten)

== Bibliography ==
- Ōta, Yōko (1982). Ōta Yōko Shū. Tokyo: San'ichi Shobō.
- Ōta, Yōko (1985). "Fireflies". In Ōe, Kenzaburō (ed.). The Crazy Iris and Other Stories of the Atomic Aftermath. New York: Grove Press. ISBN 978-0394549446.
- Ōta, Yōko (2007). "Fireflies". In Rimer, J. Thomas; Gessel, Van C. (eds.). The Columbia Anthology of Modern Japanese Literature. Volume 1: From Restoration to Occupation, 1868-1945. Columbia University Press. ISBN 978-0231118606.
- Ōta, Yōko (1990). "City of Corpses". In Minear, Richard H. (ed.). Hiroshima: Three Witnesses. Princeton University Press. ISBN 978-0691055732.
- Ōta, Yōko (1991). "Residues of Squalor". In Lippit, Noriko Mizuta; Selden, Kyoko Iriye (eds.). Japanese Women Writers: Twentieth Century Short Fiction. New York: M. E. Sharpe. ISBN 978-0873328609.
