= Bungeishunjū =

Japanese publishing company

Bungeishunjū Ltd.

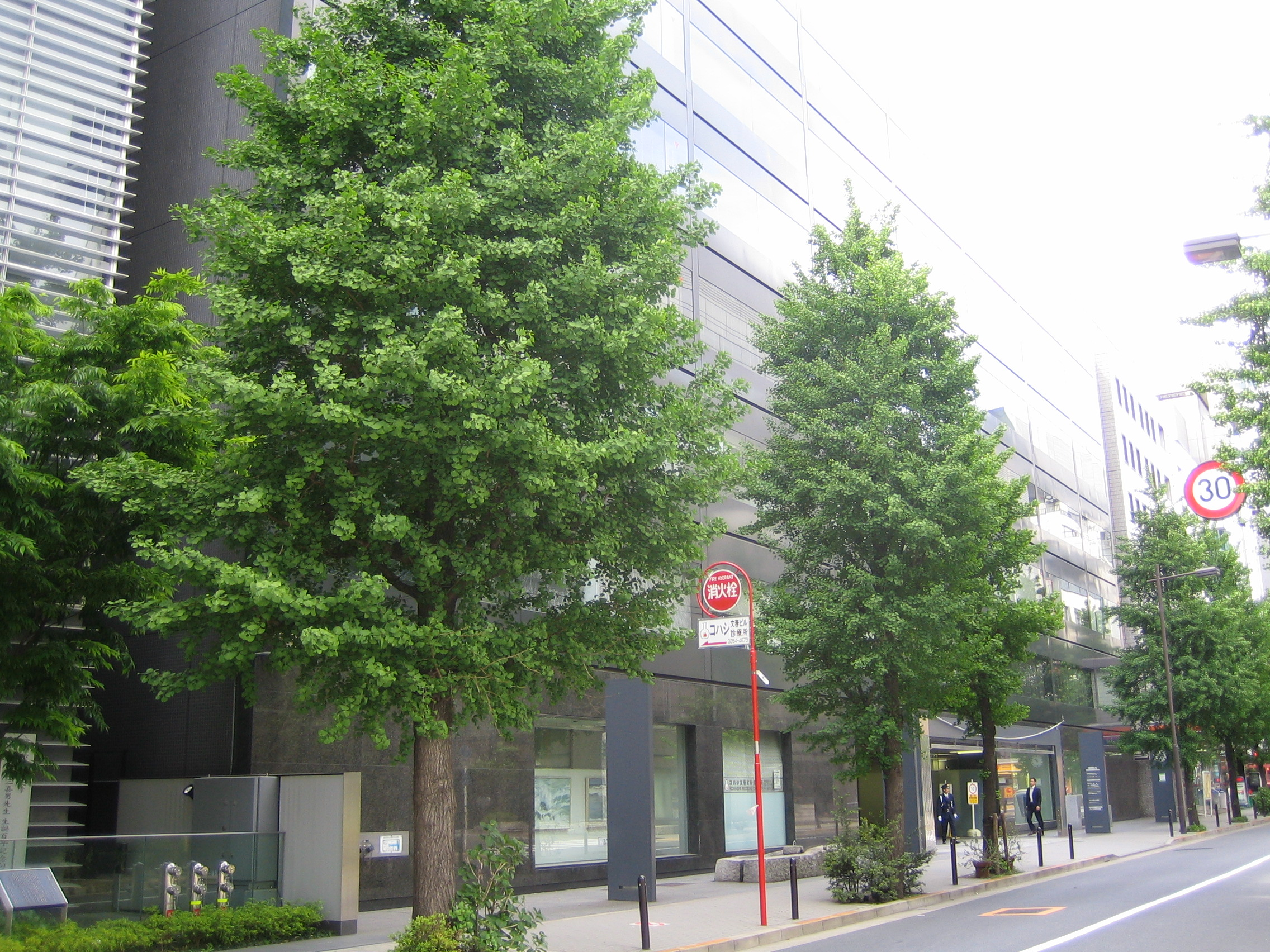
- Headquarters in Chiyoda, Tokyo
- Native name: 株式会社文藝春秋
- Romanized name: Kabushiki-gaisha Bungeishunjū
- Type: Private
- Industry: Publishing
- Founded: 1923; 103 years ago
- Founder: Kan Kikuchi
- Headquarters: Kioichō, Chiyoda, Tokyo, Japan
- Key people: Nariyuki Iikubo (president)
- Products: magazines and other publications
- Number of employees: 366 (July 2009)
- Website: www.bunshun.co.jp

Bungeishunjū Ltd. (株式会社文藝春秋, Kabushiki-gaisha Bungeishunjū) is a Japanese publishing company known for its leading monthly magazine Bungeishunjū. Founded by Kan Kikuchi in 1923, the company is headquartered in Chiyoda, Tokyo.

It grants the annual Akutagawa Prize, one of the most prestigious literary awards in Japan, as well as the annual Naoki Prize for popular novelists. It also granted (from 1955 to 2001) the annual Bungeishunjū Manga Award for achievement in the manga and illustration fields.

The company publishes Bungakukai (文學界), the weekly Shūkan Bunshun (週刊文春), and the sports magazine Number, which represent public opinion of literary, political, and sport-journalistic culture, respectively. The Bunshun, in particular, has come to be known for litigation involving freedom of speech issues, particularly alleged privacy violations and defamation; see, for example, Mitsuo Kagawa.

== History ==
Bungeishunjū was founded in 1923 by writer Kan Kikuchi. The company was disbanded in March 1946 but was reestablished in June of the same year.

In February 1995 the magazine Marco Polo, a 250,000-circulation monthly published by Bungeishunjū, ran a Holocaust denial article by physician Masanori Nishioka which stated:

The "Holocaust" is a fabrication. There were no execution gas chambers in Auschwitz or in any other concentration camp. Today, what are displayed as "gas chambers" at the remains of the Auschwitz camp in Poland are a post-war fabrication by the Polish communist regime or by the Soviet Union, which controlled the country. Not once, neither at Auschwitz nor in any territory controlled by the Germans during the Second World War, was there "mass murder of Jews" in "gas chambers."

The Los Angeles–based Simon Wiesenthal Center instigated a boycott of Bungeishunjū advertisers, including Volkswagen, Mitsubishi, and Cartier. Within days, Bungeishunjū shut down Marco Polo and its editor, Kazuyoshi Hanada, quit, as did the president of Bungeishunjū, Kengo Tanaka.

== List of magazines ==
The magazines published by Bungeishunjū include:

- Bungeishunjū (文藝春秋) (published monthly)
- All Yomimono (オール讀物, Ōru Yomimono) (published monthly)
- Shūkan Bunshun (magazine) (週刊文春) (published weekly)
- Bungakukai (文學界) (monthly literary issue)
- Crea (クレア) (women's quality)
- Shokun! (諸君!) (op-ed magazine)
- Title (タイトル)
- Number (ナンバー)

== Book series ==
The book series published by Bungeishunjū include:

- Bunshun Bunko – a "series of literary works"

== Contributors and editors ==
- Masahiko Katsuya (勝谷誠彦)
- Takashi Tachibana (立花隆)
