= Group TAC =

Former Japanese animation studio (1968–2010)

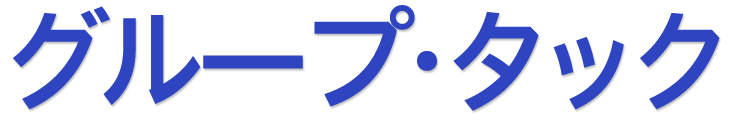

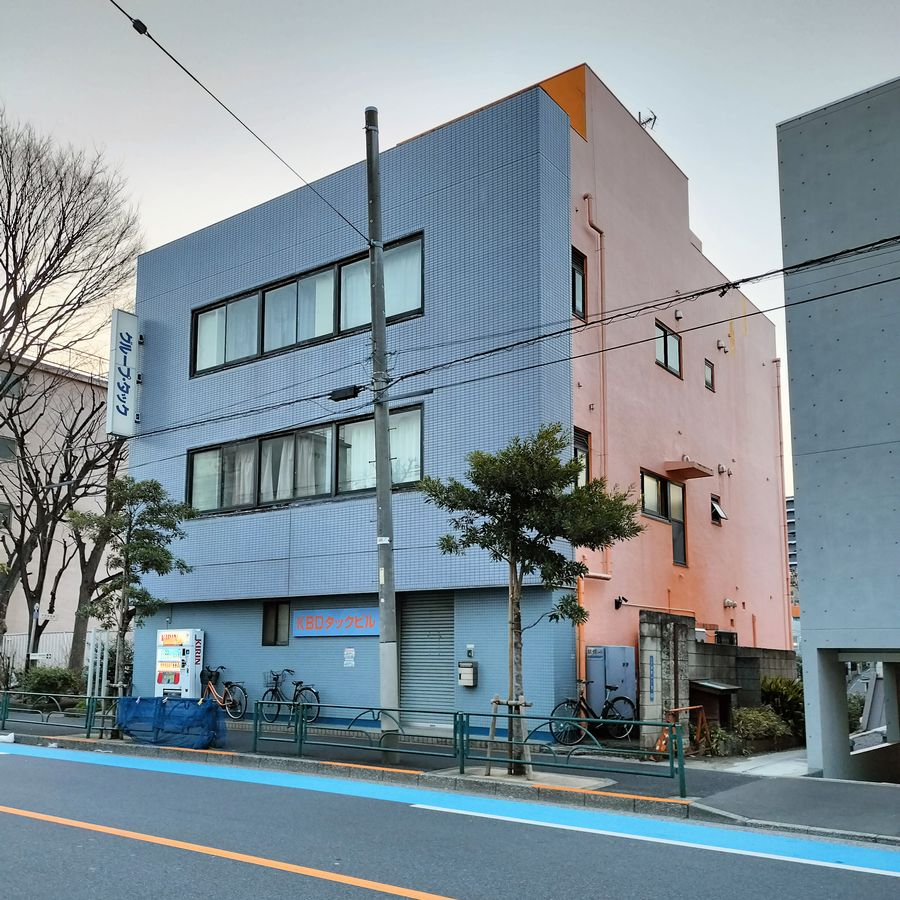
- The former Group TAC office in Shibuya
- Native name: 株式会社グループ・タック
- Romanized name: Kabushiki Kaisha Gurūpu Takku
- Type: Kabushiki-gaisha
- Industry: Anime
- Founded: March 1968; 58 years ago
- Founder: Atsumi Tashiro; Susumu Aketagawa; Gisaburō Sugii; Tomita
- Defunct: August 31, 2010; 16 years ago
- Fate: Bankruptcy liquidation
- Successor: Diomedéa
- Headquarters: Shibuya, Tokyo, Japan
- Subsidiaries: Group TAC Digital Room (2000–2007)
- Website: web.archive.org/web/20070223083159/http://www.g-tac.co.jp/home.html

Group TAC Co., Ltd. (Japanese: 株式会社グループ・タック, Hepburn: Kabushiki Kaisha Gurūpu Takku) was a Japanese animation and computer graphics studio located in Shibuya, Tokyo, and founded in 1968 from former Mushi Pro staff. They worked on movies, videos, TV shows, and commercials, and contributed to all stages of the process, including planning, production, sound effects, and so on. The company was headed by Atsumi Tashiro until his death in July 2010. In September 2010, Group TAC filed for bankruptcy and liquidated all of its assets. Diomedéa was formed after a split from Group TAC. Group TAC's remaining animation project, Hana Kappa, was taken over by OLM, Inc. and XEBEC.

== Projects ==
Year	Title	Notes
1974	Jack and the Beanstalk	
1976	Huckleberry no Bōken	
1978	The Bad News Bears Go to Japan	Main titles of the film
1980	11 Piki no Neko	
1982	Zō no Inai Dōbutsuen	
1982	Two Down Full Base	
1982	Tokimeki Tonight	
1983	Igano Kabamaru	
1983	Nine	
1983	Nine the Original	
1983	Nine 2: Sweetheart Declaration	
1984	Nine 3: Final	
1985	Night on the Galactic Railroad	
1985	Touch	
1986	Touch: Sebangō no Nai Ace	
1986	11 Piki no Neko to Ahōdori	
1987	Hiatari Ryōkō!	
1987	The Foxes of Chironup Island	
1987	The Tale of Genji	
1988	Hiatari Ryōkō! Ka - su - mi: Yume no Naka ni Kimi ga Ita	
1988	Tama and Friends	Produced by Sony Music Entertainment
1990	Everyday is Sunday	
1990	Run! White Wolf	
1990	Nadia: The Secret of Blue Water	With Gainax and Sei Young Animation
1991	Huckleberry no Bōken Movie	
1992	Princess Army	
1992	Yadamon	
1992	Nozomi Witches	
1993	Jungle King Tar-chan	
1993	Tama of 3rd Street: Please! Search for Momo-chan!!	
1993	Bonobono	
1994	Street Fighter II: The Animated Movie	
1994	Gakkō no Kowai Uwasa: Hanako-san ga Kita!!	
1995	Princess Minerva	
1995	Street Fighter II MOVIE (video game)	Original animated sequences
1995	Street Fighter II V	
1995	Soar High! Isami	
1996	Those Who Hunt Elves	
1996	Spring and Chaos	
1996	YAT Anshin! Uchū Ryokō	
1996	Get Going! Godzilland	With Gakken Video & Toho
1996	Road Rovers	With Warner Bros. Animation
1997	Those Who Hunt Elves II	
1997	Hare Tokidoki Buta	With SPE Visual Works
1997	Strange Love	
1998	Super Doll Licca-chan	
1998	Flint the Time Detective	
1998	Touch: Miss Lonely Yesterday	
1998	Monkey Magic	
1998	Superman: the Animated Series	A few episodes with Warner Bros. Animation
1999	Legend of Himiko	
1999	Ippatsu Kiki Musume	
1999	Street Fighter Alpha: The Animation	
1999	Kyorochan	
1999	Koume-chan ga Iku!	
2000	Miami Guns	
2000	Grandeek	
2001	Grappler Baki	
2001	Grappler Baki 2	
2001	Gyōten Ningen Batseelor	
2001	Sanrio Anime World Masterpiece Theater	Produced by Sanrio
2001	Daichis: Earth's Defense Family	
2001	Fighting Foodons	
2001	Princess Comet	With Nippon Animation
2001	Captain Tsubasa: Road to 2002	
2003	Blame!	
2003	Twin Spica	
2003	Gilgamesh	With Japan Vistec and Ishimori Productions
2003	Submarine 707R	
2003	The Golden Laws	With Happy Science
2004	Demonbane	
2004	Area 88 TV	
2004	Grenadier	
2004	Alice Academy	
2004	Viewtiful Joe	
2004	Nanami-chan	
2005	Arashi no Yoru ni	
2005	Viewtiful Joe: Red Hot Rumble	Contributed with the animated cutscenes.
2006	Nanami-chan 2nd Series	
2006	Tokko	With AIC Spirits
2006	Shinigami no Ballad	
2006	Hanbun no Tsuki ga Noboru Sora	
2006	Black Blood Brothers	
2006	Kage Kara Mamoru!	
2006	Nanami-chan 3rd Series	
2007	Tetsuko no Tabi	
2007	Happy Happy Clover	
2008	His Wish and Light	
2008	Shinran-sama: Negai, Soshite Hikari	
2009	The Rebirth of Buddha	
2010	Hana Kappa	
2010	Hutch the Honeybee	With Tatsunoko Productions
