= Hiroshi Masumura =

Japanese manga artist (born 1952)

- ますむら ひろし
- Born: October 23, 1952 (age 73); Yonezawa, Yamagata prefecture
- Occupation: Manga artist
- Years active: 1973–present
- Notable work: Atagoul; Night on the Galactic Railroad (film)

Hiroshi Masumura (Japanese: ますむらひろし, Hepburn: Masumura Hiroshi; born October 23, 1952) is a Japanese manga artist. He is best known for his adaptations of Kenji Miyazawa's children novels, including his work on the anime film Night on the Galactic Railroad (1985), and for several manga series set in the fantasy universe Atagoul. Several of his manga feature anthropomorphic cats as protagonists.

== Career ==
Masumura started his career in 1973 at the age of 21, when he was the runner-up in the 5th Tezuka Award and subsequently got to publish his debut work Kiri ni musebu yoru in Weekly Shōnen Jump, still using the kanji version of his name (増村博) rather than the hiragana one he would subsequently use. In 1975, he published a few short stories in the alternative manga magazine Garo, which were his first stories set in the Atagoul universe. The series Atagoul Monogatari started 1976 in the manga magazine Manga Shōnen and became the first of several spin-off series that he drew for different magazines until 2011. Over 6 million copies of books within the Atagoul universe were sold as of 2007.

Starting from 1983, Masumura has adapted several stories by Kenji Miyazawa into manga. In 1983 alone, he released adaptations of Night on the Galactic Railroad, Gauche the Cellist, Kaze no Matasaburo and The Life of Budori Gusuko. Night on the Galactic Railroad was adapted into a successful anime film in 1985 under the direction of Gisaburō Sugii.

== Themes and influences ==
Many of Masumura's manga feature anthropomorphic cats and humans living together in the utopian fantasy land "Atagoul" on the continent "Yonezaad", which spans fantastic landscapes made up of minerals and megasized plants. The most famous character is the humorous cat Hideyoshi, the protagonist of Atagoul. The idea of cats and humans living at equal terms derives from Miyazawa's short story The Acorns and Wildcat. Masumura explained in an interview why he often chooses cats as characters over humans: "The second you set down a human face to this story, it changes the feeling of the story entirely, defining it around your own image, and I wanted to avoid that."

The world-building of Atagoul is influenced by Kenji Miyazawa's fantasy world of Itahov, which he could relate to on an emotional level. Like Miyazawa, Masumura uses neologisms in order to create a feeling of mystery. Masanao Amano describes Masumura's worldbuilding like this: "When reading the manga we become aware of sounds that are usually forgotten, such as little sounds in the dead of the night, sounds of nature, or the sound of the wind."

Masumura is counted as one of the artists of the New Wave in manga in the late 1970s and 1980s, which highlighted artists that transcended the traditional gendered categories of shōjo manga and shōnen manga.

== Legacy and awards ==
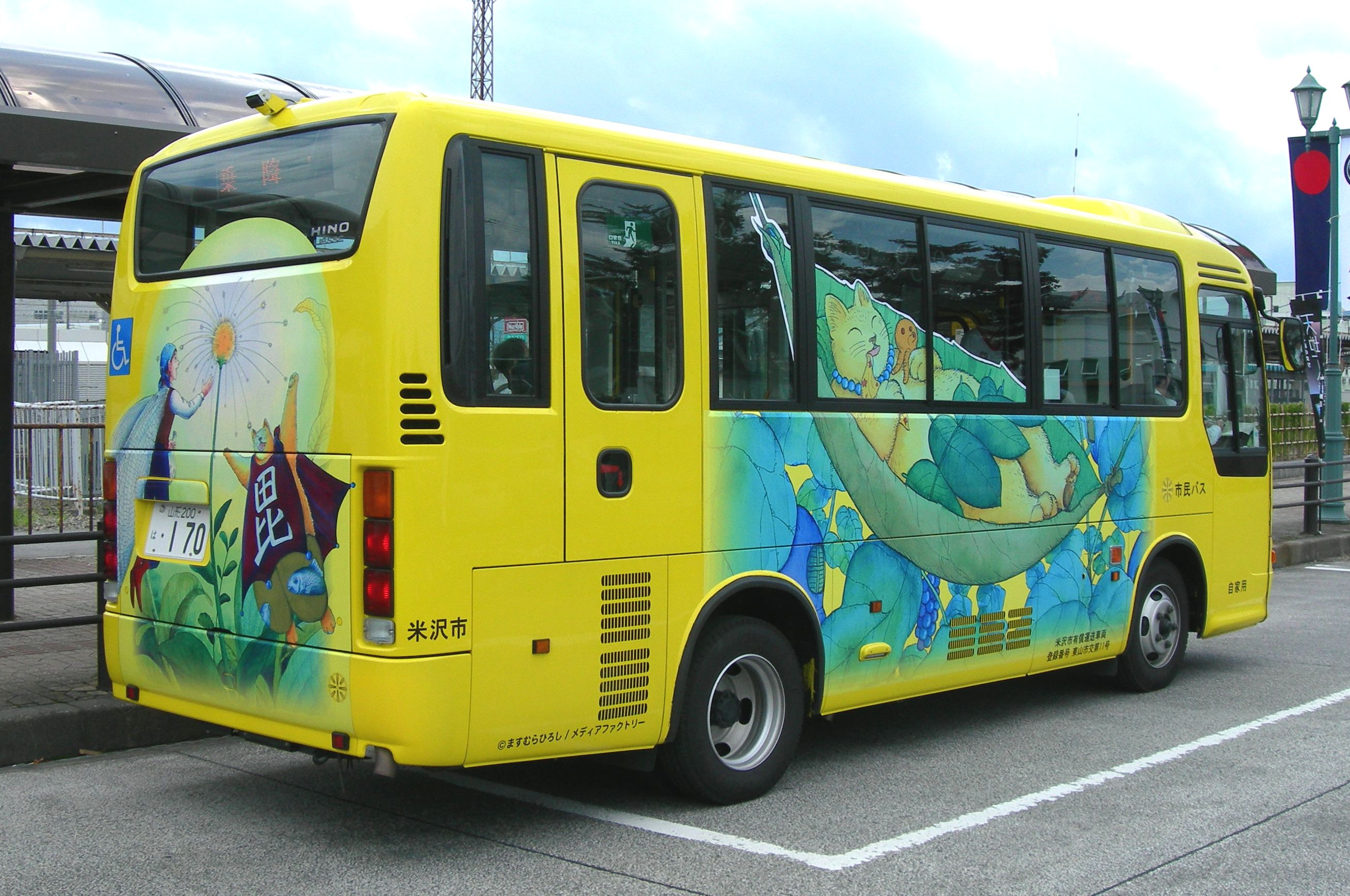
Yonezawa public bus featuring characters from Atagoul in 2009

His work has been exhibited several times in art museums in Japan, among them solo exhibitions at Hachiōji Yume Art Museum in Tokyo in 2007, Sumida Hokusai Museum in 2018, Yamagata Museum of Art in his home province in 2022 and Hachioji Yume Art Museum in 2023. A public transport bus in his hometown of Yonezawa features characters from Atagoul.

After the popularity of the 1985 adaptation of Night on the Galactic Railroad, other anime films based on Miyazawa's work also used character design inspired by Masumura, like Spring and Chaos (1996, directed by Shōji Kawamori) and The Life of Budori Gusuko (2012, also directed by Gisaburō Sugii). Atagoul was adapted into an CG-animated short released in 2004.

His manga have not been translated into English. However, the first four volumes of Atagoul wa Neko no Mori have been translated into French in 2015.

Besides the Tezuka Award in 1973, Masumura received the following awards:

- Japan Cartoonists Association Award 1997: Grand Prize for Atagoul Tamatebako
- Itahov Prize 2001

== Works ==
=== Serializations ===
Start	End	English/Hepburn title	Original title	Publisher
1975	1975	Yonezaad Monogatari	ヨネザアド物語	Seirindō (Garo)
1976	1981	Atagoul Monogatari	アタゴオル物語	Asahi Sonorama (Manga Shōnen)
1981	1982	Jungle Boogie	ジャングル・ブギ	Asahi Sonorama (Duo)
1983	1983	Night on the Galactic Railroad	銀河鉄道の夜 (Ginga Tetsudō no Yoru)	Asahi Sonorama
1983	1983	Kaze no Matasaburō	風の又三郎	Asahi Sonorama
1983	1983	Serohiki no Goshu	セロ弾きのゴーシュ	Asahi Sonorama
1983	1983	Gusukō Budori no Denki	グスコーブドリの伝記	Asahi Sonorama
1984	1994	Atagoul Tamatebako	アタゴオル玉手箱	Kaseisha (Comic Moe / Comic Fantasy)
1985	1985	Rabbit Town	ラビットタウン	Asahi Sonorama
1986	1989	Cosmos Rakuenki	コスモス楽園記	Scholar (Comic Burger)
1988	1988	Pengin Sōshi	ペンギン草紙	Kaseisha (Comic Moe)
1989	1999	Yume furu Rabit Town	夢降るラビット・タウン	Zōshinkai Shuppansha
1991	1993	Jaria	ジャリア	Kaseisha (Kodomo Jigokuhyō)
1991	1993	Enkan Wakusei	円棺惑星	Asahi Sonorama (Nemuki)
1992	1993	Ōrora hōsōkyoku	オーロラ放送局	Gakken (LC Mystery)
1993	1996	Andalucia hime	アンダルシア姫	Gakken (LC Mystery)
1994	1996	Atagoul	アタゴオル	Scholar (Comic Burger)
1997	1999	Girudoma	ギルドマ	Asahi Sonorama (Nemuki)
1999	2011	Atagoul wa Neko no Mori	アタゴオルは猫の森	Media Factory (Comic Flapper)
2002	2002	Wakusei Mimana	惑星ミマナ	Poplar-sha

=== One-shots ===
Year	Hepburn title	Original title	Publisher
1973	Kiri ni musebu yoru	霧にむせぶ夜}	Weekly Shōnen Jump
1978	Eien naru hitomi no mure	永遠なる瞳の群れ	Manga Shōnen
