= Hiatari Ryōkō! =

Manga and anime series by Mitsuru Adachi

- Cover from DVD release of Hiatari Ryōkō! anime

陽あたり良好!
- Manga
- Written by: Mitsuru Adachi
- Published by: Shogakukan
- Magazine: Shōjo Comic
- Original run: December 1979 – 1981
- Volumes: 5
- Television drama
- Original network: NTV
- Original run: March 21, 1982 – September 19, 1982
- Episodes: 19
- Anime television series
- Directed by: Gisaburō Sugii (Note: Chief Director (総監督)); Hiroko Tokita (Note: Series Director (シリーズ監督))
- Produced by: Masamichi Fujiwara; Takashi Ishihara; Chihiro Kameyama; Yoshinobu Nakao; Shigeji Tsuiki
- Written by: Hiroshi Nagano; Satoshi Namiki
- Music by: Hiroaki Serizawa
- Studio: Group TAC
- Original network: Fuji TV
- Original run: March 22, 1987 – March 20, 1988
- Episodes: 48
- Anime film

Hiatari Ryōkō! Ka - su - mi: Yume no Naka ni Kimi ga Ita
- Directed by: Kimiharu Oguma
- Produced by: Hideo Kawano
- Written by: Hiroko Hagita; Hiroko Ogita
- Music by: Kōhei Tanaka
- Studio: Group TAC
- Released: October 1, 1988
- Runtime: 67 minutes

Hiatari Ryōkō! (Japanese: 陽あたり良好!) is a high-school romance manga by Mitsuru Adachi. It was published by Shogakukan in 1979–1981 in the magazine Shōjo Comic and collected in five tankōbon volumes. It was later adapted into a live-action television drama series, an anime television series, and an anime film sequel to the television series. The title translates roughly as Sunlight all around!

== Premise ==
The story focuses on the relationships of Kasumi Kishimoto, a high school student. When she enters Myōjō High School, she moves into her aunt's boarding house, where four boys attending the high school are tenants. Despite her steadfast determination to stay loyal to her boyfriend, who is studying abroad, Kasumi finds herself slowly falling in love with one of the boarders, Yūsaku.

== Characters ==
Kasumi Kishimoto (岸本 かすみ, Kishimoto Kasumi)
Voiced by (anime): Yumi Morio, Played by (live): Sayaka Itō
The main character, and student at Myōjō High School. Because her parents live over an hour away, she decides to stay with her aunt Chigusa who, unbeknownst to Kasumi, has turned her home into a boarding house for four male students at the same high school. After Yūsaku walks in on Kasumi while she takes a bath, she is troubled because she wants to remain faithful to Katsuhiko, her boyfriend. The progress of Kasumi's feelings toward Yūsaku is the central story of the series.
Yūsaku Takasugi (高杉 勇作, Takasugi Yūsaku)
Voiced by (anime): Yūji Mitsuya, Played by (live): Takayuki Takemoto
Tenant in room #3 at Hidamari Private Boarding House. He is in the same class as Kasumi and a member of the ōendan, or cheering squad. He gets inspired by people who work hard at something, whether or not they are victorious, and likes to support them. Yūsaku eventually joins the Myōjō High School baseball team, playing center fielder, despite not knowing how to play the game. He has a cat, Taisuke, which he finds in a box at the side of the road.
Takashi Ariyama (有山 高志, Ariyama Takashi)
Voiced by (anime): Kobuhei Hayashiya
Tenant in room #2 at Hidamari Private Boarding House. He is the goalkeeper for the soccer team until Yūsaku convinces him to join the baseball team as its catcher, so that Masato can throw at his full strength as pitcher. He has a crush on Keiko, though she just considers him a friend. He's always hungry, but a very generous person, who is willing to help out just about anyone.
Shin Mikimoto (美樹本 伸, Mikimoto Shin)
Voiced by (anime): Kaneto Shiozawa
Tenant in room #4 at Hidamari Private Boarding House. Shin is a ladies man and perverted. He is madly in love with Keiko, though she can't stand him. Shin plays third baseman on the Myōjō High School baseball team. He has a telescope, ostensibly for observing the stars, though more often uses it to peep at neighborhood females. Shin is deathly afraid of cats.
Makoto Aido (相戸 誠, Aido Makoto)
Voiced by (anime): Katsuhiro Nanba
Tenant in room #1 at the Hidamari Private Boarding House. He plays only a small role in the series, being mostly used for humorous effect; however, one episode of the live drama series, where his name is changed to Makoto Nakaoka (中岡 誠, Nakaoka Makoto), focuses on him as a medical studies prodigy.
Chigusa Mizusawa (水沢 千草, Mizusawa Chigusa)
Voiced by (anime): Kazue Komiya, Played by (live): Midori Kiuchi
Kasumi's widowed aunt, landlady of the Hidamari Private Boarding House.
Katsuhiko Muraki (村木 克彦, Muraki Katsuhiko)
Voiced by (anime): Kazuhiko Inoue
Kasumi's boyfriend and her aunt Chigusa's late husband's brother's son. His father works in California and he is attending UCLA there, though he returns to Japan once during the series.
Keiko Seki (関 圭子, Seki Keiko)
Voiced by (anime): Hiromi Tsuru
A manager of the Myōjō High School baseball team. She is very reserved and has a crush on Yūsaku.
Masato Seki (関 真人, Seki Masato)
Voiced by (anime): Hirotaka Suzuoki
Keiko's older brother and Myōjō High School's ace pitcher. His goal is to make it to Kōshien before he graduates.
Taisuke (退助)
Voiced by (anime): Eriko Chihara
Yūsaku's pet cat. Because Yūsaku paid ¥100 for him, he was named after Itagaki Taisuke, the man found on the ¥100 banknote.
Maria Ōta (太田まりあ, Ōta Maria)
Voiced by (anime): Miina Tominaga
Only appearing for a short period of time, she and her father Sakamoto move into the boarding house. While there the boys are infatuated with her, but she likes Yūsaku Takasugi. Kasumi is jealous of her.
Shinichirō Ōta (Ōta Shinichirō)
Voiced by (anime): Shigeru Chiba
The widowed father of Maria Ota. He is attractive, which is why Aunt Chigusa allows them to move in.
Sakamoto (坂本)
Voiced by (anime): Hideyuki Tanaka

== Live-action drama ==
The live-action TV drama series ran on NTV from 1982-03-21 through 1982-09-19, for a total of 19 one-hour episodes. The role of Kasumi Kishimoto was at first scheduled to be played by Minako Sawamura, but due to trouble during the shooting of the first episode, the role was given to Sayaka Itō and principal photography with Itō began the following day. The theories as to why Sawamura left include a refusal to do a bath scene and possible schedule conflicts with another show on which she was appearing.

Competing against it in the same time slot were two popular shows: NHK's Taiga drama Tōge no Gunzō and TV Asahi's drama Seibu Keisatsu Part II. Due to this kind of competition, the ratings were not very high for Hiatari Ryōkō!. As this was Adachi's first work adapted for TV, this was disappointing. In the 8pm Sunday time slot, NTV traditionally ran a school drama of some sort, but after the disappointing ratings for Hiatari Ryōkō!, they switched to variety programs in the vein of Kume Hiroshi no TV Scramble and Tensai Takeshi no Tenki ga Deru Terebi!!.

=== Staff ===
- Planning: Bin Yoshikawa (Nippon Television), Etsuo Yamamoto (Toho)
- Screenplay: Yutaka Kaneko, Chigusa Shiota, Hiroshi Kashiwara, Shoji Imai, Toshio Okumura, Setuo Hara, Kanji Kawai
- Directors: Ryo Kinoshita, Kazuhira Suzuki, Tetsutaro Hagiwara
- Producers: Toru Horikoshi (Nippon Television), Kazu Takeda (Toho)
- Original Story: Mitsuru Adachi (based on Shogakukan's "Weekly Shonen Comic")
- Planning Cooperation: Kitty Film
- Music: Asei Kobayashi, Masahisa Takeichi
- Photography: Fumio Tajima and Kenichiro Koizumi
- Art Director: by Yoshio Saito
- Sound Recording: Hiroshi Oba
- Editor: Kiyoshi Kamishima
- Associate Producer: Mitsuru Toriumi
- Location Support: Tokyo Polytechnic University and Imaihama Tokyu Hotel
- Studio: Toho Built
- Sound Editing and Music Selection: Toho Eizo Sound Studio
- Effects: Toyo Onkyo and Toho Effect Group
- Film Development: Toyo Development Laboratory
- Props: Takatsu Decorative Arts
- Costumes: Kyoto Costume Design
- Vehicles: Kanto Lighting Rockeries
- Production by Toho Co., Ltd.

=== Theme song ===
The theme song for the live-action drama series was "You're the Best" (とっておきの君, Totteoki no Kimi), sung by Takayuki Takemoto. The song was produced by CBS/Sony.

=== Video releases ===
A DVD box set containing the full series was released by VAP on 2006-02-22.

== Anime ==
Hiatari Ryōkō completed its serialization in 1981 with five volumes. However, the television anime adaptation of Adachi's later manga, Touch, became a hit which made it possible for the series to get adapted even after completion. Virtually all of Touch's staff, such as series director Gisaburō Sugii and composer Hiroaki Serizawa, moved to Hiatari Ryōkō as soon as Touch's production concluded. Much of Touch's voice cast was in this anime as well, excluding Noriko Hidaka (Minami Asakura in Touch). It seamlessly replaced Touch, which ran for two years in the same timeslot. The anime television series consisted of 48 half-hour episodes made for Fuji TV, airing from March 22, 1987, to March 20, 1988. It was followed by theatrical anime movie, which served as an alternative version, titled What a Sunny Day! Ka - su - mi: You Were in My Dreams (陽あたり良好! KA・SU・MI 夢の中に君がいた, Hiatari Ryōkō! Ka - su - mi: Yume no Naka ni Kimi ga Ita). The movie ran as a double feature with the first Kimagure Orange Road film and included all three of Kimagure's opening theme songs as background music.

=== Staff ===
- Director: Kimiharu Oguma
- Supervising Editor: Gisaburo Sugii
- Screenplay: Satoshi Namiki, Hiroko Hagita
- Original Story: Mitsuru Adachi
- Producers: Masamichi Fujiwara, Shigeji Taiki
- Animation Director: Minoru Maeda
- Director of Photography: Shigeo Sugimura
- Art Director: Katsuyoshi Kanemura
- Music: Kohei Tanaka
- Music Producer: Tatsuo Ohba
- Sound Recording: Toshiaki Hoshino
- Editor: Masashi Furukawa

=== Theme songs ===
There were three opening and three ending theme songs throughout the course of the anime television series.

==== Opening ====
"Sunshine All Around!" (陽あたり良好!, Hiatari Ryōkō!)
Vocals by Aki Asakura, episodes 1–17
"Corner Homecoming" (帰って来た街角, Kaettekita Machikado)
Vocals by Hiroaki Serizawa, episodes 18–37
"Sorrow is Changing the Beat" (悲しみはBEATに変えて, Kanashimi wa Bīto ni Kaete)
Vocals by Ami Ozaki, episodes 38–48

==== Ending ====
"Scolding Maria" (舌打ちのマリア, Shitauchi no Maria)
Vocals by Yumekojo, episodes 1–17
"Knife Edge Summer" (ナイフの上の夏, Naifu no Ue no Natsu)
Vocals by Hiroaki Serizawa, episodes 18–37
"Don't Make Me Count Sheep Around the World" (世界中の羊数えさせないで, Sekaijū no Hitsuji Kazoesasenaide)
Vocals by Ami Ozaki, episodes 38–48

=== Video releases ===
The anime series has been released on LD by Toho, and a DVD box set was released in January 2006. The anime movie has been released on VHS and LD by Toho but not DVD.

A high-definition remastered version was sent to Japanese streaming services such as AbemaTV in 2018.
