= Hoshi Meguri no Uta =

Japanese children's song

Hoshi Meguri no Uta (星巡りの歌; lit. 'Song of the Pilgrimage of the Stars') is a piece of music composed in the pentatonic scale by Kenji Miyazawa in 1918. It was notated by Fujiwara Katōji. It is featured in his 1934 novel Night on the Galactic Railroad as well as its 1985 animated adaptation, where it appears in a music box arrangement by Shimizu Osamu and Haruomi Hosono. Its name in Esperanto is La Kanto de la Rondiro de la Steloj.

== Score and translated lyrics ==
The red-eyed Scorpion,
and the Eagle's spread wings
The blue-eyed Little Dog,
and the coiled Snake of Light
Orion sings in the heavens
From where fall dew and frost

The cloud of Andromeda
in the shape of a fish's mouth,
and the Great Bear
who reaches out five times to the North
to the brow of the Little Bear,
where shines the guide of the pilgrimage of the sky

== Summary ==
The lyrics are full of fantastic images of the night sky, although in some places they differ from the usual interpretation of the constellations. The "red eye" of the Scorpion mentioned in the song is Antares, heart of the constellation Scorpius, and the "blue eye" of Canis Minor is Procyon. The "guide of the pilgrimage of the sky" on the brow of Ursa Minor is thought to refer to Polaris, which is actually at the end of that constellation's tail.

Hoshi meguri no uta received renewed notoriety when it was sung by Ōtake Shinobu and the Suginami Children's Chorus in the course of the closing ceremonies of the 2020 Summer Olympics in Tokyo. It has also been used in the 2004 visual novel and 2016 anime Planetarian: The Reverie of a Little Planet, and in the 2026 anime film Shiboyugi: Playing Death Games to Put Food on the Table – 44: Cloudy Beach.

== See also ==
- Musica universalis
