= Nanami-chan =

Japanese anime television series

ななみちゃん
- Genre: Comedy, Fantasy, Slice of life story
- Anime television series
- Directed by: Tatsutoshi Nomura
- Studio: Group TAC and Robot Communications
- Original network: NHK
- Original run: 2004 – 2009
- Episodes: 76

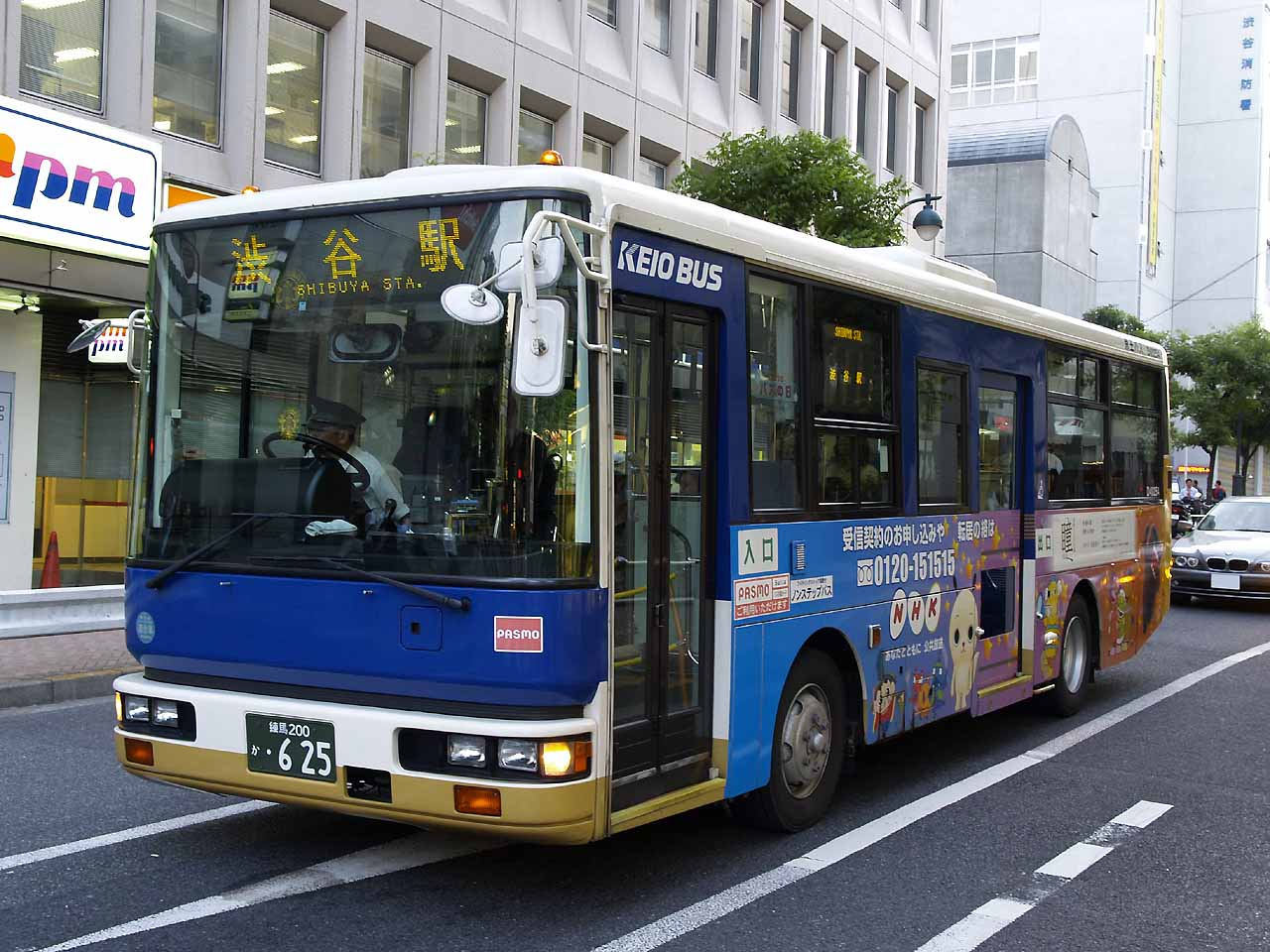
Fleet of Keio Bus Higashi, operated as NHK "Studio Park" shuttle bus.

Nanami-chan (ななみちゃん) is an anime series that runs in 5 minute segments. As of February 2009, 76 of Nanami-chan's episodes have been broadcast on NHK since 2004.

== Characters ==
- Nanami (ななみ) Voiced by: Etsuko Kozakura
- Aoba Michi (青葉未知) Voiced by: Yumi Kakazu
