= Night on the Galactic Railroad =

1927 novel by Kenji Miyazawa

- Author: Kenji Miyazawa
- Original title: 銀河鉄道の夜
- Translator: Roger Pulvers, Sarah Strong, John Bester, Joseph Sigrist
- Language: Japanese
- Genre: Children's literature, fantasy, philosophical novel
- Publisher: Bunpodō
- Publication date: October 1934
- Publication place: Japan

Night on the Galactic Railroad (銀河鉄道の夜, Ginga Tetsudō no Yoru), sometimes translated as Milky Way Railroad, Night Train to the Stars or Fantasy Railroad in the Stars, is a Japanese fantasy novel by Kenji Miyazawa written around 1927. The nine-chapter novel was posthumously published by Bunpodō (文圃堂) in 1934 as part of Complete Works of Kenji Miyazawa Vol. 3 (『宮沢賢治全集』第三巻). Four versions are known to be in existence, with the last one being the most famous among Japanese readers.

The novel was adapted as a 1985 anime film as well as various comics, stage musicals and plays.

== Plot summary ==
Giovanni is a lonely boy whose mother is bedridden with illness and whose father is said to be either away on a long fishing trip or serving a prison sentence. Giovanni does odd jobs after school such as helping the typesetter at the printers in order to buy food; his sister also contributes. His classmates regularly ridicule him for having once said his father will return soon and bring him an otter-skin coat.

During a science lesson, the teacher asks the class what the Milky Way is made of. Having read about this at the house of Campanella, his only friend, Giovanni knows it is composed of stars, but is too timid to say so. When called upon, Campanella also does not answer, to save Giovanni from embarrassment.

In the evening, the others prepare to attend the festival of stars. Giovanni hears that they did not receive their milk delivery that day, and heads to the dairy to fetch it for his mother. The elderly woman there tells him to try again later.

Giovanni runs into his classmates, who mock him again. He sees Campanella in the group, and Campanella gives him sympathetic looks. Giovanni goes alone to the top of a nearby hill and lies at the base of a "weather wheel" (天気輪). As he gazes up at the Milky Way above, Giovanni finds himself with Campanella on board a steam train. The train travels past the Northern Cross and other stars across the galaxy, making several stops. A ticket inspector comes by at one point, and Campanella and the others show their tickets while Giovanni offers the piece of paper he finds in his pocket. They learn that it's a rare ticket that allows the holder to go anywhere with the train. The two boys witness amazing sights and meet various people, including scholars excavating a fossil from sands of white crystal, a man who catches herons and sells them as sweets, and passengers of the Titanic. A child recounts the story behind Scorpio: a scorpion who preys on insects flees from a weasel and, after falling down a well, regrets not having sacrificed itself to feed the weasel, a good cause. It vowed to serve others in its next life, and its body burst into flames that still burn in the night sky.

When the train stops at the Southern Cross, the remaining passengers disembark (for the Christian heaven), leaving only Giovanni and Campanella. Giovanni says that they should travel together forever, and vows to follow Scorpio's example of bringing happiness to others. However, as the train approaches Coalsack, a black hole, Campanella sees his mother waiting for him in a meadow (in the "true heaven" of his faith) that Giovanni is unable to see. Campanella vanishes from the train, leaving Giovanni weeping in despair.

Giovanni wakes up back on the hilltop in tears. He returns to the dairy and collects the milk. As he passes the area from which his classmates set out earlier, he sees a crowd. They tell him that one of the boys fell from the boat into the river and that Campanella had jumped in to save him. Giovanni speaks to Campanella's father, who says his son has been lost in the water too long to be saved. He says that he's received a letter from his friend, Giovanni's father, announcing his return home. Giovanni heads home to deliver this news and the milk to his mother.

== Major themes ==
After Miyazawa's most beloved sister Toshi died in 1922, Miyazawa, in sorrow, went on a railroad trip to Karafuto. He started working on this novel soon afterward in 1924, and this trip is said to be the basis of the story. He kept on polishing the work steadily until his death in 1933. The middle part of the novel was never completed but was published as it is nevertheless.

A tribute to those who give themselves to others is a recurring theme throughout the storyline, and according to Hasebe (2000), they are reflections of Miyazawa's philosophy of self-sacrifice, a view appearing in many other juvenile novels of his such as Yodaka no Hoshi and Guskō Budori no Denki. Meanwhile, Suzuki (2004) interprets them as representing a "holistic thought of Ecosystem".

== Adaptations ==
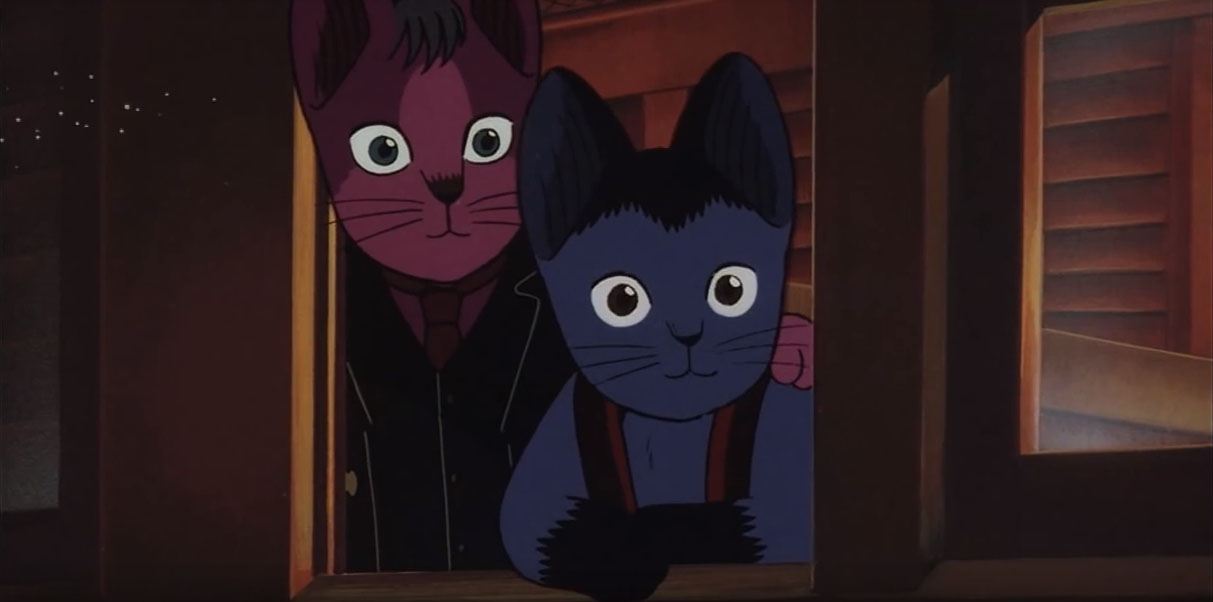
Night on the Galactic Railroad, 1985 anime with protagonists depicted as cats

=== Manga and anime ===
Hiroshi Masumura released a manga adaptation of the novel in 1983 with Asahi Sonorama. The protagonists in the manga are anthropomorphic cats. The manga then was made into a 1985 anime film directed by Gisaburo Sugii based on a screenplay by Minoru Betsuyaku. It was released on July 13, 1985, and features Mayumi Tanaka as Giovanni and Chika Sakamoto as Campanella.

=== Stage adaptations ===
Playwright Sō Kitamura made the story into a drama titled Sōkō: Night on the Galactic Railroad (想稿・銀河鉄道の夜). Note that 想稿 could be a play on the word sōkō (草稿; "rough draft") and the character 想 (sō) carrying meanings such as "conception" or "idea". Premièred in 1986, the play was performed by Kitamura's theatrical company Project Navi.

A part in a 2002 play consisting of various works by Kenji, The Account of Kenji Island Exploration (賢治島探検記, Kenji-tō Tankenki), written by Yutaka Narui for a theatrical company Caramelbox, features the story by the name of Night on the Light Speed Galactic Railroad (光速銀河鉄道の夜, Kōsoku Ginga Tetsudō no Yoru). It follows through the episodes in the novel rather briefly. The play also includes some lines by Professor Burukaniro, which appear only in the first three versions of the novel.

Warabiza, a performing arts company in Akita Prefecture, made a musical version of the story. The musical premièred in April 2004 and toured around Japan until March 2007.

=== Illustrated e-book ===
An illustrated book with music was launched in 2011 as an application for iPad. Using the final fourth draft of Miyazawa's original as the source text, it has 272 pages. Apple Japan has recommended the Japanese version as an educational application.

=== French comic ===
The novel was the basis for the 176 pages long comic album Train de nuit dans la Voie lactée by the Frenchman Adrien Demont. The comic is made with light brown and blue colours. It was published by Morgen on 14 January 2026.

== Allusions in other works ==
- In the Tōhoku region of Japan where Kenji Miyazawa grew up, there is a real-life train line of similar name: Iwate Galaxy Railway Line (いわて銀河鉄道線, Iwate Ginga Tetsudō sen), running from Morioka Station to Metoki Station.
- The idea of a steam locomotive running through the stars inspired Leiji Matsumoto to create his famous manga, Galaxy Express 999 (whose literal Japanese title is Ginga Tetsudō 999, possibly in reference to the Japanese title of the novel).
- In the manga and anime Doraemon, Nobita Nobi once mistook the novel for being Leiji Matsumoto's manga, since both contain "Ginga Tetsudō" in the title.
- In Revolutionary Girl Utena, a character describes how a boy saved her sister from drowning, but ends up drowning himself, an allusion to Campanella. The lyrics of the song "Nanibito mo Kataru Koto Nashi" (何人も語ることなし) that plays during the duel in episode 12 also directly reference the Galactic Railroad.
  - In the movie adaption Adolescence of Utena, the same theme of a child sacrificing themselves to save another from drowning is expanded upon, with the character Touga Kiryuu filling the Campanella role.
- The story inspired Going Steady, a Japanese punk rock band, to create the song "Ginga Tetsudō no Yoru" (銀河鉄道の夜).
- A character in the light novel .hack//AI buster remarks that he took his online handle, Albireo, because he was so affected by Miyazawa's description of the binary star Albireo. The book is referenced once more during a discussion on how much stories can change from the first draft to the final draft, due to the various different versions of Night on the Galactic Railroad.
- With the character of Matamune, the wise ghost of a cat often seen travelling by train in the afterlife and in the real world, manga artist Hiroyuki Takei introduced his own vision of Miyazawa's story in the manga Shaman King. The wise cat is even seen reading the book by Miyazawa in tome 19 (chapter 164).
- This book is also heavily mentioned and referenced in the anime Hanbun no Tsuki ga Noboru Sora (Looking Up at the Half-Moon), as a book that Akiba Rika's father gave to her.
- In the arcade game Star Trigon, Night on the Galactic Railroad is mentioned as the favorite book of Chuta Bigbang. It is also said that he joined the Star Trigon Team with the goal of finding Campanella in space.
- Yakitate!! Japan has a short mention of the work as illustrated in the reaction of the judge Pierrot, the world class clown, after eating the bread of Shadow who promised it would send him across the galaxy to see his mother. It is shown that the characters mother's favorite book is the same piece of literature; she is shown in a painting holding the book. This is only in the anime: in the manga, Pierrot is instead transported to the world of Galaxy Express 999, which was adapted from this work.
- In the manga Aria by Kozue Amano, a human character, Akari, imagines that a nighttime train is the Galaxy Express from the novel. The next night she is given a ticket to ride it by a cat and nearly gets on it but donates the ticket to a kitten. Aside from Akari, the conductor and all the passengers are cats, similar to the movie.
- Daisuke Kashiwa's song "Stella" is program music based on the novel.
- Fantasy Railroad in the Stars (銀河鉄道の夜) by Kagaya Yutaka (DVD, 2007) is screened in planetariums. The DVD features the story of a boy dreaming of travelling by train through the Milky Way, and the story is narrated by the voice actress Kuwashima Houko.
- Hikaru Utada's album Heart Station contains a song, "Take 5", which uses this novel as a basis for the lyrics.
- Vocaloid producer sasakure.UK has a song titled "For Campanella" (sung by GUMI), based after the novel. GUMI supposedly sings from Giovanni's point of view and the song was written "for" Campanella.
- The themes and character's actions of Night on the Galactic Railroad become a major plot point in the anime film Book Girl.
- The 2011 anime Mawaru-Penguindrum makes multiple references to both the book and the anime adaptation throughout, such as the red and blue colors associated with the main characters, the "Scorpion Fire" parable and the apple motif.
- In the otome game Hatoful Boyfriend, and its sequel Holiday Star, the novel has been referred to both in the dialogue of the first game and served as the basis of the main plot in the second.
- Between 2014 and 2023, the railway operator JR East operated a steam-hauled excursion train called the SL Ginga on the Kamaishi Line in the Tohoku region, inspired by the novel.
- Night on the Galactic Railroad is the first play the titular character of the manga Kasane performs in by stealing her friend's face for one night, when she's a high school student. The play and the character's stellar performance as Giovanni will impact future developments and be referenced several times in the story afterwards.
- The story and characters of Giovanni no Shima have a deep connection to the book, referencing it several times to the point where characters are playing scenes of their counterparts in Miyazawa's story. The protagonist's names, Junpei and Kanta, originate from "Giovanni" and "Campanella" respectively.
- Campanella is alluded to in Ryohgo Narita's light novel series Baccano!, in which one of his protagonists in the novels Ironic Light Orchestra and Crack Flag is named Monica Campanella. She also bears a similar fate to the original Campanella.
- The novel is referenced several times in the 2015 film Maku ga Agaru, starring the Japanese idol group Momoiro Clover Z, besides being the main play that make the characters in the film.
- In the eroge Wagamama High Spec, a play based on the book is written and performed by characters of the game.
- In the visual novel A Sky Full of Stars, the book is mentioned in dialogue in relation to a character's eyes (Amanogawa Saya) and the double star Albireo.
- In Shunji Iwai's 2016 film, A Bride for Rip Van Winkle, the book is mentioned by the protagonist as being her favorite when it is shown that her nickname for a social media account is "Campanella".
- In the mobile game Magia Record, a spin-off to the anime Puella Magi Madoka Magica, there are multiple references to the book. For example, the doppels of the main characters Iroha and Yachiyo are named Giovanna and Campanella.
- In the manga Act-Age, the main character, Yonagi Kei, and other secondary characters perform a theatre play version of the story, with Kei as Campanella.
- In the visual novel Wonderful Everyday, an entire scene is a reference to the book.
- Stray Sheep by Kenshi Yonezu contains a song titled "Campanella" named after a character in the novel. The lyrics are from the point of view of Zanelli (one of the bullies) after Campanella sacrifices himself to save him from drowning.
- In episode 5 of the anime adaptation of Karakai Jōzu no Takagi-san (Teasing Master Takagi-san), Takagi is seen reading a copy of the book in the library before helping Nishikata study for a test.
- DJ Unit Lyrical Lily from D4DJ released a song titled "Ginga Tetsudō no Yoru Ni" (銀河鉄道の夜に). The lyrics depict scenes from the novel.
- In the ADV game Needy Girl Overdose (Needy Streamer Overload), one of the endings is a direct reference to the novel. In the 2026 anime adaptation, Ame summarizes the novel to the audience, with the characters of Campanella and Giovanni replaced by KAngel and Purple Lollipop respectively. KAngel is later depicted doing reading streams of Miyazawa's work.

== See also ==
- 1927 in science fiction
- Guskō Budori no Denki

== Notes ==
1. A short pillar with a horizontal prayer wheel set in a slot at the center. These were once installed in Buddhist cemeteries and were ostensibly used for communicating with the spirits of the dead.
