= Spring and Chaos =

1996 animated film

- North American DVD cover art

イーハトーブ幻想 Kenjiの春 (Ihatov Gensou: Kenji no Haru)
- Anime television film
- Directed by: Shōji Kawamori
- Produced by: Hidekazu Satō
- Written by: Shōji Kawamori
- Music by: Shang Shang Typhoon
- Studio: Group TAC
- Original network: NNS
- Released: December 14, 1996
- Runtime: 56 minutes

Spring and Chaos (イーハトーブ幻想 Kenjiの春, Īhatōbu Gensō Kenji no Haru; lit, Ihatov Fantasy: Kenji's Spring) is a 1996 Japanese anime television special inspired by the life of poet Kenji Miyazawa, released in Japan to mark the 100th anniversary of Miyazawa's birth. It was directed by Shoji Kawamori. It was released in North America by Tokyopop. Miyazawa and the other characters in the program are depicted as cats, similar to the anime adaptation of Miyazawa's story Night on the Galactic Railroad.

The North American title Spring and Chaos derives from the title of Miyazawa's poetry collection Spring and Asura (Haru to Shura), the title poem of which is recited in part in the program. The "Ihatov" in the Japanese title is a setting in a number of Miyazawa's works; it is the word Miyazawa created in Esperanto for his place of residence, Japan's Iwate Prefecture.

== Plot ==
The story follows Kenji Miyazawa through different periods of his life, centering primarily on his relationships with his sister, his father, his students, and the farmers in his area. The film opens with a sequence of Kenji carrying snow in his hands and chasing after a moving train containing his sister Toshi. Suddenly the ground splits and the train descends into the sea, as Kenji sinks to his knees and calls his sister's name. In the real world, Kenji's students sit in their classroom and gossip about the strangeness of their teacher. Kenji enters through the window and proceeds to tell the students to shut their books and close their eyes, explaining principles of heat and temperature to them. Then he leads his students on an outdoor excursion, demonstrating the eccentric teaching style that Miyazawa was known for.

Six years earlier, Kenji walks through natural landscapes with his friend, Kanai Hosaka. Looking at two telegraph poles, he gets the inspiration for his poem Telegraph Poles on a Moonlit Night. He talks about his dreams for the future with Kanai on a mountaintop while gazing at a beautiful field of stars. Upon returning home with an armful of rocks he has collected, he witnesses his father at work at the family pawnshop business, in the middle of insisting that he cannot give a poor hunter any more money for his nata hatchet and old clothes. Kenji later argues with his father about the business, decrying the practice of profiting off the poor. However, he is cheered by his sister Toshi; he asks her if she has read his poem in Azalea, a reference to the magazine that Miyazawa started with his friends. Toshi starts to cough violently and Kenji rushes to her aid.

In 1923 Kenji moves to Tokyo out of depression, working at a small publishing out. He meets his friend Kanai again after three years, but Kanai now believes Kenji to be too idealistic, and says that they cannot walk the path they dreamed of together after all. Kenji returns shortly afterwards to Hanamaki to be with Toshi, who is very sick and talks about her fear of death. Kenji reads her a story of his and describes his writing methods and the inspiration he takes from nature. His creative process is depicted in an abstract sequence showing birds, bears, a winged Kenji, and numerous other images in varying art styles.

Kenji's father berates him for printing so many copies of his book, which no one ended up reading. Kenji declares that he doesn't write to sell books. In the classroom his students read his poetry collection Spring and Asura, but they all profess to not understand it. Kenji observes the farmers toiling slavishly in the fields and becomes overcome with emotion, hit with a sudden hallucination of being trapped and surrounded by water filled with skeletal corpses and fearful spirits. He comes to with his students worrying around him. They then tell him about a student who has been stealing from his classmates; Kenji catches the student and tells the boy to follow him, travelling a long way through difficult natural terrain until they reach a mountaintop. There Kenji asks the boy about his motives for stealing, offering selflessly to give the boy his entire salary and to get him however much money he needs. He learns that the young boy is from a poor family of farmers.

Kenji makes up his mind to quit teaching and to work the fields alongside the other farmers. He is unused to the work, and the other farmers scoff at him and view him as a weak amateur. As a sung version of Miyazawa's famous poem Ame ni mo Makezu plays in the background, Kenji works in the field in the day and teaches the farmers about art and literature as well as new fertilizing techniques during the evening. However, many other farmers still do not warm up to him, continuing to think of him as spoiled and rich, even sabotaging his crop while he is away.

He works himself to exhaustion farming and hallucinates once again, leading to a rapid series of flashbacks. He despairs and thinks of one of his last moments with his sister, when she asks him to bring her fresh snow and he feeds it to her in bed. As Kenji lies desolately in the field, all of a sudden a pair of trains burst up from the ground and towards the sky, referencing Miyazawa's novel Night on the Galactic Railroad, the basis for which was said to be his sister's death. Seeing this, he is able to regain hope. He recites a segment of his poem Spring and Asura.

== Reception ==
A review in Anime News Network called it "one of the most beautiful Animes ever created", and it was rated the 80th best Anime Movie of All Time by the same site.
