= Night on the Galactic Railroad (film) =

- 1996 theatrical re-release poster
- Directed by: Gisaburo Sugii
- Screenplay by: Minoru Betsuyaku
- Based on: Night on the Galactic Railroad by Kenji Miyazawa
- Produced by: Atsumi Tashiro; Masato Hara
- Starring: Mayumi Tanaka; Chika Sakamoto
- Cinematography: Nobuo Koyama
- Edited by: Masashi Furukawa
- Music by: Haruomi Hosono
- Production company: Group TAC
- Distributed by: Nippon Herald Films
- Release date: July 13, 1985 (Japan)
- Running time: 113 minutes
- Country: Japan
- Language: Japanese

Night on the Galactic Railroad (銀河鉄道の夜, Ginga Tetsudō no Yoru), also known as Giovanni and Campanella in some markets, is a 1985 Japanese anime film directed by Gisaburo Sugii, based on Hiroshi Masumura's manga adaptation of the 1934 fantasy novel of the same name by Kenji Miyazawa. The film's screenplay was written by Minoru Betsuyaku. Its plot follows a young cat named Giovanni (voiced by Mayumi Tanaka), who journeys on a train with his classmate Campanella (Chika Sakamoto) through the Milky Way galaxy.

Produced independently by the animation studio Group TAC, the film was released by Nippon Herald Films on July 13, 1985. It was awarded the Ōfuji Noburō Award in the same year.

== Plot ==
Giovanni is a young, bluish-colored cat, whose father is away on a fishing trip and whose mother is ill at home. At school, during a lesson about the Milky Way, Giovanni's teacher asks him what the galaxy is composed of. Giovanni knows that it is made of stars, but is unable to say so, and his classmate Campanella does the same to save Giovanni from their fellow schoolmates' teasing. After school, Giovanni works a typesetting job at a print shop, and buys a loaf of bread and some sugar. He returns home to find that no milk was delivered that day, so he heads to the dairy, where he is told by an elderly cat to return at a later time.

That night, the Centaurus Festival, or the Festival of Stars, takes place in the town. Upon reaching the festivities, Giovanni is mocked by his classmates for expecting an otter-skin coat from his father. Giovanni runs to the top of a hill at the edge of town and gazes up at the night sky. A steam train suddenly appears, and Giovanni boards it. On board, he is joined by Campanella, and as the train sets in motion, the two observe fields of flowers outside the windows of their train car. The train travels past the Northern Cross and halts at a stopover, where Giovanni and Campanella disembark. They walk down a flight of steps and are directed by a sign towards "The Pliocene Coast", where they find their teacher leading an excavation of fossils from crystallized sands.

They return to the train, where they meet a bird-catcher who catches herons and turns the birds into candy. Giovanni and Campanella help a blind wireless operator to his radio system. He picks up a transmission which an elderly passenger identifies as the hymn "Nearer, My God, to Thee". When a ticket inspector appears, Giovanni discovers in his pocket a rare ticket which allows him to go anywhere that the train runs. They are then joined in their seats by a tutor and two children, who were on board a ship that sank after hitting an iceberg. They share apples and pass by a vast cornfield where they hear the "New World Symphony".

As the train passes Scorpius, one of the children recalls a story about a scorpion who perished in a well after escaping a weasel; regretting that it did not sacrifice itself for a good cause, the scorpion prayed to bring happiness to others in its next life, and its body burst into a bright flame that still burns in the night sky. The train stops at the Southern Cross, where every passenger except for Giovanni and Campanella disembark for the Christian Heaven. Giovanni pledges that he and Campanella should continue on the train's journey together forever, but as the train approaches the Coalsack, Campanella sees what he claims to be "the true Heaven", where his mother is waiting for him. Campanella vacates the train, leaving Giovanni alone.

Giovanni awakens on the hilltop. He returns to the dairy, where this time he collects a bottle of milk from a farmer. As Giovanni passes through town on his way home, he learns that Campanella fell into a river while saving one of their classmates, Zanelli, from drowning. Giovanni hurries to the river, where he finds Campanella's father giving up searching for his son, as his disappearance occurred 45 minutes prior. He tells Giovanni that he has received a letter from his father, stating that he will be home soon. Giovanni believes Campanella is "at the edge of the universe", which he says he knows "because we explored it together". He vows to be like the scorpion who promised to bring happiness to others, and continues homeward.

== Cast ==
Cast
Character	Japanese	English
Giovanni	Mayumi Tanaka	Veronica Taylor
Campanella	Chika Sakamoto	Crispin Freeman
Zanelli	Junko Hori	Oliver Wyman
Teacher	Ryounosuke Kaneda	Greg Wolfe
Store Owner	Ryuji Saikachi	
Giovanni's Mother	Yoshie Shimamura	Leah Applebaum
Dairy Woman	Reiko Niimura	Rachael Lillis
Bird Catcher	Chikao Ootsuka	Oliver Wyman
Lighthouse Keeper	Fujio Tokita	Eric Stuart
Wireless Operator	Takeshi Aono	David Moo
Young Man	Hidehiro Kikuchi	Sam Riegel (as Gil Ramsee)
Kaoru	Kaori Nakahara	Lisa Ortiz
Tadashi	Yuriko Fuchizaki	Amy Birnbaum
Conductor	Tetsuya Kaji	Scott Cargle
Marceau	Miyuki Ichijo	Rachael Lillis
Campanella's Father	Gorou Naya	Eric Schussler
Dairy Man	Seiji Kurazaki	Scott Rayow

== Production ==
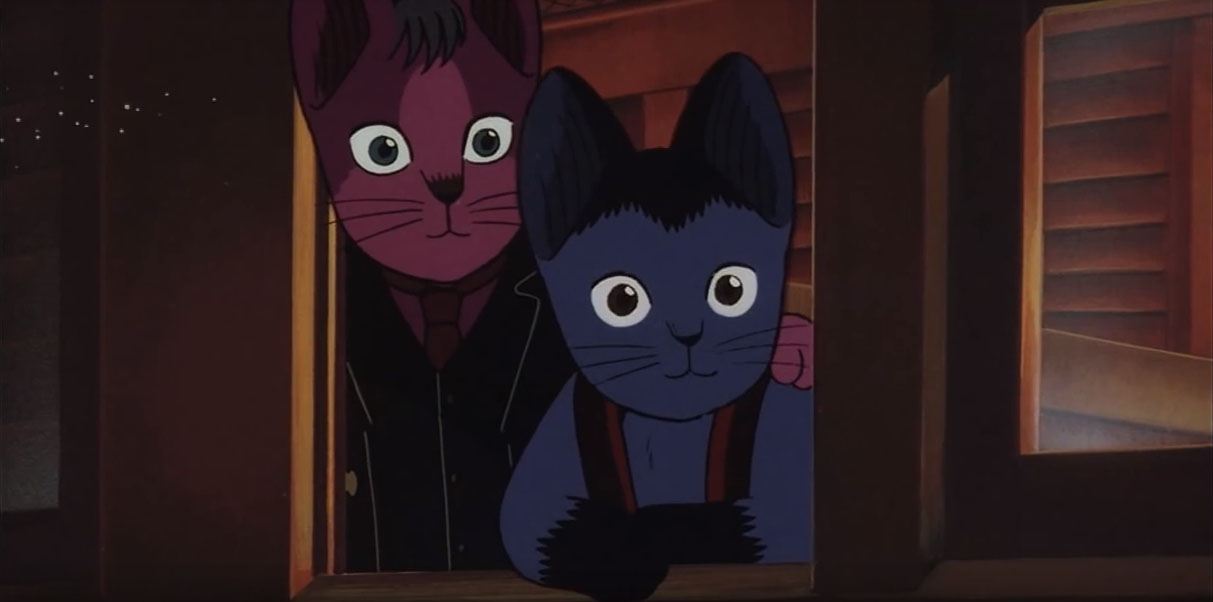
Campanella (left) and Giovanni (right)

The film was produced independently by Nippon Herald Films and animated by Group TAC. The most prominent alteration made in the film is that the main two characters (and their classmates) are depicted as anthropomorphic cats. Some other characters, such as the children from the ship, are humans.

The captions throughout the film are in Esperanto as an homage to Kenji Miyazawa, who was strongly interested in the language. The film's title in Esperanto is Nokto de la Galaksia Fervojo and is shown on the cover of the soundtrack. Text appearing in various scenes was also written in Esperanto, such as writing on the blackboard in the classroom. A newspaper being printed in the printing house where Giovanni works tells of the shipwreck of a passenger ship bearing the Esperanto phrase Dio, pli apud vin ("Nearer, My God, to Thee").

The film soundtrack was composed by Yellow Magic Orchestra member Haruomi Hosono. Storyboard artist Kōichi Mashimo went on to form the animation studio Bee Train.

The second movement of Dvořák's ninth symphony scores a scene toward the end of the film that is titled after the piece's popular name, New World Symphony.

== Reception and legacy ==
Justin Sevakis of Anime News Network commented that the film was "a beautiful journey, albeit an ominous one. Slowly, the mood of the trek shifts from excited and childlike to desperate and profound". Carlos Ross of T.H.E.M. gave it three out of five stars, praising its handling of death and stating that it "does have a good tale to tell" while comparing watching the film to a taking a long train ride. He called the film more of "an artsy curiosity" and that "children would probably nod off or walk away [from it] after the first hour or so". The film received the Ōfuji Noburō Award in 1985.

The 2012 film The Life of Budori Gusuko, another adaptation of Kenji Miyazawa's works directed by Gisaburō Sugii, would also depict the characters as anthropomorphic cats, reusing Giovanni's character design for its main character Budori Gusuko.

== Home media ==
The film was licensed by Central Park Media in the late 1990s, and was released on VHS with English subtitles. The subtitled version played irregularly on the Canadian station Space in 1997 and 1998. When it was later released on DVD in 2001, CPM produced an English dub that starred Veronica Taylor as Giovanni and Crispin Freeman as Campanella. The film was re-licensed by Discotek Media and released on DVD in 2015 and Blu-ray in 2016.

== See also ==
- Hoshi meguri no uta
- Spring and Chaos
- The Life of Budori Gusuko
- Train de nuit dans la Voie lactée, a 2026 comic book based on the same novel
