= Nine (manga) =

Japanese manga series

- Cover of volume 1 of wideban release.
- Genre: Sports
- Manga
- Written by: Mitsuru Adachi
- Published by: Shogakukan
- Magazine: Shōnen Sunday Zōkan
- Original run: September 25, 1978 – October 25, 1980
- Volumes: 5
- Anime television film
- Directed by: Gisaburō Sugii
- Written by: Hiroichi Fuse (film 1); Shin'ichi Shirayama (film 2); Yumiko Takaboshi (film 3)
- Music by: Hiroaki Serizawa; Yasunori Tsuchida (film 1)
- Studio: Group TAC
- Original network: Fuji TV
- Released: May 4, 1983 (Note: Uncut version was released in theaters on September 16, 1983.) (film 1); December 18, 1983 (film 2); September 5, 1984 (film 3)
- Runtime: 75 minutes (each)
- Live-action television film
- Directed by: Yoshiharu Ueki
- Written by: Fumiyo Asō
- Original network: Fuji TV
- Released: January 5, 1987

Nine (Japanese: ナイン, Hepburn: Nain) is a baseball manga series by Mitsuru Adachi. It was serialized in Monthly Shōnen Sunday Zōkan from the October 1978 through November 1980 issues. The series was adapted into three anime television films and a live-action television drama. An altered version of the first anime film was released in theaters, with new and re-arranged music.

The story is about two friends who were star athletes in junior high school who decide, on entering high school, to join the struggling baseball club so they can have a challenge. The title comes from the nine members of a baseball team.

== Plot summary ==
Just before entering Seishū High School, track star Katsuya Niimi and judo champion Susumu Karasawa see a girl crying as the school loses a baseball game. The boys decide to join the team and improve it in order to make her smile. The girl turns out to be Yuri Nakao, daughter of the baseball coach, and they learn the baseball team will be shut down if it doesn't start winning. The series follows the three, as well as pitcher Eiji Kurahashi, as Niimi and Karasawa learn about baseball and what it means to be one of nine players on a team, as they work together through high school make it to Kōshien.

== Characters ==
Character voices listed are for the anime releases only.

Katsuya Niimi (新見 克也)
Voiced by: Toru Furuya
Center fielder on the Seishū High School baseball club, in love with Yuri. In junior high, he held the national records for the 100 meter and 200 m races for his age group. His favorite food is gomokuzushi. He wears the number 8 on his jersey.
Yuri Nakao (中尾 百合)
Voiced by: Mariko Ishihara (TV movie 1), Mariko Kurata (TV movie 2), Narumi Yasuda (TV movie 3)
The manager of the Seishū High School baseball club and daughter of the baseball coach. There is a growing romance between Yuri and Katsuya.
Susumu Karasawa (唐沢 進)
Voiced by: Kei Tomiyama
Right fielder on the Seishū High School baseball club. In junior high, he was the prefectural champion in judo. He wears the number 9.
Eiji Kurahashi (倉橋 永二)
Voiced by: Kaneto Shiozawa
Left-handed pitching ace on the Seishū High School baseball club, and was one of the top pitchers in all of Japan in middle school. Lives with his father, a truck driver.
Yukimi Yasuda (安田 雪美)
Voiced by: Tamie Kubota
Star athlete of the Seishū High School track club, who has a crush on Katsuya since Middle School. After transferring to Seishū at the beginning of the school year, she begins pursuing him, much to the annoyance of Yuri.
Kentarō Yamanaka (山中 健太郎)
Voiced by: Akira Kamiya
A childhood friend of Yuri, and ace pitcher at Bunan High School where he has taken his team to victory at Kōshien. After an unexpected reunion with Yuri, he becomes the romantic rival of Katsuya.
Jirō Yamanaka (山中 二郎)
Voiced by: Yoshikazu Hirano
Kentarō's younger brother and a new member of the Seishū High School baseball club, playing third base. He has a crush on Yukimi. He wears the number 5.
Chimi Yamanaka (山中 智美)
Younger sister of the Yamanaka brothers. She tries to mediate the relationship between Yuri and Kentarō, who in turn uses her to interfere with the developing romance between Yuri and Katsuya.
Coach Nakao
Voiced by: Ichirō Nagai (TV movies), Kōichi Kitamura (theatrical movie)
The coach of the Seishū High School baseball club. He is in jeopardy of losing his job for not having won a single game, which he does with the addition of Eiji Kurahashi to the team. He formerly coached Kentarō for a short time when he was younger, and they were neighbours.
Kazuya Niimi's father
Voiced by: Tatsuyuki Jinnai
A former baseball player who helps Eiji join the baseball team after talking to his father, with whom he formed the winning battery at the invitational Kōshien tournament of 20-odd years prior to the events of the manga.
Kazuya Niimi's mother
Voiced by: Kazuko Makino
Appears in the theatrical movie.
Eiji Kurashashi's father
Voiced by: Takeshi Aono
Appears in the theatrical movie.
Yukimi Yasuda's grandmother
Voiced by: Miyoko Asō
Appears in the theatrical movie.

== TV movies ==
=== Film 1 ===
The first Nine TV movie aired on May 4, 1983, on Fuji TV's Nissei Family Special program.

==== Music ====
Opening theme
"Love/Innocent" (LOVE·イノセント, Rabu Inosento)
- Vocals: Mariko Kuratata and also known as Mariko Tsubota
- Lyrics: Masao Urino
- Composer: Hiroaki Serizawa
Insert songs
"Invited Desires" (つのる思い, Tsunoru Omoi)
"Goodbye to Sadness" (悲しみにサヨナラ, Kanashimi ni Sayonara)
- Vocals: Mariko Kurata and Hiroaki Serizawa
- Lyrics: Masao Urino
- Composer: Hiroaki Serizawa
Ending theme
"Midsummer Runner" (真夏のランナー, Mannatsu no Runner)
- Vocals: Mariko Kurata and Hiroaki Serizawa
- Lyrics: Masao Urino
- Composer: Hiroaki Serizawa

==== Staff ====
- Director: Gisaburō Sugii
- Teleplay: Hiroichi Fuse
- Animation Director: Tsuneo Maeda
- Art Director: Hiroshi Ōhno
- Music: Hiroaki Serizawa
- Audio Director: Atsushi Tashiro
- Production: Toho, Group TAC

=== Film 2 ===
The second Nine TV movie, Nine 2: Sweetheart Declaration (ナイン 恋人宣言, Nain Koibito Sengen), aired on December 18, 1983, on Fuji TV's Nissei Family Special program.

==== Music ====
Opening theme
"Sweetheart Declaration" (恋人宣言, Koibito Sengen)
- Vocals: Mariko Kurata
- Lyrics: Mariko Ryū
- Composer: Hiroaki Serizawa
Insert songs
"Blue Sky Feelings" (青空気分, Aozora Kibun)
"My Young Boy" (私のYoung Boy, Watashi no Yangu Bōi)
- Vocals: Mariko Kurata and Hiroaki Serizawa
- Lyrics: Mariko Ryū
- Composer: Hiroaki Serizawa
Ending theme
"Midsummer Runner"
- Vocals: Mariko Kurata and Hiroaki Serizawa
- Lyrics: Masao Urino
- Composer: Hiroaki Serizawa

==== Staff ====
- Director: Gisaburō Sugii
- Teleplay: Shin'ichi Shirayama
- Animation Director: Tsuneo Maeda
- Chief Animator: Minoru Maeda
- Art Director: Katsuyoshi Kanemura
- Music: Hiroaki Serizawa
- Audio Director: Atsushi Tashiro
- Production: Toho, Group TAC

=== Film 3 ===
The third Nine TV movie, Nine: The Last Chapter (ナイン 完結編, Nain Kanketsuhen), aired on September 5, 1984, on Fuji TV's Nissei Family Special program.

==== Music ====
Opening theme
"Endless Summer" (エンドレスサマー, Endoresu Samā)
- Vocals: Hiroaki Serizawa
- Lyrics: Masao Urino
- Composer: Hiroaki Serizawa
Insert songs
"Around August" (八月のゆくえ, Hachigatsu no Yukue)
"Boys in Love" (Boys in love, Bōisu in Rabu)
- Vocals: Hiroaki Serizawa
- Lyrics: Masao Urino
- Composer: Hiroaki Serizawa
Ending theme
"Midsummer Runner"
- Vocals: Mariko Kurata and Hiroaki Serizawa
- Lyrics: Masao Urino
- Composer: Hiroaki Serizawa

==== Staff ====
- Director: Gisaburō Sugii
- Teleplay: Yumiko Takaboshi
- Animation Director: Tsuneo Maeda
- Key Animation Director: Minoru Maeda
- Art Director: Katsuyoshi Kanemura
- Music: Hiroaki Serizawa
- Audio Director: Atsushi Tashiro
- Production: Toho, Group TAC

== Theatrical movie ==
The first Nine TV movie was remade into a theatrical movie titled Nine the Original (ナイン オリジナル版, Nain Orijinaruban), released on September 16, 1983, by Toho. Modifications were made to the original TV movie to fix problems with it, and some of the voice actors and background music were changed as well. When the Nine movies are rebroadcast on TV, this movie is shown in place of the original TV movie.

=== Music ===
Theme songs
"Amateur Photograph" (青いフォトグラフ, Aoi Fotogurafu)
"Love Taking Flight" (愛を翼にして, Ai o Tsubasa ni Shite)
- Vocals: Mariko Kurata (AKA: Mariko Tsubota)
- Lyrics: Masao Urino
- Composer: Hiroaki Serizawa
Insert songs
"Invited Desires"
"Sentimental Season" (涙色の季節, Namida-iro no Kisetsu)
"Midsummer Runner"
- Vocals: Mariko Kurata and Hiroaki Serizawa
- Lyrics: Masao Urino
- Composer: Hiroaki Serizawa

=== Staff ===
- Director: Gisaburō Sugii
- Screenplay: Hiroichi Fuse
- Animation Director: Tsuneo Maeda
- Art Director: Hiroshi Ōhno
- Music: Hiroaki Serizawa, Yasunori Tsuchida
- Audio Director: Atsushi Tashiro
- Producers: Yūkichi Ōhashi, Atsushi Tashiro
- Production: Toho, Group TAC, Fuji TV

== TV live action drama ==
A Nine live action TV drama special aired on January 5, 1987, on Fuji TV's Monday Dramaland (月曜ドラマランド, Getsuyō Doramarando) program.

=== Cast ===
- Aki Asakura (Yuri Nakao)
- Kazuya Takahashi (Katsuya Niimi)
- Kōyō Maeda (Jirō Yamanaka)
- Mikio Ōsawa (Kentarō Yamanaka)
- Mami Ōtsuka (Yukimi Yasuda)

=== Staff ===
- Original Work: Mitsuru Adachi
- Director: Yoshiharu Ueki
- Teleplay: Fumiyo Asō
- Production: Fuji TV
