= Yōko Sasaki =

Japanese actress, voice actress and narrator

- 佐々木 瑶子
- Born: January 2, 1975 (age 50); Ibaraki Prefecture, Japan
- Occupations: Actress; voice actress; narrator
- Years active: 1995–present
- Height: 160 cm (5 ft 3 in)

Yōko Sasaki (佐々木 瑶子, Sasaki Yōko, born January 2, 1975) is a Japanese actress, voice actress and narrator from Ibaraki Prefecture.

== Filmography ==
=== Television animation ===
- Captain Tsubasa (Heisei era edition) (Tsubasa's mother)
- Hidamari no Ki (Umika)
- MÄR (Rapunzel)
- Kochira Katsushika-ku Kameari Kōen-mae Hashutsujo (Ibu Honzen)
- Kokoro Library (Midori Okajima)
- Martial Arts Cooking Legend Bistro-Recipe (Yōen Chūnangu)
- Ojarumaru (Imomushi, Ageha, housewife)
- Shingu: Secret of the Stellar Wars (Kumi Isozaki)
- Shrine of the Morning Mist (Yukie Uranami)
- Shugo Chara! (Orie)
- The Story of Saiunkoku (Rin Sai-Tei)
- Street Fighter II V (Cammy)
- Super Doll Licca-chan (Orie Kayama)
- Soar High! Isami (Haruka Kōboku, Kanata)
- Tytania (Tereeza Tytania)
- You're Under Arrest Second Season (Carnaby)

=== OVA ===
- Lament of the Lamb (Natsuko Eda)

=== Theatrical animation ===
- Street Fighter II: The Animated Movie (Cammy)
- Super Doll Licca-chan: Licca-chan Zettai Zetsumei! Doll Knights no Kiseki (Orie Kayama)

=== Video games ===
- Kenka Banchō (Saki Asaoka)
- Love Songs Idol Classmate (Miyu Amagi)
- Suikoden V (Hasuwāru, Kisara, Suparu)

=== Drama ===
- Doctor Kotō Clinic
- Hi no Ryōsen
- Tuesday Suspense Theater
- Waterboys
