= Atagoul =

Japanese media franchise

アタゴオル
- Manga

Atagoal Monogatari
- Written by: Hiroshi Masumura
- Published by: Asahi Sonorama
- Magazine: Manga Shōnen
- Original run: 1976 – 1981
- Volumes: 6
- Manga

Atagoal Tamatebako
- Written by: Hiroshi Masumura
- Published by: Kaiseisha Fantasy Comics
- Magazine: MOE
- Original run: 1984 – 1989
- Volumes: 9
- Manga

Atagoal
- Written by: Hiroshi Masumura
- Published by: Scholar Comics Burger
- Magazine: Comic Burger
- Original run: 1994 – 1995
- Volumes: 2
- Manga

Atagoal wa Neko no Mori
- Written by: Hiroshi Masumura
- Published by: Media Factory
- Magazine: Monthly Comic Flapper
- Original run: November 5, 1999 – November 5, 2011
- Volumes: 18
- Anime film

Atagoal: Cat's Magical Forest (アタゴオルは猫の森, Atagoal wa Neko no Mori)
- Directed by: Mizuho Nishikubo
- Studio: Digital Frontier
- Released: October 14, 2006

Atagoul (アタゴオル) is a Japanese manga by Hiroshi Masumura and was adapted into a CG animated film in 2006.

== Cast ==
- Koichi Yamadera as Hideyoshi
- Asahi Uchida as Tempura
- Aya Hirayama as Princess Tsukimi
- Etsuko Kozakura as Hideko
- Seiichi Tanabe as Gilbars
- Mari Natsuki as Queen Pirea
- Kei Tani as Amigen
- Shirou Sano as Ryukoma
- Hiroko Taniyama as Themari
