= Train de nuit dans la Voie lactée =

2026 comic book by Adrien Demont

- Page count: 176 pages
- Publisher: Morgen

Creative team
- Writer: Adrien Demont, after Kenji Miyazawa
- Artist: Adrien Demont

Original publication
- Date of publication: 14 January 2026
- Language: French
- ISBN: 978-2-3872-5000-1

Train de nuit dans la Voie lactée (lit. 'Night Train on the Milky Way') is a 2026 French comic book by Adrien Demont. It follows two boys who enter a flying train that takes them on a cosmic ride. It is based on the novel Night on the Galactic Railroad by Kenji Miyazawa. The drawings are made with crayon techniques with light brown and deep blue colours.

Benjamin Roure of BoDoï called the album visually magnificent, but somewhat distant to its subject and with vague characters who look like dolls, which makes the read tiring after a while.

== See also ==
- Night on the Galactic Railroad (film), a 1985 film based on the same novel
