= Super Doll Licca-chan =

Anime

- Promo-poster for Licca-chan series

スーパードール★リカちゃん (Sūpā Dōru Rika-chan)
- Genre: Magical girl
- Anime television series
- Directed by: Gisaburō Sugii
- Produced by: Makiko Iwata; Nobuhiro Osawa
- Written by: Kazuhiko Soma; Mami Watanabe
- Music by: Akihiko Hirama
- Studio: Madhouse
- Original network: TXN (TV Tokyo)
- Original run: October 6, 1998 – September 28, 1999
- Episodes: 52
- Manga
- Written by: Mia Ikumi
- Published by: Kodansha
- Magazine: Nakayoshi
- Original run: November 1998 – October 1999
- Volumes: 2
- Anime film

Super Doll Licca-chan: Licca-chan Zettai Zetsumei! Doll Knights no Kiseki
- Directed by: Gisaburô Sugii; Tetsuya Kumagai
- Produced by: Naoto Hashimoto
- Music by: Katsumi Horii
- Studio: Madhouse
- Released: July 31, 1999
- Runtime: 30 minutes

Super Doll Licca-chan (スーパードール★リカちゃん, Sūpā Dōru Rika-chan) is a Japanese anime television series based on the Licca-chan fashion doll, which ran on TV Tokyo in 1998–1999. Kodansha also serialized a manga based on the anime series in its monthly manga magazine Nakayoshi. The story follows an ordinary elementary school girl named Licca Kayama and the strange circumstances surrounding her origins, as well as the origins of her protector, Doll Licca.

== Plot ==
After finding out that she is the princess of the Doll Kingdom, third grade student Licca Kayama is in terrible danger. Now, the evil Dr. Scarecrow is after both her and her royal throne, putting her life at risk. Licca's grandmother decides to give her a set of dolls as a gift. When needed, the dolls will transform into larger versions of themselves known as the Doll Knights. Together, they will protect Licca at all costs so she can continue living her normal everyday life.

== Characters ==
Doll Licca (ドールリカ, Dōru Rika): The protector of Licca, is a doll knight who uses a magic yo-yo called "Light Spinner" to fight. She is very noble, and has never hesitated to take risks to protect Licca and her friends. The magic spell to wake up Doll Licca using the Calling Pendant is Tururu Kururu Tureiro Kureira (トゥルールクルールトゥレイロクレイラ).

Voiced by: Tomo Sakurai

Doll Izumi (ドールイヅミ(イズミ), Dōru Izumi): is the second doll knight who uses a baton as a weapon called "Light Circle". At start being animated, do not know who is doing it, since according to Nanae only Franz could invoke it, but after a while it is discovered that Catherine was summoning her at the whole time and then by Sumire. The magic spell to wake up Doll Izumi using the Calling Choker is Fururu Furora Gurine Guraine (フルールフローラグリーネグライネ).

Voiced by: Michiko Neya

Doll Isamu (ドールイサム, Dōru Isamu): is the third doll knight who wields a huge sword called "Light Thunder" to fight, with which it is able to shed energy projectiles, and cut his enemies. In the middle of the anime was in the service of evil under orders of Devaul, but then is rescued by Doll Licca and returns to fight on the side of good under the stewardship of Dai. The magic spell to wake up Doll Isamu using the Calling Watch is Pereso Perese Burune Buraine (ペレーゾ・ペレーゼ・ブルーネ・ブライネ).

Voiced by: Kentarou Itou

Licca Kayama (香山リカ, Kayama Rika): the protagonist of the series, is a cheerful and energetic girl. Her mother and grandmother belong to royalty of Culture Fantasy, so she is the princess of the Doll Kingdom but she doesn't know it. When she was just a baby her mother fled there with her and her grandmother, to escape the clutches of the evil Devaul. She has a crush on her neighbor, Rui. She was given by her grandmother a pink bracelet called "Calling Ring" which glows when she's in trouble and Doll Licca comes to the rescue. In later episodes, her "Calling Ring" was upgraded by her grandmother and Licca is able to summon Doll Licca whenever she and her friends are in danger.

Voiced by: Yuka Kouno

Nanae Kayama (香山七重, Kayama Nanae): Licca's grandmother, twin sister of Yae, Franz's wife and Orie's mother. She fled with her daughter and granddaughter to the world of humans, carrying a suitcase with the Doll Knights inside. Her pendant is able to wake up Doll Licca, and uses that power to protect Licca throughout the series. She is very kind, always in a good mood and able to do anything for her daughter and granddaughter.

Voiced by: Kazue Komiya

Yae Kayama (香山八重, Kayama Yae): the twin sister of Nanae, Orie's aunt and Licca's grandaunt, queen of Doll Kingdom, which was possessed by the evil Devaul.

Voiced by: Kazue Komiya

Orie Kayama (香山織江, Kayama Orie): Mother of Licca, Queen of Doll Kingdom. She turned down her duty as a queen because she was in love with a human, Pierre (future father of Licca). She fled with her mother and daughter to the world of humans to escape Devaul, and always made every effort to protect Licca.

Voiced by: Yoko Sasaki

Sumire Shinohara (篠原スミレ, Shinohara Sumire): Licca's best friend, is characterized by her nobility and romance, she spends imagining romantic scenes with Dai since she has a crush on him. During the second half of the series she receives a green bracelet that can invoke Doll Izumi.

Voiced by: Miyu Kawakami

Dai Takabayashi (高林ダイ, Takabayashi Dai): one of Licca's friends, very restless, naughty and aggressive. Always fights with Licca, although she's really in love with Rui and appears whenever he gets very jealous. He receives a blue bracelet to summon Doll Isamu when there is trouble.

Voiced by: Yūko Mita

Scarecrow (スケアクロウ, Sukeakurō): a magician of Doll Kingdom, which is under the command of Devaul. Ordered by Devaul to kidnap Licca, until he reformed on the halfway of the series to defend the princess.

Voiced by: Rokurou Naya

Pierre Kayama (香山ピエール, Kayama Piēru): Licca's father, a musician whose melody is so powerful that it was the final cause of death of Devaul.

Voiced by: Keiji Fujiwara

Tomonori "Tomo" Michitani (蕗谷トモノリ, Michitani Tomonori): Another friend of Licca, noted for his intelligence and his way of being a bit strange. Most of his hobbies include astronomy, reading books, science and everything related to the study and more than once saved his brilliant ideas to his friends.

Voiced by: Wasabi Mizuta

Rui Makiyama (麻樹山ルイ, Makiyama Rui): a student who attends college in Ozura and Licca's neighbor. He befriends the family quickly, and Licca is in love with him. He discovers the secret of the Kayama Family after seeing Doll Licca many times and recognize Licca's bracelet. Thanks to him, Dai discovered the whereabouts of the Doll Isamu Calling Ring, and on one occasion he was who encouraged him to rescue Licca.

Voiced by: Mitsuru Miyamoto

Catherine (カトリーヌ, Katorīnu): Licca's mysterious classmate who appears halfway through the series with Doll Izumi Calling Choker. Helps protect Licca, first anonymously and then discovered, invoking Doll Izumi whenever necessary. On the second halfway of the series it is later revealed that she hides the Doll Izumi Calling Ring in her clothing and Sumire accidentally found it when it fell in the former's pocket and got captured by Misty in the process to save Licca.

Voiced by: Ikue Ootani

Franz (フランツ, Furantsu): Licca's grandfather, which was confined to the forest of Al (or Au) to flee the castle. He gave his choker to Catherine to invoke Doll Izumi.

Devaul (デヴォール, Devōru): the main antagonist of the series. A demon who possessed Yae in the forest of Al (Au) and from that moment it was proposed to take full control of Doll Kingdom and later revealed his true form as an enormous dragon. He wants to kidnap Licca. The Doll Knights battled Devaul to protect Licca and her family and friends. With a help from the god Al, Devaul was destroyed forever.

Voiced by: Eiji Takemoto

Misty (ミスティー, Misutī): a creation of Devaul to destroy Licca's squires and to kidnap her. Her powers are far superior to those of any squire, and only three of them can be at your level. She does not totally agree with the thinking of her master, but must obey anyway. After being defeated by the dolls, Devaul absorbed her again.

Voiced by: Akiko Hiramatsu

Puru (プル) and Waya (ワーヤ): Scarecrow's assistants, following the orders of their master in all circumstances. In the second half of the series they reformed and protect Licca, using all possible means.

Voiced by: Atsuko Tanaka

Dana (ダナ): An evil witch of the Doll Kingdom who enjoys eating children (either boys or girls), that was dormant in a cold region as an old body. She sorts Giize to brings Dai, Tomo and Sumire to her castle, using them as a bait for Licca. After Licca, Sumire, Tomo, Dai, and Catherine arrive in the place, she decides to eat Licca and the other kids instead of give them to Devaul. During the fight against the three Doll Knights, she transforms herself into a giant scorpion, but even so, she was destroyed by them. Devaul sorts Giize awake her to bring Licca for him, so, he gives the souls of children to Dana, and she rejuvenates and goes to her castle in the Doll Kingdom.

== Staff ==
- Created by Takara TOMY
- Executive Producer: Tarō Maki (GENCO)
- Planning Assistance: Weave
- Series Organization: Mami Watanabe, Kazuhiko Sōma
- Character Design: Tetsuya Kumagai
- Music: Akihiko Hirama, Katsumi Horii
- Director: Gisaburō Sugii
- Animation Production: Madhouse
- A Production of: TV Tokyo, Dentsu, GENCO

== Episodes ==
No.	Title	Original air date
1	"The Mysterious Doll Knights" "Fushigi na Dōru Naitzu" (神秘的な人形の騎士)	6 October 1998
Upon seeing a newspaper article about the Fantasy Kingdom setting up a museum exhibit in her hometown, Nanae Kayama reaches for a suitcase to examine one of the three dolls in it, predicting rough sailing ahead for her granddaughter Licca. A chance encounter with the university student Rui Makiyama, who tells them about the Doll Kingdom and the Doll Knights prior to rushing off to class becomes the genesis of Licca developing a crush on Rui, in contrast to Dai being jealous of the "weird" young man before both kids soon discover that there is something wrong when they are the only ones at the lunchtime rendez-vous point. Things quickly come to a head when Pull successfully isolates and illuminates Licca as the Doll Kingdom crown princess prior to Dr. Scarecrow's hasty capture attempt, which ultimately implodes the whole operation when Nanae bootstraps Doll Licca for battle, when her granddaughter's Calling Bracelet activates. A short battle later, Doll Licca demolishes the entire operation and easily foils her mistress' abduction.
2	"Love Fortune-Telling of the Evening Moon" "Tsuki no Yo no Koi Uranai" (愛占いイブニングムーンの告知)	13 October 1998
As if she had telepathically sensed it in her sleep, Licca dreams about Rui Makiyama after he arrives at the Kayama residence where Nanae and Orie greet him in earnest prior to leading him to his rented room; undaunted by Nanae extinguishing her voyeurism the next morning, Licca speculates on Rui's personality while Sumire daydreams about Dai during class. While Licca and Sumire revel at the pleasant surprise that is Rui Makiyama coming upon the girls exploring his room, Pull and Wire have set up a detective shop to acquire information to plan their next abduction attempt. Licca and Sumire appraising the efficacy of a girlish superstition the backdrop thereof. While Dai and Sumire initially find their adversaries too well prepared to repulse their inhibitory efforts on Licca's behalf, they ultimately buy time for Nanae to bootstrap Doll Licca for battle and Rui follows soon after as a supplement; the collaborative intercession is not enough to forestall the price Nanae pays for wielding the Doll Knights in battle.
3	"The Virgin Mary's Smile" "Maria-sama no Hohoemi" (聖母マリアの微笑)	20 October 1998
Satomi is in for a blitzkrieg lesson of curiosity killing the cat when Dr. Scarecrow's attempt to take her captive panics the poor nun into being sidelined with a broken arm and sets the stage, for demonstrating why it is a bad idea to leave too much to the imagination, especially one not unlike what Dai possesses.
4	"The Halloween Guest" "Harou~īn no Okyakusama" (ハロウィーンゲスト)	27 October 1998
While the Pumpkin King looks delightful upon the Halloween preparations, Licca is eager to begin her home commute to appraise the status of Orie's efforts on synthesizing her costume, after Dai leads Tomonori through demonstrating his perspective of how Halloween should be spent.
5	"Mother's Birthday" "Okāsan no Tanjōbi" (母の誕生日)	3 November 1998
Dr. Scarecrow is facing an obdurate objurgation to capture Licca who is merging computations with Nanae over the logistics of Orie's birthday party. Licca easily galvanizing her classmates obfuscates Pull fuming in frustration, as she computes how to comply Dr. Scarecrow's order to steal Doll Licca before directing Wire to follow Nanae. Orie's birthday is a fusillade of activity as Nanae leads the caterers in setting up the scene alongside Rui when the guests arrive ahead of schedule starting with Dai and Tomonori while Licca desperately tries to finish the dexter mitten when Orie returns home. The unfinished dexter mitten's ultimate irony is that its unraveling correlates to Pull's mission to capture the Doll Knights whose animation has no distance restriction; Dr. Scarecrow's abduction attempt foiled yet again is cold comfort to Licca until Orie interjects her perspective of the best birthday present she has ever received.
6	"Around The Dreaming Star" "Yume no Hoshi wa Meguru" (夢見るスター周辺)	10 November 1998
Tomonori Michitani is in seventh heaven as he prosecutes an investigation of the Naruhu Comet's arrival after its thirty year journey around the Solar System, oblivious to the fact that he has attracted the attention of Dr. Scarecrow, who plans to wield him in his next attempt to abduct Licca. Disguising himself as the missing Professor Kanga Kurō, Dr. Scarecrow begins his operation in earnest by capitalizing on Tomonori's ambivalence about having to exclusively decide for science or his friends, which leaves behind a lot of collateral damage that quickly brings things to a head.
7	"The Magical Herbal Tea" "Mahō no Hābu Tī" (ザ魔法のハーブのコーヒー)	17 November 1998
The tense conversation that follows suggests that the Doll Kingdom is in some kind of danger that Licca is needed to resolve and that Dr. Scarecrow is not exactly evil.
8	"Dai is a Little Knight" "Dai wa Chiisana Kishi" (大さ一リトルナイト)	24 November 1998
It seems that Saint Terejia Gakuen has an autumn ritual known as the weekend home-stay in which the students are randomly chosen as a guest or a host along with the association thereof in an attempt to foster a more comprehensive perspective of appreciation for the concept of family -- case in point when the teacher indicates that Licca's family is hosting the college student Rui Makiyama. The ironic silver lining is that Pull and Wire's repulsing Dai climbing to Licca's rescue ultimately allows Doll Licca to do her thing; for Dai, Dr. Scarecrow's ambush still costs valuable time in transporting his edible payload home much to the family's consternation.
9	"The Secret of the Sound of the Bell" "Kanenome no Himitsu" (ベルの音の秘密)	1 December 1998
It is extremely difficult to deny the presence of a deviant diagnostic when the bells stay silent; an injured dove in the bell tower whose proximity by the students Sister Chiaki has been enjoined to always inhibit.
10	"Another Licca" "Mōhitori no Rika" (別のリカ)	8 December 1998
Licca had it demonstrated that Doll Licca will intercede fiercely on her behalf whenever Dr. Scarecrow launches an abduction attempt. It has really never made the connection in her mind as to what her guardian looks like, until Dai comes upon a traveling artist named Mark whose artwork is based on what he sees in his dreams.
11	"The White Wedding Dress of Memories" "Omoide no Shiroi Doresu" (思い出の白いウェディングドレス)	15 December 1998
As Tomonori points out before Dai suppresses him, Licca would normally set course for home after school as charged by the teachers. However, Orie is expecting her daughter to participate in the exhibition of some recently completed clothing designs and inadvertently gives Pull a skeleton key for defining the logistics of the next abduction attempt while contemplating the conundrum of needing more models than she has. Nanae's jubilation at being able to have a meal with Orie and Licca as a family quickly gives way to Orie pining for her husband Pierre as she reminisces about her prologue with him.
12	"The Gift of the Snowy Day" "Yuki no Hi no Okurimono" (ギフトの雪の降る日)	22 December 1998
Licca intercepting Dai and Tomonori with the cleaning duties prior to begin her own home commute from school. She quickly gives way to Dr. Scarecrow savagely upbraiding Pull and Wire to step up their efforts, since the Doll Kingdom designates December 25 as the Day of Gratitude, where it is illegal to do anything but observe it.
13	"Aji the Lost Cat" "Mayoi Neko no Aji" (猫を忘れました味)	29 December 1998
An ill-designed animal carrier and an inattentive old lady become the preamble for François to play a pivotal role in Dr. Scarecrow's latest attempt to capture Licca, whose first encounter with the feline is in the front yard of her house just as she is beginning her school commute before Orie's maternal inquiries disrupt Licca's sincere but ill-fated attempt to win François' trust.
14	"The Sunday Shootout" "Nichiyōbi no Kettō" (日曜日シュート)	5 January 1999
The collaborative prologue Hide and Tetsu have built with Dai along with Licca's frustration at being left out of their dodgeball game is scant preparation for an encounter with Souta Mizushima who leads the group of friends Dai spent time with in kindergarten; the ensuing adversarial dodgeball volley vividly illuminating the rivalry between the two boys. Dr. Scarecrow's conspicuous abduction attempt becomes the ultimate skeleton key for Dai and Souta to finally resolve their differences once Doll Licca drives Dr. Scarecrow into retreat after a short battle.
15	"Rui's Girlfriend" "Rui-san no Koibitō" (ルイの女友達)	12 January 1999
Dr. Scarecrow is in scalding hot water for his many failed abduction attempts as Orie's evil aunt Yae reads him the riot act clearly frightened for the Doll Kingdom's survival. Meanwhile, Licca is oblivious to Dr. Scarecrow renewing his resolve to capture her, when she repels Dai's abrasive criticism of the bookmark she wants to give Rui.
16	"The Witch of the Frozen World" "Tsumetai Kuni no Majo" (冷凍世界の魔女)	19 January 1999
Yae is dividing her energies between bristling with frustration at Dr. Scarecrow's abduction.
17	"Watch out for Strange Predictions" "Ayashī Kanegodō ni Gōyōjin" (気を付けろ奇妙な予測のための)	26 January 1999
As she has been continually demonstrated, Yae is quite upset at Dr. Scarecrow, having yet another of his abduction attempts foiled as she directs him to steal her grandniece' call bracelet using deception.
18	"The Three Knights of the Fairy Tale Kingdom" "Ōtōgi no Kuni no San-Jūshi" (ザ三騎士のザ妖精物語イギリス)	2 February 1999
As Chiaki reminds the class, Saint Terezia Academy is to have a story recital by the selected representatives of each class; one of which is Sumire even though she is having a bit of writer's block as she develops her story. Undaunted by Sumire having recovered from her cold, Dr. Scarecrow ultimately tries to push ahead with his abduction attempt only to find to his horror that Licca has basically summarized the prologue and plight of the Doll Kingdom for the whole school.
19	"The Unmoving Doll Licca" "Ugokanai Dōru Rika" (動かない人形リカ)	9 February 1999
Pull and Wire's collaborative confusion over the Valentine's Day hullabaloo quickly gives way to Dr. Scarecrow's surveillance orders for Licca, while Yae and Dr. Scarecrow are resolving the logistics of their upcoming operation, Licca and Sumire have other things on their minds as they compute how to acknowledge Valentine's Day.
20	"The Secret of the Runaway Queen" "Nigeta Ojō no Himitsu" (秘密の暴走女王)	16 February 1999
An epidemic sweeps over Saint Terezia Academy in the form of an exciting detective story series that enthralls Licca and her friends to the point where they start to forget about the dynamics of real life; examples of which is when Dai inadvertently draws his grandmother's ire when he forgets about dinner time, while Orie has to prompt Licca to comply her bedtime.
21	"Rui's Treasure" "Rui-san no Takaramono" (Ruiさんの宝)	23 February 1999
While out on the town for diurnal euphoria, Dai and Tomonori come upon Rui waiting with Licca and Sumire to intercept a transit coach; fuming that Licca has repulsed his inquiries, Dai decides to follow suit with Tomonori who makes some iconoclastic observations during the journey that enable the boys to closely follow Rui and the girls.
22	"Wake up, Doll Isamu" "Mezameta Dōru Isamu" (目を覚ます、人形勇)	2 March 1999
Successfully acquiring the Doll Isamu Calling Ring is an impressive accomplishment; still, its consistent security while successfully utilizing it against Yae and Dr. Scarecrow is what will define the war's epilogue. While Sumire and Dai speculate upon the meaning of there now being two Calling Rings in their possession, Nanae confirms the authenticity.
23	"The Lost Extraterrestrials" "Maigo no Uchūijin" (ロスト地球外生命体)	9 March 1999
Back in the Doll Kingdom, Yae is overjoyed at having her guardian Doll Isamu available for battle as she decides zero hour for bringing Licca back to the Doll Kingdom by having Doll Isamu streak across the sky upon returning to Earth; not realizing that what she saw last night is actually Doll Isamu being wielded as an emissary for an upcoming abduction attempt, Licca expounds upon the spectacle to Dai who has his doubts but decides to investigate the matter when Tomonori recommends against ruling it out.
24	"Here Comes Doll Izumi!" "Dōru Izumi Kenzan!" (ほらここに人形泉！)	16 March 1999
Incensed that an ordinary kid like Dai Takabayashi and that a curious college student like Rui Makiyama can derail her plans just as well as Doll Licca herself, Yae scolds Doll Isamu to get with the program; in contrast to Licca who is leaving the house to spend the day at the amusement park with Sumire and the boys.
25	"Catherine, The Enigmatic Exchange Student" "Nazo no Tenkōsei Kātorīnu" (キャサリン、ザ不可解な交換学生)	23 March 1999
Pull and Wire have had demonstrated the battle prowess of both Doll Licca and Doll Izumi enough times to realize that it is quite unpleasant.
26	"The Enigmatic Doll Izumi" "Dōru Izumi no Nazo" (ザ不可解な人形泉)	30 March 1999
As it has been hinted all along, Orie did not grow up in an indigenous Earth nuclear family and it is only after the parturition, by which Licca began her post-natal life that Orie has come upon her own prosperity; Orie having her own micro-economy does nothing to compensate the trauma of her father's sacrifice.
27	"Rika's Secret Revealed" "Akasareta Rika no Himitsu" (Rikaさんの秘密が明かされた)	6 April 1999
Hajime Kuboi jolts Rui out of his research about Devaul to exhort of him assistance in organizing the documents stored at the new observatory in the mountains.
28	"The Doll Kingdom of Illusions" "Maboroshi no Dōru Randō" (ザ人形イギリスの幻想)	13 April 1999
Considering the intrusion that imploded the previous attempt and how all the others have been foiled, Yae would be quite frustrated with Dr. Scarecrow as she delivers him an ultimatum before sending him on his way. While Dr. Scarecrow computes his next move, Dai's friends Hide and Tetsu are the vehicles by which the collateral damage caused by Devaul's occupation of the Doll Kingdom is manifesting itself unto the lives of Licca and her friends, who desperately struggle for some kind of healthy perspective of their recent encounter with Yae.
29	"Dad's Return" "Kaettekita Otōsan" (お父さんの戻る)	20 April 1999
Even though he has not really done it that much, Rui Makiyama has contributed to the derailing of enough abduction attempts for Yae to conclude that Licca's father Pierre will cause even more damage if allowed to join the battle in earnest even though Pierre's thoughts are more on seeing his daughter and how she has grown up in his absence. Later that evening, Nanae explaining Pierre the recent prologue of the Doll Kingdom becomes the forum by which Pull and Wire see the light about their previous actions while Pierre spends time with Licca gazing at the stars.
30	"The Reliable Bodyguards" "Tayoreru Bodīgādō" (信頼性の高い保護者)	27 April 1999
While it is not at all insignificant, the euphoric engagement she has enjoyed from Pierre is not enough to extinguish the underlying anxiety of his eternal absence, as Licca stares at him as if she were a love-struck adolescent before Nanae and Orie set her mind at ease prior to school commute. Dai and Tomonori comparing perspectives about Licca being much more lightweight, in spirit from Pierre's perennial presence vividly contrasts the purgatory of Pull and Wire agonizing how to proceed forward without Dr. Scarecrow, before Nanae challenges them prior to confirming the data they overheard.
31	"The Princess of the Demonic Realm" "Makai no Purinsesu" (悪魔のようなレルムのプリンセス)	4 May 1999
Yae leering at the sequestered Dr. Scarecrow before reaffirming acquisition of her grandniece Licca to the inert Doll Isamu becomes the genesis of Wire directing his sister Pull through bootstrapping themselves to begin the first day of their new lives as Licca's bodyguards now that Kayama family is confident of their sincerity even as their efforts do not always translate to success in real life such as when they prepare breakfast that morning to prepare Licca for the school commute with Dai.
32	"Taking Back Doll Isamu" "Dōru Isamu wo Torimodose" (戻る撮影人形勇)	11 May 1999
After she makes an impassioned argument for rescuing Doll Isamu in spite of it being a trap and not being able to reliably predict Doll Izumi's availability, Doll Licca sets off to the Doll Kingdom while Licca herself begins her school commute which becomes the forum for Dai to lead Sumire and Tomonori in reaffirming their vow to protect Licca before Catherine mentions the Doll Kingdom as she inquires the concourse of the four kids. Meanwhile, in the Doll Kingdom, Doll Licca finds that the desolation around her is the least of her worries when a group of knights converges on her. For Yae, Doll Licca also has an iconoclastic sense of humor that ultimately endows unto her the last laugh when she emancipates herself from her bindings to successfully steal back Doll Isamu along with both of his action accessories.
33	"Catherine's Secret" "Kātorinu no Himitsu" (キャサリンの秘密)	18 May 1999
Tomonori offering his perspective on the epilogue of the Calling Choker obfuscates Yae becoming quite frustrated that she is not getting a straight answer as she charges Misty investigative acquisition of the Choker.
34	"The Girl with the Bright Eyes" "Hikaru Me no Shōjō" (女の子とザ明るい目)	25 May 1999
After Dr. Scarecrow having once wielded dodgeball along with his rivalry with Souta Mizushima as a premise in one of his abduction attempts, they would think that Dai would learned to keep his zeal for sports in check. Dai's ego becomes the genesis of Misty's latest abduction attempt: disguising herself as the taciturn kindergarten girl, Mimi.
35	"Wedding Bells of Terror" "Kyōfu no Wēdingu Bērū" (結婚式ベルズのテロ)	1 June 1999
Yae charges Misty another abduction attempt obfuscates Sumire daydreaming about her own wedding day, before Dai arrives with the news of Mark paying the Kayama family a visit with his fiancée Yuri, to signal an interest in having a wedding during a trip down memory lane that gives Misty all the data she needs to wreak havoc as the Kayama family.
36	"The Mysterious Melody of Love" "Fushigi na Ai no Merodī" (ザ神秘的なメロディーの愛)	8 June 1999
Yae and Misty licking their wounds after the collaborative effort of Kayama-ke and its allies along with all three Doll Knights quickly gives way to Orie galvanizing herself for another fashion show which Licca recalls much to her delight before Pierre chimes in with the song he has been trying to finish. While he continues to exert an emphatic effort to bring it to a satisfactory conclusion, Pierre is flattered at the attention being showered unto his handiwork, as he explains Orie the prologue of how he came upon the melody who gives his personal perspective a huge shot in the arm.
37	"Two Doll Liccas" "Futari no Dōru Rika" (人形リカ回二)	15 June 1999
As naturally predicted, Misty's propensity for making crass comedy is no laughing matter for the none-too-pleased Yae who points to the lack of headway made in bringing Licca back to the Doll Kingdom. While Yae and Misty divide their energies between their frustration with each other and computing a technique to abduct Licca, the Kayama family is processing the nullification of Misty's previous abduction attempt the next morning to conclude that Pierre's song could even crash Devaul's central nervous system if played in its entirety.
38	"The Power of Dad's Song" "Otōsan no Kyōku no Chikara" (ザ能力でお父さんの歌)	22 June 1999
Undaunted at the previous abduction attempt imploding in on itself, Yae takes careful notes when the assassin operatives are repulsed by nothing more than Pierre playing his song in an attempt to figure how it ends. While Yae and Misty prosecute a divergent concourse over how best to proceed, Pierre reminisces over how he first came upon the song -- a clue thereof Rui has encountered on his journeys and decided for an investigative convergent vector.
39	"The Little Music Box" "Chiisana Orugōru" (ザ少し音楽の箱)	29 June 1999
While Yae and Misty comparing notes on the capabilities of Pierre's song deteriorates into a divergent concourse over whether to do anything to counteract it, Kayama family discusses Pierre's upcoming journey over dinner.
40	"Targeting Catherine" "Nerawareta Kātorīnu" (採石場キャサリン)	6 July 1999
Even though she prosecutes it with a magnificent degree of dexterity, Catherine still has yet to resolve her feelings about Franz charging her the lieutenant stewardship of wielding Doll Izumi to insure Licca's perpetual proximity to her allies and family government.
41	"Welcome Back, Scarecrow" "Okaeri, Sukeakūrō" (ようこそへ戻る,かかし)	13 July 1999
Misty exhorts Yae that she be bailed Dr. Scarecrow to aid her in her next abduction attempt. While Dr. Scarecrow reveals his new-found freedom caring nothing that Misty is wielding him for her own purposes, Pull and Wire are preparing to take Licca and her friends on an outing to collect bugs.
42	"The Sunday to Forget" "Wasurerareta Nichiyōbi" (日曜日は忘れて)	20 July 1999
Embittered by Dr. Scarecrow seeing the light at the most inopportune moment when Licca confirms what he already knows about himself, Yae is furious to see Licca yearning for Pierre's prompt return as she reminds Misty of the consequences for Licca continuing to remain free on Earth.
43	"The Treasure That Gives Courage" "Yūki ga Kureta Takaramono" (ザ宝こと与える勇気)	27 July 1999
Helping to foil the abduction attempts targeting her best friend Licca is something that Sumire has learned to deal with even if it has always been in synergy with Dai and Tomonori. Sumire does not have a whole lot of experience being the heroine on her own, aside from the previous abduction attempt that captured Catherine, who lost the Doll Izumi Calling Ring in the process.
44	"Misty Against the Doll Knights" "Misty tai Dōru Naitzū" (Misty反対ザ人形騎士)	3 August 1999
Misty is none too pleased at Yae reading her the riot act for her lack of progress in bringing Licca back to the Doll Kingdom. While Misty plots her next abduction attempt that she hopes will defeat the Doll Knights, Licca is comparing notes with Sumire and Dai over the Doll Knights' prospects of defeating Devaul when Tomonori arrives with a pair of photographs that could be argued as being a formal challenge from Misty that is to take place at the museum where Dr. Scarecrow began his abduction attempts.
45	"Doll Licca From Within the Light" "Hikari no Naka no Dōru Rika" (人形リカから内光)	10 August 1999
Even watching Misty make crass comedy of her collaborative inhibitory efforts with Doll Isamu and Doll Izumi to secure the Crown Princess' safety, Doll Licca searches for answers in the Doll Kingdom for how to defeat Devaul whose patience with Misty has been worn very thin while Dai ponders how to defeat a demon that has easily overpowered the Doll Knights before Sumire suggests learning to use magic.
46	"Summer Nightmares" "Natsu no Yoru no Akumu" (夏の悪夢)	17 August 1999
For the frustrated Devaul, re-assimilating Misty out of disgust because of her propensity for crass comedy insulting his expectations of her offers resolution toward neither capturing Licca nor convincing the Omniscient Owl to give up its bid to deep-freeze the Doll Kingdom; Yae and Devaul computing their next move quickly gives way to Rui getting a big break in his research about the Fantasy Civilization while Licca spends an oppressively torrid summer afternoon with Sumire and Tomonori at Dai's house catching cicadas in an attempt to cope with the summer heat.
47	"Heading to the Doll Kingdom" "Dōru Randō He no Tabidachi" (行くにザ人形イギリス)	24 August 1999
Yae effortlessly nullifies the battle utility of Doll Licca in her bid to successfully abduct Pierre, Licca is crestfallen as she computes how to secretly go to the Doll Kingdom by herself, a deviant diagnostic whose presence is not lost on Sumire nor Dai and Tomonori during class.
48	"The Wandering Iron Mask Appears!" "Nazo no Tetsu Kamen Arawaru!" (ザワンダーリング鉄仮面現る！)	31 August 1999
Upon seeing the desolation of the Doll Kingdom, the aggregate sentiment among the three kids is a broad spectrum running the gambit between excitement and anxiety along with guilt for Tomonori having been left behind; while the Doll Knights are reconnoitering the area after ordering Dai to cool his heels with the girls, Yae merely has an emphatic belly laugh as she orders her assassin operatives to extinguish the Doll Knights while she visits unto Licca a mind game using Pierre's voice. No matter how well she planned things, Yae has no available countermeasures for a passing knight that incinerates the bats dragging Licca into their cave.
49	"The God of the Doll Kingdom" "Dōru Randō no Kamisama" (ザ神のザ人形イギリス)	7 September 1999
Dai and Sumire are torn between relief that Licca is safe and suspicious astonishment of the Crown Princess' armored rescuer, a sentiment mirrored by the newly arrived Doll Knight. Yae fumes in frustration at another of her abduction attempts being nullified as she computes her next move, while Nanae and Orie set course for the forest where the Omniscient Owl has been trying to permanently deep-freeze the Doll Kingdom in a last-ditch effort to confine Devaul's destructive powers.
50	"Scarecrow, King of Magicians" "Maō, Sukeakūrō" (かかし、王手品師)	14 September 1999
Much to Tomonori's horror, the ironic crass comedy of successfully capitalizing upon Pull and Wire's anxiety for Dr. Scarecrow's safety is to arrive right near Yae who is monitoring Dr. Scarecrow's battle with the Doll Knights. The ultimate irony of the whole circus is that Tomonori-tachi proves itself exactly what the doctor ordered to derail Dr. Scarecrow slaying the Doll Knights who then rally their powers to destroy the dragon; the dragon now neutralized, Kayama family and Tomonori have a very sentimental reunion while Yae and Devaul fume angrily about the foiled operation backfiring.
51	"The Melody of Miracles" "Kiseki no Merodī" (奇跡のメロディ)	21 September 1999
Dai pulls Licca aside into a collaborative stowaway initiative with Tomonori and Sumire oblivious to the anxiety that it causes Orie when she discovers the four kids missing; in spite of the successful infiltration and the sentimental father-daughter reunion, Yae visits unto Kayama-ke a dynamic lesson in the folly of expecting to have their cake, when she sends a tentacle to capture Licca after wielding a garrison of armored assassin operatives to corner her in a dead-end ballroom. Even with the ballroom having a piano that Pierre promptly uses to play the song that easily crashed Misty's peripheral nervous system, it looks as if Devaul has ultimately won the war against Kayama family now that Yae is holding Licca captive. The epilogue to this nightmare depends entirely on the Omniscient Owl's perspective of Pierre's stormy weather musical efforts.
52	"Farewell, Rika-chan" "Sayōnara Rika-chan" (さようならリカ)	28 September 1999
Now emancipated from being Devaul's vassal, Yae delivers a syllabus of what will take place with Devaul in the near future and what now has to be done; as if to emphasize Yae's diatribe, an armored assassin operative walks into the room and Devaul flies along a descending hypotenuse sideswiping the castle in the form of an enormous dragon. It is that moment that the full scope of the chosen hybrid solution manifests itself: Licca assuming responsibility for the affairs of state in the Doll Kingdom after she has finished growing up alongside Dai.

== Theme songs ==
- '"Ne" (opening 1, Rooky)
- "Ashita no Kimi" (opening 2, Tomo Sakurai)
- '"Ne" (Cutey Techno Mix) (ending 1, Rooky)
- "Wow!" (ending 2, Rooky)
- "Love Wars Taisakusen" (ending 3, Rooky)
- "Sono Yume ha Nani Iro" (ending 4, Tomo Sakurai)

== See also ==
- Licca-chan
- YAT Anshin! Uchū Ryokō
