= The Life of Budori Gusuko =

- Theatrical release poster

Japanese name
- Kanji: グスコーブドリの伝記
Transcriptions
- Revised Hepburn: Gusukō Budori no Denki
- Directed by: Gisaburō Sugii
- Written by: Gisaburō Sugi
- Based on: The Life of Gusukoh Budori by Kenji Miyazawa
- Produced by: Yoshihiro Shimizu
- Starring: Shun Oguri; Shioli Kutsuna; Kuranosuke Sasaki; Hayashiya Shōzō; Ryūzō Hayashi; Tamiyo Kusakari; Akira Emoto
- Edited by: Masashi Furukawa
- Music by: Ryōta Komatsu
- Production company: Tezuka Productions
- Distributed by: Warner Bros. Pictures
- Release date: 7 July 2012
- Running time: 108 minutes
- Country: Japan
- Box office: US$2,868,421 (Japan)

The Life of Budori Gusuko (グスコーブドリの伝記, Gusukō Budori no Denki) (also known as A Biography of Gusuko Budori and The Legend of Budori Gusuko) is a 2012 Japanese animated film written for the screen and directed by Gisaburō Sugii. It is based on the 1932 children's novel of the same name by Kenji Miyazawa. It stars the voices of Shun Oguri as Budori Gusuko with Shioli Kutsuna, Kuranosuke Sasaki, Hayashiya Shōzō, Ryūzō Hayashi, Tamiyo Kusakari and Akira Emoto.

Like Night on the Galactic Railroad before it, the characters are depicted as anthropomorphic cats based on Hiroshi Masumura's manga adaptation of the novel. It is the second animated film adaptation of the story. The previous adaptation was released in 1994 as Kyōdō Eiga Zenkoku Keiretsu Kaigi, but that one features human characters instead.

North American anime distributor Sentai Filmworks have licensed the film for digital and home video release.

== Plot ==
Budori Gusuko and his family are living a happy life in a forest in the mountains of Ihatov. Here he spends his days going to school, playing with his sister Neri, and helping his parents. A year later, that peaceful life he enjoyed is changed completely. A sudden weather change comes upon the land of Ihatov, which causes everything to become cold and stormy. This cold weather leads to famine and drought all across Ihatov; leaving the villages hungry and desperate for salvation.

One night, Budori is awakened by the sound of his parent yelling. When Budori gets up to check on the situation, he finds his mother standing by an open door with the winter storm coming in, insinuating that his father ran off into the woods. The next day, distressed from her husband's departure, Budori's mother runs into the woods to look for him. This results in her leaving Budori and his sister, Neri, to fend for themselves. Alone and hungry, Neri's health begins to decline, causing her to become extremely fatigued all the time.

As Budori works on making a meal out of leaves for him and his sister, a nameless kidnapper comes and takes Neri away. He chases the kidnapper to try and save her but, being tired from the lack of nutrition, he trips and faints. He wakes up in an unfamiliar place only to find a stranger towering over him. He is then forced to work on a net used to raise silkworms in exchange for food. After completing his task, Budori is returned to the spot he was in before he was kidnapped, right outside his family home. With no other options and totally alone, he sets off down the mountain to find his sister.

While on his journey he stumbles upon a village where he meets a farmer that goes by the name of Red Beard. Red Beard takes him on as a helper. He stayed with Red Beard and his wife for about a year learning about farming until the drought hits their village, which causes Red Beard to let Budori go so his journey continues. On a train ride to his next destination, he wakes up in a strange place once again, filled with odd creatures. Here he runs into the stranger that took his sister. He chases after him only to arrive at a tall tower full of strange situations. When he makes it all the way to the top he sees that the stranger had already left the tower and runs back down to find him only to find a poster with his sister on it wearing a ballerina outfit. He is woken up from this dream world and arrives at the city where he searches for the university where Professor Kubo, a scientist that wrote the books that Budori studied while on the farm, teaches.

Budori takes notes and approaches Professor Kubo after a lecture, making a good impression on him. Because of this, Professor Kubo recommends Budori to work with scientists studying volcanos. Budori is determined to end the misery that the strange weather had brought upon his home of Ihatov. As he looks into the distance atop the volcano, he is transported back to the strange world, now on trial in court. The judge is the kidnapper of Budori's sister, Neri. When he is accused of trespassing and jumping between worlds, Budori becomes agitated, explaining that he only did this because his sister was kidnapped. The judge retaliates, asserting that his sister Neri was welcomed into the world, and wanted to come.

Budori returns to the real world once more, and is determined to stop the strange weather. He comes up with the idea to make the volcano erupt, in order to send enough carbon gas to warm up the air, causing the cold weather to stop. When his proposal is rejected, he returns to his room and contemplates that he will have to go through with his plan no matter the cost. This decision causes the kidnapper to come to him, who chooses to assist Budori in his selfless act. The kidnapper takes Budori to the volcano, where a sudden flash of light bursts and illuminates the surrounding area. Time passes, and with that, the land of Ihatov returns to its beautiful state from before the weather change.

== Voice cast ==
Cast
Role	Japanese	English
Narrator	Akira Emoto	Charles Campbell
Budori Gusuko	Shun Oguri	Derick Snow
Neri Gusuko	Shioli Kutsuna	Monica Rial
Professor Kuubou	Akira Emoto	Edwin Neal
Redbeard	Kobuhei Hayashiya	Lowell B. Bartholomee
Kotori	Kuranosuke Sasaki	
Nadori Gusuko	Ryuuko Hayashi	James Dean
Nakata	Mitsuru Miyamoto	
Budori's mother	Tamiyo Kusakari	Monica Rial
Schoolteacher	Houko Kuwashima	Amber Marie Davis
Redbeard's wife	Kazue Komiya	Monica Rial
Silk factory owner	Kenji Utsumi	Christopher Wehkamp
Observer		Jeff Collins
Timber mill manager	Mitsuaki Hoshino	
Redbeard's father	Sukekiyo Kameyama	Jason Douglas
Director Pennen		Charles Campbell

== Reception ==
The film won the Excellence Prize at the 16th Japan Media Arts Festival Awards.

== Soundtrack ==
Sony Records International was the main publisher for the tracks in the film. The soundtrack's composers were Ryouta Komatsu who is a famous Japanese bandoneón player alongside Kazumasa Oda, a famous Japanese singer-songwriter, and composer. There were about twenty-four performers in the creation of the original soundtrack for the film, which included Masaaki Goka, Hokuto Oka, Ryota Komatsu, Yuya Minorikawa, among others. The recording studio was Sony Music Tokyo.

The Japanese film consisted of about sixteen songs on the tracklist, which were:

1. "The Life of Budori Gusuko" Main Theme (Opening) (2:09) - 「グスコーブドリの伝記」メインテーマ (オープニング)
2. Life (5:13) - 暮らし
3. Cold-Weather Damage (8:08) - 冷害
4. Catch-The-Child (2:38) - 子取り
5. Factory Manager (1:16) - 工場長
6. Dream I (5:59) - 夢I
7. Red Whiskers I (3:09) - 赤ひげI
8. Red Whiskers II (1:38) - 赤ひげII
9. Red Whiskers III (4:25) - 赤ひげIII
10. Dream II (3:55) - 夢II
11. Dr. Kubo (3:42) - クーボー博士
12. Sanmutori Volcano (3:58) - サンムトリ火山
13. Carbonado Volcano (5:29) - カルボナード火山
14. Decision (4:47) - 決意
15. "The Life of Budori Gusuko" Main Theme (Ending) (4:25) - 「グスコーブドリの伝記」メインテーマ (エンディング)
16. For the Little Ones Being Born (Instrumental) (4:18) - 生まれ来る子供たちのために (インストルメンタル)

The list of songs includes the duration of the song itself in the film.

All of the music was composed and arranged by Ryouta Komatsu, except for the sixteenth track which was composed by Kazumasa Oda.

== Release ==
The original Japanese film was created in 1994, and then remade in Japanese in 2012, and translated into English while slated for a release date on Blu-ray disc of March 27, 2018. The English dubbed version also retains the original Japanese audio soundtrack which keeps the authentic feel of the film. The distribution of the English translated film was taken on by Sentai Filmworks.
