= Touch (manga) =

Japanese manga and anime series

- First tankōbon volume cover, featuring Kazuya Uesugi (top left), Minami Asakura (front), and Tatsuya Uesugi (right)

タッチ (Tatchi)
- Genre: Coming-of-age; Romantic comedy; Sports
- Manga
- Written by: Mitsuru Adachi
- Published by: Shogakukan
- Imprint: Shōnen Sunday Comics
- Magazine: Weekly Shōnen Sunday
- Original run: August 5, 1981 – October 12, 1986
- Volumes: 26
- Anime television series
- Directed by: Gisaburō Sugii (Note: Chief Director (総監督)); Hiroko Tokita (Note: Series Director (シリーズ監督)); Tsuneo Maeda (#1–27) (Note: Animation Director (アニメーション監督); Note: This credit refers to series direction, and not genga (key animation) correction.)
- Produced by: Yoshinobu Nakao (#1–79); Chihiro Kameyama (#80–101); Masamichi Fujiwara; Shigetsugu Tsuiki
- Written by: Yumiko Takahoshi (#1–56); Satoshi Namiki (#57–101)
- Music by: Hiroaki Serizawa
- Studio: Group TAC
- Original network: FNS (Fuji TV)
- Original run: March 24, 1985 – March 22, 1987
- Episodes: 101
Further information
Anime film
Touch: Sebangō no Nai Ace
Directed by	Gisaburō Sugii; Tsuneo Maeda
Produced by	Masamichi Fujiwara; Tadashi Oka; Yoshirō Kataoka
Written by	Yūjin Harada; Satoshi Namiki; Gisaburō Sugii
Music by	Hiroaki Serizawa
Studio	Group TAC
Released	April 12, 1986
Runtime	93 minutes
Anime film
Touch 2: Sayonara no Okurimono
Directed by	Gisaburō Sugii; Naoto Hashimoto; Tsuneo Maeda
Produced by	Masamichi Fujiwara; Tadashi Oka; Yoshirō Kataoka
Written by	Tomoko Konparu
Music by	Hiroaki Serizawa
Studio	Group TAC
Released	December 13, 1986
Runtime	81 minutes
Video game
City Adventure Touch: Mystery of Triangle
Developer	Compile
Publisher	Toho
Genre	Action
Platform	Famicom
Released	March 14, 1987
Anime film
Touch 3: Kimi ga Tōri Sugita Ato ni
Directed by	Gisaburō Sugii; Akinori Nagaoka; Tsuneo Maeda
Produced by	Masamichi Fujiwara; Tadashi Oka; Yoshirō Kataoka
Written by	Yumiko Takahoshi; Gisaburō Sugii
Music by	Hiroaki Serizawa
Studio	Group TAC
Released	April 11, 1987
Runtime	83 minutes
Live-action television film
Directed by	Yoshiharu Ueki
Produced by	Akifumi Takuma; Masaru Takahashi
Written by	Satoshi Kurumi
Studio	Fuji Television; as birds corp.
Original network	Fuji TV
Released	June 1, 1987
Runtime	84 minutes
Anime television film
Touch: Miss Lonely Yesterday
Directed by	Gisaburō Sugii; Akinori Nagaoka
Produced by	Hiroshi Yamashita; Masamichi Fujiwara; Fumio Ueda; Michiru Ōshima; Shigetsugu Tsuiki
Written by	Tomoko Konparu
Music by	Hiroaki Serizawa
Studio	Group TAC
Original network	Nippon TV
Released	December 11, 1998
Runtime	93 minutes
Anime television film
Touch: Cross Road
Directed by	Gisaburō Sugii; Akinori Nagaoka
Produced by	Hiroshi Yamashita; Haruo Sai; Fumio Ueda; Michiru Ōshima; Shigetsugu Tsuiki
Written by	Tomoko Konparu; Gisaburō Sugii
Music by	Hiroaki Serizawa
Studio	Group TAC
Original network	Nippon TV
Released	February 9, 2001
Runtime	93 minutes
Live-action film
Directed by	Isshin Inudo
Produced by	Kazunari Yamanaka
Written by	Yukiko Yamamuro
Music by	Suguru Matsutani
Studio	Shogakukan; Nippon Television; Toho; OLM, Inc.
Released	September 10, 2005
Runtime	116 minutes
- icon

Touch (Japanese: タッチ, Hepburn: Tatchi) is a Japanese high school baseball manga series written and illustrated by Mitsuru Adachi. It was serialized in Shogakukan's Weekly Shōnen Sunday from 1981 to 1986, with its chapters were collected in 26 tankōbon volumes.

The manga has been adapted into an anime television series – which was one of the highest-rated anime television series ever, three theatrical anime films which summarized the TV series, two anime television specials which take place after the events of the TV series, a live-action TV drama special, and a live-action film released in 2005.

Touch has sold over 100 million copies, making it one of the best-selling manga series of all time. In 1983, it was one of the winners of the Shogakukan Manga Award for the shōnen and shōjo categories, along with Adachi's other work Miyuki.

== Synopsis ==
Touch follows twin brothers Tatsuya and Kazuya Uesugi, along with their childhood friend and nextdoor neighbor Minami Asakura. Tatsuya, a naturally gifted athlete whose raw skills exceeds Kazuya's, has always allowed his hard-working younger brother to take the spotlight, but as the two of them near high school with Minami, Tatsuya realizes that perhaps he does not want to lose Minami to his brother after all. When Kazuya is struck in a traffic accident on the morning before the final game of the regional tournament, Tatsuya takes over his brother's position of ace pitcher, and utilizes his natural talent to complete his younger brother's goal of fulfilling Minami's dream of going to the Koshien.

== Characters ==
Tatsuya Uesugi (上杉 達也, Uesugi Tatsuya)
The elder of the Uesugi twins, seemingly selfish and lazy, he is actually very altruistic and reluctant to compete against others, especially his brother, Kazuya. A naturally talented athlete, he could be successful in baseball or most sports if he put in the effort but lets his younger brother succeed in his place. Like Kazuya, he loves Minami Asakura, the girl next door and their childhood friend, but initially cedes this relationship to his brother as well. When Tatsuya starts high school he nearly joins the baseball club but, when he hears that Minami has joined as the club manager, he cannot go through with it. Instead, Harada cons him into joining the boxing club with him. Voiced by: Yūji Mitsuya Played by:Shota Saito, Tatsuki Shibuya (young)
Kazuya Uesugi (上杉 和也, Uesugi Kazuya)
The younger of the Uesugi twins. Serious, hard working, and seemingly confident in everything he does, he seems to be the complete opposite of his older brother, Tatsuya. His pitching skills, perfect manners, and perfect grades makes him the idol of his parents, his schoolmates, and the neighborhood. He and everyone else sees himself and Minami as the perfect couple who will eventually marry. He strives to lead Meisei to win the prefectural tournament and advance to the national tournament at the Koushien, fulfilling a childhood promise to take Minami there. Though he projects an image of confidence he is actually always wary of his brother, knowing that, if Tatsuya tried, he could be a better athlete than he is and also steal Minami away. Voiced by: Keiichi Nanba Played by:Keita Saito, Itsuki Shibuya (young)
Minami Asakura (浅倉 南, Asakura Minami)
The Uesugi twins' neighbor and childhood friend. A responsible, attractive, athletic and intelligent student who also has to help her father with house chores and at the family coffee shop since her mother died at a young age. Her interests match up more with Kazuya, whom she cares for very deeply and supports completely on his road to the Koushien, but her heart mainly lies with Tatsuya. Like Kazuya, she sees Tatsuya's true potential and kind heart. Although she wishes to focus on being the baseball team's manager, she is eventually convinced to join the school's rhythmic gymnastics team and becomes a star athlete on her own. Voiced by: Noriko Hidaka Played by: Masami Nagasawa, Nako Yabuki (young)
Shingo Uesugi (上杉 信悟, Uesugi Shingo);Haruko Uesugi (上杉 晴子, Uesugi Haruko)
Tatsuya and Kazuya's parents. Always seen flirting and teasing each other despite the boys' presence. Mr. Uesugi sometimes puts on a straight face, usually to tell off Kazuya but soon turns back to teasing with his wife. Mrs. Uesugi is always seen smiling, sometimes giggling behind her hand. They live very carefree lives, often at the cost of their sons. (Shingo) Voiced by: Shigeru Chiba, (Haruko) Voiced by: Kazue Komiya Played by: Fumiyo Kohinata
Punch (パンチ, Panchi)
Punch is the Uesugi family Samoyed. She has puppies in part 2 of the manga. In the anime, Punch is a male dog and the puppies are instead adopted strays. Voiced by: Shigeru Chiba
Toshio Asakura (浅倉 俊夫, Asakura Toshio)
Minami's father and owner of the Minami Kaze ("South/Southern Wind") coffee shop. A widower, his wife died when Minami was very young but he remains faithful to her, never interested in remarrying. Despite this, he maintains an upbeat, positive attitude, looking forward to the day he believes Minami and Kazuya will marry. For a while, he also employs Tatsuya part-time and sees what a good worker he can be. Voiced by: Hiroshi Masuoka (voice actor) Played by: Shin Takuma
Kōtarō Matsudaira (松平 孝太郎, Matsudaira Kōtarō)
Meisei's portly catcher and clean-up hitter. He is Kazuya's best friend and is always paired with him. Initially, he is vehemently against Tatsuya joining the baseball team but eventually warms to him and becomes as close to him as he was to Kazuya. He occasionally expresses his jealousy of his friends' greater talent and ability to attract Minami and other girls.Voiced by: Shōzō Hayashiya (9th) Played by: Shinsuke Hiratsuka
Shōhei Harada (原田 正平, Harada Shōhei)
A big, intimidating schoolmate at Meisei. Introduced as a street brawler and bully, he actually proves to be kindhearted and very loyal to his friends, especially to Tatsuya and Minami, who he often gives sound advice to on various matters. He is a member, and eventual captain, of the boxing club and initially had Tatsuya join him, forcing him to toughen up and exercise. Voiced by: Banjō Ginga Played by: Rikiya
Akio Nitta (新田 明男, Nitta Akio)
A star slugger for Sumi Tech, the two time winner of the prefectural tournament and runner-up at Koshien. Akio became seriously devoted to baseball when he played against Kazuya in middle school. He has a crush on Minami and is a friend of Harada's from junior high, when they were both delinquents. After Kazuya dies he wants Tatsuya to take his place and show him "Kazuya's pitches" again. Voiced by: Kazuhiko Inoue Played by: Seiji Fukushi
Yuka Nitta (新田 由加, Nitta Yuka)
Akio's little sister, she is unusually close to her brother, and somewhat childish besides. She enters Meisei under the pretense of spying for her brother but really is there to try to seduce Tatsuya into being her boyfriend. She is very good at observing and analyzing baseball players. Despite her bratty behavior, she is also a very good student who scores even higher in history exams than Sakata.Voiced by: Miina Tominaga
Isami Nishimura (西村 勇, Nishimura Isami)
A somewhat conceited pitcher who refuses to acknowledge Tatsuya's skills and considers Akio Nitta to be his true rival. He has the best curve ball of any pitcher in their prefecture but no one will rise to his boasting. He also has a crush on Minami and constantly asks her out on dates. Due to overusing his curve ball he suffers damages his elbow and can no longer effectively pitch in his final tournament. Voiced by: Ryūsei Nakao
Shigenori Nishio (西尾 茂則, Nishio Shigenori)
Coach of the Meisei High team. He becomes ill in the brothers' senior year, and must stay in the hospital throughout the prefectural tournament. He assigns an interim coach, Eijiro Kashiwaba, to fill his position, touting him as a "kind, gentle man who loves baseball from the bottom of his heart", unaware that he had gotten him confused with his elder brother, the more popular Eiichirō. Coach Nishio returns at the end of the prefectural tournament. Voiced by: Kōichi Kitamura
Eijirō Kashiwaba (柏葉 英二郎, Kashiwaba Eijirō)
A brutal and spartan substitute coach that fills in while Coach Nishio is ill. Nishio meant to recommend his brother, Eiichirō, but either he or the school got the names mixed up. On his first day, he fires Minami as manager and ruthlessly beats Tatsuya. His training consists of further beatings, humiliation, and working the players beyond exhaustion. Most first year members of the team quickly resigned. He holds a grudge against Meisei's baseball team because of some events that occurred when he attended. He also compares the Uesugi twins' relationship to his own poor relationship with his own brother. Voiced by: Hideyuki Tanaka
Sachiko Nishio (西尾 佐知子, Nishio Sachiko)
Daughter of Coach Nishio, girlfriend of Kuroki, and early manager for the Meisei High team. Early on, she mistakes Tatsuya for Kazuya and recognizes his athletic ability, encouraging him to join the team as well. Voiced by: Hiromi Tsuru
Takeshi Kuroki (黒木 武, Kuroki Takeshi)
Upperclassman of Kazuya who initially scouts him and finds his pitching so incredible that he unselfishly gives up his position as Meisei's ace the following year. He moves to third base and becomes team captain. He and his girlfriend Sachiko see talent in Tatsuya as well as Kazuya, and try to get him to join the team, especially after Kazuya dies. Voiced by: Kaneto Shiozawa Played by:Fuuma Uehara
Takeshi Yoshida (吉田 剛, Yoshida Takeshi)
Transfer student to Meisei High who initially idolizes Tatsuya. He joins the team in their second year to be close to him and to try to gain self confidence. As his skills increase as a pitcher, being able to effectively mimic both Tasuya's fastball and Nishimura's curve ball with great control, he grows from confident to over-confident, conceited, and condescending. He challenges Tatsuya in a pitching contest for the ace position but before the duel can be held he has to move to South America due to his father's job. He returns in his third year as a cocky and ill-mannered pitcher of another team to play a game against Meisei. Voiced by: Yoku Shioya → Voiced by: Ryō Horikawa
Sakata (坂田)
Voiced by: Minoru Inaba
In the same class as Yuka Nitta and top student of their year. Despite being timid and not athletic, he joins the team and sticks with it even after the majority of the other new students quit. He falls in love with Yuka and tenaciously tries to win her affection.
Eiichirō Kashiwaba (柏葉 英一郎, Kashiwaba Eiichirō)
The brother of Eijirō, and the one who Coach Nishio thought he was hiring. He might not be the model baseball hero that many believe him to be. Voiced by: Kenji Utsumi, Jun'ichi Kanemaru (as second-year high school student)

== Media ==
=== Manga ===
Vol.14 of the 1999–2000 Touch bunkoban, showing Tatsuya and Minami

Written and illustrated by Mitsuru Adachi, Touch was serialized in Shogakukan's Weekly Shōnen Sunday magazine from August 5, 1981, to October 12, 1986. Its chapters were collected in 26 tankōbon volumes, released between December 15, 1981 and January 15, 1987. It has been reissued in 11 wide-ban volumes, 14 bunkoban volumes, and then again in 17 "perfect edition" volumes in the original magazine size with color inserts.

==== Volumes ====
No.	Japanese release date	Japanese ISBN
1	December 15, 1981	4-09-120651-4
2	March 15, 1982	4-09-120652-2
3	July 15, 1982	4-09-120653-0
4	October 15, 1982	4-09-120654-9
5	April 15, 1983	4-09-120655-7
6	May 15, 1983	4-09-120656-5
7	July 15, 1983	4-09-120657-3
8	September 15, 1983	4-09-120658-1
9	December 15, 1983	4-09-120659-X
10	May 15, 1984	4-09-120660-3
11	July 15, 1984	4-09-121131-3
12	September 15, 1984	4-09-121132-1
13	November 15, 1984	4-09-121133-X
14	December 15, 1984	4-09-121134-8
15	January 15, 1985	4-09-121135-6
16	April 15, 1985	4-09-121136-4
17	June 15, 1985	4-09-121137-2
18	September 15, 1985	4-09-121138-0
19	October 15, 1985	4-09-121139-9
20	December 15, 1985	4-09-121140-2
21	April 15, 1986	4-09-121451-7
22	May 15, 1986	4-09-121452-5
23	August 15, 1986	4-09-121453-3
24	October 15, 1986	4-09-121454-1
25	November 15, 1986	4-09-121455-X
26	January 15, 1987	4-09-121456-8

=== Other books ===
- Touch: Mitsuru Adachi Selected Original Works Collection (タッチ―あだち充自選複製原画集, Tatchi: Adachi Mitsuru Jisen Fukusei Genga Shū), November 1986, ISBN 4-09-199591-8
- Touch: The Last Scene Once Again (タッチ もうひとつのラストシーン, Tatchi: Mō Hitotsu no Rasuto Shīn), August 5, 2005, ISBN 4-09-408045-7

=== Anime series ===
The anime series of Touch premiered on March 24, 1985, and ran until March 22, 1987, comprising 101 episodes in total. It was one of the highest-rated anime television shows ever in Japan, with episodes consistently rated 30+ percentage points during parts of its run. In a 2005 poll by TV Asahi of the top 100 animated television series, Touch was ranked 9th.

==== Theatrical films ====
Three compilation films were created, presenting a condensed version the TV series. Touch: The Ace Without a Number on His Back (タッチ 背番号のないエース, Tatchi: Sebangō no Nai Ēsu) was released in Japan on April 12, 1986, by Toho as a double feature with Take It Easy starring Kōji Kikkawa. The film was directed by Gisaburō Sugii and written by Yūjin Harada, Satoshi Namiki, and Sugii. The film earned ¥900 million at the box office. The score for the film was composed by Hiroaki Serizawa. The opening and ending theme songs (respectively) were "The Ace Without a Number on His Back" (背番号のないエース, Sebangō no Nai Ēsu) and "Youth of Glass" (ガラスの青春, Garasu no Tīnneiji), both sung by 1980s pop duo Rough & Ready and composed by Serizawa. The themes were released together as a single, reaching #9 on the weekly Oricon charts and placing #63 for the year on the annual chart.

The second film, Touch 2: Goodbye Gift (タッチ2 さよならの贈り物, Tatchi 2: Sayonara no Okurimono), was released on December 13, 1986, by Toho as a double feature with Koisuru Onnatachi starring Yuki Saito. Touch 2 was directed by Hiroko Tokita and written by Tomoko Konbaru. The score was composed by Serizawa and featured song by the folk song group Bread & Butter.

The final film in the trilogy, Touch 3: Long After You've Passed Me By (タッチ3 君が通り過ぎたあとに -DON'T PASS ME BY-, Tatchi 3: Kimi ga Toori Sugita Ato ni -Don't Pass Me By-), was released by Toho in theaters in Japan on April 11, 1987, as a double feature with Itoshi no Erī (いとしのエリー) starring Onyanko Club member Sayuri Kokushō. Touch 3 was directed by Sugii and written by Yumiko Takahashi and Sugii. The score for the film was composed by Serizawa. The opening and ending themes (respectively) were "Long After You've Passed Me By" (君が通り過ぎたあとに -Don't Pass Me By-, Kimi ga Toori Sugita Ato ni -Don't Pass Me By-) and "For the Brand-New Dream", both sung by The Alfee. The two songs were released as a single that ranked #5 on the Oricon charts and #7 on The Best Ten music show.

==== Anime specials ====
There were two television animated sequel specials aired: one in 1998 and one in 2001. Touch: Miss Lonely Yesterday: From There to You... (タッチ Miss Lonely Yesterday あれから君は..., Tatchi Misu Rōnrī Iesutādei Are kara Kimi ha...) aired as part of the Friday Roadshow on Nippon TV on December 11, 1998. It was directed and storyboarded by Akinori Nagaoka and written by Tomoko Konparu. Serizawa reprised his role in writing the score. The opening and ending theme songs (respectively) were "Touch (Friday Night Version)" (タッチ（フライデーナイト・バージョン）, Tatchi (Furaidē Naito Bājon)) sung by Natsumi Sawai and Quick-Times, and "Hi Hi High" sung by Sachiko Kumagai.

Just over two years later, Touch Cross Road: The Whereabouts of the Wind (タッチ CROSS ROAD〜風のゆくえ〜, Tatchi Kurosu Rōdo: Kaze no Yukue) also aired as part of the Friday Roadshow on NTV on February 9, 2001. It was directed by Nagaoka, written by Konparu and Sugii, and the score was written by Serizawa. The theme song, "The Whereabouts of the Wind" (風のゆくえ, Kaze no Yukue), was sung by Satoru Sakamoto (best known for producing the group Dorothy Little Happy).

==== Home video release ====
A laserdisc boxset containing 26 discs of the series was released in Japan on December 10, 1995. The three theatrical films were released on VHS, and the series and all of the movies have been released on DVD and Blu-ray.

=== TV drama ===
The TV drama special aired on Fuji TV on June 1, 1987.

=== Live-action movie ===
A live-action movie of Touch was released in Japan on September 10, 2005; Keita Saito starred as Kazuya Uesugi, Masami Nagasawa as Minami Asakura, and Syota Saito as Tatsuya Uesugi.

=== Sequel ===
In 2012, Mitsuru Adachi began the Mix manga, and it received a 24-episode anime adaptation in 2019. It is set at Meisei High School thirty years after Touch.

=== Video game ===
City Adventure Touch: Mystery of Triangle (タッチ ミステリー･オブ･トライアングル, Touch: Mystery of Triangle) is a beat 'em up video game based on the manga Touch. It was developed by Compile for the Famicom and published by Toho on March 14, 1987.

== Reception ==
The manga has sold approximately 100 million copies.

In 1983, it was one of the winners of the Shogakukan Manga Award for the shōnen and shōjo categories, along with Adachi's other work Miyuki.

Kazuya Kamenashi of the J-pop group KAT-TUN was named after Kazuya Uesugi. Tatsuya Ueda, of the same band, was named after Tatsuya Uesugi.
