= Gisaburō Sugii =

Japanese anime director (born 1940)

- 杉井 ギサブロー
- Born: August 20, 1940 (age 86); Numazu, Shizuoka Prefecture, Japan
- Occupations: Anime director Kyoto Seika University instructor
- Years active: 1958–present
- Known for: Astro Boy; Touch; Night on the Galactic Railroad

Gisaburō Sugii (杉井ギサブロー or 杉井儀三郎, Sugii Gisaburō; born August 20, 1940) is a Japanese anime director and Nihonga artist. He is best known for his work as director of the Touch series, the movie adaptation of the Arashi no Yoru ni children's book series, and the movie Night on the Galactic Railroad. He is a member of the Directors Guild of Japan and the Japanese Animation Creators Association.

== Career ==
Sugii decided to become an animator after watching the film Bambi. He joined Toei Animation at the age of 19 after taking an entrance exam in 1958. He worked as an in-betweener on Hakujaden, Legend of the White Serpent soon after joining the studio. After becoming disillusioned with Toei due to complaints about production staff being unable to propose projects, he quit in 1961 and joined Mushi Pro on hearing that Osamu Tezuka was going to make anime.

1961 featured an exodus of animators from Toei to Mushi Pro following crackdowns on a strike organised by the Toei animator union. Sugii joined Mushi Pro along with his close friends from Toei, Rintaro and Yusaku Sakamoto. At the time the studio was still under construction and animators worked from Tezuka's house. Sugii helped refine Tezuka's rough animation into proper keys on the Tetsuwan Atom (Astro Boy) pilot film. On the Atom TV anime, Sugii was part of the initial rotation of six episode directors, which included Sakamoto, Eiichi Yamamoto, Sugii, Motoaki Ishii, Shûji Konno and Tezuka himself.

In 1964, Sugii along with Atsushi Takagi, Osamu Dezaki, Seiji Okuda and others left Mushi Pro and established studio Art Fresh. Art Fresh handled outsourced episodes of Tetsuwan Atom.

In 1967, Sugii made his directorial debut with Mushi Pro's television series Adventures of the Monkey King (Goku no Daibôken). His last work at Mushi Pro would be 1973's Belladonna of Sadness, on which he worked as animation director.

After promoting Manga Nippon Mukashibanashi, Sugii decided to spend some time away from the anime industry, setting off to travel the country from the mid-1970s to the early 1980s before finally returning to helm Night on the Galactic Railroad. He noted, "I could make Night on the Galactic Railroad precisely because I had traveled. My approach to visual expression greatly expanded after these experiences." Sugii's approach to the film was to treat "characters and landscapes as equals", exploring the main character Giovanni's emotions through shifts in the environment. While the original novel provides next to no description of the main characters' appearances, Sugii decided to depict them as anthropomorphic cats, as a means of preserving author Kenji Miyazawa's descriptive ambiguity of the characters.

== Awards and influence ==
Sugii received the 2018 Tokyo Anime Award Festival Achievement Award which honors "lifetime achievements in developing technical skills and cultivating new talent" and "invaluable contributions to the advancement of the animation industry on the whole".

Director Hiroyasu Ishida was his student at Kyoto Seika University.

== Works ==
Listed chronologically.

- Hakujaden, Legend of the White Serpent (1958, In-between animation)
- Astro Boy (1963–1966, production, animation director, key animation)
- New Treasure Island (1965, animation director)
- Gokū no Daibōken (1967, supervising director)
- Dororo (1969, supervising director)
- Lupin III Pilot Film (1969, key animation)
- A Thousand and One Nights (1969, key animation)
- Kori no Kuni no Misuke (1970, production)
- Dobutsumura no Shoboshi (1972, production)
- Kanashimi no Belladonna (1973, animation director)
- Tasukeai no Rekishi -Seimei Hoken no Hajimari- (1973, production)
- Jack and the Beanstalk (1974, director)
- Manga Nippon Mukashi Banashi (1975–1994, episode director, script)
- Son Gokū Silk Road o Tobu!! (1982, character design, production coordination)
- Nine (1983, director)
- Nine 2: Sweetheart Declaration (1983, director)
- Glass Mask (1984, chief director)
- Nine 3: Final (1984, director)
- Night on the Galactic Railroad (1985, director)
- Touch (1985–1987, supervising director)
- Touch: Sebangō no Nai Ace (1986, director, script)
- Touch 2: Sayonara no Okurimono (1986, supervising director)
- The Tale of Genji (1987, director)
- Hiatari Ryōkō! (1987–1988, director)
- Touch 3: Kimi ga Tōri Sugita Ato ni (1987, supervising director, script)
- Hiatari Ryoko! Ka - su - mi: Yume no Naka ni Kimi ga Ita (1988, supervising director)
- Sweet Spot (1991, director, script)
- Nozomi Witches (1992–1993, director, script)
- Street Fighter II: The Animated Movie (1994, director)
- Soar High! Isami (1995–1996, supervising director)
- Street Fighter II V (1995, director)
- Lupin III: The Secret of Twilight Gemini (1996, director, screenplay)
- Touch: Miss Lonely Yesterday (1998, supervising director)
- Super Doll Licca-chan (1998–1999, director)
- Super Doll Licca-chan: Licca-chan Zettai Zetsumei! Doll Knights no Kiseki (1999, director)
- Hidamari no Ki (2000, director)
- Captain Tsubasa: Road to 2002 (2001, supervising director)
- Touch: Cross Road (2001, supervising director)
- Hajime no Ippo: The Fighting! (2001, 2nd opening animation storyboards)
- Toki Kono Chikyu (Hoshi) no Mirai o Mitsumete (2003, director)
- Lament of the Lamb (2003, director)
- Space Pirate Captain Herlock: The Endless Odyssey (2003, storyboards)
- Phoenix (2004, TV series, script, storyboards)
- Arashi no Yoru Ni (2005, screenplay, director)
- Cinnamoroll: The Movie (2007, director)
- Tetsuko no Tabi (2007, opening animation storyboards)
- Tofu Kozo (2011, general director, screenplay)
- The Life of Guskou Budori (2012, director, writer, storyboards)
- Furusato meguri Nippon no Mukashibanashi (2017, supervisor)
- Rinshi!! Ekoda chan (2019, episode 2 director)
- MFINDA (TBA, director)

=== Books ===
- Street Fighter II Movie Storyboard Collection (STREET FIGHTER II MOVIE ストリートファイター II 絵コンテ集). Movic, 1994. ISBN 978-4896011210.
- Anime to Seimei to Hourou to (アニメと生命と放浪と 「アトム」「タッチ」「銀河鉄道の夜」を流れる表現の系譜). Wani Books, 2012. ISBN 978-4847060540.
- Night on the Galactic Railroad Setting Collection (アニメーション 「宮沢賢治 銀河鉄道の夜」設定資料集 増補新装版). Fukkan.com, 2018. ISBN 978-4835456126.
