= 1983 in anime =

The events of 1983 in anime.

== Events ==
The first original video animation (OVA), Dallos, is released.

== Accolades ==
- Ōfuji Noburō Award: Barefoot Gen

== Releases ==
Released	Title	Type	Director	Studio	Ref
January 9	Story of the Alps: My Annette	TV series	Kōzō Kusuba	Nippon Animation	
January 9	Mirai Keisatsu Urashiman	TV series	Seiji Okuda	Tatsunoko Productions	
January 10	Captain	TV series	Tetsu Dezaki	Eiken	
February 5	Aura Battler Dunbine	TV series	Yoshiyuki Tomino	Nippon Sunrise	
February 13	Urusei Yatsura: Only You	Film	Mamoru Oshii	Studio Pierrot	
March 1	Ai Shite Knight	TV series	Osamu Kasai	Toei Animation	
March 12	Crusher Joe	Film	Yoshikazu Yasuhiko	Studio Nue, Nippon Sunrise	
March 12	Doraemon: Nobita and the Castle of the Undersea Devil	Film	Tsutomu Shibayama	Shin-Ei Animation	
March 12	Harmagedon: The Great Battle with Genma	Film	Rintaro	Madhouse	
March 12	Ninja Hattori-kun NinxNin Furusato Daisakusen no Maki	Film		Shin-Ei Animation	
March 12	Parman: The Birdman Has Arrived!!	Film	Shin'ichi Suzuki	Shin-Ei Animation	
March 13	Dr. Slump and Arale-chan: Hoyoyo, Great Across-the-World Race	Film	Minoru Okazaki	Toei Animation	
March 19	Final Yamato	Film	Tomoharu Katsumata	Group TAC, Academy Productions	
March 26	Fushigi no Kuni no Alice	TV series	Shigeo Koshi, Taku Sugiyama	Nippon Animation	
March 30	Lightspeed Electroid Albegas	TV series	Kozo Morishita	Toei Animation	
March 31	Miyuki	TV series	Mizuho Nishikubo	Kitty Films	
April 1	Armored Trooper Votoms	TV series	Ryōsuke Takahashi	Nippon Sunrise	
April 2	Nanako SOS	TV series	Akira Shigino	Kokusai Eiga-sha	
April 3	Kinnikuman	TV series	Yasuo Yamayoshi, Takenori Kawada, Tetsuo Imazawa	Toei Animation	
April 3	Mīmu Iro Iro Yume no Tabi	TV series	Kazuyoshi Yokota	Nippon Animation	
April 4	Mrs. Pepper Pot	TV series	Tatsuo Hayakawa	Studio Pierrot	
April 4	Parman	TV series		Shin-Ei Animation. Tokyo Movie Shinsha	
April 4	Superbook II	TV series	Masakazu Higuchi	Tatsunoko Productions	
April 5	Galactic Whirlwind Sasuraiger	TV series	Takao Yotsuji	Kokusai Eiga-sha	
April 7	Eagle Sam	TV series	Hideo Nishimaki	DAX International Inc.	
April 9	Itadakiman	TV series	Hiroshi Sasagawa	Tatsunoko Productions	
April 9	Lady Georgie	TV series	Shigetsuga Yoshida	Tokyo Movie Shinsha	
April 29	Noel's Fantastic Trip	Film	Tsuneo Maeda	Iruka Office	
May 4	Nine	TV film	Gisaburō Sugii	Group TAC	
May 20	Stop!! Hibari-kun!	TV series		Toei Animation	
May 28	Golgo 13: The Professional	Film	Osamu Dezaki	Tokyo Movie Shinsha, Filmlink International	
June 5	Plawres Sanshiro	TV series	Kunihiko Yuyama	Asatsu DK, Kaname Production, Toho	
July 1	Creamy Mami, the Magic Angel	TV series	Osamu Kobayashi	Studio Pierrot	
July 1	Serendipity the Pink Dragon	TV series	Nobuo Onuki	Zuiyo Eizo, Fuji Eight Co., Ltd.	
July 3	Super Dimension Century Orguss	TV series	Noburo Ishiguro, Yasuyoshi Mikamoto	TMS Entertainment	
July 6	Psycho Armor Govarian	TV series	Seiji Okuda	Knack	
July 9	Dougram: Documentary of the Fang of the Sun	Film		Nippon Sunrise	
July 9	Xabungle Graffiti	Film	Yoshiyuki Tomino	Nippon Sunrise	
July 11	Cat's Eye	TV series	Yoshio Takeuchi	Tokyo Movie Shinsha	
July 16	Unico in the Island of Magic	Film	Moribi Murano	Madhouse	
July 21	Barefoot Gen	Film	Mori Masaki	Madhouse	
September 16	Miyuki	TV film	Kazuyuki Izutsu	Kitty Films, Toho	
September 16	Nine the Original	Film	Gisaburō Sugii	Group TAC	
October 2	Genesis Climber MOSPEADA	TV series	Katsuhisa Yamada	Artmic, Tatsunoko Productions	
October 7	Special Armored Battalion Dorvack	TV series	Hisataro Oniwa	Ashi Productions	
October 7	Taotao	TV series	Shuichi Nakahara, Tatsuo Shimamura	Mushi Production, Studio Cosmos	
October 10	Captain Tsubasa	TV series	Isamu Imakake	Tsuchida Pro	
October 10	The Green Cat	OVA	Osamu Tezuka	Tezuka Productions, Maki Productions	
October 20	Igano Kabamaru	TV series	Tameo Kohanawa	Group TAC	
October 21	Ginga Hyōryū Vifam	TV series	Takeyuki Kanda	Nippon Sunrise	
December 12	Dallos	OVA	Mamoru Oshii	Pierrot	
December 18	Nine 2: Sweetheart Declaration	TV film	Gisaburō Sugii	Group TAC	
	Daicon IV Opening Animation	Short film			
	Patalliro! Stardust Keikaku	Film		Toei Animation	

== See also ==
- 1983 in animation
