= Hồ Văn Trung =

Vietnamese writer (1885–1958)

Hồ Văn Trung 胡文中
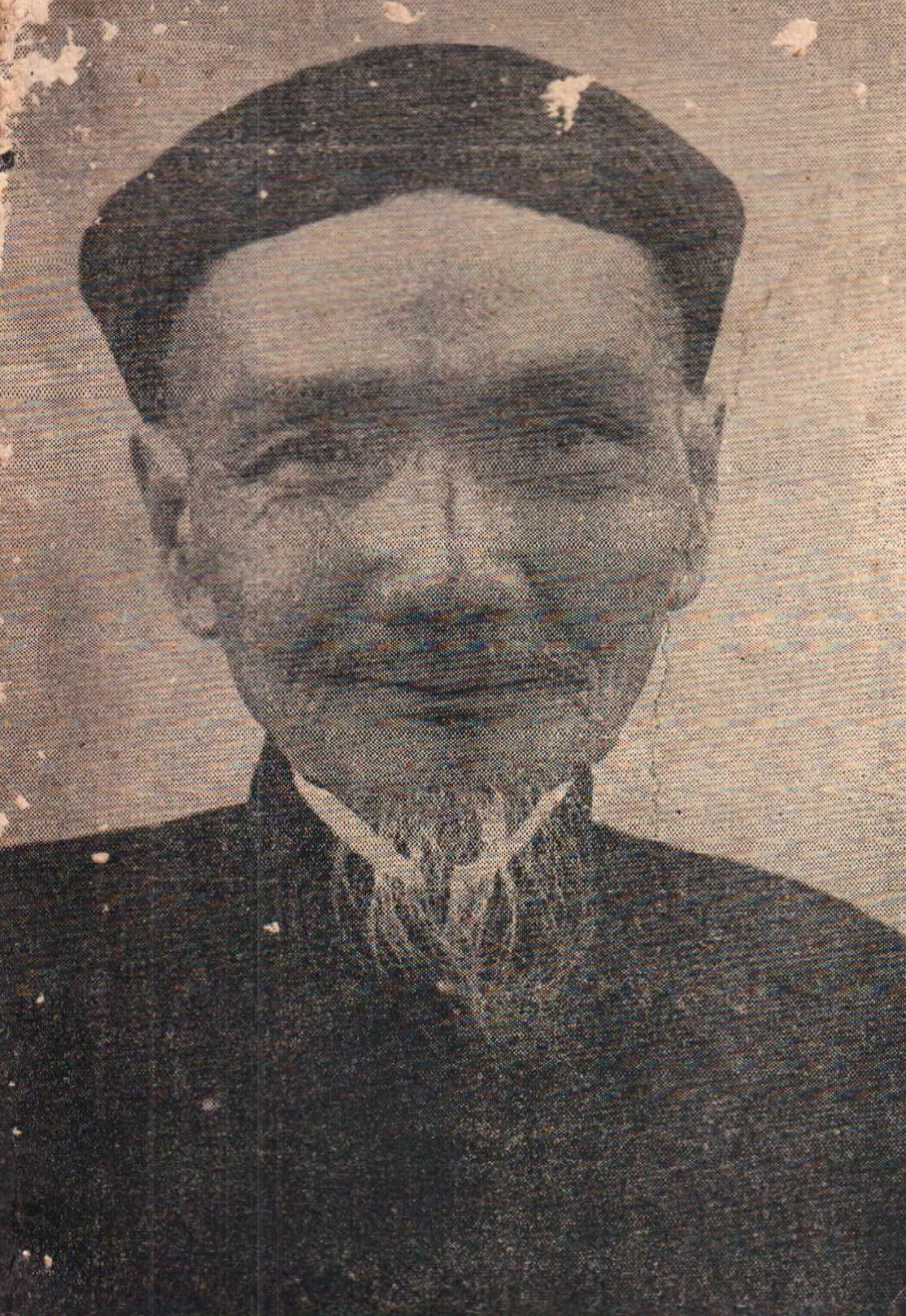
- Portrait.
- Born: 1 October 1885; Bình Thành village, Gò Công district, Cochinchina
- Died: 4 September 1958 (aged 72); Phú Nhuận district, Saigon, South Vietnam
- Occupations: Author, translator, journalist
- Spouse: Đào Thị Nhự
- Children: Hồ Văn Kỳ Trân (first son); Hồ Văn Vân Anh (first daughter)
- Writing career
- Pen name: Hồ Biểu Chánh
- Genre: Neoclassical
- Literary movement: Neoclassicism
- Website: hobieuchanh.com

Hồ Văn Trung (Chữ Hán: 胡文中, 1 October 1885 – 4 September 1958) was a Vietnamese writer.

== Biography ==
Hồ Văn Trung has a courtesy name Biểu Chánh (表政), pseudonym Thứ Tiên (次仙), with art name Hồ Biểu Chánh (胡表政). He was born on 1 October 1885 at Bình Thành village, Gò Công province of Cochinchina.

== Works ==
=== Translations ===
- Tân soạn cổ tích (Ancient tales retold, Saigon 1910)
- Lửa ngún thình lình (French literature, Saigon 1922)

=== Poems ===
- U tình lục (Sài Gòn – 1910)
- Vậy mới phải (Long Xuyên – 1913)
- Biểu Chánh thi văn (Tập i, ii, iii bản thảo)

=== Essays ===
- General Võ Tánh (Sài Gòn – 1926)
- Politic of education (Gò Công – 1948)
- Tùy bút thời đàm (Gò Công – 1948)
- Pétain cách ngôn Á đông triết lý hiệp giải (Sài Gòn – 1942)
- Gia Long khai quốc văn thần (Sài Gòn – 1944)
- Gia Định Tổng trấn (Sài Gòn)
- Chấn hưng văn học Việt Nam (Sài Gòn – 1944)
- Trung Hoa tiểu thuyết lược khảo (Sài Gòn – 1944)
- Đông Châu liệt quốc chí bình nghị (Bến Súc – 1945)
- Tu dưỡng chỉ nam (Bến Súc – 1945)
- Pháp quốc tiểu thuyết lược khảo (Bình Xuân – 1945)
- Một lằn chánh khí: Văn Thiên Tường (BX 1945)
- Nhơn quần tấn hóa sử lược (Gò Công – 1947)
- Âu Mỹ cách mạng sử (Gò Công – 1948)
- Việt ngữ bổn nguyên (Gò Công – 1948)
- Thành ngữ tạp lục (Gò Công – 1948)
- Phật tử tu tri (Gò Công)
- Nho học danh thơ (Gò Công)
- Thiền môn chư Phật (Gò Công – 1949)
- Địa dư đại cương (Gò Công)
- Hoàng cầu thông chí (Gò Công)
- Phật giáo cảm hóa Trung Hoa (1950)
- Phật giáo Việt Nam (1950)
- Trung Hoa cao sĩ, ẩn sĩ, xứ sĩ (1951)
- Nho giáo tinh thần (1951)

=== Memories ===
- Ký ức cuộc đi Bắc Kỳ (1941)
- Mấy ngày ở Bến Súc (1944)
- Đời của tôi: 1. Về quan trường, 2. Về Văn nghệ, 3. Về phong trào cách mạng
- Một thiên ký ức: Nam Kỳ cộng hòa tự trị (Gò Công – 1948)
- Tâm hồn tôi (Gò Công – 1949)
- Nhàn trung tạp kỷ (tập i, ii, iii Gò Công – 1949)

=== Dramas ===
  - Tình anh em (Sài Gòn – 1922)
  - Toại chí bình sinh (Sài Gòn – 1922)
  - Thanh Lệ kỳ duyên (Sài Gòn 1926 – 1941)
  - Công chúa kén chồng (Bình Xuân – 1945)
  - Xả sanh thủ nghĩa (Bình Xuân – 1945)
  - Trương Công Định qui thần (Bình Xuân – 1945)
  - Hai khối tình (Sài Gòn – 1943)
  - Nguyệt Nga cống Hồ (Sài Gòn – 1943)
  - Đại nghĩa diệt thân (Bến Súc – 1945)
  - Vì nước vì dân (Gò Công – 1947)

=== Short stories ===
  - Chị Hai tôi (Vĩnh Hội – 1944)
  - Thầy chùa trúng số (Vĩnh Hội – 1944)
  - Ngập ngừng (Vĩnh Hội)
  - Một đóa hoa rừng (Vĩnh Hội – 1944)
  - Hai Thà cưới vợ (Vĩnh Hội)
  - Lòng dạ đàn bà (Sài Gòn – 1935)
  - Chuyện trào phúng, tập I, II (Sài Gòn – 1935)
  - Chuyện lạ trên rừng (Bến Súc – 1945)
  - Truyền kỳ lục (Gò Công – 1948)

=== Novels ===
- Who can do (Cà Mau 1912, imitated André Cornelis of Paul Bourget)
- Ái tình miếu (Vĩnh Hội – 1941)
- Bỏ chồng (Vĩnh Hội – 1938)
- Bỏ vợ (Vĩnh Hội – 1938)
- Bức thơ hối hận (Gò Công – 1953)
- Cay đắng mùi đời (Sài Gòn – 1923, imitated Sans Famille of Hector Malot)
- Cha con nghĩa nặng (Càn Long- 1929)
- Ms Đào, ms Lý (Phú Nhuận – 1957)
- Captain Kim Quy (Sài Gòn – 1923, imitated The Count of Monte Cristo of Alexandre Dumas)
- Chút phận linh đinh (Càn Long – 1928, imitated En Famille of Hector Malot)
- Con nhà giàu (Càn Long – 1931)
- Con nhà nghèo (Càn Long – 1930)
- Cư kỉnh (Vĩnh Hội – 1941)
- Cười gượng (Sài Gòn – 1935)
- Đại nghĩa diệt thân (Sài Gòn – 1955)
- Dây oan (Sài Gòn −1935)
- Đỗ Nương Nương báo oán (SG 1954)
- Đóa hoa tàn (Vĩnh Hội – 1936)
- Đoạn tình (Vĩnh Hội −1940)
- Đón gió mới, nhắc chuyện xưa (Phú Nhuận – 1957)
- Two husbands (Sài Gòn – 1955)
- Two loves (Vĩnh Hội – 1939)
- Two wives (Sài Gòn – 1955)
- Hạnh phúc lối nào (Phú Nhuận – 1957)
- Kẻ làm người chịu (Càn Long – 1928)
- Crying alone (Càn Long – 1929)
- Lá rụng hoa rơi (Sài Gòn – 1955)
- Lạc đường (Vĩnh Hội – 1937)
- Lẫy lừng hào khí (Phú Nhuận – 1958)
- Lời thề trước miễu (Vĩnh Hội – 1938)
- Mẹ ghẻ con ghẻ (Vĩnh Hội – 1943)
- Một chữ tình (Sài Gòn – 1923)
- Một đời tài sắc (Sài Gòn – 1935)
- Một duyên hai nợ(Sài Gòn – 1956)
- Nam cực tinh huy (Sài Gòn – 1924)
- Nặng bầu ân oán (Gò Công – 1954)
- Nặng gánh cang thường (Càn Long-1930)
- Ngọn cỏ gió đùa (Sài Gòn – 1926, imitated Les Misérables of Victor Hugo)
- Người thất chí (Vĩnh Hội −1938, imitated Crime and Punishment of Fyodor Dostoyevsky)
- Nhơn tình ấm lạnh (Sài Gòn – 1925)
- Những điều nghe thấy (Sài Gòn – 1956)
- Nợ đời (Vĩnh Hội – 1936)
- Nợ tình (Phú Nhuận – 1957)
- Nợ trái oan (Phú Nhuận – 1957)
- Ở theo thời (Sài Gòn – 1935)
- Ông Cả Bình Lạc (Sài Gòn – 1956)
- Ông Cử (Sài Gòn – 1935)
- Sống thác với tình (Phú Nhuận – 1957)
- Tại tôi (Vĩnh Hội – 1938)
- Tân Phong nữ sĩ (Vĩnh Hội – 1937)
- Tắt lửa lòng (Phú Nhuận – 1957)
- Thầy Thông ngôn (Sài Gòn – 1926)
- Thiệt giả, giả thiệt (Sài Gòn – 1935)
- Tiền bạc, bạc tiền (Sài Gòn – 1925)
- Tìm đường (Vĩnh Hội – 1939)
- Tình mộng (Sài Gòn – 1923)
- Tơ hồng vương vấn (1955)
- Trả nợ cho cha (Sài Gòn – 1956)
- Trọn nghĩa vẹn tình (Gò Công – 1953)
- Trong đám cỏ hoang (Phú Nhuận – 1957)
- Từ hôn (Vĩnh Hội – 1937)
- Vì nghĩa vì tình (Càn Long – 1929)
- Vợ già chồng trẻ (Phú Nhuận – 1957)
- Ý và tình (Vĩnh Hội – 1938 – 1942)
- Người vợ hiền (?)

== In popular culture ==
=== Books ===
- Portrait of Hồ Biểu Chánh (Nguyễn Khuê, Saigon 1974)
- Page 56 of Dictionary of historical persons (Hanoi)

=== Films ===
- Ngọn cỏ gió đùa (1989)
- Con nhà nghèo (1998)
- Ân oán nợ đời (2002)
- Nợ đời (2004)
- Cay đắng mùi đời (2007)
- Tại tôi (2009)
- Tân Phong nữ sĩ (2009)
- Tình án (2009)
- Khóc thầm (2010)
- Lòng dạ đàn bà (2011)
- Ngọn cỏ gió đùa (2013)
- Lời sám hối (2014)
- Hai khối tình (2015)
- Con nhà giàu (2015)
