= 1983 in animation =

Events in 1983 in animation.

== Events ==
=== February ===
- February 3: The first Dutch animated feature film Als Je Begrijpt Wat Ik Bedoel (The Dragon That Wasn't (Or Was He?)) is first released. It is based on Marten Toonder's comics series Tom Poes and produced by Rob Houwer and Topcraft.
- February 21: The Peanuts TV special Is This Goodbye, Charlie Brown? premieres on CBS.

=== March ===
- March 11: Winnie the Pooh and a Day for Eeyore premieres, produced by the Walt Disney Company.
- March 19: Tomoharu Katsumata's Final Yamato, the longest animated feature film ever at 163 minutes, is first released.
- March 31: Monty Python's Meaning of Life premieres which has animated opening credits and intermezzos by Terry Gilliam.

=== April ===
- April 4: The first episode of Mrs. Pepperpot is broadcast, based on the Norwegian children's book series of the same name by Alf Prøysen.
- April 11: 55th Academy Awards: Tango by Zbigniew Rybczyński wins the Academy Award for Best Animated Short Film.
- April 15: Clive A. Smith's Rock & Rule is first released, the first film produced by the Canadian animation company Nelvana. MGM/UA picked up the film, reducing the mature content and changing the script for Omar to make it more fitting for the United States release. The release for its Canadian home country premieres uncut four months later.
- April 18: Disney Channel is launched.

=== May ===
- May 16: The Peanuts TV special It's an Adventure, Charlie Brown premieres on CBS.
- May 30: The Peanuts TV special What Have We Learned, Charlie Brown? premieres on CBS. The special takes after the events of the 1980 Peanuts film Bon Voyage, Charlie Brown (and Don't Come Back!!).

=== July ===
- July 21: Mori Masaki's Barefoot Gen, based on the manga series by Keiji Nakazawa, is first released.

=== August ===
- August 5:
  - Friz Freleng and Phil Monroe's anthological Looney Tunes film Daffy Duck's Fantastic Island premieres in theaters. Despite it being directed by Freleng, it also contained shorts directed by Robert McKimson & Chuck Jones.
  - The film Twice Upon a Time premieres. There's been production battles between John Korty’s family-friendly version and Marshall Efron's edgy version, as Korty urged distributors to release his version instead of Efron's.
- August 26: Ralph Bakshi and Tom Tataranowicz's Fire and Ice premieres.

=== September ===
- September 1: The first episode of Donald Duck Presents is broadcast.
- September 5: The first episode of He-Man and the Masters of the Universe is broadcast.
- September 10:
  - The first episode of Rubik, the Amazing Cube, an animated series based on the popularity of the Rubik's Cube is broadcast but will be cancelled after only one season.
  - The first episode of The Littles is broadcast.
- September 12:
  - The first episode of G.I. Joe: A Real American Hero is broadcast.
  - The first episode of Henry's Cat is broadcast.
  - The first episode of Inspector Gadget is broadcast.
- September 17:
  - The first episode of Alvin and the Chipmunks is broadcast.
  - The first episode of Mr. T, an animated series based on and starring Mr. T, is broadcast. It became a cult classic years later.
  - The first episode of The Charlie Brown and Snoopy Show is broadcast. The series was a promotional failure. Its second season was only limited to five episodes, after its two-year hiatus in 1985.
  - The first episode of Saturday Supercade airs. This marks the animated debut of Mario and Donkey Kong. The series also features animated versions of the characters from arcade games.
  - The first episode of Dungeons & Dragons is broadcast. This marks one of the first animated series to depict high-level violence after a long-term period of television censorship. The innovation was controversial at the time.

=== October ===
- October 3: The first episode of Bananaman is broadcast, based on Steve Bright, Dave Donald and John Geering's eponymous comic strip.
- October 28: Garfield's second TV special Garfield on the Town premieres on CBS.

=== December ===
- December 16: The first Mickey Mouse short in 30 years, Mickey's Christmas Carol is first released in theaters.

=== Specific date unknown ===
- Jan Švankmajer releases Dimensions of Dialogue.
- The first episode of Hanna-Barbera's Lucky Luke, based on the eponymous Belgian comic strip by Morris, is broadcast.

== Films released ==
- January 1 - Legend of Sealed Book (China)
- January 3 - Eunhajeonseol Tera (South Korea)
- January 13 - Sherlock Holmes and the Sign of Four (Australia)
- January 14 - Sherlock Holmes and the Valley of Fear (Australia)
- January 15 - Sherlock Holmes and a Study in Scarlet (Australia)
- January 16 - Sherlock Holmes and the Baskerville Curse (Australia)
- January 21 - Miraesonyeon Kunta Beomyuda 5000 Nyeon (South Korea)
- January 26 - Revenge of the Humanoids (France)
- February 3 - The Dragon That Wasn't (Or Was He?) (Netherlands)
- February 9 - I am a Dog: The Life of Don Matsugoro (Japan)
- February 13 - Urusei Yatsura: Only You (Japan)
- February 19 - Haejeotamheomdae Marin X (South Korea)
- February 24 - Chohabgeum roboteu SOLAR I.II.III (South Korea)
- March 12:
  - Crusher Joe (Japan)
  - Doraemon: Nobita and the Castle of the Undersea Devil (Japan)
  - Harmagedon: Genma Wars (Japan)
- March 13:
  - Aesop's Fables (Japan)
  - Dr. Slump and Arale-chan: Hoyoyo! The Great Race Around the World (Japan)
- March 19 - Final Yamato (Japan)
- April 3 - Dot and the Bunny (Australia)
- April 29:
  - Noel's Fantastic Trip (Japan)
  - Pro Yakyū o 10-bai Tanoshiku Miru Hōhō (Japan)
- May 4 - Nine (Japan)
- May 9 - John the Boaster (Hungary)
- May 16 - It's an Adventure, Charlie Brown (United States)
- May 28 - Golgo 13: The Professional (Japan)
- July - Abra Cadabra (Australia)
- July 9:
  - Document: Taiyō no Kiba Daguramu (Japan)
  - Xabungle Graffiti (Japan)
- July 10 - Patalliro! Stardust Project (Japan)
- July 16:
  - Hwanggeum-ui pal (South Korea)
  - Unico in the Island of Magic (Japan)
- July 21:
  - Barefoot Gen (Japan)
  - Space Gundam V (South Korea)
- July 30 - Protectors of Universe (South Korea)
- August - The Knight of the Red Heart (Poland)
- August 4 - Old Master Q and San T (Hong Kong)
- August 5:
  - Daffy Duck's Fantastic Island (United States)
  - Twice Upon a Time (United States)
- August 12:
  - Computer Haekjeonham Pokpadaejakjeon (South Korea)
  - Rock & Rule (Canada)
- August 13 - Hwanggeumnyeonpilgwa Gaegujangi Oegyesonyeon (South Korea)
- August 21 - A Time Slip of 10000 Years: Prime Rose (Japan)
- August 26 - Fire and Ice (United States)
- September 3 - Water Spider-Wonder Spider (Hungary)
- September 12 - Doctor Mambo & the Phantom Thief Jibako: With Love from Space (Japan)
- September 16:
  - Miyuki (Japan)
  - Nine: The Original (Japan)
- September 30 - The Daltons on the Loose (France)
- October 1 - A Disney Halloween (United States)
- November 24 - The Legend of Hiawatha (United States and Canada)
- December 3 - A Disney Channel Christmas!!!! (United States)
- December 13 - The Raccoons and the Lost Star (Canada)
- December 17:
  - Cheol-in samchongsa (South Korea)
  - Space Champion Hong Gil-dong (South Korea)
  - The Voyages of Gulliver (Spain)
- December 18 - Nine 2: Sweetheart Declaration (Japan)
- December 21 - David & Goliath (South Korea)
- December 23 - The Princess and the Robot (Brazil)
- December 27 - The Wind in the Willows (United Kingdom)
- Specific date unknown:
  - Boi Aruá (Brazil)
  - Dokgotak – Throw It Towards the Sun (South Korea)
  - Elpidio Valdés Against Dollar and Cannon (Cuba)
  - The Boulugres (France)
  - Straszydła (Poland)
  - Syupeo Taitan 15 (South Korea)
  - UFO Reul Tagoon Oegyein Wangja (South Korea)

== Television series ==
- January 9: Future Police Urashiman and Story of the Alps: My Annette debut on Fuji TV.
- January 10 - Captain debuts on Nippon TV.
- January 21 - Aku Dai Sakusen Srungle debuts on TV Asahi.
- February 5:
  - Aura Battler Dunbine debuts on Nagoya TV.
  - The Dukes debuts on CBS.
- February 17 - Gran debuts on BBC.
- March 1 - Ai Shite Knight debuts on TV Asahi.
- March 30 - Albegas debuts on MegaTON (TV Tokyo).
- March 31 - Miyuki debuts on Fuji TV.
- April 1 - Armored Trooper Votoms debuts on MegaTON (TV Tokyo).
- April 2 - Nanako SOS debuts on Fuji TV.
- April 3:
  - Kinnikuman debuts on Nippon TV.
  - Mîmu Iro Iro Yume No Tabi debuts on TBS.
- April 4:
  - Mrs. Pepper Pot debuts on NHK General TV.
  - Superbook II debuts on TV Tokyo.
- April 5 - Sasuraiger debuts on TV Tokyo.
- April 7 - Eagle Sam debuts on Tokyo Broadcasting System Television.
- April 9:
  - Itadakiman debuts on Fuji TV.
  - Lady Georgie debuts on TV Asahi.
- April 18 - Good Morning, Mickey! debuts on The Disney Channel.
- May 26 - Bemubemu Hunter Kotengu Tenmaru debuts in syndication.
- June 5 - Plawres Sanshiro debuts on TBS.
- July 1:
  - Creamy Mami, the Magic Angel debuts on Nippon TV.
  - Serendipity the Pink Dragon debuts on NTV.
- July 3 - The Super Dimension Century Orguss debuts on MBS.
- July 5 - Moschops debuts on ITV.
- July 6 - Psycho Armor Govarian debuts on TV Tokyo.
- July 11 - Cat's Eye debuts on Nippon TV.
- August 1 - Around the World with Willy Fog debuts on ANTENNE 2 and TVE1.
- September 1 - Donald Duck Presents debuts on Disney Channel.
- September 10:
  - The Monchhichis debuts on ABC.
  - The Littles debuts on ABC, Canal+, and TF1.
  - The New Scooby and Scrappy-Doo Show debuts on ABC.
- September 12:
  - G.I. Joe: A Real American Hero debuts in syndication.
  - Henry's Cat debuts on BBC1.
  - Inspector Gadget debuts in syndication (United States) and on FR3 (France).
- September 17:
  - Alvin and the Chipmunks, Dungeons & Dragons, Saturday Supercade, The Biskitts, The Charlie Brown and Snoopy Show, and Mr. T debut on NBC.
  - Rubik, the Amazing Cube debuts on ABC.
- September 26 - He-Man and the Masters of the Universe debuts in syndication.
- October 2 - Genesis Climber MOSPEADA debuts on Fuji TV.
- October 3:
  - Bananaman debuts on BBC.
  - Taotao debuts in syndication.
  - Terrahawks debuts on ITV.
- October 4 - The Adventures of Portland Bill debuts on ITV Network.
- October 7 - Special Armored Battalion Dorvack debuts on Fuji TV.
- October 10: Fushigi no Kuni no Alice and Manga Aesop Monogatari debut on TV Tokyo.
- October 13 - Captain Tsubasa debuts on TV Tokyo.
- October 20 - Igano Kabamaru debuts on Nippon Television.
- October 21 - Ginga Hyōryū Vifam debuts on JNN (MBS TV).
- November 8 - Koshika Monogatari debuts on NHK.
- Specific date unknown - Victor & Maria debuts on CITV.

== Births ==
=== January ===
- January 2: Anthony Carrigan, American actor (voice of Vladimir Putin in Animaniacs, Mr. Tyrant in Captain Fall).
- January 7: Brett Dalton, American actor (voice of Brick in Milo Murphy's Law, Parasite in Superman: Man of Tomorrow, Bat Lash in Justice League: Warworld, Talon in the Jake and the Never Land Pirates episode "Flight of the Feathers").
- January 14: Anne Walker Farrell, American animator (Re-Animated, Slacker Cats, Christmas Is Here Again, Monster High: New Ghoul at School, Good Vibes, Greatest Party Story Ever), storyboard artist (Random! Cartoons, The Mr. Men Show, Wow! Wow! Wubbzy!, The Ricky Gervais Show, BoJack Horseman, Mighty Magiswords, HouseBroken), writer (The Mr. Men Show) and director (BoJack Horseman, Final Space, Duncanville).
- January 17: Rickey D'Shon Collins, American voice actor (voice of Vince LaSalle in Recess, Tucker Foley in Danny Phantom, Bosworth in Once Upon a Forest, Byron / Boom in the Static Shock episode "Brother-Sister Act").

=== February ===
- February 4:
  - Hannibal Buress, American comedian, actor, writer, and producer (voice of Matt Attack, DJ Don Jose and Street Troll in China, IL, Crisco in Chozen, Mom and Momma Lucas in Lucas Bros. Moving Co., the Nerd King in Nerdland, Edward the Birthday Dad in The Angry Birds Movie, Buddy in The Secret Life of Pets and The Secret Life of Pets 2, Mister Terrific in Justice League Action, Hefty Jeff in the Bob's Burgers episode "My Big Fat Greek Bob", Flame Prince in the Adventure Time episode "Five Short Tables", Miles in the BoJack Horseman episode "The Judge", Finch in The Simpsons episode "The Road to Cincinnati").
  - Lauren Ash, Canadian actress (voice of Scorpia in She-Ra and the Princesses of Power, Diane Dunbrowski in Chicago Party Aunt, Beryl Chatterley in Kiff, Officer Karen in the It's Pony episode "10 Minute Ticket").
- February 23:
  - Aziz Ansari, American actor and comedian (voice of Mub in Epic, Squint in Ice Age: Continental Drift, DMO in Adventure Time, Billy Billions in Ben 10: Omniverse).
  - Emily Blunt, English actress (voice of Tempest Shadow in My Little Pony: The Movie, Juliet in Gnomeo & Juliet and Sherlock Gnomes, Naoko Satomi in The Wind Rises, Zoe Huntington in Animal Crackers, Juliet in The Simpsons episode "Lisa the Drama Queen").
- February 27: Kate Mara, American actress (voice of Chrysalis Tate in Moonbeam City, Perl in Tron: Uprising).

=== March ===
- March 1: Lupita Nyong'o, Kenyan-Mexican actress (voice of Maz Kanata in the Star Wars franchise, Asha in Big Mouth and Human Resources, Roz in The Wild Robot).
- March 7: Greta Lee, American actress (voice of Lyla in Spider-Man: Into the Spider-Verse and Spider-Man: Across the Spider-Verse, Bubbles in HouseBroken, Lilypad in Toy Story 5).
- March 12: Ron Funches, American actor and comedian (voice of Cooper in the Trolls franchise, Elliot Mothman in Inside Job, Jerry Shaw in The Great North, King Shark in Harley Quinn, Shag Rugg in Jellystone!, Rock in Rock Paper Scissors, Fox in Final Space, Sparko in OK K.O.! Let's Be Heroes, Sharzod in Home: Adventures with Tip & Oh, Bloofy in Inside Out 2).
- March 17: Leasa Epps-Eisele, American background artist (The Simpsons, Futurama) and texture painter (Barnyard).
- March 28: Natalie Lander, American actress (voice of Mirta in Winx Club, Liz Allan in Spider-Man, Stargirl in Justice League Action, Goldie in Goldie & Bear, Brigid in Craig of the Creek, Gigi Soda in the Animaniacs episode "Soda-pressed").
- March 31: Ashleigh Ball, Canadian voice actress and singer (voice of Applejack and Rainbow Dash in My Little Pony: Friendship is Magic, Plum Pudding in Strawberry Shortcake's Berry Bitty Adventures, Blythe Baxter in Littlest Pet Shop, Talia in LoliRock, Jet Propulsion in Ready Jet Go!, Mary Test in Johnny Test, Pinky in Pac-Man and the Ghostly Adventures, Kirstee in season two of Bratz, Tails in Sonic Prime, Black Widow in Iron Man: Armored Adventures).

=== April ===
- April 1: Matt Lanter, American actor (voice of Anakin Skywalker in the Star Wars franchise, Aquaman in the DC Animated Movie Universe, Harry Osborn and Flash Thompson in Ultimate Spider-Man, Winter Soldier in the Avengers Assemble episode "Vibranium Curtain").
- April 4: Eric André, American actor and comedian (voice of Luci in Disenchantment, Azizi in The Lion King, Mark Bowman in The Mitchells vs. the Machines, Darius in Sing 2, John Dory in Trolls Band Together).
- April 9: Allyn Rachel, American actress (voice of Bee in Bee and PuppyCat).
- April 11: Jamie Chung, American actress (voice of Go Go Tomago in Big Hero 6 and Big Hero 6: The Series, Death in DC Showcase: Death, Jade Nguyen in Batman: Soul of the Dragon, Rose Trefgarne in Sherwood, Misa in the Star Wars: Visions episode "Akakiri").
- April 20: Tan France, British-American fashion designer and television personality (voice of Sir Benedict in Princess Power, himself in the Big Mouth episode "Disclosure the Movie: The Musical!").

=== May ===
- May 6: Gabourey Sidibe, American actress (voice of Francis in StuGo, Keisha in the Glenn Martin, DDS episode "Date with Destiny", Tamara in the BoJack Horseman episode "The Old Sugarman Place").
- May 8: Elyes Gabel, English actor (voice of Thomas Kallor / Star Boy in Justice League vs. the Fatal Five).

=== June ===
- June 8: Mamoru Miyano, Japanese actor (voice of Light Yagami in Death Note, Cilan in Pokémon, Osamu Dazai in Bungo Stray Dogs, Ryuji Sakamoto in Persona 5: The Animation).
- June 9: Alexia Khadime, English actress and singer (voice of Sardonyx in Steven Universe).
- June 16: Olivia Hack, American actress (voice of Rhonda Lloyd in Hey Arnold!, Ty Lee in Avatar: The Last Airbender, Katooni in Star Wars: The Clone Wars, Mao Jahana in Blood+, Cloe in Bratz, Emily in the Ben 10: Ultimate Alien episode "It's Not Easy Being Gwen").
- June 19: Lisa Hanawalt, American illustrator, writer and cartoonist (BoJack Horseman, creator of Tuca & Bertie).
- June 23:
  - Laura Post, American voice actress and director (voice of Diana Cavendish in Little Witch Academia, Rebecca Forester in Yo-kai Watch, Tellu and Queen Nehellenia in the Viz Media dub of Sailor Moon, Commander Trugg in Voltron: Legendary Defender, Big Barda in Justice League Action).
  - Kathreen Khavari, American actress (voice of Kamala Khan / Ms. Marvel in Avengers Assemble, Spider-Man, and Marvel Rising, Badyah in Dead End: Paranormal Park, Twitch in Transformers: EarthSpark).

=== July ===
- July 1: Lynsey Bartilson, American actress (voice of Tuesday X in The X's, Malika in the Fillmore! episode "Red Robins Don't Fly").
- July 5: Jeff Mednikow, American animator, storyboard artist (Class of 3000, Wow! Wow! Wubbzy!, The Cleveland Show), writer, director and producer (Teen Titans Go!, Be Cool, Scooby-Doo!).
- July 9: Janna Michaels, American former child actress (voice of Molly Cunningham in TaleSpin).
- July 27: Heidi Gardner, actress, comedian, and writer (voice of Tuva Van Void in Alien News Desk, Becca in Close Enough, episode "Houseguest From Hell", Last Baker in Puss in Boots: The Last Wish, Eli's mom in Leo).
- July 29: Tania Gunadi, Indonesian-American actress and producer (voice of Miko Nakadai in Transformers: Prime, Sam Lastname in Sanjay and Craig, Sashi Kobayashi in Penn Zero: Part-Time Hero, Lady Shiva in DC Super Hero Girls, Miss Elodie in Sofia the First, Kendra in Rise of the Teenage Mutant Ninja Turtles, Iso in the Avengers Assemble episode "The Mighty Avengers", Pliny in StuGo).
- July 30: Abel Góngora, Spanish animator (Devilman crybaby, Lu Over the Wall).

=== August ===
- August 3: Sara Chase, American singer and actress (voice of Sasha Reed in The Simpsons episode "The Star of the Backstage").
- August 4: Greta Gerwig, American actress and filmmaker (voice of Pony Merks in China, IL, Tracy Walker in Isle of Dogs, herself in The Ghost and Molly McGee episode "Hooray for Mollywood!").
- August 9: Ashley Johnson, American voice actress (voice of Gretchen Grundler in Recess, Terra in Teen Titans and Teen Titans Go!, Jinmay in Super Robot Monkey Team Hyperforce Go!, Gwen Tennyson in the Ben 10 franchise, Tulip Olsen in Infinity Train).
- August 11: Chris Hemsworth, Australian actor (voice of Thor in What If...?, Optimus Prime in Transformers One).
- August 14: Mila Kunis, Ukrainian-born American actress (voice of Meg Griffin in Family Guy, various characters in Robot Chicken, Deema in Hell and Back, Greta in Wonder Park).
- August 26: Rob Cantor, American composer and singer-songwriter (Disney Television Animation).
- August 30: Charise Castro Smith, American playwright, actress, screenwriter, producer, and director (Encanto).

=== September ===
- September 25: Donald Glover, aka Childish Gambino, American actor and musician (voice of Simba in The Lion King, Miles Morales in season 3 of Ultimate Spider-Man, Marshall Lee in Adventure Time, Yoshi in The Super Mario Galaxy Movie).

=== October ===
- October 3: Tessa Thompson, American actress (voice of Valkyrie in What If...?, Sophie in the Tuca & Bertie episode "The Sex Bugs", Taneisha in the BoJack Horseman episode "Love and/or Marriage").
- October 4: Laila Berzins, American actress (voice of Milluki Zoldyck in Hunter x Hunter, Flaming Fury in The Reflection, Mrs. Croaker in Amphibia, Yana in Rainbow Butterfly Unicorn Kitty, Nora Césaire in Miraculous: Tales of Ladybug & Cat Noir).
- October 5:
  - Jesse Eisenberg, American actor (voice of Blu in Rio and Rio 2).
  - Shelby Rabara, American actress and dancer (voice of Peridot in the Steven Universe franchise, Kitsune in Samurai Rabbit: The Usagi Chronicles).
- October 9: Spencer Grammer, American actress (voice of Summer Smith in Rick and Morty, Atlantis and Mother in the Robot Chicken episode "Please Do Not Notify Our Contractors", additional voices in the Solar Opposites episode "Hululand").
- October 13: Elizabeth Maxwell, American voice actress (voice of Winter Schnee in RWBY, Midnight in My Hero Academia, Arisa Uotani in Fruits Basket, Ymir in Attack on Titan, Caulifla in Dragon Ball Super, Sae Niijima in Persona 5: The Animation, Shakky in the Funimation dub of One Piece).
- October 27: Melanie Minichino, American actress (voice of Aunt May in Spidey and His Amazing Friends, Ava in T.O.T.S., Anya Corazon in Spider-Man, Watts in Blaze and the Monster Machines, Queen Isabella in The Mr. Peabody & Sherman Show).

=== November ===
- November 6: Jessica Borutski, American animator (Ren & Stimpy "Adult Party Cartoon"), storyboard artist (Warner Bros. Animation, The Snoopy Show), character designer (Warner Bros. Animation, Barbie: A Perfect Christmas), writer, producer (Bunnicula) and director (Warner Bros. Animation, The Loud House).
- November 7: Adam DeVine, American actor (voice of Pizza Steve in Uncle Grandpa, Boone Wiseman in Penn Zero: Part-Time Hero, Sam-I-Am in Green Eggs and Ham, Flash in The Lego Batman Movie, Julian in Ice Age Collision Course, Ed in Extinct, Tanner Fall in Captain Fall).
- November 14: Benjamin Renner, French cartoonist, animator and filmmaker (Ernest & Celestine, The Big Bad Fox and Other Tales..., Migration).
- November 17:
  - Patrick McHale, American animator, writer, storyboard artist (The Marvelous Misadventures of Flapjack, Adventure Time), songwriter and filmmaker (creator of Over the Garden Wall).
  - Harry Lloyd, English actor (voice of Viktor in Arcane, Butcher in the American Dad! episode "Widow's Pique", Captain Mann in the Star Wars: The Bad Batch episode "A Different Approach").
- November 19: Adam Driver, American actor (voice of Adam Sackler in The Simpsons episode "Every Man's Dream", Art in the Bob's Burgers episode "The Bleakening").

=== December ===
- December 8: Utkarsh Ambudkar, American actor (voice of Chikku in Mira, Royal Detective, Jay in The Simpsons episode "Much Apu About Something", Aladdin in the China, IL episode "Wild Hogs").
- December 12: Mathew Valencia, American actor (voice of Tim Drake/Robin in The New Batman Adventures and Superman: The Animated Series, Joaquin Cortez in the As Told by Ginger episode "Love with a Proper Transfer Student").
- December 20: Jonah Hill, American actor and filmmaker (voice of Snotlout in the How to Train Your Dragon franchise, the title character in Allen Gregory, Hal Stewart / Tighten in Megamind, Green Lantern in The Lego Movie franchise, Carl in Sausage Party, Tommy in Horton Hears a Who!, Andy Hamilton in The Simpsons episode "Pranks and Greens").
- December 21: Steven Yeun, American actor (voice of Keith in Voltron: Legendary Defender, Steve Palchuk in the Tales of Arcadia franchise, Little Cato in Final Space, the title character in Invincible, Speckle in Tuca & Bertie, Glenn Rhee in the Robot Chicken episode "The Robot Chicken Walking Dead Special: Look Who's Walking").
- December 26: Steven Hartman, American former child actor (portrayed Brock Lee in Casper: A Spirited Beginning, voice of Nicky, Mick, Student and Boy in Aaahh!!! Real Monsters, Charlie Brown in It Was My Best Birthday Ever, Charlie Brown, Curly Gammelthorpe in the Hey Arnold! episode "Downtown as Fruits").
- December 30: Kaitlyn Robrock, American voice actress (voice of Smurfette in The Drawn Together Movie: The Movie!, Mrs. Budnick and Weather Lady in Golan the Insatiable, Tommy Goodman and Candy in Mr. Pickles and Momma Named Me Sheriff, Retsuko's Mother in Aggretsuko, Felicia Sundew in Amphibia, Gwen in ThunderCats Roar, Betty in Tom and Jerry: Cowboy Up!, Susan in the Pickle and Peanut episode "Black Light Bowling", Nanny and Arcade Woman in the Doc McStuffins episode "Lost & Found", Oola in the Blaze and the Monster Machines episode "The Great Space Race", continued voice of Minnie Mouse).

== Deaths ==
=== January ===
- January 2: Dick Emery, British comedian and actor (voice of Jeremy Hillary Boob, the Mayor of Pepperland and Max the Blue Meanie in Yellow Submarine), dies at age 67.
- January 17:
  - John Dunn, Scottish animator and animation writer (Walt Disney Company, Warner Bros. Cartoons, DePatie-Freleng, Spider-Man), dies at age 63.
  - Doodles Weaver, American actor, comedian, musician, and comic writer (narrator in the Goofy cartoon Hockey Homicide), commits suicide at age 71.

=== February ===
- February 9: Zinaida Semyonovna Brumberg, Russian animator and film director (The Tale of Tsar Saltan, The Lost Letter, The Night Before Christmas, It Was I Who Drew the Little Man), dies at age 82.
- Specific date unknown: Helen Ogger, American inker and animator (Walt Disney Studios), dies at age 73.

=== March ===
- March 3: Hergé, Belgian cartoonist (creator of The Adventures of Tintin), dies from cardiac arrest at age 75.

=== April ===
- April 15: Ernestine Wade, American actress (voice of Butterfly in Song of the South, Billy's Mother in Hey, Hey, Hey, It's Fat Albert, Veronica's Aunt in Willie Mays and the Say-Hey Kid), dies at age 76.

=== May ===
- May 1: Eric Porter, Australian animator and film director (Marco Polo Junior Versus the Red Dragon), dies at age 71.
- May 7: József Romhányi, Hungarian writer, animation writer (The Gums, Kérem a következőt!) and translator (Hungarian dub of The Flintstones), dies at age 62.
- May 17: Jake Day, American artist, sculptor, photographer, naturalist and illustrator (Merbabies, The Milky Way, Bambi), dies at age 90.
- May 21: Boris Stepantsev, Russian film director, animator, and illustrator (Karlsson-on-the-Roof), dies at age 53.
- May 23: George Bruns, American composer (Walt Disney Animation Studios), dies at age 68.
- May 27: Les Goldman, American production manager and producer (co-founder of MGM Animation/Visual Arts), dies at age 69.

=== June ===
- June 30: Mary Livingstone, American actress and comedienne (voiced herself in The Mouse That Jack Built), dies at age 78.

=== August ===
- August 6: Grace Bailey, American animator (head of the ink and paint department at Walt Disney Animation Studios), dies at age 79.
- August 13: Zdeněk Liška, Czech composer (wrote music for the films of Jan Švankmajer and Karel Zeman), dies at age 61.

=== September ===
- September 5: Yale Gracey, Writer and layout artist (Walt Disney Animation Studios), was murdered at age 73.
- September 16: Danny Webb, American voice actor (voice of Egghead in Daffy Duck & Egghead and Cinderella Meets Fella), dies at age 77.
- September 30: Freddy Martin, American bandleader and tenor saxophonist (Bumble Boogie segment of Melody Time), dies at age 76.

=== October ===
- October 10: Ralph Richardson, British actor (voice of Chief Rabbit in Watership Down), dies at age 80.
- October 17: Mary Ellen Bute, American animator, animation producer and director (Tarantella), dies at age 77.
- October 28: Otto Messmer, American animator (Felix the Cat), dies at age 91.

=== November ===
- November 13: Jam Handy, American producer (A Case of Spring Fever), dies at age 97.
- November 15: John Le Mesurier, British actor (narrator of Bod), dies at age 71.

=== December ===
- December 20: Hermann Diehl, German animator and film director (The Seven Ravens, Mecki), dies at age 77.
- December 23: Walter Greene, American composer (Walter Lantz Productions, DePatie-Freleng Enterprises), dies at age 73.
- December 30: Libico Maraja, Italian illustrator, animator and comics artist (worked for the animation studio IMA Film), dies at age 71.
- December 31: Ralph Wright, American animator, storyboard writer (Walt Disney Company) and actor (voice of Eeyore in the Winnie the Pooh franchise), dies at age 75.

== See also ==
- 1983 in anime

== Sources ==
- Assouline, Pierre (2009). Hergé, the Man Who Created Tintin. Oxford and New York: Oxford University Press. ISBN 978-0-19-539759-8.
