= The Story of Perrine =

Japanese anime television series

- Title card
- ペリーヌ物語
- Genre: Adventure, historical, drama
- Based on: En Famille by Hector Malot
- Written by: Akira Miyazaki; Mei Katō; Kasuke Satō
- Directed by: Hiroshi Saitō; Shigeo Koshi
- Music by: Takeo Watanabe
- Country of origin: Japan
- Original language: Japanese
- No. of episodes: 53

Production
- Executive producer: Kōichi Motohashi
- Producers: Junzo Nakajima; Takagi Matsudo
- Production companies: Nippon Animation; Fuji Television

Original release
- Network: FNS (Fuji TV)
- Release: January 1 – December 31, 1978

Related
- Anime film

The Story of Perrine: The Movie
- Directed by: Hiroshi Saitō
- Studio: Nippon Animation
- Released: June 30, 1990
- Runtime: 110 minutes

The Story of Perrine (ペリーヌ物語, Perīnu Monogatari; lit. 'Story of Perrine') is a Japanese anime series by Nippon Animation. It is the fourth production in the World Masterpiece Theater series (Calpis Family Theater back then). It is based on the French novel En Famille by Hector Malot. The series originally aired on Sundays from January 1 to December 31, 1978, spanning 53 episodes.

It has been dubbed in several languages for some regions, such as Iran, Portugal, Italy, Spain, Latin America, the Arabic Speaking World, Germany, Romania, Thailand, and the Philippines.

A re-edited footage film with some newly re-recorded lines and a new narration was also released in Japan in 1990.

== En Famille ==
The anime is based on the novel En Famille by Hector Malot, which is also translated as Nobody's Girl. Another work by the author, Sans Famille, has a similar story. That work was used as the basis of an anime film, Chibikko Remi to Meiken Kapi, as well as two separate anime series, Nobody's Boy: Remi and Remi, Nobody's Girl.

== Plot ==
13-year-old Perrine Paindavoine is the daughter of an Anglo-Indian mother, Marie, and a French father, Edmond, who dies in Bosnia at the beginning of the story. Before dying, Edmond asks his wife and Perrine to return to his hometown, Maraucourt, where Perrine's grandfather, Vulfran, owns a factory and a family mansion. Perrine and her mother run a traveling photo studio on their journey to France. Upon reaching Paris, however, Marie falls ill. Although they sell everything they have to spend on medication, Marie eventually dies. On her deathbed, she reveals that Perrine must not expect a welcome from her grandfather. Vulfran strongly opposes Edmond's marriage and as such, he detests Perrine.

After the burial, Perrine embarks on an arduous journey to Maraucourt, traveling almost 150 kilometres (93 mi) on foot and barely surviving starvation. Once there, she assumes the identity of Aurelie to assess the situation in advance: Maraucourt is a town whose primary function is to house the workforce of its cotton mill, which Mr. Paindavoine owns. As such, the blind, stern Mr. Paindavoine is virtually the local ruler of the town and is feared by everyone, even his irresponsible nephew who expects to inherit the factory.

Aurelie secures the job of pushing rail carts in the factory. Soon, however, she is promoted to factory's interpreter, as she speaks both French and English fluently. Ultimately, through her efficiency, loyalty, and (unbeknownst to many) compassion, she becomes Vulfran's personal secretary and is invited to live in his mansion. Vulfran gradually grows fond of Aurelie, who has become his all-time companion without him asking. Coming so close to her grandfather, Aurelie learns about his personal life: having virtually no loving relative, Vulfran has started a search for Edmond, intent to bring him home. Aurelie translates his foreign communications but does not dare to mention that his search is in vain, because Vulfran makes no secret of his hatred for Edmond's wife and daughter, blaming them for stealing his son away, which hurts Aurelie.

Eventually, Vulfran is informed of the premature death of Edmond in Bosnia. The bad news is proved almost fatal, as Vulfran is struck down by grief and only survives the ordeal through the passionate care of Aurelie, who helps him recover. Vulfran is grateful to Aurelie; during a visit from the elderly "grandmother Françoise", once Edmond's nanny, he proclaims that Aurelie is an angel sent by God to save him because such unconditional love is unique for a total stranger. Françoise, a mutual friend of Aurelie since her arrival in Maraucourt, replies that the angel curiously resembles Edmond. Vulkan immediately sends his lawyer to investigate Aurelie's background and also acknowledges that if she is truly his granddaughter, he must make up for having said terrible things about Edmond's family in front of her.

After receiving confirmation that Aurelie is indeed Perrine, Vulfran undergoes dangerous eye surgery to see his granddaughter's face. He also orders the construction of a daycare center and healthy dormitories for the workers of the factory.

== Episodes ==
1. Setting Out (January 1, 1978)
2. A Long Journey (January 8, 1978)
3. Mother's Strength (January 15, 1978)
4. The Rebel Count (January 22, 1978)
5. Grandfather and Grandson (January 29, 1978)
6. Two Mothers (February 5, 1978)
7. The Circus Boy (February 12, 1978)
8. The Drunk Donkey (February 19, 1978)
9. Business Rivals (February 26, 1978)
10. The Camera Thieves (March 5, 1978)
11. Baron Does His Best (March 12, 1978)
12. An Audience of Two (March 19, 1978)
13. Crossing The Alps (March 26, 1978)
14. In A Beautiful Country (April 2, 1978)
15. France! France! (April 9, 1978)
16. Mother's Decision (April 16, 1978)
17. An Inn in Paris (April 23, 1978)
18. The Old Man At The Gate (April 30, 1978)
19. The Boy From Downtown Paris (May 7, 1978)
20. Farewell, Palikare (May 14, 1978)
21. Mother's Last Words (May 21, 1978)
22. Unforgettable Friends (May 28, 1978)
23. Solo Journey (June 4, 1978)
24. A Beautiful Rainbow (June 11, 1978)
25. Palikare! That's My Palikare! (June 18, 1978)
26. Kind Rouquerie-obasan (June 25, 1978)
27. Grandfather's Cold Face (July 2, 1978)
28. Working in Paindavoine Factory (July 9, 1978)
29. A Hut By The Lake (July 16, 1978)
30. All By Herself (July 23, 1978)
31. Perrine's Guests (July 30, 1978)
32. Her Secret Name (August 6, 1978)
33. Theodore's Wallet (August 13, 1978)
34. An Unforgettable Day (August 20, 1978)
35. The English Letters (August 27, 1978)
36. Joy and Anxiety (September 3, 1978)
37. Grandfather's Large Hand (September 10, 1978)
38. Her Lovely Dress (September 17, 1978)
39. A Letter From India (September 24, 1978)
40. Baron's Calamity (October 1, 1978)
41. A Castle-Like Château (October 8, 1978)
42. Rosalie's Sorrow (October 15, 1978)
43. On Sunday' Perrine... (October 22, 1978)
44. A Malicious Woman (October 29, 1978)
45. News From Bosnia (November 5, 1978)
46. Vulfran's Sorrow (November 12, 1978)
47. Aurelie's Face (November 19, 1978)
48. The Fire (November 26, 1978)
49. A Time for Joyful Tears (December 3, 1978)
50. The First Snow of Winter (December 10, 1978)
51. Grandfather's Eyes (December 17, 1978)
52. An Unforgettable Christmas (December 24, 1978)
53. Spring Cometh (December 31, 1978)

== Characters ==
Perrine Paindavoine (ペリーヌ・パンダボアヌ)
Voiced by: Hiromi Tsuru
Vulfran Paindavoine (ビルフラン・パンダボアヌ)
Voiced by: Kinshiro Iwao
Marie Paindavoine (マリ・パンダボアヌ)
Voiced by: Masako Ikeda
Edmond Paindavoine (エドモン・パンダボアヌ)
Voiced by: Daisaku Shinohara
Rosalie (ロザリー)
Voiced by: Kaoru Kurosu
Cesare (セザール)
Voiced by: Takkou Ishimori
Paul (ポール)
Voiced by: Nagisa Koyama

== Reception ==
Since its animation style was unsophisticated, the production was considered as mediocre, but near the end of the production, it became one of the most highly regarded pieces within World Masterpiece Theater.
