= Love Case =

- Vietnamese: Tình án
- Hán-Nôm: 情案
- Directed by: Võ Việt Hùng
- Screenplay by: Võ Đắc Dự; Hồ Văn Trung (novel)
- Produced by: Nguyễn Văn Vạn
- Starring: Huỳnh Anh Tuấn; Thiên Hương; Quế Phương; Thanh Trúc; Trương Minh Quốc Thái
- Cinematography: Đỗ Đức Long; Quốc Việt
- Edited by: Nguyễn Trọng Nghĩa
- Music by: Ngọc Sơn
- Production company: Ho Chi Minh City Television
- Distributed by: HCTV; VLRT
- Release date: 2008
- Running time: 45 minutes x 23 chaps
- Country: Vietnam
- Languages: Vietnamese; French

Love Case (Vietnamese: Tình án, Chinese: 案例的愛情) is a 2008 Vietnamese telefilm adapted from Hồ Văn Trung's July 1941 novel Cư kỉnh (居璟). The film was produced by Ho Chi Minh City Television and directed by Võ Việt Hùng.

== Plot ==
The film is set in Cần Thơ's village of Cochinchina in the 1930s. It features a family of district chief Mr. Hàm Tân (Huỳnh Anh Tuấn), in a time when romance novels infiltrated. Neighbour and writer Chí Cao (Trương Minh Quốc Thái) is killed with his paper-knife, but no one knows who his killer is. Suspects include killer Quận (Tấn Beo), Thị Lịnh (Hoàng Minh Minh), Mrs. District-chief Hàm Tân (Thiên Hương) and Túy (Quế Phương).

== Production ==
Shot on location at Gò Công, Saigon, Thủ Dầu Một, Sa Đéc, Trà Vinh, Bến Tre and Da Lat in 2008. The location used as the house of District-chief Hàm Tân was the famous address of Gò Công, its name was Prefecture-chief Hải's Oldhouse.

=== Film ===
- Product manager : Nguyễn Việt Hùng
- Assistant director : Lê Cường, Hồ Vân, Lê Văn Quý, Trần Minh Trung
- Accountant : Thúy Anh, Minh Phụng, Minh Hoa
- Camera : Cao Thành Danh, Đinh Anh Cường, Trần Văn Vinh, Đoàn Tiến Dũng, Trần Ngọc Thiện
- Design : Lê Cương, Lê Thắng, Hồng Minh, Vũ Ngọc Tâm, Huỳnh Ngọc Trạng
- Light : Nguyễn Minh Hoàng, Nguyễn Thành Vinh, Nguyễn Văn Đạt, Phan Phú Quý
- Make-up : Ngọc Vân, Hoàn Kim
- Costume : Trịnh Thế Bảo, Vũ Ngọc Linh

=== Music ===
- Theme songs "Looking down" (Cúi mặt) and "Round of the sorrow" (Vòng sầu) by Ngọc Sơn with Lam Tuyền's singing.

=== Cast ===
- Huỳnh Anh Tuấn ... Mr. District-chief Hàm Tân
- Thiên Hương ... Mrs. District-chief Hàm Tân
- Quế Phương ... Túy
- Thanh Trúc ... Huyên
- Trương Minh Quốc Thái ... Chí Cao
- Quốc Cường ... Mr. Prefecture-chief Huyền
- Phúc An ... Mrs. Prefecture-chief Huyền
- Tấn Beo ... Quận
- Trương Quỳnh Anh ... Bảng
- Mỹ Dung ... Lady Ba
- Hoàng Minh Minh ... Ngô Thị Lịnh
- Tấn Hưng ... Village-chief Tại
- Mai Thành ... Physician
- Ngọc Thảo ... Tú
- Lê Chẩn ... Chó
- Thu Hà ... Tư Thanh
- Tôn Thất Chương ... Thuần Phong
- Hào Khánh ... Clerk
- Minh Luân ... Accountant Thanh
- Thu Nga ... Ngọ
- Lê Cường ... The captain
- Trần Văn Đua ... The cop
- Hoàng Vũ ... Chief of village-guards
- Thierry Blanc ... The procurator
- Alfred ... The judge
- Michel Depart ... The medical-examiner
- Kim Loan ... Translator
- Chánh Thuận ... Canh
- Thủ Tín ... Huê
- Quang Đáng ... Bằng Linh
- Quang Thắng ... Village-teacher Kỉnh
- Hoàng Phong ... Prefecture-chief Huyền in his childhood
- Hoàng Tấn ... First lawyer
- Xuân Hùng ... Second lawyer
- Phan Trung Hiếu ... Bỉnh
- Mai Hạnh ... Village-notable Đống
- Lệ Hoa ... Wife of village-notable Đống
- Văn Tiến ... Tộ
- Minh Cường ... Tí
- Bạch Liên ... The watershop-innkeeper
- Lê Khắc Sinh Nhật ... Guard of the prefecture-chief
- Lê Tiến Phát ... Chí Cao in his childhood
- Thanh Lan ... The oldman loses his whaleboat
- Bảo Nghi ... Daughter of Thị Lịnh
- Diễm Tuyết ... Innkeeper of tailorshop Ngọc Lan
- Như Nguyệt ... The bookshop-innkeeper

and : Cao Kim Loan, Bích Thảo, Trần Ngọc Lìn, Lê Minh Phụng, Hồ Vân, Ngọc Tâm, Ngọc Hồng, Ngọc Phi, Kim Cương, Kim Lan, Thu Hà, Âu Ngọc Thủy, Thanh Vân, Phú Quý, Minh Hoa, Hoàng Oanh, Ngọc Ngự, Thanh Hồng, and Minh Trung

== Awards ==
Love Case received the Golden Ochna Integerrima Award for best film director (awarded to Võ Việt Hùng) in 2009.

== See also ==
- Lady of Tân Phong
