= Nobody's Boy: Remi =

Television program

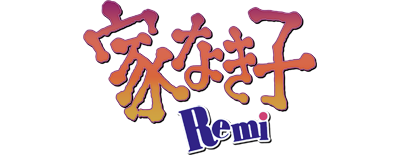

家なき子 (Ie Naki Ko)
- Genre: Adventure, Drama, Coming-of-age story, historical, Family, Slice of life
- Created by: Hector Malot
- Anime television series
- Directed by: Osamu Dezaki (chief)
- Produced by: Hidehiko Takei; Keishi Yamazaki
- Music by: Takeo Watanabe
- Studio: Tokyo Movie Shinsha (Note: Production assistance provided by Madhouse.)
- Licensed by: NA: AnimEigo (current); US: ImaginAsian (expired)
- Original network: NNS (NTV)
- Original run: October 2, 1977 – October 1, 1978
- Episodes: 51
- Anime film
- Directed by: Osamu Dezaki; Yoshio Takeuchi (assistant)
- Produced by: Tetsuo Katayama
- Written by: Takeo Watanabe
- Music by: Haruya Yamazaki; Tsunehisa Itō; Keiko Sugie
- Studio: Tokyo Movie Shinsha
- Released: March 15, 1980
- Runtime: 96 minutes

Nobody's Boy: Remi (Japanese: 家なき子, Hepburn: Ie Naki Ko; lit. 'Homeless Child') is a 1977–1978 Japanese anime series by Tokyo Movie Shinsha and Madhouse. The story is based upon French author Hector Malot's 1878 novel Sans Famille. It follows a young boy who works for a travelling group of players in the hope of earning money and seeing his foster family again. The anime is well known in Hong Kong, Taiwan, Latin America, especially Mexico, Canada (in French), France, the Netherlands, Italy, the Arab world, Indonesia, Russia and the Philippines.

A film version by the same studio and director was released in 1980.

In the Philippines, the anime was originally shown between 1979 and 1980 on RPN, but like the other contemporary anime broadcast in the same period (Candy Candy, Heidi, etc.), the full story was not shown. It was only after nearly twenty years that it was shown in full, under the title Remi on ABS-CBN, this time in Tagalog. ImaginAsian attempted to make the show available in America through on-demand DVD, but with no success. AnimEigo has licensed the show and will release it on Blu-ray in 2025.

In Mexico, the entire series was shown several times in the 1980s, with several generations experiencing and knowing the story as part of their upbringing. The same happened with Candy Candy and Heidi in that Latin American country, although Remi is possible the best known, as it was shown by the dominant TV station of the time, at the daily afternoon cartoon segment, between 4 and 7 pm, which was one of the 1980s traditions that all Mexican kids knew and enjoyed.

In the Netherlands, it was broadcast between 1979 and 1980 by AVRO and in 1996 by the EO. The AVRO version was released on DVD.

In 1996, a new adaptation of this story was aired in Japan. Remi, Nobody's Girl (家なき子レミ, Ie Naki Ko Remi) was created by Nippon Animation as part of their World Masterpiece Theater series.

In 1995, Nobody's Boy: Remi was also broadcast by RCTI.

== Plot ==
With the story being set in 19th century France, Remi lives with his mother in a French village called Chavanon. His father Jerome Barberin works in Paris. When he is injured, he decides to return to his village, though he is a changed man and is much hard-hearted. Remi discovers that he is actually a foundling. Barberin sells Remi to a traveling artist named Vitalis and his animal group. Remi, who has lost the love of his father and his familiar environment accepts his fate. He leaves the house and confronts the harshness of a traveling artist's life. Along the way, he meets a lovely rich lady named Mrs. Milligan and her sick child named Arthur, who is actually turned out to be his real mother and younger brother. Life with them is great, but Remi didn't know the truth and he decided to leave to go with Vitalis. Tragedies strike one after another to leave Remi alone with only but the faithful dog, Capi. Between staying with a gardening family, where he becomes attached to the youngest mute girl Lise, and traveling with his rowdy best friend Mattia. Making a living playing the harp, Remi searches for a place in life, a place where he can belong. This is until he discovers his real parents may be alive, and undertakes a perilous journey to London, a city in England in search of his family. Remi and Mattia moved in with a man named Driscoll and his family, until after living there for a while, Remi and Mattia realized that the family are a criminal group for money. Later, the police arrest Driscoll and his family for larceny, but Remi is mistaken for being one of them. Mattia and a circus troupe by the names of Bob, Max and Peter rescue Remi, and Remi and Mattia travel back to France to finally found Remi's real family. Lise finally spoke, Arthur is able to walk and Mattia is adopted by the Milligan family and became Remi's adoptive brother. Remi's real name is revealed to be Richard since he was born. Then, 10 years later, Remi became a lawyer and marries Lise, and Mattia became a violinist.

== Characters ==
- Remi: Masako Sugaya
- Vitalis: Yōsuke Kondō
- Mrs. Milligan: Reiko Mutō
- Mrs. Baraberin: Hiroko Suzuki
- Jerome Baraberin: Takeshi Aono
- Mattia: Noriko Ohara

== Episodes ==
1. Remi from Chavanon Village (October 2, 1977)
2. Remi, The Child of Destiny (October 9, 1977)
3. Remi's Departure (October 16, 1977)
4. March Forward, Remi! (October 23, 1977)
5. Remi's Debut (October 30, 1977)
6. Remi and his Sky-Blue Classroom (November 6, 1977)
7. Do Re Mi Fa Remi (November 13, 1977)
8. Lost Boy Remi (November 20, 1977)
9. My First Friend, Grace (November 27, 1977)
10. An Unexpected Occurrence (December 4, 1977)
11. Vitalis' Trial (December 11, 1977)
12. Little Director Remi (December 18, 1977)
13. A Meeting with the Swan (December 25, 1977)
14. Remi's Troupe on the Swan (January 1, 1978)
15. A Happy Boat Ride (January 8, 1978)
16. Dreaming of My Two Mothers (January 15, 1978)
17. Goodbye Swan (January 22, 1978)
18. Don't Look Back Remi (January 29, 1978)
19. In a Raging Blizzard (February 5, 1978)
20. Remi and the Wolf (February 12, 1978)
21. Birth of a New Life (February 19, 1978)
22. The Famous Joli Coeur (February 26, 1978)
23. A Great Master (March 5, 1978)
24. My New Paris Friend, Mattia (March 12, 1978)
25. Boss Garofoli (March 19, 1978)
26. Farewell, My Son (March 26, 1978)
27. Vitalis's Past (April 2, 1978)
28. Lise's Feelings (April 9, 1978)
29. The Happy Greenhouse (April 16, 1978)
30. The Ring Bond (April 23, 1978)
31. Thank You, Mattia (April 30, 1978)
32. A Great Idea (May 7, 1978)
33. My Outrageous Friend (May 14, 1978)
34. A Storm! 250 Meters Below (May 21, 1978)
35. Save Remi! (May 28, 1978)
36. Mattia the Musical Genius (June 4, 1978)
37. A Present for Mom (June 11, 1978)
38. Mrs. Barberin (June 18, 1978)
39. Hurry to Paris! (June 25, 1978)
40. Remi is English! (July 2, 1978)
41. I Finally Meet My Parents (July 9, 1978)
42. The Driscolls' True Identity (July 16, 1978)
43. The Milligan Family Insignia (July 30, 1978)
44. The Bond of Mother and Child (August 6, 1978)
45. My Mother Has Gone Away (August 13, 1978)
46. In the Midst of Despair (August 20, 1978)
47. A Desperate Dive (September 3, 1978)
48. Storm on the Dover Strait (September 10, 1978)
49. My Two Mothers (September 17, 1978)
50. Her First Word...Remi! (September 24, 1978)
51. Beginning A New Journey (October 1, 1978)

== See also ==
- Sans Famille, the novel by French author Hector Malot on which this anime was based.
- Perrine Monogatari, the anime adaptation of Malot's accompanying novel En Famille.
