= Nobody's Girl (novel) =

Book by Hector Malot

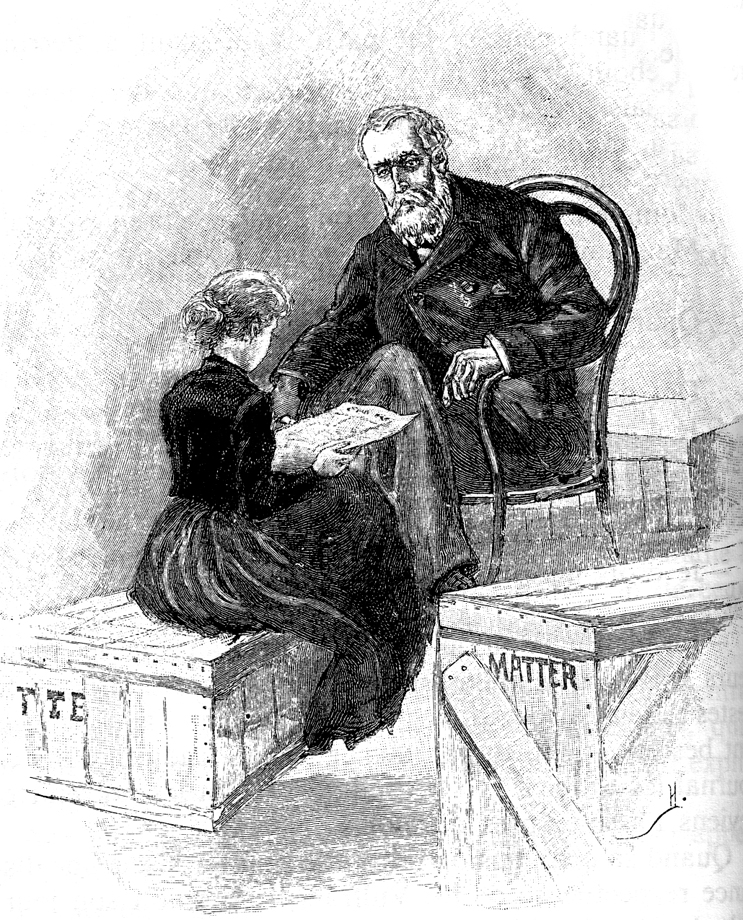
- Illustration d’Henri Lanos.
- Author: Hector Malot
- Illustrator: Henri Lanos
- Language: French
- Genre: Novel
- Publisher: Ernest Flammarion
- Publication date: August 13 – October 11, 1893 (magazine); 1893 (novel)
- Publication place: France
- Pages: 512
- Text: Nobody's Girl at Wikisource

Nobody's Girl (French: En Famille, lit. Amongst Family) is an 1893 novel by Hector Malot. The story was later translated into English as The Story of Perrine by Gil Meyner. It is also known as Adventures of Perrine.

It was serialized in 60 installments in Le Petit Journal from August 13 to October 11, 1893, and was later published in the same year in two volumes by Ernest Flammarion, with illustrations by Henri Lanos. In 1894, it received the Montyon Prize from the Académie Française.

== Plot ==
The story follows 13-year-old Perrine. She first arrives in Paris with her ill mother in a cart with very few possessions pulled by a donkey, Palikare. She stays at the Guillot field, where her mother gets really ill. In order to have enough money for medicine, Perrine sells Palikare, with the help of Grain-of-Salt (the owner of Guillot fields) to La Rouquerie. Despite all the care, Perrine's mother dies, leaving Perrine as an orphan, so Perrine sets off on foot, almost penniless, to find her relatives in Maraucourt. She makes a friend, Rosalie, who shows the Factories of Mr. Vulfran Paindavoine, and lets her lodge at her grandmother's for a little money. Perrine refrains from letting anybody in Maraucourt know her real name, and uses the pseudonym Aurelie til the end of the book. As Perrine is one of the few people who can speak English, except for Mr. Benndite, she soon comes close to Mr. Vulfran, who eventually lets her stay with him. As the book progresses Mr. Vulfran learns to love Perrine, and it is only in the end where he finds out that Perrine is his own granddaughter.

== Adaptations ==
In 1966 the novel was adapted in a French 16-episode television series of the same name by Jean Vernier, with Patricia Calas as Perrine and Henri Nassiet as Vulfran Paindavoine.

In 1978, Japanese anime series, Perrine Monogatari, was based on the novel. It is part of the World Masterpiece Theater collection, which also adapted Nobody's Boy, another of Malot's novels, into an anime called Remi, Nobody's Girl.
