= Võ Việt Hùng =

Vietnamese film director

- Born: Võ Việt Hùng; 29 July 1960 (age 65); Saigon, South Vietnam
- Citizenship: Vietnam
- Occupation: Film director
- Years active: 1990s -
- Website: Facebook

Võ Việt Hùng (1960 -) is the Vietnamese film director.

== Biography ==
Võ Việt Hùng was born in Saigon on 29 July 1960.

== Career ==
- Long xích lô (2003)
- Công ty thời trang (2004)
- Chuyện của chính mình
- Mầm sống
- Người gác mộ (2005)
- Tiếng chuông trôi trên sông
- Love Case (2008)
- Tại tôi (2009)
- Tân Phong nữ sĩ (2009)
- Khóc thầm (2010)
- Sắc màu hạnh phúc (2011)
- Mơ hoang (2012)
- Vẫn có em bên đời (2014)
- Chữ trinh (2015)
- Thế thái nhân tình (2016)
- Con gái chị Hằng (2017)

== Award ==
- 2009 : The Golden Ochna Integerrima Award for telefilm Love Case.
