= Remi, Nobody's Boy =

- Theatrical release poster
- French: Rémi sans famille
- Directed by: Antoine Blossier
- Written by: Antoine Blossier
- Based on: Sans Famille by Hector Malot
- Produced by: Antoine Blossier; Philippe Rousselet
- Starring: Daniel Auteuil; Maleaume Paquin; Virginie Ledoyen; Jonathan Zaccaï; Jacques Perrin; Ludivine Sagnier
- Cinematography: Romain Lacourbas
- Edited by: Stéphane Garnier
- Music by: Romaric Laurence
- Production companies: TF1 Group; Jerico
- Distributed by: Mars Films
- Release dates: September 30, 2018 (Festival Première); December 12, 2018 (France)
- Running time: 105 minutes
- Country: France
- Language: French
- Box office: $7.5 million

Remi, Nobody's Boy (French: Rémi sans famille) is a 2018 French historical comedy-drama film directed by Antoine Blossier. The story is based on the French author Hector Malot's novel Sans Famille.

== Synopsis ==
The beginning of the film takes place in an orphanage on a stormy night. The terrified children are gathered on an old man, who tells a story about his childhood, and the man's name is Rémi.

Rémi is a young boy found abandoned at a church as a baby. The boy grew up happily with his mother, but difficulties came when his father had an accident and was sued. Rémi was tried to be taken to an orphanage by his father when they met with a former violinist named Vitalis, a street performer with a monkey, Lovely Heart (Joli-Coeur in original French), and a dog, Capi. Vitalis discovered Rémi's singing talent and offered to "rent" the boy to escape the orphanage. Their adventure begins...

== Cast ==
- Daniel Auteuil as Vitalis
- Maleaume Paquin as Rémi
- Jacques Perrin as elder Rémi
- Virginie Ledoyen as Mrs. Harper
- Jonathan Zaccaï as Jérôme Barberin
- Ludivine Sagnier as Mrs. Barberin
- Zoe Boyle as Mrs. Milligan
- Albane Masson as Lise
- Nicholas Rowe as James Milligan
- Nicola Duffett as Mrs. Driscoll
- Simon Armstrong as Mr. Driscoll
- Fleur Greffier as Dame auberge

== Production ==
Principal photography began on 18 April 2017 in the Tarn department, including in Cordes-sur-Ciel, Castelnau-de-Montmiral and Albi, and continued shooting in Castelnaudary (Aude) and then on the Aubrac plateau in Aveyron and Lozère, including the Déroc waterfall near the village of Nasbinals, until 19 May 2017 and concluding filming in Paris and Epinay Studios. Filming was kept strictly secret to avoid revealing the sets and costumes before the film's release. Between 600 and 800 extras were expected to participate.
