= Kazue Takahashi =

Japanese voice actress

- 高橋 和枝
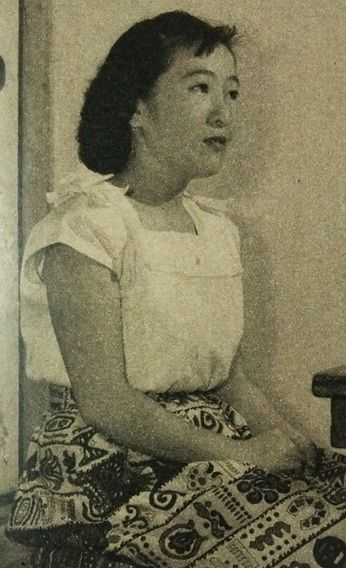
- Kazue Takahashi in 1952
- Born: Kazue Oizumi; March 20, 1929; Ōtawara, Tochigi Prefecture, Japan
- Died: March 23, 1999 (aged 70); Bunkyō, Tokyo, Japan
- Occupations: Actress; voice actress
- Years active: 1949–1998

Kazue Oizumi (大泉 和枝, Ōizumi Kazue; March 20, 1929 – March 23, 1999), known by the stage name Kazue Takahashi (高橋 和枝, Takahashi Kazue), was a Japanese actress and voice actress. She was best known as the voice of Shoutarou Kaneda ("Jimmy Sparks") in Tetsujin 28-go ("Gigantor"). She debuted in 1949.

Takahashi was also known for roles in Kaiju Booska and Sazae-san.

Takahashi graduated from Kasei-Gakuin University.

In February 1998, she came down with myelodysplastic syndrome and was transported to the Bunkyo-ku Tokyo University hospital. Three days after her 70th birthday, Takahashi died in the Bunkyo-ku Tokyo University hospital annex. She presumably died from bone marrow cancer.

In February 2010, she received a posthumous "Special Merit Award" from the 4th Seiyū Awards.

== Voice roles ==
=== Anime ===
- Andersen Stories as Evil Queen, Kirt
- Akane-chan as Hidemaro
- Chibikko Remi to Meiken Kapi as Pepe
- Dokonjo Gaeru as Goro
- Doraemon (1973) as Suneo's Mother
- F as Sayuri
- Gauche the Cellist as Child tanuki
- Gegege no Kitaro
- Giant Robo as Rudo
- Tetsujin 28-go as Shoutarou Kaneda
- Kashi no Ki Mokku
- Katri, Girl of the Meadows as Gunilla
- Kikansha Yaemon D51 no Daiboken as Chuuko
- Steel Jeeg as Queen Himika & Mayumi Shiba
- Kujira no Josephina as Josephina
- Dinosaur War Izenborg as Witch Zobina
- Kyoryu Tankentai Born Free as Masao Masaki
- Meiken Jolie
- Trider G7 as Okane
- Nagagutsu Sanjyuushi as Jane
- Ogon Bat as Takeru Yamato
- Osomatsu-kun as Chibita
- Phoenix 2772 as Pincho
- Sazae-san as Katsuo (2nd voice)
- Shin Mitsubachi Maaya no Boken as Thekla
- Moomin as Jane
- Tonde Mon Pe as Lady Kamata
- Brave Raideen

=== Dub ===
- ALF as Raquel Ochmonek
- Atom Ant as Atom Ant
- The Magilla Gorilla Show as Magilla Gorilla
- E.T. the Extra-Terrestrial as E.T. (VHS Dub)
- The Tom and Jerry Comedy Show as the voice of Tom
- Suspiria as Miss Tanner (1979 TBS Dub)
- The Bugs Bunny Show as Bugs Bunny
- Daddy Long Legs as Alicia Pritchard (1970 TBS Dub)
- The Mirror Crack'd as Miss Marple (1983 TBS Dub)
- Johnny Dangerously as Ma Kelly (1991 NTV Dub)
- Willow as Queen Bavmorda (DVD Dub)
- The Glass Slipper as Widow Sonder (1969 NHK Dub)
- Witness for the Prosecution as Miss Plimsoll (1972 NET Dub)
- Every Which Way But Loose as Herb (1983 NTV Dub)
- Any Which Way You Can as Ma Boggs (1985 TV Asahi Dub)
- The Champ as Dolly Kenyon (1981 TV Asahi Dub)
- Deadly Friend as Elvira Parker (1990 TBS Dub)
- Bell, Book and Candle as Queenie Holroyd (1970 NET Dub)
- Strangers on a Train as Barbara Morton (1966 NET Dub)
- Murder by Death as Jessica Marbles (1981 TBS Dub)
- The Cheap Detective as Betty Deboop (1982 TBS Dub)
- Limelight as Mrs. Alsop (1977 TBS Dub)
- Throw Momma from the Train as Mrs. "Momma" Lift
