= Doraemon: The New Record of Nobita's Spaceblazer =

2009 film by Shigeo Koshi

Doraemon the Movie: The New Record of Nobita's Spaceblazer
- Theatrical release poster
- Kanji: 映画ドラえもん 新・のび太の宇宙開拓史
- Revised Hepburn: Eiga Doraemon Shin Nobita No Uchu Kaitakushi
- Directed by: Shigeo Koshi
- Screenplay by: Yuichi Shinbo
- Based on: Doraemon's Long Stories: The Records of Nobita, Spaceblazer by Fujiko F. Fujio
- Starring: Wasabi Mizuta; Megumi Ohara; Yumi Kakazu; Subaru Kimura; Tomokazu Seki; Tomo Sakurai; Rei Sakuma; Karina; Chiaki; Rei Sakuma; Naoko Watanabe
- Music by: Kan Sawada
- Production companies: Shin-Ei Animation; Fujiko Pro; Shogakukan; ShoPro; TV Asahi; Asatsu-DK
- Distributed by: Toho
- Release date: March 7, 2009 (Japan)
- Running time: 102 minutes
- Country: Japan
- Language: Japanese
- Box office: $61.48 million

Doraemon the Movie: The New Record of Nobita's Spaceblazer (映画ドラえもん: 新・のび太の宇宙開拓史, Eiga Doraemon: Shin Nobita No Uchu Kaitakushi), also known as Doraemon: The Hero 2009 then later as Doraemon the Movie: The New Records of Nobita, Spaceblazer is a 2009 Japanese animated science fiction neo-western film. It's the 29th of Doraemon films series. It is a remake of the 1981 movie The Records of Nobita, Spaceblazer. This is the first film released during the celebration of TV Asahi's 50th Anniversary. It was voted the No.1 Movie in Japan as of March 9, 2009.It ranked as the 4th highest grossing Japanese animated film in 2009.

== Plot ==
The film opens with Roppuru and Morina playing on a park in a spaceship. Suddenly, they feel an earthquake which paralyses the ship. Morina's father wants to fix the spaceship, but as he finishes, lightning strikes and he is presumed dead.

Nobita then wakes up, thinking that was all a dream. Doraemon tells him that Gian and Suneo want to find him. Gian and Suneo get him to convince them to get the empty lot from a group of middle school baseball players, but they chase him and knock him out. Nobita then dreams again, this time of Roppuru and Chammy who are trying to flee capture by a ship. After he wakes up, the other main characters make him get Doraemon to create land for a baseball stadium which both of them reluctantly agree to.

When Nobita is asleep, he suddenly feels an trembles underneath him. Chammy forces the door between them open, Nobita wakes Doraemon and both of them see her stealing food from the fridge. They chase after Chammy and after successfully catching her, shows them the passageway leading into the spaceship. After they enter the spaceship, they fix it up and leave for home.

Nobita and Doraemon are worried if both of them made home last night and head through the passage once more, just to get stranded. Once they wake up, they meet Roppuru's family and Morina who is dismissive of them but also realize the spaceship went missing. Once it is found they leave and promise to bring their friends in.

The following day, Nobita brings the rest of his friends along but they get attacked by mining agents who wanted to get resources from the planet. His friends then subsequently flee back to their dimension. Later on, Dorami takes away Doraemon to go to see the doctor, when Nobita tries to leave by himself, he gets sucked into another dimension and reaches another planet. There he is chased by an unknown figure, only to be saved by one of Doraemon's gadgets.

On the next visit, Nobita and Doraemon encounter the same agents and get into a fight again. They are defeated along with their ship, Roppuru tells the town's people about their story, but the miners took away the evidence. This prompts their local headquarters to call on Guillermin to help them defeat Nobita and Doraemon. He devises multiple schemes to get them either knocked out or killed but fail each time leading him to resort to his final options.

Doraemon and Nobita tell the others they are not able to come back for a while. Guillermin questions Morina and claims to be sorry about her father's death revealing "information" on why it happened. Other agents attaches a bomb to the dimensional door such that anyone who opens it will be blown up. All the while, Nobita's mother scolds him once more saying that he must stay in his room no matter what. Once they do try to open it, the bomb explodes leaving the ship in ruins but not affecting them.

The people of Koya Koya are told to leave the planet as the mining corporation intends to blow it up and enter a panic. Chammy and Clem retrieve the dimensional door while Morina and Ropporu try to figure out what is truly going on. Once Chammy enters Nobita's room, she along with Nobita and Doraemon go inside trying to find Roppuru, while Nobita's other friends and Dorami follow suit while all of them knowing this is the last time they can enter this planet.

Doraemon and Nobita fight their way through and ultimately Guillermin who duels Nobita but is defeated. The detonation button is pressed and the higher ups flee from the scene. Doraemon, Nobita, Roppuru, and Morina use a robotic machine to take the destructive device away from the planet into another dimension, where it explodes. Due to some dimensional distortion, Morina enters another dimension and finds her father who resided in that planet the whole time.

The movie ends with everyone bidding each other farewell, while Nobita and Doraemon think about their experiences in Koya Koya.

== Cast ==
| Character | Japanese voice actor |
|---|---|
| Doraemon | Wasabi Mizuta |
| Nobita Nobi | Megumi Ōhara |
| Shizuka Minamoto | Yumi Kakazu |
| Takeshi "Gian" Gōda | Subaru Kimura |
| Suneo Honekawa | Tomokazu Seki |
| Dorami | Chiaki |
| Teacher | Wataru Takagi |
| Tamako Nobi | Kotono Mitsuishi |
| Nobisuke Nobi | Yasunori Matsumoto |
| Roppuru | Tomo Sakurai |
| Chammy | Rei Sakuma |
| Clem | Ayaka Wilson |
| Raiza | Naoko Watanabe |
| Gamoran | Chafurin |
| Morina | Karina Yui Horie (young) |
| Bubu | Atsuko Mine |
| Guillermin | Akio Ōtsuka |
| Doubt | Yoshimi Tokui |
| Uno | Mitsunori Fukuda |
| Mr. Burns | Kenryuu Horiuchi |
| Hidetoshi Dekisugi | Shihoko Hagino |
| Mrs. Gōda | Miyako Takeuchi |
| Guards | Shigeru Shibuya; Yasuhiro Takato |
| Police Officer | Fumihiko Goto |
| Citizen | Maru Tamari |
| Spacecraft member | Koichi Wakata |

== Home media ==
A special DVD version of this movie was released on December 12, 2009. It includes 2 bonus features including Nobita & Roppuru and The Making of The Movie.

== Soundtrack ==
- Opening song: 『夢をかなえてドラえもん』 (Dream comes true, Doraemon), sung by MAO.
- Ending song: 『大切にするよ』 (Taisetsu ni Suru Yo), sung by Kou Shibasaki.
- Insert song: 『キミが笑う世界』, sung by Ayaka Wilson.

== See also ==
- List of Doraemon films
