= Chibikko Remi to Meiken Kapi =

Chibikko Rémi to Meiken Capi
- Directed by: Yūgo Serikawa
- Screenplay by: Shoji Segawa
- Based on: Sans Famille by Hector Malot
- Starring: Frankie Sakai; Yukari Asai; Akiko Hirai; Akiko Tsuboi; Chiharu Kuri; Etsuko Ichihara; Fuyumi Shiraishi; Haruko Mabuchi; Hiroshi Ohtake; Kazue Takahashi; Kenji Utsumi; Kousei Tomita; Masao Mishima; Reiko Katsura; Sachiko Chijimatsu; Yasuo Tomita
- Edited by: Yutaka Chikura
- Music by: Chuji Kinoshita
- Production company: Toei Animation
- Distributed by: Toei Company
- Release date: March 17, 1970 (Japan)
- Running time: 81 minutes
- Country: Japan
- Language: Japanese

Rémi and Capi (ちびっ子レミと名犬カピ, Chibikko Remi to Meiken Kapi; lit. Remi the Little Boy and Capi the Notorious Dog) is a 1970 Japanese animated film.

== See also ==
- Sans Famille
