= Thanh Trúc =

Vietnamese actress and singer

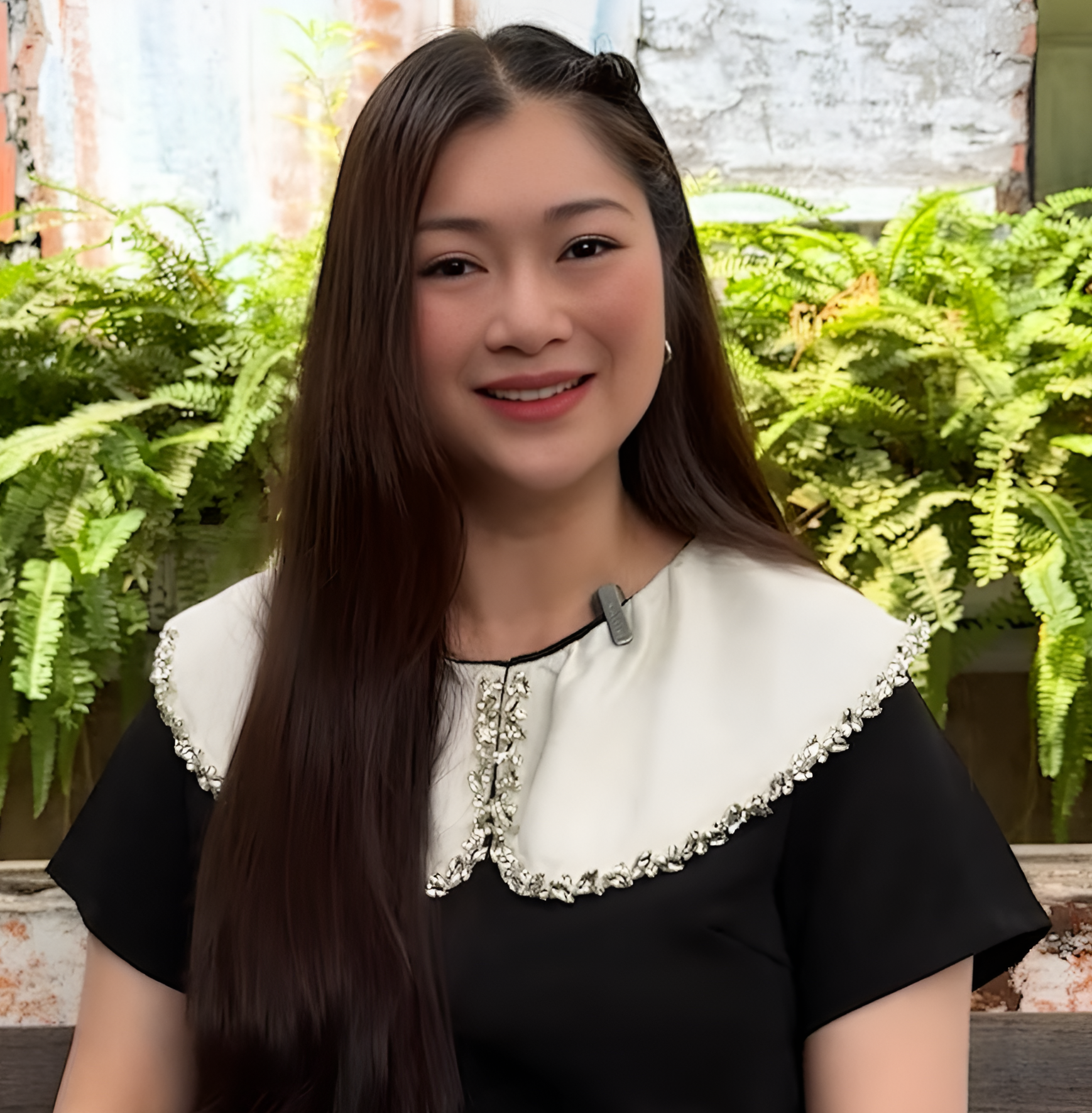
- Trúc in 2025
- Born: Phạm Lương Thanh Trúc; September 11, 1986 (age 40); Ho Chi Minh City, Vietnam
- Occupations: Singer; Actress

Phạm Lương Thanh Trúc (born on September 11, 1986, in Ho Chi Minh City) is a Vietnamese television and film actress and singer. She is a former member of the girl group J8687.
