= Tsuneo Maeda =

Japanese director and animator (born 1946)

- Born: 2 December 1946 (age 79)
- Occupations: Director and animator

Tsuneo Maeda (前田 庸生, Maeda Tsuneo; born 2 December 1946) is a Japanese director and animator. Maeda has served as animation director and technical director on various animated films and television series. He is currently a professor of animation at Kyoto Seika University.

== Works ==
=== Anime ===
- Zoo Without an Elephant (1982) - Director
- Noel's Fantastic Trip (1983) - Director
- Flight of the White Wolf (1990) - Director
- Tama and Friends (1993) - Director

=== TV series ===
- Sunset on Third Street (1990–91) - Director
