= Mrs. Pepperpot =

- Mrs. Pepperpot Stories book cover
- First appearance: 1956
- Created by: Alf Prøysen

In-universe information
- Nationality: Norwegian

Mrs. Pepperpot (Norwegian: Teskjekjerringa, translation: The Teaspoon Lady) is a fictional character in a series of children's books created by the Norwegian author Alf Prøysen.

The first book in the series was printed in 1956 in Sweden and in Norway from 1957.

== Plot ==
The main character, Mrs. Pepperpot, is a little old lady who lives in a cottage in the countryside together with her husband, Mr. Pepperpot. Mrs. Pepperpot has a secret – she occasionally shrinks to the size of a pepperpot, but nevertheless always manages to cope with the tricky situations that she encounters, at least partially thanks to the fact that upon shrinking she also gains the ability to understand and talk to all animals.

== Bibliography ==
Some of the Mrs. Pepperpot stories are:

- Little Old Mrs. Pepperpot
- Mrs. Pepperpot and the Mechanical Doll
- Mrs. Pepperpot buys Macaroni
- Queen of the Crows
- Mrs. Pepperpot at the Bazaar
- Mr. Puffblow's Hat
- Miriam from America
- Jumping Jack and his Friends
- The Potato with Big Ideas
- The Mice and the Christmas Tree
- Never Take No for an Answer
- Mr. Learn-a-lot and the Singing Midges
- Mrs. Pepperpot to the Rescue
- Mrs. Pepperpot on the Warpath
- The Nature Lesson
- The Shoemaker's Doll
- Mrs. Pepperpot is Taken for a Witch
- The Little Mouse Who was Very Clever
- Mrs. Pepperpot's Birthday
- The Dancing Bees
- How the King Learned to Eat Porridge
- Mrs. Pepperpot Turns Fortune-Teller
- The Fairytale Boy
- The Ski-Race
- Mrs. Pepperpot Again
- Mrs. Pepperpot and the Bilberries
- Mrs. Pepperpot Minds the Baby
- Mrs. Pepperpot's Penny Watchman
- The Bad Luck Story
- Mrs. Pepperpot and the Moose
- Mrs. Pepperpot Finds a Hidden Treasure
- Mr. Pepperpot
- The Ogres
- The Good Luck Story
- Mr Big Toe's Journey
- A Concertina Concert
- A Birthday Party in Topsy Turvy Town
- Father Christmas and the Carpenter
- Mrs. Pepperpot in the Magic Wood
- Mrs. Pepperpot in the Puppet Show
- Midsummer Eve with the Ogres
- Mrs. Pepperpot and the Baby Crow
- Mrs. Pepperpot Learns to Swim
- Mrs. Pepperpot Gives a Party
- Sir Mark the Valiant
- Mrs. Pepperpot Turns Detective
- Mrs. Pepperpot and the Brooch Hunt
- Mrs. Pepperpot's Outing
- Mrs. Pepperpot has a Visitor from America
- Gaby Gob gets a Letter from the King
- Mrs. Pepperpot and the Budgerigar
- The New Year's Eve Adventure
- Fate and Mrs. Pepperpot
- Mrs. Pepperpot Helps Arne
- Spring Cleaning
- Easter Chicks
- The Cuckoo
- Midsummer Romance
- Mrs. Pepperpot and the Pedlar
- The Moose Hunt
- Mr. Pepperpot and the Weather
- Mrs. Pepperpot in Hospital
- Mrs. Pepperpot's Christmas

== Adaptations ==
In 1967 and 1976, it was the choice for the Sveriges Television's Christmas calendar. In Swedish the character is called Teskedsgumman, which is a direct translation from Norwegian.

A Japanese anime television series adaptation of "Mrs. Pepperpot" called Spoon Oba-san was produced by Studio Pierrot in the 1980s.
