= Shigeo Koshi =

Japanese animator

- Occupations: Animator; Director

Shigeo Koshi (腰繁男, Koshi Shigeo) is a Japanese anime director and storyboard artist. His directing credits include Dogtanian and the Three Muskehounds and Doraemon: The New Record of Nobita's Spaceblazer. He has also worked on storyboards or direction for anime including The Adventures of Pinocchio, The Story of Perrine and Anne of Green Gables.

== Filmography ==
=== As director ===
- 1976: The Adventures of Pinocchio
- 1977: Rascal the Raccoon
- 1978: The Story of Perrine
- 1979: Anne of Green Gables
- 1981: Dogtanian and the Three Muskehounds
- 1983: Alice in Wonderland
- 1983: Rock 'n Roll Kids
- 1988: Toppo Jijo
- 1993: The Bots Master
- 1997: Revolutionary Girl Utena
- 1998: Grander Musashi RV
- 2009: Doraemon the Movie: The New Records of Nobita's Spaceblazer

=== As animator ===
- 1986: Silverhawks
- 1987: Thundercats
- 1993: The Bots Master
- 2001: Santa, Baby!
- 2003: Globi and the Stolen Shadows
