= Bình Thành =

Bình Thành may refer to the following locations in Vietnam:

- Bình Thành, Đồng Tháp, a commune of Đồng Tháp province
- Bình Thành, Tây Ninh, a commune of Tây Ninh province
- Bình Thành, Thái Nguyên, a commune of Thái Nguyên province
