= Mrs. Pepper Pot (TV series) =

Japanese anime TV series

- Mrs. Pepperpot
- Promotional poster for Spoon Oba-san

スプーンおばさん (Supūn Oba-san)
- Genre: Fantasy
- Anime television series
- Directed by: Keiji Hayakawa
- Produced by: Matsue Jinbo; Shouji Hara; Tsuneyuki Morishima; Yasuhiko Tan
- Music by: Tachio Akano
- Studio: Studio Pierrot
- Licensed by: NA: Discotek Media
- Original network: NHK General TV
- Original run: April 4, 1983 – March 9, 1984
- Episodes: 130

Mrs. Pepperpot, known in Japanese as Spoon Oba-san (スプーンおばさん, Supūn Oba-san; lit. 'Aunt Spoon' or 'Old lady Spoon'), is a Japanese anime television series, based on the children's books of Mrs. Pepperpot by the Norwegian author Alf Prøysen. The series was broadcast on NHK General TV from April 4, 1983, to March 9, 1984, spanning a total of 130 10-minute episodes.

== Plot ==
Mrs. Spoon Pepperpot lives in a small village with her husband Fork. She wears a small magical teaspoon around her neck which sometimes causes her to shrink her to the size of the teaspoon. As the teaspoon remains the same size, Mrs. Pepperpot must carry it on her back when she is shrunk. She always changes back to her original size after a certain amount of time. This special condition allows her to communicate with animals and enjoy adventures in the woods. As a result she makes new and interesting friends regularly.

She is a good friend of Lily, a mysterious little girl who lives in the forest alone. She is also friends with a mouse family. Mrs. Pepperpot cannot reveal her secret or show herself in the shrunk condition, which can be difficult. Her husband eventually finds out her secret later on in the series.

== Characters ==
- Mrs. Spoon Pepperpot: The main character of the series, she possesses a magic spoon which changes her size unexpectedly.
- Mr. Fork Pepperpot: Mrs. Pepperpot's husband, he is a professional painter. A stubborn and hotheaded character, he is initially unaware of his wife's secret.
- Fluffy: the Pepperpot family dog
- Cleo: the Pepperpot family cat
- Mr. and Mrs. Björn Halken: A mouse couple and their five mice children Dee, Dum, Fa, La, and Thump, they live in a wall of the Pepperpot's house.
- Lily: A mysterious girl who lives in the forest with her pet mink Lou. Initially, she is the only one who knows Mrs. Pepperpot's secret, which she helps her keep.
- Andy, Buck, and Cappa: Three young boys who often play together.
- Parsley and Chip: A young girl and her baby brother.
- Carl and Sara: A lumberjack and his wife.
- Clara, Nellie, Samantha, and Ms. Jolebiene: Friends of Mrs. Pepperpot
- Dr. Prøysen: The town doctor, he enjoys giving shots.
- Jahn: The town mailman
- Mrs. Vienne and Aurélie: A well-to-do woman and her daughter.
- Mint: A town store owner and Andy's father.
- Mrs. Red Top, Chickie, and Chirpie: A mother hen and her two chicks.
- Olina: a crow
- Michael: a fox
- King Jaw: a wolf
- Frogger: a frog
- Buzzy: a bee
- Black Jack: a one-eyed alley cat

== Release ==
The series has been licensed in North America by Discotek Media who released it on Blu-ray in Japanese with English subtitles, and the English dub on April 26, 2022.
