= Remi, Nobody's Girl =

Japanese anime television series

- 家なき子レミ
- Genre: Adventure, drama, historical, slice of life story
- Based on: Sans Famille by Hector Malot
- Screenplay by: Mayumi Koyama; Michiru Shimada
- Directed by: Kōzō Kusuba
- Country of origin: Japan
- Original language: Japanese
- No. of episodes: 26

Production
- Executive producer: Koichi Motohashi
- Producers: Madoka Takiyama (Fuji TV); Kenichi Sato
- Production companies: Fuji Television; Nippon Animation

Original release
- Network: FNS (Fuji TV)
- Release: September 1, 1996 – March 23, 1997

Remi, Nobody's Girl (Japanese: 家なき子レミ, Hepburn: Ie Naki Ko Remi) is a 26-episode Japanese anime television series by Nippon Animation, broadcast from 1996 to 1997 in Japan via Fuji Television network as a part of World Masterpiece Theater series. The show was directed by Kusuba Kouzo, written by Mayumi Koyama and Michiru Shimada, with character design by Ooshiro Masaru. It is an adaption of Sans Famille, an 1878 French novel written by Hector Malot, wherein the titular character is male.

The Japanese version of the show aired between September 1, 1996, and March 23, 1997. The series was later aired in English and other languages by Animax across its Southeast Asian and South Asian networks under the title Remi, Nobody's Girl. The show enjoyed wide popularity in the Arab world and was dubbed into Arabic by the Venus Centre and aired on the TV channel Spacetoon.

== Story ==
Remi, Nobody's Girl tells the story of Remi, a cheerful and tender-hearted young girl, who is a singer and lives in a French country town of Chavanon with her mother. One day her father returns to the town after a long period working away from home in a city. She discovers that she is a "foundling" or an abandoned child and was adopted by Mother Barberin. Her foster father, Jerome leaves to work in Paris and expects Mother Barberin to send Remi to the workhouse. He returns 10 years later and finds that Remi is still there, and becomes furious and Remi is almost sold to an evil slave trader.

It is Vitalis, a strolling entertainer, who helps Remi. Vitalis discovers her talent for singing and decides to take her in with his troupe. Remi starts her journey with Vitalis and his troupe of animals such as the monkey Joli-Coeur and the dogs Capi, Dolce, and Zelbino. On her journeys with Vitalis and his company, she must endure and overcome many difficulties while looking for her real family.

== Characters ==
Remi Barberin (レミ・バルブラン, Remi Baruburan)
Voiced by: Mitsuko Horie (Japanese); Andrea Kwan (English)
A bright and energetic 10-year-old girl, she was raised in a French village called Chavanon, but she does not know where she was born. She is also a singer.
Anne Barberin (アンヌ・バルブラン, Annu Baruburan)
Voiced by: Kumiko Hironaka
Her husband, Jerome, found Remi as an abandoned baby on a street corner of Paris. Afterward, Jerome leaves to work in Paris, and Anne raises Remi in secret.
Nana Barberin (ナナ・バルブラン, Nana Baruburan)
Voiced by: Junko Shimakata
Remi's foster little sister, she is the real child of Anne Barberin.
Jerome Barberin (ジェローム・バルブラン, Jerōmu Baruburan)
Voiced by: Masahiko Tanaka
Remi's foster father, Jerome found Remi as an abandoned baby. He goes away to Paris to work and expects his wife to get rid of Remi and send her to the workhouse. He returns ten years later because of a work injury and sells Remi to Pollinel for money.
Rosette (ルーセット, Rūsetto)
The family cow, which is sold as a payment.
Vitalis (ヴィタリス, Vitarisu)
Voiced by: Fubito Yamano (Japanese); Rik Thomas (English)
The owner of three dogs and a monkey, Vitalis is a performer who travels throughout France. He is skilled at playing the violin. At first glance, he appears frightful, but he is very kind. He taught Remi to read and write because she doesn't go to school.
Milligan (ミリガン婦人)
Voiced by: Eiko Yamada
An English lady who in Toulouse meets Remi and believes that Vitalis is innocent. She searches for her own daughter who was stolen not long after birth. Actually, it turned out that Remi was her real daughter.
Arthur (アーサー, Āsā)
Voiced by: Yumi Touma
Mrs. Milligan's son who is paralyzed and in a wheelchair. He becomes good friends with Remi and is also the brother of Remi.
Nelly (ネリー, Nerī)
Voiced by: Megumi Hayashibara
Mattia (マチア, Machia)
Voiced by: Shinobu Adachi
One of the boys who has lived with Gaspard, he is the leader of the children. He is good at playing the violin. His parents passed away when he was young before being in a circus performer, and then later sold to Gaspard. He became attached to Remi because of her kindness and gentleness. They promised to be together forever and in the last episode, he promised to work hard so that he can be in the same social status and ask Remi to be with him forever.
Lise (リーズ, Rīzu)
Voiced by: Mika Kanai
One of the Children who has lived with Gaspard, she is the Little Sister of Mattia.
Ricardo (リカルド, Rikarudo)
Voiced by: Hiro Yuuki
One of the boys who has lived with Gaspard, he is a friend of Mattia.
Marcel (マルセル, Maruseru)
Voiced by: Kyoko Tsuruno
Maria (マリア, Maria)
Voiced by: Kae Araki
She is Remi's good friend.
Gaspard (ガスパール, Gasupāru)
Voiced by: Nobuaki Fukuda
A cruel and greedy man, and the main antagonist in episodes 14 to 26, he forces homeless children to work for money and treats them like slaves. He collects money from them for his own purposes. He is based on Garofoli from the original story.
Capi (カピ, Capi)
A dog of Vitalis' company, he has a sense of responsibility and has very strong and leadership qualities. His name comes from the Italian word "capitale".
Zerbino (ゼルビーノ, Zerubino)
A dog of Vitalis' company, he is known as the cool one. Zerbino is the Italian word for "doormat".
Dolce (ドルチェ, Dorushi)
A dog of Vitalis' company, she becomes attached to everyone. The name "dolce" is the Italian word for "sweet".
Joli-Coeur (ジョリクール, Jorikūru)
Voiced by: Chie Sato
The monkey in Vitalis' company, he acts almost like a human and is a natural entertainer. He is also michievous.

== Episodes ==
Out of the 26 episodes – one was a recap episode and three were not aired.

1. La gara di canto (The Singing Contest)
2. Il signor Vitali (Signor Vitali)
3. La compagnia teatrale del signor Vitali (Signor Vitali's Troop)
4. Un regalo favoloso (A Wonderful Gift)
5. Il miracolo di Maria (Mary's Miracle)
6. La piccola Sara (The Little Sara)
7. Il rapimento di Cai (The Kidnapping of Capi)
8. L'incedio (The Fire)
9. Incontro col destino (The Meeting With Fate)
10. L'incidente di Arthur (Arthur's Incident)
11. Un nuovo viaggio (A New Journey)
12. Il sentiero di montagna (The Mountain Path, a recap episode)
13. Addio sulla neve (Farewell In The Snow)
14. Il viaggio solitario (The Solitary Journey)
15. Nuovi amici (New Friends)
16. La gattina smarrita (The Lost Kitten)
17. Persi nel labirinto (Lost In The Labirint)
18. Madre e figlia vicine e lontane (Mother And daughter Close and Distant)
19. La famiglia girovaga (The Traveling Family)
20. L'amica del cuore (The Bosom Friend)
21. Il violino (The Violin)
22. Paura nella minera (Fear In The Mine)
23. Il desiderio (The Wish)
24. Amore diviso in duo (Shared Love)
25. La fuga (The Escape)
26. La mamma (The Mother)

== Music ==
Opening theme

Ai ni Tsuite / "About Love" (愛について)

Lyrics: Masashi Sada
Composition and arrangement: Katsuhisa Hattori
Performance: Masashi Sada
Ending theme

Shiawase no Yokan / "Foreboding Happiness" (しあわせの予感)

Lyrics: Fumiko Okada
Composition and arrangement: Katsuhisa Hattori
Performance: Youca

== See also ==
- Sans Famille, the novel by Hector Malot on which this anime was based.
- Nobody's Boy: Remi, a 1977 TV anime by Tokyo Movie Shinsha in which Remi is a boy, just like in the novel Sans Familie.
