= Noel's Fantastic Trip =

- Directed by: Tsuneo Maeda
- Produced by: Kazuo Kambe; Iwao Takagi
- Music by: Iruka
- Distributed by: Toei Central Film
- Release date: April 29, 1983 (Japan); September 5, 1985 (USA)
- Running time: 72 minutes
- Country: Japan
- Language: Japanese

Noel's Fantastic Trip (ノエルの不思議な冒険, Noel no Fushigi na Bouken; lit. The Marvelous Adventures of Noel) is a 1983 Japanese animated film directed by Tsuneo Maeda and produced by Kazuo Kambe and Iwao Takagi. and animated by Iruka Office. The film was originally released on both LaserDisc and VHS format in Japan in 1983. It was dubbed in English and released on VHS in 1985 by RCA/Columbia Pictures Home Video and Magic Window.

The soundtrack for the film was originally produced by IRUKA but was rerecorded by Charlotte Russe Music for the English dub.

== Plot ==
The film is centered on Noel, a young girl and her dog, Pup, who both live on the Planet Noel. While relaxing, Noel seems to notice that the sun is too hot and encourages that it be fed ice cream to cool it down. The duo fly off in Noel's plane and begin making progress toward the sun.

On their way, the two of them spot a faint blinking light. As they head closer to the light, it begins to form the shape of a planet. The two make a landing on the planet, and, upon their arrival, the President steps out to welcome them and invites them to a special party, in which the Emcees show off the planet's most beautiful designs. This does not impress Noel, who states that it doesn't matter what clothes one is wearing, they will still be beautiful and loved. This idea coaxes the President and the citizens of the planet to take their clothes off, as does Noel. Pup gently reminds Noel of their trip to the sun, and the two resume their journey to meet him.

Upon their meeting, the sun is grateful of the ice cream Noel was able to deliver, and also warns of foul smog rising from some unknown planet. The two bid their farewells and attempt to pinpoint the source of the smog, but it quickly surrounds them. They escape underwater on another nearby planet. They appreciate the fine scenery underwater, but as they traverse further, they notice some of the sea life has fallen ill. Below them, on the floor of the sea, sludge begins to form.

== Voice Cast ==
| Character | Original | English |
|---|---|---|
| Noel | Iruka | Corinne Orr |
| Kisonosuke | Touma | Lionel Wilson |
| O-Hi-sama | Asei Kobayashi | Ray Owens |
| Janitor | Bekako Katsura | Unknown |
| Kikazari Minister | Hachirō Azuma | Unknown |
| Kikazari Advisor | Kamekichi | Unknown |
| Su-san the Whale | Kenji Niinuma | Unknown |
| Kikazari Chairman | Koutaro Yamamoto | Unknown |
| Sakikawa no Konkichi | Kumiko Ohba | Unknown |
| Kikazari Chairman | Panda Yamada | Unknown |
| Old Superman | Takashi Nishioka | Unknown |
| Smog Boss | Tsurube Shōfukutei | Ray Owens |
