= Sans Famille =

1878 French novel

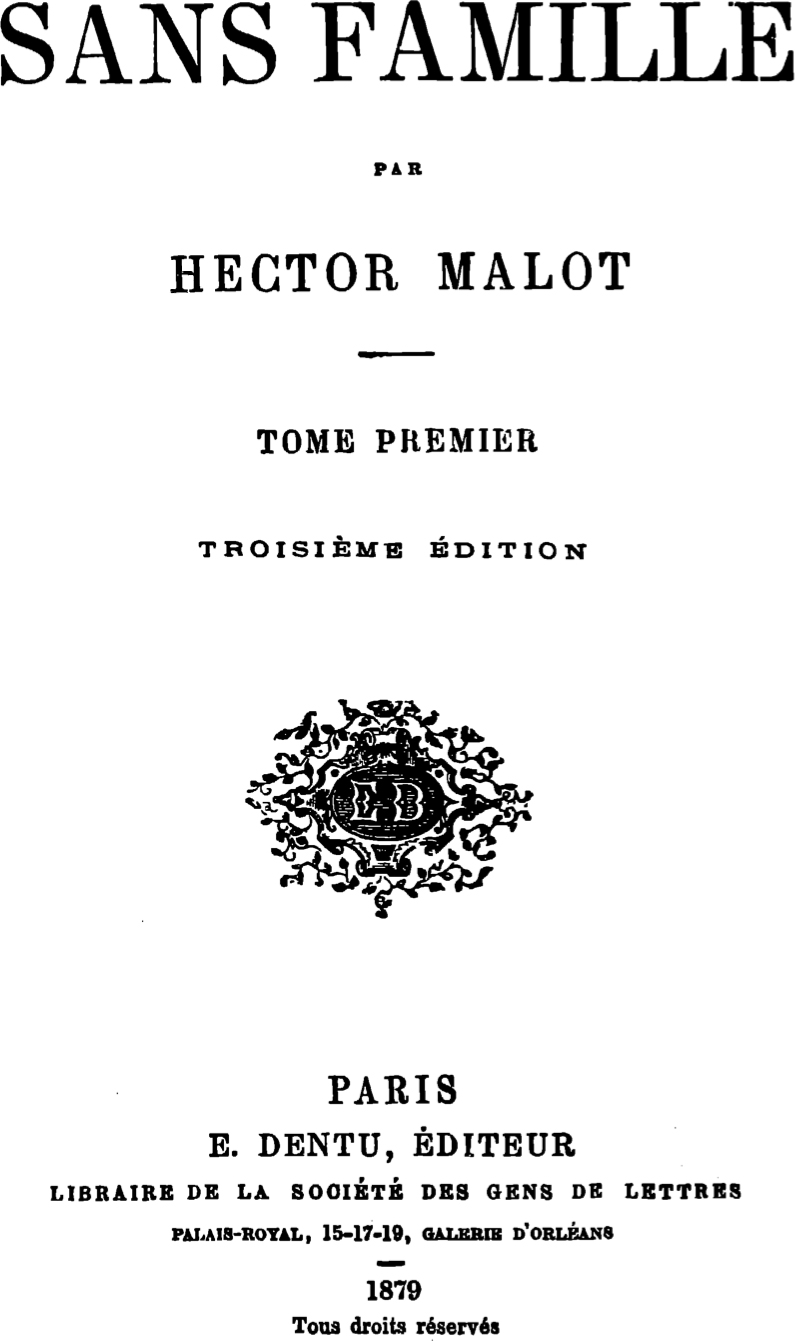
- Title page of the third edition
- Author: Hector Malot
- Illustrator: Émile Bayard (1880)
- Language: French
- Genre: Novel, Bildungsroman
- Publisher: Édouard Dentu
- Publication date: December 4, 1877 – April 19, 1878 (magazine); 1878 (novel)
- Publication place: France
- Media type: Print (hardcover)
- Pages: 372
- Text: Sans Famille at Wikisource

Sans Famille (lit. 'Without Family'; English: Nobody's Boy) is an 1878 French novel by Hector Malot. The most recent English translation is Alone in the World by Adrian de Bruyn in 2007. The novel was reportedly inspired by the Italian street musicians of the 19th century, in particular the harpists from Viggiano, Basilicata.

== Plot ==
=== First volume ===
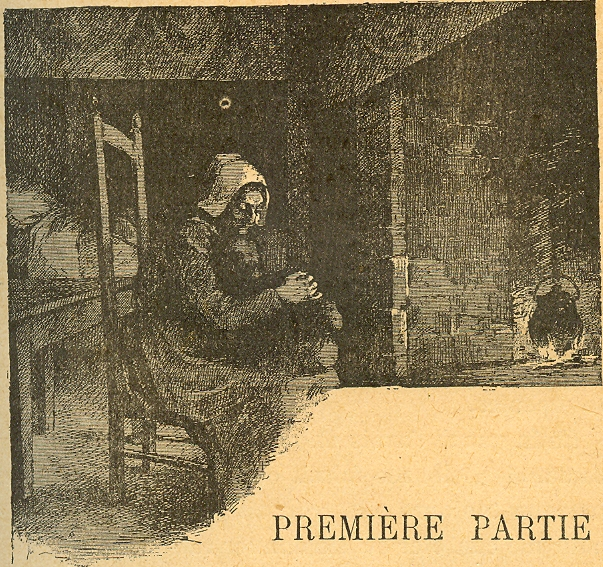
Sans Famille, first volume (by Léon-Alexandre Blanchot (aka Ivan Loewitz)

==== In Chavanon and Paris ====
One day, Jérôme Barberin finds a baby boy in Paris. The boy wears very fine clothes, so apparently his parents are rich. Barberin offers to take care of the child, hoping to get a good reward. He gives the boy to his wife, and calls him Rémi.

Barberin gets injured in an accident. He blames his employer and hopes to receive financial compensation in a trial. The trial costs a lot of money, and Barberin tells his wife to sell her cow (her main source of income) and to get rid of Rémi. She does the former.

The story proper starts when Rémi is eight years old. Barberin comes home unexpectedly, bitter and penniless, having lost his trial. He sees that Rémi is still there and decides to get rid of him when he meets a travelling artist, Signor Vitalis, in the local pub, who travels with three dogs Capi, Zerbino and Dolce - and a Capuchin monkey, Joli-Cœur. Vitalis offers to take Rémi on as an apprentice for money.

==== Travelling with Vitalis ====
Rémi leaves his childhood home, without even a chance to say goodbye to his foster mother (who would have done anything to prevent the transaction) and starts a journey on the roads of France. Vitalis is a kind man, certainly better company than Barberin, and teaches Rémi to play the harp and to read.

They travel west, via Murat (where Vitalis tells him of the Prince of Naples, brother-in-law of Napoleon, who came from there). Next stop is Ussel where Rémi is outfitted for his new life, including shoes, which he has never owned before. The first big city going south is Bordeaux, after which they cut right through the morass of Les Landes towards Pau.

==== Meeting the Milligans ====
When they are in Toulouse, Vitalis is put in jail after an incident with a policeman who is rough with Rémi. It is not easy for a ten-year-old to feed himself and four animals under his care, and they nearly starve, when they meet the Swan, a little river ship owned by Mrs. Milligan and her ill son Arthur. Rémi is taken in to entertain the sick boy, and he becomes almost part of the family. They travel towards Montpellier and the Mediterranean via the Canal du Sud. Rémi learns the story about her dead husband and brother-in-law, who under English law was to inherit all of his brother's fortune if he died childless. An earlier child had disappeared and was never found (under the charge of this James Milligan) but soon after the husband's death, Arthur was born.

Two months later, Vitalis is released from jail, and Mrs. Milligan pays for him to take the train to Cette. Rémi and the Milligans would like to stay together, but Vitalis thinks it is better for Rémi to be free, and so they say goodbye. Mrs. Milligan however thinks that Vitalis is a very kind and honest man.

==== Three animals of Vitalis die ====
They travel via Tarascon, Montélimar, Valence, Tournon, Vienne, Lyon, Dijon, and Chalon on the way to Paris, but winter catches up to them 30 miles from Troyes, and in a snowstorm Zerbino and Dolce are attacked by wolves in the woods, and Joli-Cœur catches pneumonia.

In an attempt to raise money for the doctor, Rémi and Vitalis give a performance and Vitalis sings. Rémi has never before heard Vitalis sing, and is not the only one who is bewildered: a young and apparently rich lady tells Vitalis that she is amazed to hear his wonderful voice. Vitalis reacts angrily. He explains his skill to the lady by telling her that he used to be a singer's servant. He shows no appreciation when the lady gives a gold coin to Capi. They return to Joli-Cœur with the money, but the little monkey is dead.

==== Garofoli ====
They now continue their journey to Paris. Vitalis decides to leave Rémi with another padrone for the winter, while he trains new animals with the proceeds. This padrone is Garofoli, who keeps a group of boys sold by their impoverished parents, now working for him. Garofoli is not home, and Vitalis tells Rémi to wait there, and he will be back soon. Rémi passes two horrible hours in the Rue Lourcine house - waiting for Garofoli and talking to an ill-looking boy, Mattia, who keeps house because Garofoli believes him too stupid and incapable of working outside. He also keeps the soup pot locked so that Mattia could not eat from it.

When the other boys and Garofoli return, Rémi witnesses how terribly Garofoli abuses those who do not bring home the amount of money required: he beats and starves them. When Vitalis comes back and sees the boys being flogged, he tells Garofoli that he could go to the police, but Garofoli threatens back to tell "some people just one name which will make Vitalis red from shame". Vitalis takes the wondering and grateful Rémi away; this act of love costs Vitalis his life. That night, unable to find a place to stay, Vitalis and Rémi collapse in a snowstorm under a fence after fruitlessly searching for access to a stone quarry for shelter.

==== With the Acquins ====
Rémi next wakes in a bed, with people standing around him: a man, the gardener Pierre Acquin, two boys Alexis and Benjamin, and two girls Étienette (Martha) and little mute Lise, who is about 5–6 years old, and watches Rémi with "speaking eyes". Rémi learns the terrible truth: Vitalis is dead. In an attempt to discover his identity, the police officers take Rémi to Garofoli, who reveals the truth: Vitalis was once the famous Italian singer Carlo Balzani. When he aged, he lost his voice and was too proud to sing in lesser venues. He decided to disappear, changing his identity to Vitalis.

The family take Rémi and Capi in. Rémi especially adores Lise, teaching her to read and playing the harp for her. Lise loves a Neapolitan song in particular. Rémi becomes a gardener, and two years of hard work and merry Sundays follow. A terrible hailstorm destroys the glass of their greenhouse, and Pierre Acquin is in debt to the man he borrowed from to buy his business. He cannot pay and has to enter a debtor's prison. The children are distributed to uncles and aunts in across several French towns. While the children insist that Rémi also belongs to the family, none of the uncles and aunts are willing or able to take him in. Brokenhearted and vowing to his adoptive siblings to visit and bring their father news from them, Rémi takes his harp and Capi and again sets out for the road.

=== Second volume ===
==== Mattia ====
Rémi decides to head southeast towards Fontainebleau but hasn't gone long when he meets a companion, Mattia, the boy from Garofoli’s place, starving near a church on the streets of Paris. Garofoli is in prison for beating another boy to death. Mattia pleads with Rémi to take him into his troupe but Rémi fears Mattia might die of hunger with him as much as alone. Mattia convinces him that two will never die of hunger because one helps the other. Thus, the "Rémi troupe" consists now of two, twelve-year-old musicians and a dog.

Mattia turns out to be a gifted violinist and able to play other instruments too; he had also learnt some tricks while working some time in a circus. The boys do well in the spring at weddings and festivals, their talents are appreciated. Rémi plans to visit Mother Barberin and buy her a cow as a replacement for the one she was forced to sell at the start of the story.

==== Mining ====
Since a cow is expensive, Rémi plans a route via Corbeil, Montargis, Gien, Bourges, Saint-Amand and Montluçon where they make a lot of money on their way to visit Alexis, who now lives with his Uncle Gaspard (Father Acquin's brother) in the mining town of Varses, and works in the mine with his uncle. When Alexis is wounded and unable to work for a while, Rémi volunteers to replace him. One of the miners is nicknamed "Magister", who is an old and wise man. He becomes a good friend and he explains the history of coal.

One day, the mine is flooded by the Divonne River, which flows overhead. Seven miners, including Uncle Gaspard, Magister and Rémi, find shelter but are trapped. They are waiting to be rescued, but have no idea of the amount of time that they pass in hunger and fear. One of the men confesses a crime, blames himself for the disaster, and commits suicide. They end up spending a fortnight underground and at last are saved. Capi is mad with happiness, while Mattia is in tears, saying he never believed Rémi could be dead, and Rémi is proud of his friend's strong belief in him. This incident shows the terrible state of child labour in 19th-century France.

Rémi wants Mattia to learn music and they visit a barber/musician. Mr. Espinassous is amazed by Mattia's great talent and tries to convince him to stay and learn, but Mattia does not want to leave Rémi.

==== A cow for Mother Barberin ====
The boys now head on to visit Rémi's foster mother. First, they decide to visit Clermont Ferrand, and southwesterly, the mineral spa towns of Saint-Nectaire, Mont-Dore, Royat, and Bourboule where they can make good money to buy the cow for Mother Barberin. When they pass through Ussel, not far from Chavanon, they make sure that they will not buy a bad cow, and ask a vet for help. The vet is very friendly and the boys buy a wonderful cow.

In the next town, the boys are accused of stealing the cow, and recount their story to the mayor. The mayor knows Mother Barberin, he heard about the accident in the Varses mine, and he is willing to believe that the boys are honest. To make sure, the vet is called to testify, and the boys resume their journey.

Rémi and Mother Barberin finally meet again, and she says Jérôme is in Paris looking for Rémi as his real parents appear to be searching for him. Mother Barberin knows very little because Jérôme never told her any details, and Rémi is eager to know his real parents. Rémi and Mattia decide to return to Paris and find Barberin. On the way to Paris, they pass through Dreuzy, where they pay a visit to Lise Acquin. Rémi and Lise are very fond of each other.

==== The Driscolls ====
When the boys arrive in Paris, they learn that Jérôme Barberin has died. Rémi writes a letter to Mother Barberin, who replies and encloses a letter Jérôme had sent before he died. It mentions the address of a lawyer's office in London, which is in charge of the search for Rémi. The boys take a boat to London, where they are led straight to a family they believe to be Rémi's, surnamed Driscoll.

Rémi is terribly disappointed: the Driscolls are cold to him and his father keeps the boys locked up. They turn out to be a band of thieves and use Capi to help them in their work.

The Driscolls receive a visitor, a man who seems interested in Rémi, but Rémi does not understand English well enough. The visitor does not meet Mattia, but Mattia overhears their conversation. James Milligan appears to be Arthur's uncle and hopes Arthur will die, so that he will inherit the fortune of his late brother. The boys agree that Mrs. Milligan must be warned, but they have no idea where to find her. Mattia meets Bob, a clown and musician from the circus. Bob turns out to be a fine friend.

==== Searching for the Milligans ====
When Rémi is accused of a robbery committed by the Driscolls, Bob and Mattia help him escape from prison. With the help of Bob's brother, a sailor, they return to France to search for Mrs. Milligan, in order to warn her about her brother-in-law, James. They start by travelling up the Seine, since the Swan is a remarkable boat; they soon hear that people have seen her and follow the trail along rivers and canals.

On their way they pass once more through Dreuzy where they hope to meet Lise again, but they hear her uncle has died and that a kind English lady, who journeyed on a boat, has offered to take care of Lise. Rémi and Mattia trace the Swan across France until they are near the Swiss border. They find the boat deserted which was unable to journey further up the river, and the family continued their journey by coach, possibly to Vevey. When they get to the town where "the English woman with the ill boy and the mute girl" are supposed to be, they start singing near every fence.

One day, Rémi sings his Neapolitan song, and hears a scream and a weak voice that continues the song. They run to the voice and find Lise, whose voice has returned to her when she heard her long-lost Rémi. The boys discover James Milligan is there too, and Rémi is afraid to meet him, but James does not know Mattia so he is able to tell Mrs. Milligan their story. Mrs. Milligan guesses that Rémi might be her lost eldest son, Richard, but tells Mattia to keep it secret until she is sure. She arranges for the boys to stay in a hotel, where they can have plenty of food, comfortable beds, and are visited by a barber and a tailor.

==== Home ====
After a few days, Mrs. Milligan invites the boys to her villa where they meet Mother Barberin, whom Mrs. Milligan sent for. Mother Barberin shows Rémi's baby clothes which Mrs. Milligan recognises as the clothes her boy wore when he was stolen. Mrs. Milligan happily declares that Rémi is her son, to join his "mother, brother and those who loved you in your misery (Lise and Mattia)". It becomes clear that Mr. Driscoll had stolen the boy as a job for James Milligan.

The story has a happy ending: Rémi finds his biological family, and discovers he is heir to a fortune, enabling him to help those who previously helped him. Mattia's dear little sister Cristina is sent for from Italy, and they all grow up together. Arthur gets well and becomes a gentleman athlete, Mattia a famous violinist. Vitalis is posthumously honored and remembered properly as Carlo Balzani. With the Acquin family reunited after their father Pierre is finally freed from the debtor’s prison, Rémi marries Lise and they have a son named Mattia, and Mother Barberin becomes his nanny. While the Driscoll family broke apart from their crimes, Rémi was relieved that Kate's grandfather continued raising her.

The book ends with the score of the Neapolitan song.

== Publication history ==
The work was first serialized in the newspaper Le Siècle from December 4, 1877, to April 19, 1878, and was later published in the same year as a novel in two volumes by Édouard Dentu. In 1880, an illustrated edition was released, with illustrations by Émile Bayard.

== Media adaptations ==
=== Film and television ===
Several films and TV shows were made from the novel:

- Sans famille (France, 1934)
- Senza famiglia (Italy, 1946)
- Le Théâtre de la jeunesse: Sans famille (made for TV, France, 1965)
- Nobody's Child (苦兒流浪記) (Hong Kong, 1961)
- Chibikko Remi to Meiken Kapi (Japan, 1970) – feature film by Toei Animation
- Nobody's Boy: Remi (Ie Naki Ko) (Japan, 1977-78) – 51-episode anime television series by Tokyo Movie Shinsha
- Manga Fairy Tales of the World (Manga Sekai Mukashi Banashi) (Japan, 1976-79) - 2-part episode anime anthology series by Dax International
- Sans famille (France, 1981) – 6-part TV series by TF1 starring Petula Clark and Fabrice Josso
- Bez Semyi (Soviet Union, 1984)
- Remi, Nobody's Girl (家なき子レミ, Ie Naki Ko Remi) (Japan) – 26-episode anime television series, the final installment in Nippon Animation's World Masterpiece Theatre series. This version made major changes to the storyline, transforming Remi (voiced by pop star/voice actress Mitsuko Horie) into a girl and making her a child singer. The series was later translated into English by the anime television network, Animax, who aired the complete series (all 26 episodes) across its respective networks worldwide, including Southeast Asia and South Asia.
- Sans famille / Das Findelkind (F/D/CZ, 2000)
- Remi, Nobody's Boy (2018) directed by Antoine Blossier, starring Maleaume Paquin and Daniel Auteuil.

=== Comics ===
Between 1958 and 1959 Dutch comics artist Piet Wijn adapted the story into a comic strip, which was prepublished in the Rotterdamsch Nieuwsblad. In 1979 he made another adaptation of the same novel, which was prepublished in the Dutch Disney weekly Donald Duck comic.

=== Music ===
In November 2021, Dutch singer-songwriter Ruurd Woltring (known from his collaboration with Dutch band Epica) released a single called "Someone Like You", which is loosely based on the story.
