= Hector Malot =

French writer (1830-1907)

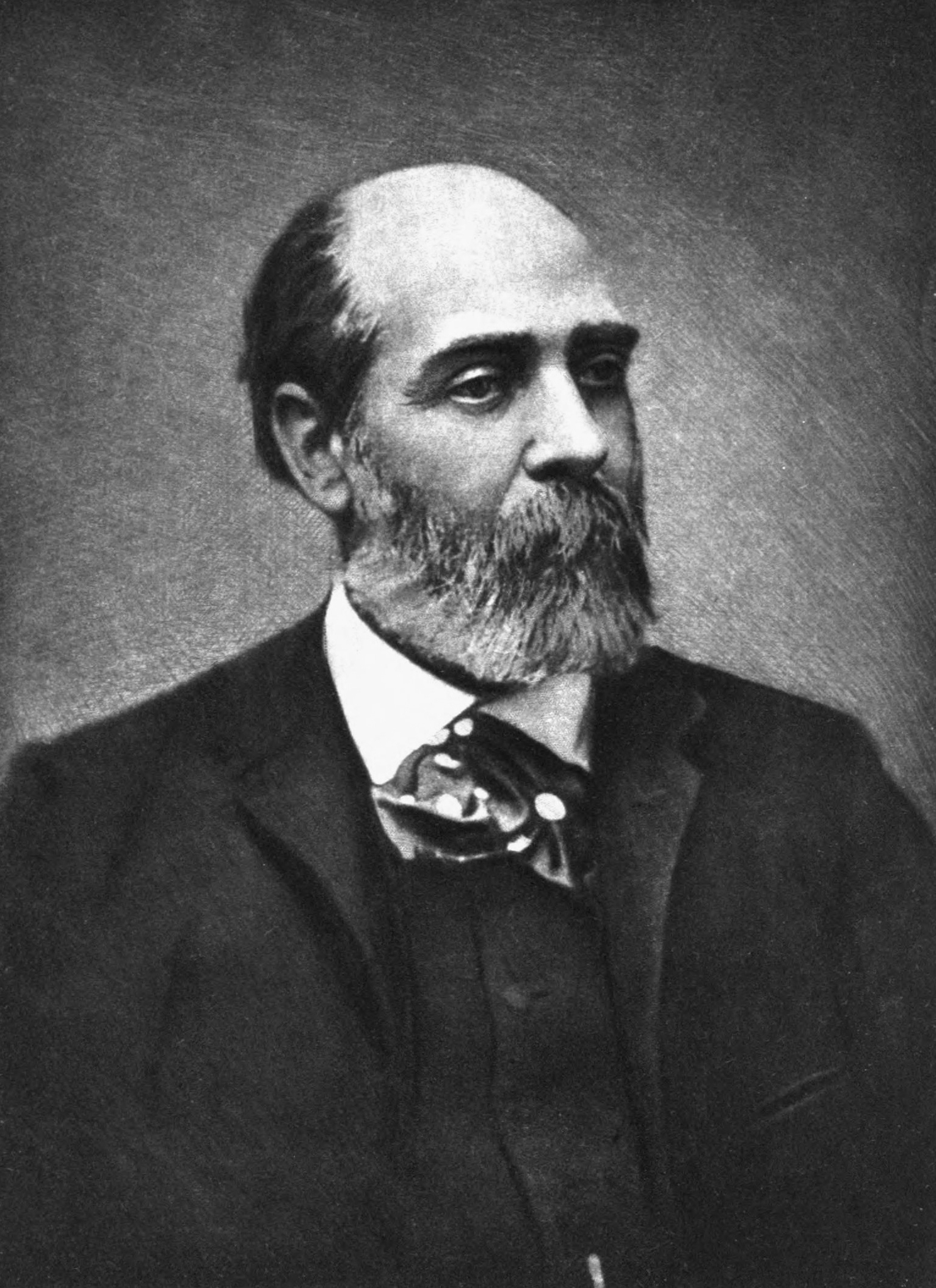
- Born: 20 May 1830; La Bouille, France
- Died: 18 July 1907 (aged 77); Fontenay-sous-Bois, France

Hector-Henri Malot (Hector Malot) (French pronunciation: [ɛktɔʁ malo]; 20 May 1830 – 18 July 1907) was a French writer born in La Bouille, Seine-Maritime. He studied law in Rouen and Paris, but eventually literature became his passion. He worked as a dramatic critic for Lloyd Francais and as a literary critic for L'Opinion Nationale.

His first book, published in 1859, was Les Amants. In total Malot wrote over 70 books. By far his most famous book is Sans Famille (Nobody's Boy, 1878), which deals with the travels of the young orphan Remi, who is sold to the street musician Vitalis at age 8. Sans Famille gained fame as a children's book, though it was not originally intended as such.

== Personal life ==
=== Birth ===
Hector Malot's parents were Marie-Anne-Victoire Le Bourgeois and Jean Baptiste Malot. They got married on September 30, 1826, each for the second time.

From the union was born a child named Victor who died at a young age. On May 20, 1830 Hector was born in the family home of La Bouille, on the banks of the Seine.

A few hours after his birth, a sailboat moored in front of the house suddenly veers dangerously towards it. It broke the window of the newborn’s room with its bowsprit. When a crowd gathered they found little Hector sleeping peacefully as if nothing happened, which is seen as an omen of an unusual destiny.

=== Childhood and adolescence ===
==== From La Bouille to Bosc-Bénard-Commin ====
Hector spends the first years of his childhood in La Bouille. He observes the ships loading or unloading their cargoes, those leaving for distant destinations; he observes the passage of the ferry, the comings and goings of the stagecoaches, the customers of the inns, etc.

In October 1835 Hector’s family leaves the banks of the Seine to settle in Bosc-Bénard-Commin in the department of Eure. This move follows Jean-Baptiste Malot’s transfer of his La Bouille study to his son-in-law. He becomes a justice of the peace for the canton of Bourgtheroulde.

This new environment allows for Hector’s taste of reading. He stays locked up for hours devouring books, preferring to abandon his French lessons to read Racine, Lesage or even Molière.

Hector begins to appreciate life in the countryside and indulges in numerous escapades during which he “discovered nature, the cycle of seasons and crops, became interested in trees, flowers, insects, animals..”. He developed a taste for nature and botany which would last his entire life.

==== Boarding school in Rouen ====
At age 9, given the poor progress Hector shows in his education, he’s sent to boarding school in Rouen by his father. Marie-Anne-Victoire does everything possible to delay this deadline, but Jean-Baptiste’s decision is final. Hector departs in October 1839.

Hector arrives in Rouen at the Heudron and Lamardeley institute, attended mainly by the sons of well-off peasants and notables of the region. Here he befriends future literary critic Jules Levallois.

Three years later, in 1842, Hector attends the Corneille high school in Rouen but hardly excels in his studies, suffering from a school system in which he feels he cannot express himself. He prefers history class, with a teacher he considers an original, free-spirited person.

=== Early writing and family life ===
==== Arrival in Paris ====
Hector Malot arrived in Paris in 1847 when he was 17 years old. He continued his studies there at the Condorcet high school where he obtained his baccalaureate after two years. In accordance with his father’s wishes, he began studying law which he continued for three years. However, in 1853, against the wishes of his father, he decided to abandon the legal path in order to devote himself to a literary career.

In the years that followed, Hector tried in vain to have a first play performed. To ensure his livelihood, he wrote a few articles, notably in Journal pour tous, where Jules Simon hired him for his knowledge of botany.

==== From Moisselles to Fontenay-sous-Bois ====
Busy on one hand with his work as a journalist and distracted on the other by Parisian life, Hector Malot found himself unable to advance the writing of his first novel. He therefore decided to retire to his parents, who left Normandy and settled in Moisselles, near Écouen, in Val-d’Oise. Back in the countryside he could devote himself entirely to his writing, resulting in his first novel, Les Amants. It was released in 1859 when Hector had become a journalist at L’Opinion notationale and enjoyed great success.

In October 1862, Marie-Anne-Victoire, Hector’s mother, dies. This loss upset the writer greatly. He later attempted to exorcise this episode through the writing of Romain Kalbris, a novel in which a dying mother awaits the return of her sailor son.

In 1865 Hector builds at 3 avenue de la Dame-Blanche in Fontenay-souls-Boris, a wooden chalet that he would live in until the end of his life. He chose the location with care and accuracy: at the intersection of avenue de la Dame-Blanche and avenue de Fontenay, near the station, facing the Boris de Vincennes. This to ensure he could regularly go to Paris or neighboring stations for the walks he enjoyed.

His father, Jean-Baptiste, then a widower for almost two years, moved in and remained there until his death in October 1866. Shortly after, in 1867, Hector married Anna Dariès in Montgeron, with whom he has a daughter, Lucie in 1868. When Anna died in 1880, Hector remarried to Marthe Oudinot de La Faverie, age 31, with whom he made numerous trips.

=== Publication of Sans Famille ===
In 1878 Hector Malot published his most famous work: Sans Famille (literal translation: Without Family but mostly known as Nobody’s Boy). This novel tells the adventures of the foundling, Rémi, who is sold by his adoptive father to a street musician named Vitalis. Traveling the French and later English roads, Rémi works in different professions and meets many people before setting out to find his biological family.

Hector Malot thought of and wrote this work for his daughter, Lucie. He begins the novel with a dedication to her.

=== End of career and retirement ===
In 1887, the Journal de Rouen published in its daily edition the novel Ghislaine in serial form, paying homage to Malot’s Norman roots.

In 1893, a year after writing En famille (loosely translated as Nobody’s Girl), Malot’s granddaughter Perrine was born, sharing the name of the heroine of the novel. He proves to be an attentive and loving grandfather, curious to note the development he observes of the child.

In 1894 Malot published his last novel, Amours de vieux. He decides to put an end to his literary career and retire to his home in Fontenay-sous-Boris where he plans new trips. However, two years later, he publishes an autobiographical work, Les Romans de mes romans (The Novel of my Novels). He also wrote, shortly before his death, a text entitled Le Mousse, which would only appear posthumously in 1997. These last two works are dedicated to Perrine.

Suffering from paralysis since 1905, Hector Malot died on July 18, 1907 in Fontenay-sous-Bois. He is buried there in the cemetery where he rests in the company of his first wife Anna, his father Jean-Baptiste, his daughter Lucie, his sister Prudence and his son-in-law, General Mesple.

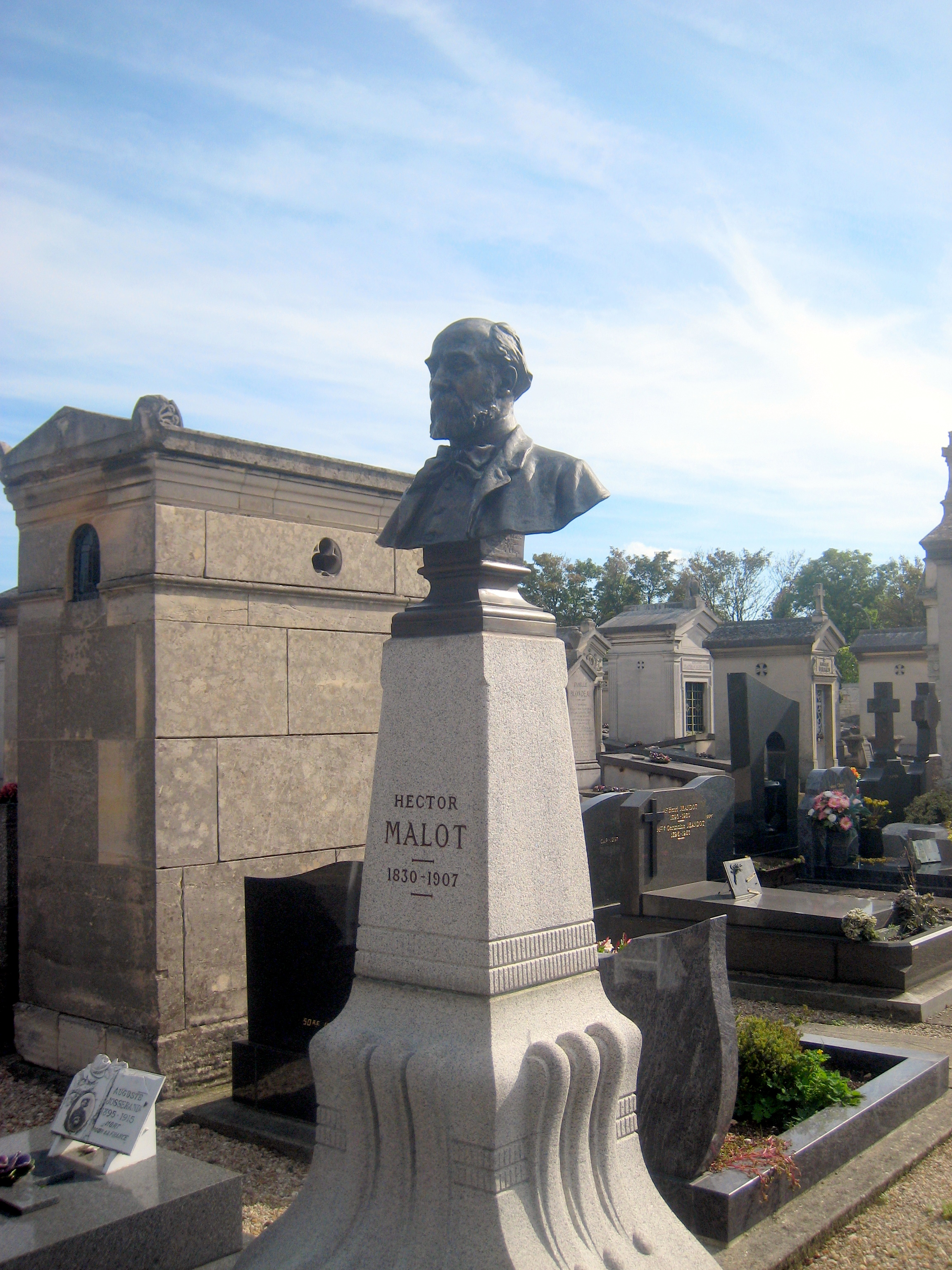
Hector Malot's grave in Fontenay-sous-Bois

== Works by Malot ==
- Victimes d'Amour (a trilogy) encompassing:
  - Les Amants (1859)
  - Les Époux (1865)
  - Les Enfants (1866)
- Un Beau frère (1869)
- Madame Obernin (1870)
- Le Docteur Claude (1879)
- Justice (1889)
- L'amour Dominateur (1896)

Books for children include:

- Les Aventures de Romain Kalbris (1869)
- Sans famille (1878)

== Legacy ==
Three anime series have been made based on Malot's works:

- Nobody's Boy: Remi (1977, 51 episodes, based on Sans Famille)
- The Story of Perrine (1978, 53 episodes, based on En Famille)
- Remi, Nobody's Girl (1996, 26 episodes, based on Sans Famille with gender swap)

Sans Famille has been adapted into film in France numerous times throughout the years, most recently in the 2018 film Remi, Nobody’s Boy by Antoine Blossier.
