= List of animated television series of 1983 =

A list of animated television series first aired in 1983.

Animated television series first aired in 1983
Title	Episodes	Country	Year	Notes	Technique
The Adventures of Portland Bill	25	United Kingdom	1983–86		Stop-Motion
Alvin and the Chipmunks (1983)	102	United States	1983–90		Traditional
Around the World with Willy Fog	26	Spain	1983		Traditional
Bananaman	40	United Kingdom	1983–86		Traditional
The Biskitts	13	United States	1983		Traditional
Braingames	6	United States	1983–85		Traditional
The Charlie Brown and Snoopy Show	18	United States	1983–85	Version of Peanuts.	Traditional
Donald Duck Presents	71	United States	1983–92		Traditional
Doris	40	United Kingdom	1983		Cut-Outs
Draky le Vampire		France	1983		Traditional
The Dukes	20	United States	1983	Spin-off of The Dukes of Hazzard.	Traditional
Dungeons & Dragons	27	United States	1983–85		Traditional
G.I. Joe: A Real American Hero (1983)	95	United States	1983–86		Traditional
Good Morning, Mickey!	80	United States	1983–92	Package series	Traditional
Gran	13	United Kingdom	1983		Stop-Motion
He-Man and the Masters of the Universe (1983)	130	United States	1983–85		Traditional
Henry's Cat	51	United Kingdom	1983–93		Traditional
The Insensitive Princess	13	France	1983		Traditional
Inspector Gadget (1983)	86	United States; France; Canada (season 1)	1983–85		Traditional
Little Miss	13	United Kingdom	1983		Traditional
The Littles	29	United States	1983–85		Traditional
Mister T	30	United States	1983–85		Traditional
Monchhichis	13	United States	1983	The Monchhichis/Little Rascals/Richie Rich Show segment.	Traditional
The Monchhichis/Little Rascals/Richie Rich Show	13	United States	1983–84		Traditional
Moschops	13	United Kingdom	1983		Stop-Motion
Mr. Hiccup	39	Italy	1983–84		Traditional
The New Scooby and Scrappy-Doo Show	13	United States	1983	Spin-off of Scooby-Doo, Where Are You! and Scooby-Doo and Scrappy-Doo.	Traditional
Przygód kilka wróbla Ćwirka	39	Poland	1983–89		Traditional
Rubik, the Amazing Cube	13	United States	1983		Traditional
Saturday Supercade	26	United States	1983–84		Traditional
Simon le Petit Démon		France	1983		Traditional
Terrahawks	39	United Kingdom	1983–86		Live-Action
Victor & Maria	26	United Kingdom	1983		Cut-Outs
Yakari	52	France	1983–84		Traditional

Anime television series first aired in 1983
Title	Episodes	Country	Year	Notes	Technique
Armored Trooper Votoms	52	Japan	1983–84		Anime
Aura Battler Dunbine	49	Japan	1983–84		Anime
Captain	26	Japan	1983		Anime
Captain Tsubasa	128	Japan	1983–86		Anime
Cat's Eye	73	Japan	1983–85		Anime
Creamy Mami, the Magic Angel	52	Japan	1983–84		Anime
Eagle Sam	51	Japan	1983–84		Anime
Fushigi no Kuni no Alice	52	Japan	1983–84		Anime
Galactic Whirlwind Sasuraiger	43	Japan	1983–84		Anime
Genesis Climber MOSPEADA	25	Japan	1983–84		Anime
Ginga Hyōryū Vifam	46	Japan	1983–84		Anime
Igano Kabamaru	24	Japan	1983–84		Anime
Itadakiman	20	Japan	1983		Anime
Kinnikuman	137	Japan	1983–86		Anime
Lady Georgie	45	Japan	1983–84		Anime
Lightspeed Electroid Albegas	45	Japan	1983–84		Anime
Love Me, My Knight	42	Japan	1983–84		Anime
Mīmu Iro Iro Yume no Tabi	127	Japan	1983–85		Anime
Mirai Keisatsu Urashiman	50	Japan	1983		Anime
Miyuki	37	Japan	1983–84		Anime
Mrs. Pepper Pot	130	Japan	1983–84		Anime
Nanako SOS	39	Japan	1983		Anime
Perman	526	Japan	1983–85		Anime
Plawres Sanshiro	37	Japan	1983–1984		Anime
Psycho Armor Govarian	26	Japan	1983		Anime
Serendipity the Pink Dragon	26	Japan	1983		Anime
Special Armored Battalion Dorvack	36	Japan	1983–84		Anime
Stop!! Hibari-kun!	35	Japan	1983–84		Anime
Story of the Alps: My Annette	48	Japan	1983		Anime
Super Dimension Century Orguss	35	Japan	1983–84		Anime
Superbook II	26	Japan	1983		Anime
Taotao	52	Japan	1983–85		Anime
The Yearling	52	Japan	1983–85		Anime

== See also ==
- List of animated feature films of 1983
- List of Japanese animation television series of 1983
