= List of animated feature films of 1983 =

This is a list of animated feature films first released in 1983.

== List ==
Title	Country	Director	Production company	Animation technique	Format	Notes	Release date	Duration
Abra Cadabra	Australia	Alex Stitt	Adams Packer Film Productions	Traditional	Theatrical	First ever animated feature to be made in 3D.	July 1983	84 minutes
Aesop's Fables まんがイソップ物語 (Manga Aesop Monogatari)	Japan	Norio Hikone	Toei Animation	Traditional	Theatrical		March 13, 1983	61 minutes
Barefoot Gen はだしのゲン (Hadashi no Gen)	Japan	Mori Masaki	Madhouse	Traditional	Theatrical		July 21, 1983	85 minutes
Beauty and the Beast	United States	Rudy Larriva	Ruby-Spears	Traditional	Television special	Originally aired as the 30th installment of the CBS animated anthology series Famous Classic Tales (1970–1984).	November 25, 1983	45 minutes
Boi Aruá; Aruá Ox	Brazil	Francisco Liberato	Seriarte Filmes	Traditional	Theatrical			85 minutes
The Boulugres; Les Boulugres	France	Jean Hurtado	Cinemation-Manuel Otero	Traditional	Theatrical			75 minutes
Chohabgeum roboteu SOLAR I.II.III 초합금 로보트 쏠라 원.투.드리 (Super Alloy Robot SOLAR One.Two.Three)	South Korea	Kim Cheong-gi	Seoul Donghwa Production	Traditional	Theatrical		February 24, 1983	72 minutes
Computer Haekjeonham Pokpadaejakjeon 콤퓨터핵전함 폭파대작전 (Computer Nuclear Battleship Bombing Operation)	South Korea	Jeong Su-yong	Namyang Planning	Traditional	Theatrical	Later dubbed into English in 1987 by Joseph Lai under the title of Savior of the Earth.	August 12, 1983	65 minutes
Crusher Joe クラッシャージョウ (Kurasshā Jō)	Japan	Yoshikazu Yasuhiko	Studio Nue; Nippon Sunrise	Traditional	Theatrical		March 12, 1983	125 minutes
Daffy Duck's Fantastic Island	United States	Friz Freleng; Chuck Jones	Warner Bros. Animation	Traditional	Theatrical; Compilation film	Film compiled from theatrical animated shorts; fifth of six Looney Tunes compilation feature films	August 5, 1983	78 minutes
The Daltons on the Loose; Les Dalton en cavale	France	Morris, William Hanna, Joseph Barbera, Ray Patterson	Hanna-Barbera; Gaumont; FR3	Traditional	Theatrical; Compilation film	Film compiled from episodes 1 ("Ma Dalton"), 3 ("The Daltons in the Blizzard"), and 6 ("The Daltons Are Redeemed") of the television series, which aired from October 15, 1984, until April 8, 1985.	September 30, 1983	81 minutes
David & Goliath 다윗과 골리앗 (Dawitgwa Golliat)	South Korea	Kim Cheong-gi	Daewon Donghwa	Traditional	Theatrical		December 21, 1983	74 minutes
A Disney Channel Christmas!!!!	United States		Walt Disney Productions; The Disney Channel	Traditional/Live action	Television special Compilation film	Compilation of animated/live action Disney film clips and cartoons.		90 minutes
A Disney Halloween	United States		Walt Disney Productions; The Disney Channel	Traditional/Live action	Television special Compilation film	Compilation of animated/live action Disney film clips and cartoons.	October 1, 1983	90 minutes
Document: Taiyō no Kiba Daguramu ドキュメント 太陽の牙ダグラム (Document: Fang of the Sun Dougram)	Japan	Ryousuke Takahashi	Shochiku; Nippon Sunrise	Traditional	Theatrical; Compilation film		July 9, 1983	80 minutes
Doctor Mambo & the Phantom Thief Jibako: With Love from Space どくとるマンボウ&怪盗ジバコ 宇宙より愛をこめて!! (Doctor Mambo & Kaito Jibako: Uchu Yori Ai no Komete!!)	Japan	Kimio Yabuki; Yoshio Yabuki	Toei Animation; Fuji TV	Traditional	Television special	Twenty third animated special produced for Fuji TV's "Nissei Family Special" program.	September 12, 1983	84 minutes
Dokgotak – Throw It Towards the Sun 독고탁 태양을 향해 던져라 (Dogo Tak taeyang-eul hyanghae deonjyeola)	South Korea	Bak Si-ok	Daewon Donghwa	Traditional	Theatrical			76 minutes
Dot and the Bunny	Australia	Yoram Gross	Yoram Gross Films	Traditional/Live action	Theatrical; Live-action animated film		April 3, 1983	81 minutes
Doraemon: Nobita and the Castle of the Undersea Devil ドラえもん のび太の海底鬼岩城 (Doraemon Nobita no Kaiteiki Ganjō)	Japan	Tsutomu Shibayama	Shin-Ei Animation; Asatsu; Toho	Traditional	Theatrical		March 12, 1983	95 minutes
The Dragon That Wasn't (Or Was He?); Als je begrijpt wat ik bedoel (If You Know What I Mean)	Netherlands	Harrie Geelen; Bjørn Frank Jensen; Bert Kroon	Toonder Studio's	Traditional	Theatrical	First Dutch animated feature.	February 3, 1983	84 minutes
Dr. Slump and Arale-chan: Hoyoyo! The Great Race Around the World; Dr.スランプ アラレちゃん ほよよ世界一周大レース (Dokutā Suranpu Arare-chan: Hoyoyo! Sekai Isshū Dai-Rēsu)	Japan	Minoru Okazaki	Toei Animation	Traditional	Theatrical		March 13, 1983	52 minutes
Elpidio Valdés Against Dollar and Cannon; Elpidio Valdés contra dólar y cañón	Cuba	Juan Padrón		Traditional	Theatrical			75 minutes
Final Yamato 宇宙戦艦ヤマト・完結編 (Uchuu Senkan Yamato: Kanketsu Hen)	Japan	Tomoharu Katsumata; Yoshinobu Nishizaki	Toei Company; Group TAC	Traditional	Theatrical	The film's extended cut, at a running time of 163 minutes, was considered the longest animated feature ever made, until the release of In This Corner (and Other Corners) of the World, released in 2019.	March 19, 1983	152 minutes
Fire and Ice	United States	Ralph Bakshi	Bakshi Productions; Producers Sales Organization; 20th Century-Fox	Traditional	Theatrical		August 26, 1983	81 minutes
Galactic Legend Terra 은하전설 테라 (Eunhajeonseol Tera)	South Korea	Hong Sang-man		Traditional	Theatrical		January 3, 1983	73 minutes
The Golden Arm 황금의 팔 (Hwanggeum-ui pal)	South Korea	Choe Jin-woo	Plus Film Co., Ltd.	Traditional	Theatrical		July 16, 1983	71 minutes
The Golden Pencil and the Mischievous Alien Boy 황금연필과 개구장이 외계소년 (Hwanggeumnyeonpilgwa Gaegujangi Oegyesonyeon)	South Korea	Lee Young-soo		Traditional	Theatrical		August 13, 1983	63 minutes
Golgo 13: The Professional ゴルゴ13 (Gorugo Sātīn)	Japan	Osamu Dezaki	Toho-Towa; Tokyo Movie Shinsha	Traditional	Theatrical	First animated film to incorporate computer animation.	May 28, 1983	93 minutes
Gulliver's Travels; Los Viajes de Gulliver	Spain	Cruz Delgado	Art Animación; Estudios Cruz Delgado	Traditional	Theatrical		December 17, 1983	80 minutes
Harmagedon: Genma Wars 幻魔大戦 ‒ハルマゲドン‒ (Genma Taisen: Harumagedon)	Japan	Rintaro	Madhouse	Traditional	Theatrical		March 12, 1983	131 minutes
I am a Dog: The Life of Don Matsugoro 吾輩は犬である ドン松五郎の生活 (Wagahai wa Inu de Aru: Don Matsugorou no Seikatsu)	Japan	Kimio Yabuki	Toei Animation; Fuji TV	Traditional	Television film	Twenty first animated special produced for Fuji TV's "Nissei Family Special" program.	February 9, 1983	73 minutes
The Iron Triumvirate 철인 삼총사 (Cheol-in samchongsa)	South Korea	Bak Seung-cheol	3rd Advertisement	Traditional	Theatrical		December 17, 1983	65 minutes
It's an Adventure, Charlie Brown	United States	Bill Melendez	United Feature Syndicate	Traditional	Television special Anthology film	Second hour-long Peanuts special.	May 16, 1983	47 minutes
John the Boaster; Háry János	Hungary	Zsolt Richly; Marcell Jankovics	Pannónia Filmstúdió	Traditional; Rotoscope	Theatrical		May 9, 1983	62 minutes
The Knight of the Red Heart; Rycerzyk czerwonego serduszka	Poland	Bogdan Nowicki	Studio Miniatur Filmowych	Traditional		Compilation of the Polish animated series Baśnie i waśnie (lit. "Fairy Tales and Feuds"), which ran in 1964 for 13 consecutive episodes.	August 1983	63 minutes
The Legend of Hiawatha	United States; Canada	Sebastian Grunstra	Atkinson Film-Arts; Triple Seven Concepts	Traditional	Television film	Originally aired as the 57th episode of the NBC anthology series Special Treat on December 4, 1984.	November 24, 1983	
Legend of Sealed Book 天书奇谭 (Tian Shu Qi Tan)	China	Wang Shuchen	Shanghai Animation	Traditional	Theatrical		January 1, 1983	89 minutes
Miraesonyeon Kunta Beomyuda 5000 Nyeon 미래소년 쿤타 버뮤다 5000년 (Future Boy Kunta of Bermuda 5000 Years)	South Korea	Bak Seol-hyeong	Daewon Donghwa	Traditional	Theatrical		January 21, 1983	75 minutes
Nine ナイン (Nain)	Japan	Gisaburō Sugii	Group TAC	Traditional	Television film	Twenty second animated special produced for Fuji TV's "Nissei Family Special" program.	May 4, 1983	
Nine: The Original ナイン オリジナル版 (Nain: Original Han)	Japan	Gisaburō Sugii	Group TAC	Traditional	Theatrical	Theatrical version of the television film.	September 16, 1983	71 minutes
Nine 2: Sweetheart Declaration ナイン２ 恋人宣言 (Nain 2: Koibito Sengen)	Japan	Gisaburō Sugii	Group TAC	Traditional	Television film	Twenty fourth animated special produced for Fuji TV's "Nissei Family Special" program; sequel to Nine (1983).	December 18, 1983	67 minutes
Noel's Fantastic Trip ノエルの不思議な冒険 (Noel no Fushigi na Bouken)	Japan	Tsuneo Maeda	Toei Central Film; Iruka Office	Traditional			April 29, 1983	72 minutes
Old Master Q and San T 山T老夫子	Hong Kong	Toshiyuki Honda; Cai Mingqin	Hong Kong Film Company; Dragon Cartoon Co., Ltd.	Traditional	Theatrical		August 4, 1983	71 minutes
The Princess and the Robot; A Princesa e o Robô	Brazil	Mauricio de Sousa	Embrafilme	Traditional	Theatrical		December 23, 1983 (limited); January 16, 1984 (Brazil)	93 minutes
Patalliro! Stardust Project パタリロ! スターダスト計画	Japan	Nobutaka Nishizawa	Toei Animation	Traditional	Theatrical		July 10, 1983	48 minutes
Protectors of Universe 슈퍼특급 마징가 7 (Syupeoteukgeup Majingga 7)	South Korea	Yi Gyu-hong		Traditional	Theatrical		July 30, 1983	72 minutes
Pro Yakyū o 10-bai Tanoshiku Miru Hōhō プロ野球を10倍楽しく見る方法	Japan	Kiyoshi Suzuki; Tsutomu Shibayama; Osamu Kobayashi	Tokyo Movie Shinsha	Traditional	Theatrical		April 29, 1983	97 minutes
The Raccoons and the Lost Star	Canada	Kevin Gillis	CBC	Traditional	Television special		December 13, 1983	49 minutes
Revenge of the Humanoids; La revanche des humanoides	France	Albert Barillé	Procidis; Eiken	Traditional	Theatrical; Compilation film	Film compiled from TV series episodes	January 26, 1983	100 minutes
Rock & Rule	Canada	Clive A. Smith	Nelvana Limited; CFDC; Famous Players; Canada Trust	Traditional	Theatrical	The very first animated feature to contain computer-generated imagery.	April 15, 1983	77 minutes
Roy of Space; Roy del espacio	Mexico	Héctor López Carmona; Rafael Ángel Gil; Ulises Pérez Aguirre	Aguirre Valdez Productores y Distribuidores de Peliculas S.A.	Traditional; Rotoscope	Theatrical	Lost film.	March 3, 1983	63 minutes
Sherlock Holmes and a Study in Scarlet	Australia		Burbank Films Australia	Traditional	Television film		January 15, 1983	
Sherlock Holmes and the Baskerville Curse	Australia		Burbank Films Australia	Traditional	Television film		January 16, 1983	
Sherlock Holmes and the Sign of Four	Australia		Burbank Films Australia	Traditional	Television film		January 13, 1983	
Sherlock Holmes and the Valley of Fear	Australia		Burbank Films Australia	Traditional	Television film		January 14, 1983	
Space Champion Hong Gil-dong 우주전사 홍길동 (Ujujeonsa hong Gil-dong)	South Korea	Kim Hyeon-dong; Jeong Su-yong	Korean Educational Film Company	Traditional	Theatrical		December 17, 1983	62 minutes
Space Gundam V 스페이스 간담 브이 (Seupeiseu gandam beu-i)	South Korea	Kim Cheong-gi	Seoul Animation Production	Traditional	Theatrical		July 21, 1983	82 minutes
Straszydła; Bogeymen	Poland	Roman Huszczo	Studio Miniatur Filmowych	Traditional	Theatrical			60 minutes
Super Titan 15 슈퍼 타이탄15 (Syupeo Taitan 15	South Korea	Bak Seung-cheol	Korean-Japanese Culture	Traditional	Theatrical		July 17, 1983	68 minutes
A Time Slip of 10000 Years: Prime Rose タイムスリップ10000年 プライム・ローズ (Time Slip Ichimannen Prime Rose)	Japan	Osamu Dezaki; Satoshi Dezaki	Tezuka Productions; Nippon TV	Traditional	Television film	Sixth animated special produced for Nippon TV's 24 Hour TV "Love Saves the Earth" telethon.	August 21, 1983	90 minutes
Twice Upon a Time	United States	John Korty; Charles Swenson	Korty Films; Lucasfilm; The Ladd Company; Warner Bros. Pictures	Stop motion/cutout	Theatrical		August 5, 1983	75 minutes
Undersea Expedition Marine X 해저 탐험대 마린 X (Haejeotamheomdae Marin X)	South Korea	Kim Hyeon-dong	Namyang Planning Co., Ltd.	Traditional	Theatrical		February 19, 1983	69 minutes
Unico in the Island of Magic ユニコ 魔法の島へ (Unico: To the Magic Island)	Japan	Moribi Murano	Sanrio; Madhouse	Traditional	Theatrical	Sequel to The Fantastic Adventures of Unico (1981).	July 16, 1983	90 minutes
Urusei Yatsura: Only You うる星やつら オンリー・ユー (Urusei Yatsura: Onrī Yū)	Japan	Mamoru Oshii	Studio Pierrot	Traditional	Theatrical	First anime feature directed by Mamoru Oshii, and the inaugural feature in the Urusei Yatsura film series.	February 13, 1983	101 minutes
Water Spider-Wonder Spider; Vizipók-Csodapók	Hungary	Szabolcs Szabó; József Haui; Csaba Szombati-Szabó	Pannónia Filmstúdió	Traditional	Theatrical	Winner of the Children's Prize at the 1st Kecskemét Animation Film Festival, and the Jury's Diploma of Merit for backgrounds at the 2nd KAFF.	September 3, 1983	75 minutes
The Wind in the Willows	United Kingdom	Mark Hall; Chris Taylor	Cosgrove Hall Films; ITV (distributor)	Stop-motion	Television film		December 27, 1983	79 minutes
Xabungle Graffiti ザブングルグラフィティ	Japan	Yoshiyuki Tomino	Nippon Sunrise	Traditional	Theatrical; Compilation film	Film compiled from TV series episodes.	July 9, 1983	84 minutes

== Highest-grossing animated films of the year ==
Rank	Title	Studio	Worldwide gross	Ref.
1	Rock & Rule	United Artists; Nelvana Limited; Famous Players	$30,379,000	
2	Harmagedon: Genma Wars	Madhouse; Kadokawa	$4,500,000	
3	Twice Upon a Time	The Ladd Company; Lucasfilm; Korty Films	$3,000,000	
4	Fire and Ice	20th Century Fox; Aspen Productions; Film Finance Group	$1,200,000	

== See also ==
- List of animated television series of 1983
