= List of Stop!! Hibari-kun! episodes =

Stop!! Hibari-kun! is a 35-episode Japanese anime television series based on the manga series of the same name written and illustrated by Hisashi Eguchi. It is directed by Takashi Hisaoka and produced by the animation studio Toei Animation. The screenplay was written by: Shigeru Yanagawa, Tokio Tsuchiya, Hiroshi Toda, Tomomi Tsutsui, Takeshi Shudo and Yumi Asano. The character design used in the anime was provided by Yoshinori Kanemori, and the music was composed by Kōji Nishimura. The series follows Kōsaku Sakamoto, a high school student who goes to live with yakuza boss Ibari Ōzora and his four children—Tsugumi, Tsubame, Hibari and Suzume—after the death of his mother. Kōsaku is shocked to learn that Hibari, who looks and behaves as a girl, was assigned male at birth.

The series aired from May 20, 1983, to January 27, 1984, on Fuji Television. The series was later released by Universal J to two DVD compilation volumes from February to March 2003. A DVD box set was released by TC Entertainment in September 2014. The opening theme is "Stop!! Hibari-kun!" (ストップ!! ひばりくん!) sung by Yuki Yukino and the ending theme is "Kongara Connection" (コンガラ・コネクション) sung by Ai Hoshino.

== Episode list ==
No.	Title	Animation directed by	Written by	Original release date
1	"She!? Is An Idol!"; Transliteration: "Kanojo!? wa Aidoru!" (Japanese: 彼女!?はアイドル!)	Makoto Itō	Shigeru Yanagawa	May 20, 1983
Following his mother's death, high school student Kōsaku Sakamoto travels to Tokyo to live with a friend of his mother's, Ibari Ōzora. When they arrive at the Ōzora household, Kōsaku discovers Ibari is the boss of the Ōzora Group yakuza organization. Kōsaku considers leaving, but has second thoughts when he meets Ibari's four children: Tsugumi, Tsubame, Hibari and Suzume. Although he initially believes Ibari to have four daughters, Kōsaku is shocked to learn that Hibari, who looks and behaves as a girl, was assigned male at birth. The next day, Kōsaku enrolls into the same school as Hibari and Tsubame, and Kōsaku learns that everyone at school believes Hibari is a girl. Kōsaku is in the same class as Hibari, and one of their classmates named Makoto Shiina takes an instant dislike to Kōsaku for his perceived closeness to Hibari. Shiina provokes Kōsaku and punches him only for Shiina to get punched himself by Hibari moments later.
2	"Special Training! Tatsu the Spartan"; Transliteration: "Tokkun! Suparuta no Tatsu" (Japanese: 特訓!スパルタの辰)	Yoshinori Kanemori	Yumi Asano	May 27, 1983
After having a nightmare where Hibari kissed him, Kōsaku is woken up by Seiji, an intimidating underling of the Ōzora Group. Hibari walks into Kōsaku's room and climbs into his bed. Ibari walks in and sees what he thinks is the two sleeping together, causing him to have a heart attack. Ibari decides to use a "Spartan method" to make Hibari more manly. The trainer, "Tatsu the Spartan", arrives at the Ōzora household. Despite his intimidating appearance Hibari makes fun of his spaced-out face, comparing it to a flatfish. The next day, Hibari and Kōsaku walk to school together, much to the dismay of Shiina, while Tatsu stalks them. At school, Hibari is shown to be both intelligent and athletic. Tatsu reports his findings to Ibari, stating that Hibari has what it takes to be a man, but being a "pervert" holds him back. Tatsu brings Hibari into the family dojo for more aggressive training during which he cuts part of Hibari's hair with scissors. Now angry, Hibari defeats Tatsu, destroying the dojo. Tatsu believes if Hibari were to ever act like a man she would be an incredible yakuza. Kōsaku reflects on the day's events, feeling relieved that Hibari did not change, but refuses to admit he feels that way about her.
3	"It's Out!? Someone Saw!?"; Transliteration: "Bareta!? Mirareta!?" (Japanese: ばれた!?みられた!?)	Kazuo Tomizawa	Tokio Tsuchiya	June 3, 1983
Hibari dresses in punk clothing to sing for a friends rock band during their school's foundation day. Ibari freaks out when Hibari asks to be treated as his daughter and has another heart attack. During the festival, Hibari sings the ending theme "Kongara Connection". The male students are enthralled by Hibari, who wins first place in the "Miss Wakaba" contest. A few of the girls, led by freshman Kaori Hanazono, are jealous of Hibari. At home, Kōsaku and Tsubame agree that if anyone found out Hibari's "true identity" it would cause problems. The next day, in the women's locker room, Kaori notices that Hibari is unusually "flat-chested", and later overhears Kōsaku call Hibari a "pervert", leading her to infer Hibari is male. Kaori hires delinquents to strip Hibari naked but Hibari fends them off. During class, the teacher announces the upcoming health check-ups which Kaori plans to take advantage of to see if Hibari is male. Hibari plans to stay home on the day of the check-ups to avoid being discovered. However, Kaori and her friends visit the Ōzora household before school, prompting Kōsaku to try and prevent them from coming in. "Hibari" then appears and goes to school normally. At school "Hibari" is pressured by Kaori and her friends to strip in front of them. She willingly does so, revealing actual breasts. Back at home, it is revealed that Tsubame dressed up as Hibari and went to school in her place.
4	"Ringside Love"; Transliteration: "Ringusaido no Koi" (Japanese: リングサイドの恋)	Kiyoshi Matsumoto	Hiroshi Toda	June 10, 1983
Kōsaku has a nightmare of himself as an ant being targeted by a "horned" Hibari. As Hibari is getting dressed, Ibari barges into her room to confiscate her female clothing. Kōsaku, hearing screams, walks in to see Hibari half naked and has a heart attack of his own. Tsugumi believes Hibari being around Kōsaku has made her even more feminine. Sabu, another Ōzora Group henchman, tells Kōsaku that Hibari may be in love with him and that Kōsaku may also love Hibari, much to his dismay. Kōsaku plans to become manlier to repel Hibari's "perversions" and visits the school's boxing club. He meets the club's captain, the perverted Mitsuo Kaji. Shiina, also in the club, takes the opportunity to knock Kōsaku unconscious in the ring. Hibari defends Kōsaku by knocking Shiina unconscious. Kōsaku becomes a club member with Hibari tagging along. The club's manager, Rie Kawai, returns after being absent for a week. Kōsaku falls in love with her, prompting Hibari to become jealous. Kōsaku becomes accustomed to boxing and notices that, as he spars with Shiina, Rie appears to be staring lovingly at "him". Later that night, at Rie's home, she admits she cannot stop thinking about "him". The boxing club decides to hold a training camp at a nearby beach during the holidays. Kōsaku is excited that Rie will be there. Kaji also announces that Hibari has joined as "co-manager", and will be attending the camp. Hibari learns from Rie that she is in love with Shiina, creating a "love square" between Kōsaku, Rie, Shiina, and Hibari.
5	"A Broken Heart Tastes Like Natsumikan?"; Transliteration: "Shitsuren wa Natsumikan no Aji?" (Japanese: 失恋は夏ミカンの味?)	Nobumichi Kawamura	Shigeru Yanagawa	June 17, 1983
The boxing club depart for their training camp. As they enter a tunnel, an earthquake traps the train. With the lights out, Hibari prompts Rie to tell Shiina she loves him while Shiina plans to kiss Hibari. Shiina and Rie switch seats, so Shiina sits next to Hibari while Rie ends up next to Kōsaku. Shiina tries to kiss Hibari but gets beaten up, while Rie mistakenly confesses her love to Kōsaku. Seiji arrives, admitting that Ibari told him to make sure Hibari and Kōsaku do not do anything while alone together. Seiji drives the club to the camp at Umineko Inn, with the boys in one room while Hibari and Rie share another. At supper, a drunk Kōsaku announces Rie confessed her love to him. He also almost reveals Hibari's birth gender but is stopped by her before he can. Rie asks Hibari to come with her to the baths as she is scared to go alone. Hibari agrees as Rie is not wearing her contact lenses and cannot see Hibari's body. The boys attempt to peep on them while Kōsaku freaks out over Hibari being that close to "his Rie", prompting Hibari to emerge in only a bath towel. Rie tells Kōsaku that he grosses her out and explains she meant to confess to Shiina. At night Hibari prompts Rie to try and sleep with Shiina, while Shiina attempts to sleep with Hibari. Kōsaku tells Shiina that Rie is in love with him, but Shiina says he only wants Hibari. Rie, who overhears this, is heartbroken. Kōsaku accidentally falls on top of Hibari, causing a misunderstanding. As everyone returns home Kōsaku laments what happened at the retreat, stating that Rie has not been to the boxing club since.
6	"Ahh!! Romeo and Juliet"; Transliteration: "Aa!! Romio to Jurietto" (Japanese: ああ!!ロミオとジュリエット)	Yoshitaka Yashima	Tomomi Tsutsui	June 24, 1983
Tsugumi has recently fallen in love. Unfortunately Ibari does not approve as her boyfriend, Bunta, is from the Umiushi family, the Ōzora family's traditional enemies. Hibari silences Ibari by suggesting he wear panties, causing another heart attack. Bunta sneaks into Tsugumi's room to ask her to elope with him but they are caught by Ibari wielding a shotgun. Bunta flees while Hibari defeats Ibari in a shootout. Bunta's father invades the Ōzora house and brawls with Ibari, until Tsugumi calms him down. He claims he respects Tsugumi but refuses to allow the marriage as she is still an Ōzora. Hibari suggests Tsugumi and Bunta pretend to commit suicide, Romeo and Juliet style, to change their parent's minds, but they decide to elope instead. Days later Bunta dumps Tsugumi and marries a rich businessman's daughter instead. Tsugumi slaps Hibari for scaring Bunta with her suicide plan. Hibari attends Bunta's wedding and punches him in the face for upsetting Tsugumi. Tsugumi apologises for slapping Hibari while Hibari assures her a decent man is closer than she suspects, suggesting she knows Sabu is in love with Tsugumi. Kōsaku admits he likes Hibari a little more but regrets saying it once Hibari tries to kiss him.
7	"Blow, Wind! Kotatsu's Counterattack!!"; Transliteration: "Fuke yo Kaze! Kotatsu no Gyakushū!!" (Japanese: 吹けよ風!小辰の逆襲!!)	Takao Kōzai	Yumi Asano	July 1, 1983
A young man tries to flirt with Hibari, annoying her. As she leaves with Kōsaku the man begins searching for the Ōzora house. Hibari tries to show Kōsaku her new panties, infuriating Ibari who believes men should wear loincloths, leading to another heart attack. The young man arrives and introduces himself as Sparta Kotatsu, son of Tatsu the Spartan who went mad after losing against Hibari and became a cross dresser. Kotatsu desires revenge and attacks Kōsaku, thinking he is Hibari. However when he learns that Hibari is Hibari he passes out from shock. As Kotatsu is quite perverted Ibari shoots at him with a machine gun, doubting he is the son of the highly disciplined Tatsu, until Hibari removes Kotatsu's sunglasses revealing he inherited Tatsu's flatfish face. Kotatsu accidentally insults the Ōzora sisters so Tsubame borrows Ibari's gun to also shoot at him. Hibari refuses to fight with Kotatsu, so he kidnaps Kōsaku to force Hibari to fight. Hibari attends the fight in a leotard, overwhelming Kotatsu with cuteness. He confesses his love for her before being defeated. Hibari rescues Kōsaku and after the fight asks Kōsaku to protect her as she embraces him.
8	"Substitute Date Plan"; Transliteration: "Migawari Dēto Sakusen" (Japanese: 身代わりデート作戦)	Takao Kōzai	Hiroshi Toda	July 8, 1983
Hibari has a lewd dream about Kōsaku and decides she is going to steal a kiss from him. Kaji is jealous that Kōsaku lives with Tsubame and sneaks into the Ōzora house but is caught by Ibari. Kaji invites Tsubame on a date then leaves before she can say no. Tsubame asks Hibari to pretend to be her on the date and reject Kaji for her. Kōsaku and Tsubame monitor the date and hear Hibari inviting Kaji to a Love Hotel. Kōsaku rushes to stop them in a jealous rage, though Hibari had known Kōsaku was listening. After Kōsaku is beaten up by the love hotel's security guards he and Tsubame return home. Kaji, now thoroughly drunk, insists on seeing Tsubame's room and almost sees Tsubame naked, forcing her to hide. To make Kaji leave Hibari kisses Kōsaku, while still disguised as Tsubame, to make Kaji think Tsubame is dating Kōsaku. Kaji jumps out the window but sees the real Tsubame on his way down. He then wanders into town where he hallucinates every woman he sees is Tsubame. Tsubame shouts at Hibari for using such a dirty trick while Kōsaku is devastated his first kiss was with a boy.
9	"Suzume's Boyfriend"; Transliteration: "Suzume no Bōifurendo" (Japanese: すずめのボーイフレンド)	Yasuomi Umetsu	Shigeru Yanagawa	July 15, 1983
Suzume invites her friends over for a study session, one of whom she has a crush on. Hibari suggests Suzume seduce him with a revealing outfit, earning a scolding from Kōsaku about the evils of corrupting children. Hibari attempts to kiss Kōsaku, giving Ibari another heart attack. Suzume's friends are initially too scared to enter after seeing Ibari attempting to remove Hibari's female clothing. Katagiri, Suzume's crush, instantly falls in love with Hibari. Ibari puts on a play but the yakuza actors use real weapons so Suzume scolds Ibari, giving him yet another heart attack. Suzume realises Katagiri is in love with Hibari and becomes upset at her. When Katagiri sees Hibari hugging Kōsaku he poses as an assassin to interrogate Kōsaku about Hibari's love life, but is quickly exposed by Hibari. Now knowing why Suzume was mad at her Hibari manages to convince Suzume that Katagiri invited her on a date to the zoo. However at the zoo Katagiri reveals he only agreed to go on a date with Suzume because Hibari promised to go on a date with him afterwards. Hearing this Suzume slaps Katagiri, dumps him and makes up with Hibari.
10	"The ABCs of Love Lessons"; Transliteration: "Ai no Ressun ABC" (Japanese: 愛のレッスンA・B・C)	Kiyoshi Matsumoto	Takeshi Shudo	July 22, 1983
Kōsaku wakes up from a dream of being unable to escape Hibari ending up as his girlfriend. He finds a postcard from his best friend and eternal rival, Daisuke Itagaki, who is arriving later that day for a visit. Kōsaku explains to Tsubame that their longest running competition was to see who would get a girlfriend first, with the loser having to shave their "entire bodies". Hibari offers to help Kōsaku win by pretending to be his girlfriend, and Kōsaku reluctantly agrees. When Itagaki first meets Hibari he refuses to believe she is Kōsaku's real girlfriend and demands they prove they are dating by kissing. Kōsaku tells Hibari to pretend to kiss, though this upsets Hibari as she wants him to really kiss her. They are interrupted by two thugs who try to steal Hibari. Kōsaku tries to defend her but is injured, so Hibari beats up the thugs instead. Itagaki is finally convinced they are a real couple, even though Kōsaku admits Hibari is not his girlfriend. Itagaki nonetheless hopes they will be a couple in the future and returns home. Kōsaku realises he is growing used to being close to Hibari and tries to run away while she chases after him.
11	"Panic on the Shore!"; Transliteration: "Umibe no Panikku!" (Japanese: 海辺のパニック!)	Nobumichi Kawamura	Tokio Tsuchiya	July 29, 1983
Kōsaku and Hibari's class are going to the beach. Hibari goes bikini shopping but Kaori arrives and steals a swimsuit Hibari wanted. As revenge Hibari collapses the changing room walls, exposing Kaori's breasts in public. Hibari decides to borrow Tsubame's bikini, only when Tsubame steals it back, leaving Hibari half-naked, Ibari is parentally outraged but has another heart attack when he realises he treated Hibari like a real girl. Kaori plans to get revenge by stripping Hibari naked at the beach. As Hibari goes swimming Kaori's delinquents dress as a shark to steal her bikini but are scared off by a real shark, though not before shooting it with a harpoon. Kōsaku and Seiji rush to save Hibari but she cannot leave the water as her bikini has fallen off. Seiji throws her his loincloth to cover her chest while the shark attacks Kaori. Hibari, now clothed and able to fight back, beats up the shark, saving Kaori and her gang. Seiji does a naked victory dance, traumatising Kaori and her gang. Later it is revealed the real shark was actually Ibari in a costume helping keep Hibari safe and the harpoon is now stuck in one of his buttocks.
12	"Youth Is a Test of Courage!"; Transliteration: "Seishun wa Kimodameshi!" (Japanese: 青春はきもだめし!)	Kenji Yokoyama	Yumi Asano	August 5, 1983
Ibari refuses to allow Kōsaku and Hibari to go to summer camp in case something happens while they are alone together. Sabu points out refusing to allow them to go would damage Ibari's yakuza honour so Ibari gives them permission but has a heart attack anyway. At the camp Shiina plans to seduce Hibari while Kaori plans to get Hibari by separating her from Kōsaku. Hibari has her cooking sabotaged in the kitchen but makes Kaori think twice about trying again after showing off her skills with a knife. Overnight Hibari tells a story about a ghost haunting the camp toilet that terrifies the girls. Kaori suggests they have a test of courage and invites the boys to participate, though she rigs the partner selections to make sure Hibari is separated from Kōsaku. During the test Kaori and her gang manage to tie up and kidnap Hibari and carry her to the haunted toilet. Before they can get any sort of revenge on Hibari they are terrified by a ghost and run away. Hibari escapes and reunites with Kōsaku. The ghost was really Kaji and his siblings who tried to sneak into the camp and got covered in poison ivy.
13	"Hibari Goes for Broke!!"; Transliteration: "Hibari Ōshōbu Hairimasu!!" (Japanese: ひばり大勝負入ります!!)	Takao Kōzai	Hiroshi Toda	August 12, 1983
Ibari is hosting the annual gambling tournament for every yakuza boss in Japan. Seiji is initially chosen as Game Master but Hibari, who wants to be included, hog ties Seiji and takes his place wearing a traditional yukata, causing Ibari to have another heart attack. Yakkun, the idiot son of the boss of the Crazy Group, falls in love with Hibari and tries to strip her clothes off, so she beats him up. Yakkun insists on marrying Hibari so his father demands a marriage meeting. Hibari is forced onto a date with Yakkun and is completely repulsed by him, beating him up again when he tries to touch her. This only makes Yakkun love Hibari more so Boss Crazy demands that Hibari marry Yakkun or he will destroy the Ōzora family. Kōsaku helps Hibari by claiming he is already her fiancé, with Hibari taking the opportunity to kiss him again. As revenge Boss Crazy has his men beat up Kōsaku. Enraged Hibari shoots her way into Crazy headquarters and terrifies Boss Crazy into agreeing to stay away from Kōsaku. Afterwards it is revealed Boss Crazy is actually a masochist who enjoyed being punished by Hibari and is now in love with her.
14	"Exciting Love Triangle"; Transliteration: "Doki! Doki! Sankaku Kankei" (Japanese: ドキ!ドキ!三角関係)	Yoshinori Kanemori	Shigeru Yanagawa	August 19, 1983
Kōsaku has been having erotic dreams about Hibari and the lack of sleep is affecting his health. Ibari warns Hibari to leave Kōsaku alone only to have another heart attack after Hibari accuses him of jealousy. Tsubame suggests Kōsaku move out of the Ōzora house temporarily. Kaji offers to let Kōsaku move in with him, however Kōsaku still cannot sleep due to Kaji's snoring. Honda, a popular boy and known womaniser, is shocked when Hibari shows no interest in him. Honda informs Kōsaku he intends to make Hibari his 1000th conquest. He attempts to flirt with Hibari but she is uninterested. Hibari is upset when Kōsaku claims he does not care if she dates Honda. Kōsaku has a dream of Hibari falling in love with Honda and becomes worried about her. Two of Honda's womaniser friends lure Hibari away but when Kōsaku learns this he and Shiina rush to save Hibari. Honda attempts to seduce Hibari but she rejects him just as Kōsaku and Shiina arrive and beat up the three womanisers. Kōsaku decides to return to the Ōzora house, making Hibari happy again. Kōsaku realises he has been acting as if he and Hibari are a real couple and suspects Hibari manipulated him into moving back home.
15	"Seiji-san's Intense Day"; Transliteration: "Seiji-san no Atsui Ichinichi" (Japanese: 政二さんの熱い一日)	Yasuomi Umetsu	Tokio Tsuchiya	August 26, 1983
Seiji receives his very first love letter but is worried his job as a yakuza would make him an unsuitable husband. Seiji leaves to meet the girl who turns out to be Hanako, Kaori's friend who developed a crush on Seiji after seeing his naked victory dance at the beach. Hibari catches Kōsaku spying on them and drags him away for a date. Seiji later tells Kōsaku he turned Hanako down because Ibari took him in as a child and if he got married he would have to leave the yakuza. Kaori convinces Hanako that Seiji dumped her because of Hibari. Hanako sneaks into the Ōzora house to beat up Hibari but accidentally attacks Ibari so Seiji beats her up, only realising it is her when he takes her mask off. He explains that he does not love Hibari, but his loyalty to Ibari means they cannot be together. He gives her a necklace as a memento of their love. Suzume reveals she called the police to report Hanako as a burglar, panicking all the criminal yakuza in the house; however the police arrest Kaori and her other friends while Seiji manages to sneak Hanako out safely.
16	"Tsugumi's Second Love!"; Transliteration: "Tsugumi no Sekando Rabu!" (Japanese: つぐみのセカンドラブ!)	Takao Kōzai	Hiroshi Toda	September 2, 1983
Tsugumi leaves to go on a secret date. Ibari angrily tries to stop her but has another heart attack. Hibari and Kōsaku follow Tsugumi to a film set where she meets her new boyfriend, Takakura Yujiro, a young actor hoping to become a movie star. Ibari refuses to let Tsugumi marry a movie star as he believes they are all useless show offs. Yujiro manages to become the lead actor in a movie after accidentally impressing the famous director. He asks Ibari for Tsugumi's hand in marriage but Ibari throws him out. Yujiro finds out his movie contract says he is not allowed to get married as long as he is a movie star. Kōsaku and Hibari learn that Yujiro signed the contract and dumped Tsugumi. Sabu, who loves Tsugumi, decides to get revenge and invades Yujiro's movie set to try and kill him. In the end Hibari slaps Yujiro unconscious and the movie director loves the action so much he tries to make Hibari the star of his next film. Sabu tries to console Tsugumi while Hibari, tired of waiting for Tsugumi to realise Sabu loves her, scares her with a fake spider, causing her to jump into Sabu's arms.
17	"Dad's (Hidden) Romance Album!"; Transliteration: "(Hiso) Tō-san no Roman Arubamu!" (Japanese: (秘)父さんのロマンアルバム!)	Makoto Itō	Tomomi Tsutsui	September 9, 1983
An earthquake during the memorial for Hibari's deceased mother unearths an old album containing pictures of Kōsaku's mother. Ibari reveals Kōsaku's mother, Harue, was his girlfriend, but she left him to marry Kōsaku's father. Ibari later married the daughter of the previous Ōzora boss, Hibari's mother. Hibari becomes upset that Ibari has a whole album of Harue but only one picture of her mother and runs away. A politician asks Ibari for his help demolishing a children's park in order to build an entertainment centre. Ibari refuses as many of his children's precious memories are linked to the park. Kōsaku asks the initially reluctant Hibari to help Ibari and they sneak into the meeting. Ibari reveals his wife named all four of their children, Tsugumi, Tsubame, Hibari, and Suzume after birds found in the park and refuses to let it be demolished. Ibari almost burns the album but Hibari stops him. Ibari explained Hibari's mother gave him the album so he would always remember his youthful memories, even his memories of another woman. Hibari decides to start an album with pictures of Kōsaku, which almost gives Ibari a heart attack, but not quite. Kōsaku mourns his mother in private.
18	"Flirt! Lovey-dovey Love"; Transliteration: "Ichatsuite! Raburaburabu" (Japanese: いちゃついて!ラブラブラブ)	Nobumichi Kawamura	Shigeru Yanagawa	September 16, 1983
Ever since he failed to seduce Hibari Honda has become afraid of girls. After he sees Hibari flirting with Kōsaku he decides to try seduce Hibari again by manipulating Shiina into beating up Kōsaku. Honda takes a picture of Kōsaku and Hibari together and use it to spread a rumour they were making out. Hibari is unconcerned since she admits she loves Kōsaku and most of the other students assume they are a couple anyway. The photograph makes Shiina jealous, which is made worse when Honda's friends manipulate Kōsaku and Hibari into admitting they are dating. Honda and his friends try and sneak into the Ōzora house to peek in Hibari's window but are caught by the machine gun security system and Seiji. Honda shows Shiina a picture of Kōsaku and Hibari naked together so Shiina decides to beat up Kōsaku. However one of Honda's friends, angry at Honda almost getting him killed by Seiji, admits to Shiina the photograph is a fake. Hibari slaps Honda for causing trouble again while Shiina is happy Kōsaku and Hibari are not actually dating. Kōsaku panics when he realises he would actually want to kiss Hibari if she were a real girl.
19	"Look for the Mafia's Bride"; Transliteration: "Sagase! Mafia no Hanayome" (Japanese: 探せ!マフィアの花嫁)	Takashi Saijō	Hiroshi Toda	September 23, 1983
Kōsaku has a dream of being married to Hibari and having children. Don Corleone, a Mafia Don and old friend of Ibari's, visits the Ōzora house. Ibari forces his daughters to wear traditional kimono then has a heart attack when Hibari also wears one. Corleone wants his son Michael to marry one of Ibari's daughters and threatens to have Ibari assassinated if he refuses. Michael decides he wants to marry Hibari which gives Ibari another heart attack. Hibari and Kōsaku run away to avoid the wedding but are followed by Corleone's soldiers and end up cornered. Out of desperation Kōsaku claims Hibari is pregnant with his baby, angering Corleone who prepares to shoot him. Ibari suddenly arrives with his daughters and yakuza soldiers to battle Corleone and the mafia and save Hibari. However, the battle is interrupted by a terrible tsunami that heralds the arrival of Corleone's terrifying giant wife, the Godmamma. Corleone only came to Japan because his wife found out he was having an affair. As she drags Corleone and Michael back to America Corleone admits Kōsaku and Hibari make a good couple and asks if he can attend their wedding, terrifying Kōsaku and infuriating Ibari.
20	"How Do You Do!? House Call"; Transliteration: "Ohikaenasutte! Katei Hōmon" (Japanese: おひかえなすって!家庭訪問)	Yoshinori Kanemori	Tokio Tsuchiya	October 7, 1983
Amachi, the PE coach is in love with homeroom teacher Iwasaki. Iwasaki announces she will be doing home visits, starting with the Ōzora house. Ibari decides to turn the house from a Yakuza stronghold into a respectable family home. Hibari is not worried as Iwasaki loves the Yakuza and dumped Amachi because he was wimpy and indecisive. Iwasaki arrives in full Yakuza cosplay, pretending to be a Yakuza underboss as part of her fantasy. She also hopes to meet a strong and assertive Yakuza man to fall in love with. Her role playing is so good she even terrifies Ibari when she expresses her disappointment at the family friendly atmosphere. Suddenly Yakkun, Boss Crazy's idiot son, attacks the Ōzora house with a tank. The threat of actual violence snaps the terrified Iwasaki out of her fantasy and she hides while the Ōzora's battle the Crazy's. Yakkun decides he wants Iwasaki as his girlfriend but she is saved by Amachi, who was secretly a Yakuza soldier the whole time, and they start dating again. Yakkun reveals his attack was planned by Hibari to get Amachi back together with Iwasaki, in return for a kiss. Yakkun then kisses Kōsaku by mistake while chasing Hibari.
21	"Women's Wrestling! Rie vs. Hibari"; Transliteration: "Joshi Purpresu! Rie VS Hibari" (Japanese: 女子プロレス!理絵VSひばり)	Keiko Imazawa	Shigeru Yanagawa	October 14, 1983
Ibari takes Kōsaku to the Women's Wrestling Tournament. Ibari sees two men trying to take naked photographs of the wrestlers and almost joins in but they are caught by Chinma, the Wrestling Group President. The men are beaten up by Hibari. Chinma asks Hibari to audition to be a wrestler. Kōsaku realises one of the wrestlers is Rie, former manager of his boxing club. Ibari has another heart attack when Kōsaku accidentally touches the breasts of Ibari's favourite wrestler. Kōsaku tries to talk to Rie but she runs away. Rie tries to talk to Shiina but he ignores her, so Kōsaku offers to help Rie train. Hibari decides to audition as well. Hibari outperforms Rie at every exercise before they are paired up to wrestle each other. Rie refuses to lose to Hibari and eventually wins the match. Shiina congratulates her but reveals he only came to watch Hibari. Despite this Rie feels happier and quits wrestling. Hibari reveals to Kōsaku she lost on purpose to help Rie get back together with Shiina. However Shiina reveals he still prefers Hibari and asks her on a date. Hibari throws Shiina through a window then asks Kōsaku for a kiss as her prize.
22	"Lovely! School Takarazuka"; Transliteration: "Uruwashi! Gakuen Takarazuka" (Japanese: うるわし!学園タカラヅカ)	Takashi Saijō	Hiroshi Toda	October 21, 1983
All the girls at school have a crush on popular girl Otori Jun, the Volleyball Captain. Hibari tries to entice Kōsaku in her bra and panties, giving Ibari another heart attack. During volleyball practice the ball is knocked to Hibari so she returns it with a serve powerful enough to break the floor. Otori asks Hibari to join the team but Hibari refuses. Otori develops a crush on Hibari whilst dealing with her perverted brothers and eccentric mother. Otori's brothers come to check on her at school, embarrassing her in front of Hibari and the volleyball team, so she stops attending school which puts their upcoming match against a rival school at risk. Hibari tries to convince her to come back but Otori is too embarrassed by her perverted family. Hibari calls her a coward and decides to take her place. Hibari does well in the match, despite her own perverted embarrassing family cheering for her, causing Otori to realise her own family is not so bad after all. She joins the match for the last few minutes and they win the trophy. Her teammates forgive her while Otori's mother tries to get closer to Ibari.
23	"Opening Today! The Story of Detective Kurikara"; Transliteration: "Honjitsu Kaiten! Kurikara Tantei Monogatari" (Japanese: 本日開店!くりから探偵物語)	Makoto Itō	Shigeru Yanagawa	October 28, 1983
The Ōzora family is having money troubles and many of their soldiers are quitting to find real jobs. Ibari refuses to change how he does business but is shamed when he finds a piece of Suzume's homework proving she would prefer Ibari be an honest businessman. Ibari decides to restructure the Ōzora into a company. Hibari hires Computer Ittosai, a hermit computer genius who turns the Ōzora Group into the Kurikara Detective Agency, however Suzume is still not impressed as they do not solve any "cool" cases, plus the soldiers still behave like violent yakuza and upset all their clients. A street thug starts challenging people to games of Rock–paper–scissors, stealing their money if he wins and beating them up if he loses. A drunken Ibari fights him to a draw and decides to catch him to make the company famous. He reveals in his youth he studied rock paper scissors as a martial art and the thug is his former master. He confronts his master but the police arrive and arrest him before they can duel, Suzume having called the police to save Ibari. Suzume then defeats Ibari in a duel and demands to be made Chief Detective so she can keep him safe.
24	"Frightening!! The Strange Event on the Southern Island"; Transliteration: "Osoroshika!! Minami no Shima no Kaiki Jiken" (Japanese: 恐ろしか!!南の島の怪奇事件)	Nobumichi Kawamura	Hiroshi Toda	November 4, 1983
The Kurikara Detective Agency is asked to come to Monkey Island to solve a terrifying mystery. On the plane journey a passenger is murdered. Kuroda and Aota, two police detectives, try to keep the Ōzora's from interfering, but Hibari manages to flirtatiously convince Kuroda to let them help. Another criminal tries to hijack the plane but is comically ignored as the Detectives and Ōzora's argue. Suzume discovers the victim is alive and had been playing a practical joke. After parachuting to Monkey Island Suzume spots a suspicious man in a mask. The mayor, whose daughter Yukiyo is identical to Rie, explains that his other daughters, Hanayo and Hoshiyo, both disappeared and he is afraid Yukiyo is next. He believes the kidnapper is a Demon Monkey from local legend. That night they catch the masked man but it turns out to be Kaji stalking Tsubame. Yukiyo disappears as an earthquake destroys the island, freeing the Demon Monkey who returns the three girls to their father, then fights and defeats three nearby islands, the Demon Crab, the Demon Bee and the Demon Pepper Grinder before disappearing. With the case solved the Ōzora's sail back to Japan on a wooden raft.
25	"Love Under the Shade of a Palm Tree!!"; Transliteration: "Yashi no Kokage de Koi Jara Hoi!!" (Japanese: ヤシの木陰で恋じゃらホイ!!)	Yoshinori Kanemori	Hiroshi Toda	November 11, 1983
Kōsaku and the Ōzora's end up stranded on a desert island. Hibari shares her fantasy about repopulating the world with her and Kōsaku's children. Ibari gets angry and calls Hibari a boy, even though Kaji is nearby. They are joined on the island by Kawahana Hiroshi, who makes adventure television programmes, but he mistakes the Ōzora's for cavemen and runs away, only to be thrown into the river by the real island natives. Ibari has a heart attack when he realises the natives can speak Japanese. The chief's daughter, Ribahi, is identical to Hibari and Kōsaku develops a crush on her. Ibari worries about Tsubame and Tsugimi and decides they must return to Japan. The chief gives them his airplane but then announces Kōsaku is marrying Ribahi. Ibari violently objects as he promised Kōsaku's mother he would look after him. Kōsaku almost kisses Ribahi until Hibari drops coconuts on his head. Kaji peeks on Ribahi in the bath and discovers she is also a cross dressing boy. The chief apologises for the deception but assures Ibari having a cross dressing son makes life more fun, though Ibari refuses to admit it. With the engagement cancelled they set off back to Japan.
26	"Festivals Are Scary! Baseball Is Also Scary!!"; Transliteration: "Omatsuri Kowai! Yakyū mo Kowai!!" (Japanese: お祭りこわい!野球もこわい!!)	Takashi Saijō	Tokio Tsuchiya	November 18, 1983
Kōsaku learns Suzume is frightened of festivals, and the upcoming Kotobuki Shrine Festival makes Ibari so angry he has another heart attack. Hibari explains that the border between the Ōzora's and the Umiushi's territories passes through Kotobuki Shrine and every year they fight over who owns the festival. Ibari and the Umiushi boss are summoned by the Zenigame Groups boss who orders them to settle the matter with a baseball game. It soon becomes clear the Ōzora soldiers are useless at baseball while the Umiushi's hire Geronimo, a Native Indian major league baseball player. Tsugumi decides to play to get revenge against Umiushi's son, Bunta, for dumping her, so Kōsaku, Hibari and Tsubame decide to play as well. During the game the players employ typical yakuza violence and rampant cheating. Seiji gets in a fight with Geronimo and Sabu is injured, meaning he cannot pitch so Hibari pitches instead. She throws the ball so hard she breaks Geronimo's bat. Zenigame, who has a crush on Hibari, decides to personally take over the festival so the Ōzora's and Umiushi's have no reason to fight. Ibari fears that if Zenigame learns Hibari was assigned male at birth, he will have Ibari assassinated, causing another heart attack.
27	"Ibari's Pure Love Curve!?"; Transliteration: "Ibari no Jun'ai Ikkyokusen!?" (Japanese: いばりの純愛一曲線!?)	Keiko Imazawa	Shigeru Yanagawa	November 25, 1983
Ibari has developed a crush on Fumiko, a coffee shop manager. Ibari takes Suzume to a movie where they see Fumiko. Kaji touches Fumiko's leg and she beats him up, revealing she is as violent as a yakuza wife. Ibari falls in love with her. Ibari saves the coffee shop from being shut down by Coffee Ittosai by threatening to assassinate him. Fumiko starts visiting the Ōzora house and immediately suspects something about Hibari. Ibari almost admits he is Yakuza but stops himself. He learns Fumiko has been spoiling Suzume and his other daughters are concerned. Furious at the insult Ibari takes Suzume to see Fumiko. Suzume starts acting spoiled so Ibari slaps her. Fumiko angrily decides to take Suzume to her home but the Ōzora's arrive and Suzume and Ibari reconcile. Hibari asks Fumiko if she wants to marry Ibari but Fumiko secretly admits she underwent gender confirmation surgery, so she could not marry Ibari. After Fumiko closes her coffee shop Hibari decides to keep Fumiko's secret then offers to marry Ibari to shock him out of his depression. This gives Ibari another heart attack but leaves him much happier with his memories of Fumiko.
28	"The Bad Kid Gang Is Here!"; Transliteration: "Warui Ko-dan ga Yattekita!" (Japanese: 悪い子団がやってきた!)	Jūji Mizumura	Hiroshi Toda	December 2, 1983
While Suzume is on a date with Katagiri the park is invaded by child delinquents called the Kid Gangsters. Suzume stands up to them and one of them, Morita Kensaku, develops a crush on her. Ibari is furious but decides not to resort to violence against children. Morita's boss, Shadow Boss, learns Morita has a crush on Suzume and orders him to beat her up. When Morita refuses the other delinquents scare Suzume until she cries. Suzume decides to form a Good Kids Gang to defeat the Kid Gangsters. The thought of Suzume using violence gives Ibari a heart attack. Morita changes sides and joins Suzume's gang, but when he reveals the Kid Delinquents are attacking soon most of Suzume's gang quit, leaving only Suzume, Katagiri and Morita. Ibari forbids adults from participating in children's fights so instead Suzume has Hibari, Kōsaku, Seiji and Sabu scare the Kid Delinquents with Halloween costumes while Suzume beats up Shadow Boss. Ibari thinks Suzume might become a Yakuza Boss one day. This makes Hibari happy because if Suzume inherits the Ōzora Group instead of Hibari then Hibari can marry Kōsaku. She then chases after Kōsaku when he tries to escape.
29	"Exactly Like Hiroko! The Love Bomb Girl"; Transliteration: "Hiroko Sokkuri! Koi no Bakudan Musume!!" (Japanese: ひろ子そっくり!恋の爆弾娘!!)	Takashi Saijō	Hiroshi Toda	December 9, 1983
Kōsaku saves a girl from delinquent members of Kokuryu High Schools boxing club, so they decide to beat up Kōsaku, until Hibari beats them up instead. The girl, Koenji Sayuri, develops a crush on Kōsaku. A strange man harasses Tsubame and Suzume then breaks into the Ōzora house and peeks on Hibari in the bath. This gives Ibari another heart attack. The man turns out to be Shirachi Kogoro, a private detective hired by Sayuri to investigate Kōsaku and his relationship with Hibari. He discovers that Hibari was assigned male at birth. Sayuri swears to defeat Hibari and take Kōsaku, revealing her darker, evil side. She pretends to be ill so Kōsaku invites her into the house. Shiina warns Hibari Sayuri falls in love with every man she meets and can be dangerous. Sayuri tries to seduce Kōsaku but is caught by Hibari, so she reveals she knows Hibari is transgender and promises to save Kōsaku from his life of perverts and Yakuza. Sabu, who is childhood friends with Kogoro, convinces him to tell Sayuri he was mistaken and Hibari is really a girl. However this becomes unnecessary after Kaji saves Sayuri from dogs and she develops a crush on him, completely forgetting about Kōsaku.
30	"Watch Out for the Mouse Kid Thief!!"; Transliteration: "Kaitō Mausu Kiddo ni Goyōjin!!" (Japanese: 怪盗マウスキッドに御用心!!)	Nobumichi Kawamura	Shigeru Yanagawa	December 16, 1983
Billionaire Kaneda Kanesuke reveals he is the brother of Kōsaku's mother, Harue. Hibari and Kōsaku fly to Kaneda's mansion to meet him, just in time for the thief, Phantom Thief Mouse Kid, to warn Kaneda he plans to steal his favourite statue, Thinking White Alligator. Ibari and Seiji arrive, having been worried about Kōsaku, and Ibari clashes with Kaneda who wants to take Kōsaku to America. While guarding the statue they are knocked out by sleeping gas. Kaneda reveals he is Phantom Thief Mouse Kid, and he wanted to see if Kōsaku had potential to become a thief, but decides Kōsaku is a disappointment. He steals the statue so he can claim the insurance money, but is caught by Hibari. Ibari is outraged on Kōsaku's behalf that his uncle is a no good thief and scares him off. Ibari hides the truth from Kōsaku and claims Kaneda returned to America. However, Hibari and Seiji discover Kaneda was the brother of another Harue who lived in a completely different city, meaning he was not Kōsaku's uncle after all. Kōsaku is happy to have the Ōzora's as his family. He then falls off the roof trying to escape Hibari's proposal of marriage.
31	"Invite Everyone to a Merry Birthday!!"; Transliteration: "Minna Yonde Merī Tanjōbi!!" (Japanese: みんな呼んでメリー誕生日!!)	Yoshinori Kanemori	Shigeru Yanagawa	December 23, 1983
Hibari and Seiji show their Christmas costumes, in Hibari's case, pink lingerie which enrages Ibari. Suzume's birthday is on Christmas Eve so Ibari plans a party. Hibari's shameless flirting with Kōsaku gives Ibari another heart attack. Hibari invites the boxing club while Kōsaku invites Rie, but she already has plans with Shiina. However Shiina hears about the Ōzora's party and invites himself, hoping to seduce Hibari. Kōsaku finally snaps after seeing Shiina upset Rie again and brawls with him. Kōsaku decides he needs to tell Rie Hibari is a boy, and Hibari agrees. However, when Kōsaku tries to tell Rie the truth he decides it is not worth the risk. Rie decides to go to the party with Shiina. Hibari, who knew Kōsaku would chicken out, kisses him for keeping her secret. Most of the characters seen so far arrive for the party, though Ibari chases away the more perverted ones. During the dancing Suzume gives Ibari a present from all his children, a music box that plays Silent Night, causing him to cry from happiness. Kōsaku has a vision of his mother telling him to accept Hibari's love, though this turns out to be Hibari playing a prank hoping Kōsaku will marry her.
32	"Fairy SF!? The Pillow's Genji Hibari Picture Scroll"; Transliteration: "Otogi SF!? Makura no Genji Hibari Emaki" (Japanese: おとぎSF!?枕の源氏ひばり絵巻)	Keiko Imazawa	Hiroshi Toda	January 6, 1984
Kōsaku dreams of himself as a Heian era Lord and Hibari a Geisha. Everybody goes shopping in Heian era clothing. Shiina arrives riding a bull so Hibari has Seiji throw the bull into the air. An ogre appears so Amachi has the entire city gather to hunt the ogre, declaring the man who defeats it will earn a kiss from Iwasaki. Yakkun fires a cannon of pesticide at the ogre, causing it to shrink to a few inches tall. Hibari stands up for the ogre, as he has not done anything wrong. The ogre, named Oni, hides in the Ōzora house and becomes friends with everyone who touches his glowing fingertip. Oni wants to return to his home planet but forgot where he parked his keyhole shaped UFO. Kōsaku recognises the shape as a cemetery next to Heian palace. They escape with Oni in a carriage but are chased by Amachi and the citizens. Oni causes the carriage to float all the way to his missing spaceship where he gifts Suzume the glow from his fingertip before returning to space. Hibari tries to kiss Kōsaku so he chases after the spaceship begging them to take him with them.
33	"Pandemonium!! Hibari is Kōsaku, Kōsaku is Hibari"; Transliteration: "Daikonsen!! Hibari ga Kōsaku, Kōsaku ga Hibari" (Japanese: 大混線!!ひばりが耕作・耕作がひばり)	Takashi Saijō	Hiroshi Toda	January 13, 1984
Kōsaku and Hibari share a dream of Kōsaku winning the World Boxing Championship and then marrying Hibari. They wake up and realise they have switched bodies. They consult an Occult enthusiast, Occult Ittosai, who informs them that while they were dreaming their souls left their bodies and accidentally returned to the wrong bodies. The only solution is to share another dream and return to the correct bodies. At school everyone is confused as Kōsaku suddenly appears to be a perfect student while Hibari has become a clumsy idiot. At boxing club Hibari knocks out Shiina so Kaji chooses Kōsaku to fight a champion boxer from a rival high school. That night Kōsaku and Hibari successfully share a dream and return to their own bodies. During the match Kōsaku is beaten severely so Hibari convinces him they have switched bodies again, making him believe he is Hibari. Kōsaku defeats the champion then passes out when Hibari reveals he is still himself and won the fight all by himself. The next morning Kōsaku realises everybody in the Ōzora house has switched bodies except himself and Hibari and hugs her. Hibari then reveals it was a prank to get Kōsaku to hug her.
34	"Ahem! Shōwa's Okita-kun!!"; Transliteration: "Gohhon! Shōwa no Okita-kun!!" (Japanese: ゴッホン!昭和の沖田くん!!)	Yoshinori Kanemori	Shigeru Yanagawa	January 20, 1984
Kaji gets drunk and tries to kiss Tsubame, but kisses Ibari by mistake giving him a heart attack. As another boxing match is coming up Hibari and Kōsaku try to convince Tsubame to date Kaji for a few days. Tsubame refuses as she prefers honourable men like Okita Sōji. Kaji becomes ill and is sent to hospital so Hibari manipulates Tsubame into visiting him. Tsubame meets Kaji's mother, who has an identical face to Kaji. Tsubame blames herself for Kaji's illness and decides to visit every day, though Ibari forbids it as Kaji is a pervert. The boxing club start to lose morale without Kaji. Tsubame visits him every day until the match. Despite still being ill Kaji insists on fighting the final round of the match but cheats by claiming he has tuberculosis, scaring his opponent, and is disqualified. Kaji's illness turns out to be a Coughing Bug that made Kaji cough whenever he got excited, and his nurse removes it in an unorthodox manner. Tsubame is slightly disappointed but still claims Kaji is not her type. Kōsaku suspects she is hiding her true feelings. Hibari tries to kiss Kōsaku who is so surprised he accidentally swallows the Coughing Bug.
35	"Superhuman Hibari?! Leap Through Time!!"; Transliteration: "Chōjin Hibari?! Toki o Kakeru!!" (Japanese: 超人ひばり?!時をかける!!)	Nobumichi Kawamura	Tokio Tsuchiya	January 27, 1984
The white alligators are revealed to be ghosts possessing Ibari, though really they want to possess Hibari, but Hibari has a mystical barrier that prevents possession. Daisuke, Kōsaku's eternal rival, sends him pickled leeks as a gift. Hibari is revealed to hate leeks and passes out, causing the barrier to disappear and the alligators finally possess her. Hibari develops psychic powers as a result of the alligator's possession, including time travel. She correctly predicts Kōsaku will fail his math test and exposes Kaori for cheating. Kaori's friends overhear that Hibari is scared of leeks. Kaori challenges Hibari to a duel so Hibari attends with Kōsaku and dozens of White Alligator ghosts. Kaori tries to force Hibari to eat leeks but the Alligators protect Hibari by eating the leeks themselves, this combines them into one giant White Alligator that is visible to everybody. Hibari eats a leek by mistake, which restores her barrier and exorcises the alligators. In the end Hibari realises she loves leeks while Kōsaku develops a leek phobia. Hibari announces that the series has reached its final episode but is sure she will continue travelling the terrifying Perverted World with Kōsaku forever. The episode ends with Hibari chasing Kōsaku who cries out "Stop!! Hibari-kun."
