= List of Kinnikuman episodes =

2008 Kinnikuman Box DVD set.

The Kinnikuman manga by Yudetamago was adapted into two anime television series by Toei Animation. The original series, simply titled Kinnikuman (キン肉マン) aired on Nippon Television (NTV) affiliates from April 3, 1983, to October 1, 1986, lasting 137 episodes. The second series, Kinnikuman: Scramble for the Throne (キン肉マン キン肉星王位争奪編, Kinnikuman Kinniku-sei Ōi Sōdatsu Hen), aired on NTV affiliates from October 6, 1991, to September 27, 1992, with 46 episodes.

== Kinnikuman ==
=== Season 1 ===
Arcs: Kaijū Extermination (#1–6), 20th Choujin Olympics (#7–18), American Tour (#19–26), 21st Choujin Olympics (#27–47)

No.	Title	Directed by	Animation directed by	Art directed by	Original release date
1	"Messenger From Planet Kinniku"; Transliteration: "Kinniku-sei Kara no Shisha no Maki" (Japanese: キン肉星からの使者の巻)	Yasuo Yamayoshi	Eikichi Takahashi	Eritachi Tomoko	April 3, 1983
1	"The Man From America"; Transliteration: "Amerika Kara Kita Otoko no Maki" (Japanese: アメリカからきた男の巻)	Yasuo Yamayoshi	Eikichi Takahashi	Eritachi Tomoko	April 3, 1983
"Messenger From Planet Kinniku": Meat arrives from Planet Kinniku to retrieve the prince, Kinnikuman. "The Man From America": Terryman comes to Japan and takes over Kinnikuman's turf.
2	"The Target is Nessie!"; Transliteration: "Hyouteki wa Neshii! No Maki" (Japanese: 標的はネッシー！の巻)	Tetsuo Imazawa	Ooshika Hideaki	Eritachi Tomoko	April 10, 1983
2	"Save Planet Kinniku!"; Transliteration: "Kinniku-sei wo Sukue! No Maki" (Japanese: キン肉星を救え！の巻)	Tetsuo Imazawa	Ooshika Hideaki	Eritachi Tomoko	April 10, 1983
"The Target is Nessie!": In order to boost his public image, Kinnikuman wants to fight Nessie on live TV. "Save Planet Kinniku!": Kinnikuman returns to Planet Kinniku to fight King Tōn.
3	"Space Monster Invasion"; Transliteration: "Uchuu Kaijuu Shuurai no Maki" (Japanese: 宇宙怪獣襲来の巻)	Takenori Kawada	Toshio Mori	Eritachi Tomoko	April 17, 1983
3	"Kinnikuman's Great Hustle"; Transliteration: "Kinnikuman Dai Hassuru no Maki" (Japanese: キン肉マン大ハッスルの巻)	Takenori Kawada	Toshio Mori	Eritachi Tomoko	April 17, 1983
"Space Monster Invasion": Because all of the other superheroes are busy, Kinnikuman is asked to fight an alien invasion. "Kinnikuman's Great Hustle": Kinnikuman and Meat compete over the pretty kindergarten teacher, Mari Nikaidou.
4	"Groovy Natsuko"; Transliteration: "Tonderu Natsuko no Maki" (Japanese: 翔んでるナツコの巻)	Akinori Ōrai	Akira Shinoda	Eritachi Tomoko	April 24, 1983
4	"Annoying Part-Time Jobs"; Transliteration: "Arubaito wa Tsurai yo no Maki" (Japanese: アルバイトはつらいよの巻)	Akinori Ōrai	Hirohide Shikishima	Eritachi Tomoko	April 24, 1983
"Groovy Natsuko": Journalist Natsuko wants to interview Kinnikuman; Iwao plots revenge on Kinnikuman. "Annoying Part-Time Jobs": Kinnikuman and Meat are forced to take part-time jobs.
5	"Kinkotsuman and The Battle of Flesh and Blood"; Transliteration: "Kinkotsuman to Kouniku no Orasoi no Maki" (Japanese: キン骨マンと骨肉の争いの巻)	Takenori Kawada	Toshio Mori	Eritachi Tomoko	May 1, 1983
5	"Kinnikuman's Broken Heart"; Transliteration: "Kinnikuman Shitsuren no Maki" (Japanese: キン肉マン失恋の巻)	Takenori Kawada	Toshio Mori	Eritachi Tomoko	May 1, 1983
"Kinkotsuman and The Battle of Flesh and Blood": Kinkotsuman arrives and challenges Kinnikuman to a fight. "Kinnikuman's Broken Heart": Kinnikuman tries to woo pop idol Nana Takahara.
6	"Kinnikuman is Sexy!?"; Transliteration: "Motemote!? Kinnikuman no Maki" (Japanese: モテモテ！？キン肉マンの巻)	Directed by : Takao Yoshizawa; Storyboarded by : Suzume Kamo	Daizou Takeuchi	Eiji Itō	May 8, 1983
6	"The Competition's Japanese Representative"; Transliteration: "Nippon Daihyou ni Nari Tai no Maki" (Japanese: 日本代表になりたいの巻)	Directed by : Takao Yoshizawa; Storyboarded by : Suzume Kamo	Daizou Takeuchi	Eiji Itō	May 8, 1983
"Kinnikuman is Sexy!?": Kinkotsuman, Iwao, and other Kaijū pose as pretty fangirls of Kinnikuman in order to capture and torture him. "The Competition's Japanese Representative": Kinnikuman is not chosen to be the Japanese Representative of the Choujin Olympics; Robin Mask tests Kinnikuman's abilities.
7	"Hero Olympics"; Transliteration: "Hiiro Orinpikku no Maki" (Japanese: ヒーローオリンピックの巻)	-	-	-	May 15, 1983
7	"Kinkotsuman's Trap"; Transliteration: "Kinkotsuman no Wana no Maki" (Japanese: キン骨マンのワナの巻)	-	-	-	May 15, 1983
8	"Space Marathon"; Transliteration: "Uchuu Marason no Maki" (Japanese: 宇宙マラソンの巻)	-	-	-	May 22, 1983
8	"Deciding Match Battle Royal"; Transliteration: "Kessen Batoru Roiyaru no Maki" (Japanese: 決戦バトルロイヤルの巻)	-	-	-	May 22, 1983
9	"Natsuko Becomes Giant"; Transliteration: "Natsuko Kyojin ni Naru no Maki" (Japanese: ナツコ巨人になるの巻)	-	-	-	May 29, 1983
9	"The Hidden Secret"; Transliteration: "Kakusa Reta Himitsu no Maki" (Japanese: かくされた秘密の巻)	-	-	-	May 29, 1983
10	"Gong on the Tournament Finals"; Transliteration: "Gongu Kesshou Toonamento no Maki" (Japanese: ゴング決勝トーナメントの巻)	-	-	-	June 5, 1983
10	"Watch Out Terryman"; Transliteration: "Ayaushi Teriiman no Maki" (Japanese: 危うしテリーマンの巻)	-	-	-	June 5, 1983
11	"The Great Reversal"; Transliteration: "Dai Gyakuten no Maki" (Japanese: 大逆転の巻)	-	-	-	June 12, 1983
11	"Ice Top Death Match"; Transliteration: "Hishou Desumatchi no Maki" (Japanese: 氷上デスマッチの巻)	-	-	-	June 12, 1983
12	"The Deadly Camel Clutch"; Transliteration: "Shi no Kyameru Kuratchi no Maki" (Japanese: 死のキャメルクラッチの巻)	-	-	-	June 19, 1983
12	"It's Showing! The Spirit of The West"; Transliteration: "Miyo! Ko no Seibu Tamashii no Maki" (Japanese: 見よ！この西部魂の巻)	-	-	-	June 19, 1983
13	"Terryman's Demonic Transformation"; Transliteration: "Teriiman Akuma ni Henshin no Maki" (Japanese: テリーマン悪魔に変身の巻)	-	-	-	June 26, 1983
13	"The Killer Boston Crab"; Transliteration: "Hissatsu Bosuton Kurabu no Maki" (Japanese: 必殺ボストンクラブの巻)	-	-	-	June 26, 1983
14	"Zangyaku Appears!"; Transliteration: "Zangyaku Seijin Ganzuru! No Maki" (Japanese: ザンギャク星人現る！の巻)	-	-	-	July 3, 1983
14	"Kinnikuman Advances to the Finals"; Transliteration: "Kinnikuman - Kesshou Shinshuu no Maki" (Japanese: キン肉マン・決勝進出の巻)	-	-	-	July 3, 1983
15	"Secret Snowy Mountain Training"; Transliteration: "Yuki Yama Himitsu Tokkun no Maki" (Japanese: 雪山秘密特訓の巻)	-	-	-	July 10, 1983
15	"Ramenman's Great Outburst"; Transliteration: "Ramenman Dai Abare no Maki" (Japanese: ラーメンマン大暴れの巻)	-	-	-	July 10, 1983
16	"Let's Go! Fighting Style"; Transliteration: "Ikuzo! Sentou Sutairu no Maki" (Japanese: 行くぞ！戦闘スタイルの巻)	-	-	-	July 17, 1983
16	"It's Here! The Human Rocket"; Transliteration: "De ta! Ningen Roketto no Maki" (Japanese: 出た！人間ロケットの巻)	-	-	-	July 17, 1983
17	"Terrifying! Robin's Killer Techniques"; Transliteration: "Kyoufu! Robin Hissatsu Waza no Maki" (Japanese: 恐怖！ロビン必殺技の巻)	-	-	-	July 24, 1983
17	"Course of Death"; Transliteration: "Shi no koosu no maki" (Japanese: 死のコースの巻)	-	-	-	July 24, 1983
18	"The Electrifying Hellish Message"; Transliteration: "Denki Anma no Jigoku da ze no Maki" (Japanese: 電気アンマの地獄だぜの巻)	-	-	-	July 31, 1983
18	"Can Kinnikuman Turn it Around?"; Transliteration: "Kinnikuman Gyakuten Naru ka? No Maki" (Japanese: キン肉マン逆転なるか？の巻)	-	-	-	July 31, 1983
19	"Kinnikuman Flies Around the World"; Transliteration: "Sekai e Kaku Kinnikuman no Maki" (Japanese: 世界へ翔くキン肉マンの巻)	-	-	-	August 7, 1983
19	"Hawaii! The Mysterious Kamehame"; Transliteration: "Hawai! Kamehame no Nazo no Maki" (Japanese: ハワイ！カメハメの謎の巻)	-	-	-	August 7, 1983
20	"The 7 Second Fall!"; Transliteration: "7 Byou Fooru! No Maki" (Japanese: 7秒フォール！の巻)	-	-	-	August 14, 1983
20	"The No Rope Deathmatch"; Transliteration: "Noo Roopu Desumatchi no Maki" (Japanese: ノーロープデスマッチの巻)	-	-	-	August 14, 1983
21	"Kinnikuman's One-Shot Fight"; Transliteration: "Faito Ippatsu Kinnikuman no Maki" (Japanese: ファイト一発キン肉マンの巻)	-	-	-	August 28, 1983
21	"Finishing Move: Fuu Rin Ka Zan"; Transliteration: "Hissatsu Waza - Fuu Rin Ka Zan no Maki" (Japanese: 必殺技・風林火山の巻)	-	-	-	August 28, 1983
22	"The Choujin League Crumbles!"; Transliteration: "Choujin Domei wo Tao se! No Maki" (Japanese: 超人同盟を倒せ！の巻)	-	-	-	September 4, 1983
22	"Watch Out Suguru"; Transliteration: "Ayaushi Suguru no Maki" (Japanese: 危うしスグルの巻)	-	-	-	September 4, 1983
23	"The Terrifying Magician Appears"; Transliteration: "Kyoufu no Majishan Tojou no Maki" (Japanese: 恐怖のマジシャン登場の巻)	-	-	-	September 11, 1983
23	"The 4th Killer Technique"; Transliteration: "4 Banme no Satsujin Waza no Maki" (Japanese: 4番目の殺人技の巻)	-	-	-	September 11, 1983
24	"Tendon vs Kinnikuman"; Transliteration: "Tendoon Tai Kinnikuman no Maki" (Japanese: テンドーン対キン肉マンの巻)	-	-	-	September 18, 1983
24	"Skull Boze's Secret"; Transliteration: "Sukaru Boozu no Himitsu no Maki" (Japanese: スカルポーズの秘密の巻)	-	-	-	September 18, 1983
25	"Robin Mask Returns"; Transliteration: "Robin Masuku Saitoujou no Maki" (Japanese: ロビンマスク再登場の巻)	-	-	-	September 25, 1983
25	"Duel at the Amazon Ravine"; Transliteration: "Kettou! Amazon Daikeikoku no Maki" (Japanese: 決闘！アマゾン大渓谷の巻)	-	-	-	September 25, 1983
26	"The Hellish Midair Deathmatch"; Transliteration: "Jigoku no Kuuchuu Desumatchi no Maki" (Japanese: 地獄の空中デスマッチの巻)	-	-	-	October 2, 1983
26	"The End of Robin Mask"; Transliteration: "Robin Masuku no Saigo no Maki" (Japanese: ロビンマスクの最後の巻)	-	-	-	October 2, 1983
27	"The Choujin Olympics Again"; Transliteration: "Futatabi Choujin Orinpikku no Maki" (Japanese: 再び超人オリンピックの巻)	-	-	-	October 9, 1983
27	"The Insanely Strong Rikishiman Appears"; Transliteration: "Kairiki Rikishiman Toujou no Maki" (Japanese: 怪力リキシマン登場の巻)	-	-	-	October 9, 1983
28	"The Choujin Sieve Drop"; Transliteration: "Choujin Furui Otoshi no Maki" (Japanese: 超人ふるい落としの巻)	-	-	-	October 16, 1983
28	"The Challenge of the Gasoline Pool"; Transliteration: "Gasorin Puuru ni Chousen no Maki" (Japanese: ガソリンプールに挑戦の巻)	-	-	-	October 16, 1983
29	"Kinniku Edition: Love and Youth"; Transliteration: "Kinnikuban - Ai to Seishun no Maki" (Japanese: キン肉版・愛と青春の巻)	-	-	-	October 23, 1983
29	"Kick the Bullet Train"; Transliteration: "Shikansen wo Ketto ba se no Maki" (Japanese: 新幹線をケッとばせの巻)	-	-	-	October 23, 1983
30	"The Final Preliminary: Choujin Dropping Ravine"; Transliteration: "Saishuu Yosen - Choujin Otoshi no Tani no Maki" (Japanese: 最終予選・超人落しの谷の巻)	-	-	-	October 30, 1983
30	"The Deadly Roller Game"; Transliteration: "Shi no Rooraa Geemuu no Maki" (Japanese: 死のローラーゲームの巻)	-	-	-	October 30, 1983
31	"Deadly Struggle Before the Goal"; Transliteration: "Gooru Sen no Shitou no Maki" (Japanese: ゴール前の死闘の巻)	-	-	-	November 6, 1983
31	"The Choujin are Pachinko Balls"; Transliteration: "Choujin wa Pachinko Tama no Maki" (Japanese: 超人はパチンコ玉の巻)	-	-	-	November 6, 1983
32	"Warsman: The Iron Claw"; Transliteration: "Woozuman - Tetsu no Tsume no Maki" (Japanese: ウォーズマン・鉄のツメの巻)	-	-	-	November 13, 1983
32	"Behold! The Killer Wax Lock"; Transliteration: "Mitaka! Rou Katame Satsuhou no Maki" (Japanese: 見たか！ロウ固め殺法の巻)	-	-	-	November 13, 1983
33	"Brocken Jr.'s Challenge"; Transliteration: "Burokken Jr no Chousen no Maki" (Japanese: ブロッケンJrの挑戦の巻)	-	-	-	November 20, 1983
33	"Here is Kinnikuman's Special Move!"; Transliteration: "De ta! Kinnikuman Hissatsu Waza no Maki" (Japanese: 出た！キン肉マン必殺技の巻)	-	-	-	November 20, 1983
34	"The Concrete Deathmatch"; Transliteration: "Konkurii Desumatchi no Maki" (Japanese: コンクリーデスマッチの巻)	-	-	-	November 27, 1983
34	"Brocken Jr.'s Fierce Assault"; Transliteration: "Burokken Jr Moukou no Maki" (Japanese: ブロッケンJr猛攻の巻)	-	-	-	November 27, 1983
35	"Secret Technique: Great Wall of China"; Transliteration: "Higi - Banri no Choujou no Maki" (Japanese: 秘技・万里の長城の巻)	-	-	-	December 4, 1983
35	"Battle of the American-Soviet Choujin"; Transliteration: "Beiso Choujin Gekitotsu! No Maki" (Japanese: 米ソ超人激突！の巻)	-	-	-	December 4, 1983
36	"Benkiman's Trap"; Transliteration: "Benkiman no Wana no Maki" (Japanese: ベンキーマンの罠の巻)	-	-	-	December 11, 1983
36	"Ramenman is a True Choujin"; Transliteration: "Ramenman wa Shinno Choujin no Maki" (Japanese: ラーメンマンは真の超人の巻)	-	-	-	December 11, 1983
37	"The Sumo Choujin Rikishiman"; Transliteration: "Sumou Choujin Rikishiman no Maki" (Japanese: スモウ超人リキシマンの巻)	-	-	-	December 18, 1983
37	"To the Edge of the Dohyo"; Transliteration: "Dohyougiwa ni Kakero! No Maki" (Japanese: 土俵際にかけろ！の巻)	-	-	-	December 18, 1983
38	"The Casket Deathmatch"; Transliteration: "Kanoke Desumatchi no Maki" (Japanese: 棺桶デスマッチの巻)	-	-	-	January 8, 1984
38	"The Fighting Machine Choujin"; Transliteration: "Tatatkau Kikai Choujin no Maki" (Japanese: 戦う機械超人の巻)	-	-	-	January 8, 1984
39	"The Deadly Bear Claws"; Transliteration: "Shi no Beaa Kuroo no Maki" (Japanese: 死のベアークローの巻)	-	-	-	January 8, 1984
39	"The Scrambled Soft-Serve Counter"; Transliteration: "Sukuranburu - Sofuto Kashi no Maki" (Japanese: スクランブル・ソフト返しの巻)	-	-	-	January 8, 1984
40	"The Mask Removal Deathmatch"; Transliteration: "Fukumen Hagi Desumatchi! No Maki" (Japanese: 覆面はぎデスマッチ！の巻)	-	-	-	January 15, 1984
40	"Ramenman's Oath"; Transliteration: "Ramenman to no Chikai no Maki" (Japanese: ラーメンマンとの誓いの巻)	-	-	-	January 15, 1984
41	"Defeat the Palo Special"; Transliteration: "Paro - Supesharu wo Yabure no Maki" (Japanese: パロ・スペシャルを破れの巻)	-	-	-	January 22, 1984
41	"It's the Kinniku Buster!"; Transliteration: "De ta! Kinniku Basutaa no Maki" (Japanese: 出た！キン肉バスターの巻)	-	-	-	January 22, 1984
42	"The Day of the Finals Arrives!"; Transliteration: "Kessen no hi Kitaru! No Maki" (Japanese: 決戦の日きたる！の巻)	-	-	-	January 29, 1984
42	"Who is Barracuda's True Identity!?"; Transliteration: "Barakuuda no Shoutai wa!? No Maki" (Japanese: バラクーダの正体は！？の巻)	-	-	-	January 29, 1984
43	"The Terrifying Computer Choujin"; Transliteration: "Kyoufu! Konpyuuta Choujin no Maki" (Japanese: 恐怖！コンピュータ超人の巻)	-	-	-	February 5, 1984
43	"The Torn Mask"; Transliteration: "Hikisa Kareta Masuku no Maki" (Japanese: 引き裂かれたマスクの巻)	-	-	-	February 5, 1984
44	"The Crucial Technique: Kinniku Guard"; Transliteration: "Gokui - Kinniku Gaado no Maki" (Japanese: 極意・キン肉ガードの巻)	-	-	-	February 12, 1984
44	"The Greatest Crisis!"; Transliteration: "Saidai no Pinchi! No Maki" (Japanese: 最大のピンチ！の巻)	-	-	-	February 12, 1984
45	"Robin Mask's Revenge"; Transliteration: "Robin Masuku no Fukushuu no Maki" (Japanese: ロビンマスクの復讐の巻)	-	-	-	February 19, 1984
45	"Burning Inner Strength!"; Transliteration: "Kajiba no Kuso Chikara! No Maki" (Japanese: 火事場のクソ力！の巻)	-	-	-	February 19, 1984
46	"A Fierce 90 Minute! One Round Match"; Transliteration: "Shitou 90 Fun! Ipponshoubu no Maki" (Japanese: 死闘90分！一本勝負の巻)	-	-	-	February 26, 1984
46	"Kinnikuman Gives Up!?"; Transliteration: "Gibu Appu!? Kinnikuman no Maki" (Japanese: ギブアップ！？キン肉マンの巻)	-	-	-	February 26, 1984
47	"The Burning Soul Calls For a Miracle!!"; Transliteration: "Kiseki wo Yobu Honoo no Tamashii!! No Maki" (Japanese: 奇跡を呼ぶ炎の魂！！の巻)	-	-	-	March 4, 1984
47	"The First Two-Time Champion!"; Transliteration: "Shijou Hatsu! V2 no Maki" (Japanese: 史上初！V2の巻)	-	-	-	March 4, 1984

=== Season 2 ===
Arcs: Seven Devil Choujin (#48–65), Golden Mask (#66–86)

No.	Title	Original release date
48	"The Seven Devil Choujin Appear!!"; Transliteration: "Shuuban!! Shichinin no Akuma Choujin no Maki" (Japanese: 出現！！七人の悪魔超人の巻)	March 11, 1984
48	"Meat is Torn Apart"; Transliteration: "Barabara ni Sareta Miito no Maki" (Japanese: バラバラにされたミートの巻)	March 11, 1984
49	"The Devil Choujin Series Begins"; Transliteration: "Akuma Choujin Shiriizu Hajimaru no Maki" (Japanese: 悪魔超人シリーズ始まるの巻)	March 18, 1984
49	"The Hellish Stereo-Cassette King"; Transliteration: "Jigoku no Sutekase Kingu no Maki" (Japanese: 地獄のステカセキングの巻)	March 18, 1984
50	"The Devil's Symphony"; Transliteration: "Akuma no Shinfonii no Maki" (Japanese: 悪魔のシンフォニーの巻)	March 25, 1984
50	"Secret Technique! Three Minute Kill"; Transliteration: "Higi! Sanpun Koroshi no Maki" (Japanese: 秘技！三分殺しの巻)	March 25, 1984
51	"Devil Choujin Black Hole"; Transliteration: "Akuma Choujin Burakku Hooru no Maki" (Japanese: 悪魔超人ブラックホールの巻)	April 1, 1984
51	"Terrifying 4-D Wrestling"; Transliteration: "Senritsu no Yojigen Resuringu no Maki" (Japanese: 戦慄の四次元レスリングの巻)	April 1, 1984
52	"The Shadow Hitman's Clone Technique!"; Transliteration: "Kage no Koroshiya! Bunshin Waza no Maki" (Japanese: 影の殺し屋！分身技の巻)	April 8, 1984
52	"Life or Death!? The Pit of Darkness"; Transliteration: "Ika Shika!? Ankoku no Otoshiana no Maki" (Japanese: 生か死か！？暗黒の落し穴の巻)	April 8, 1984
53	"I Did It! The Yellow Hole"; Transliteration: "Yatta! Ieroo Hooru no Maki" (Japanese: やった！！イエローホールの巻)	April 15, 1984
53	"I am Eternally Immortal!!"; Transliteration: "Watashi wa Eien ni Fumetsu Desu!! No Maki" (Japanese: 私は永遠に不滅です！！の巻)	April 15, 1984
54	"The Idol Choujin vs The Devil Choujin"; Transliteration: "Aidoru Choujin Tai Akuma Choujin no Maki" (Japanese: アイドル超人対悪魔超人の巻)	April 22, 1984
54	"The Devil Choujin's All-out Assault!!"; Transliteration: "Soukougeki!! Akuma Choujin no Maki" (Japanese: 総攻撃！！悪魔超人の巻)	April 22, 1984
55	"The Dreadful Devil Spring"; Transliteration: "Kyoufu no Debiru Tomubooi no Maki" (Japanese: 恐怖のデビルトムボーイの巻)	April 29, 1984
55	"The Underwater Showdown"; Transliteration: "Suichuu Dai Sakusen no Maki" (Japanese: 水中大作戦の巻)	April 29, 1984
56	"The Dreaded Mummy Package!!"; Transliteration: "Kyoufu!! Miira Pakkegi no Maki" (Japanese: 恐怖！！ミイラパッケージの巻)	May 6, 1984
56	"Finishing Move!! Hell Fang"; Transliteration: "Hissatsu Waza!! Kiba Jigoku no Maki" (Japanese: 必殺技！！キバ地獄の巻)	May 6, 1984
57	"Who is the Mysterious Choujin!?"; Transliteration: "Nazo no Choujin no Shoutai wa!? No Maki" (Japanese: 謎の超人の正体は！？の巻)	May 13, 1984
57	"The Trump Card: Bear Claws"; Transliteration: "Denka no Houtou - Bea Kuroo no Maki" (Japanese: 伝家の宝刀・ベアクローの巻)	May 13, 1984
58	"The Revival of the Human Spirit"; Transliteration: "Yomigaetta Ningen no Kokoro no Maki" (Japanese: 甦った人間の心の巻)	May 20, 1984
58	"The Double Bear Claws"; Transliteration: "Daburu Bea Kuroo no Maki" (Japanese: ダブルベアクローの巻)	May 20, 1984
59	"Terryman Falls into the Ravine"; Transliteration: "Tanisoko ni Rakusa ta Teriiman" (Japanese: 谷底に落ちたテリーマン)	May 27, 1984
59	"The Mysterious Red Spots!"; Transliteration: "Nazo no Akai Hanten! No Maki" (Japanese: 謎の赤い斑点！の巻)	May 27, 1984
60	"The Devil Choujin's Blood Bind"; Transliteration: "Akuma Choujin Chi Shibari no Maki" (Japanese: 悪魔超人血しばりの巻)	June 3, 1984
60	"The Intense St. Helens Eruption"; Transliteration: "Kyourotsu Sento Herenzu Funka no Maki" (Japanese: 強烈セントへレンズ噴火の巻)	June 3, 1984
61	"Rescue Meat, Kinnikuman"; Transliteration: "Miito wo Sukue Kinnikuman no Maki" (Japanese: ミートを救えキン肉マンの巻)	June 10, 1984
61	"The Mysterious Choujin Mongolman"; Transliteration: "Nazo no Choujin Mongoruman no Maki" (Japanese: 謎の超人モンゴルマンの巻)	June 10, 1984
62	"The Shower of Hell"; Transliteration: "Jigoku no Shawaa no Maki" (Japanese: 地獄のシャワーの巻)	June 17, 1984
62	"10 Million Power at Full-Throttle!"; Transliteration: "Zenkai! 1000 Man Pawaa no Maki" (Japanese: 全開！1000万パワーの巻)	June 17, 1984
63	"The Secret of The Long Horns"; Transliteration: "Rongu Hoon no Himitsu no Maki" (Japanese: ロングホーンの秘密の巻)	June 24, 1984
63	"Burning Reversals"; Transliteration: "Kajiba no Gyakufunsha no Maki" (Japanese: 火事場の逆噴射の巻)	June 24, 1984
64	"The Ring is Torn to Shreds"; Transliteration: "Kiri Chikareta Ringu no Maki" (Japanese: 切り裂かれたリングの巻)	July 1, 1984
64	"It's Here! The Neo Kinniku Buster"; Transliteration: "De ta! Neo Kinniku Basutaa no Maki" (Japanese: 出た！新キン肉バスターの巻)	July 1, 1984
65	"One Second Before the Time Limit!!"; Transliteration: "Taimu Rimitto 1 Byou Sen!! No Maki" (Japanese: タイムリミット1秒前！！の巻)	July 8, 1984
65	"The Ring is the Friendship of Men"; Transliteration: "Ringu wa Otoko no Yuujou no Maki" (Japanese: リングは男の友情の巻)	July 8, 1984
66	"The Legend of the Golden Mask"; Transliteration: "Densetsu no Kogane Masuku no Maki" (Japanese: 伝説の黄金マスクの巻)	October 7, 1984
66	"The Devil Knights' Challenge"; Transliteration: "Akuma Kishi no Chousen no Maki" (Japanese: 悪魔騎士の挑戦の巻)	October 7, 1984
67	"The Outarageous Crocodile Hell!"; Transliteration: "Kaiki! Wani Jigoku no Maki" (Japanese: 怪奇！ワニ地獄の巻)	October 14, 1984
67	"The Molting Choujin Sneagator"; Transliteration: "Dappi Choujin Sunigeetaa no Maki" (Japanese: 脱皮超人スニゲーターの巻)	October 14, 1984
68	"The Vicious Frill-Necked Lizard!!"; Transliteration: "Kyouaku!! Erimakitokage no Maki" (Japanese: 凶悪！！エリマキトカゲの巻)	October 21, 1984
68	"Sneagator's True Form"; Transliteration: "Sunigeetaa no Shoutai no Maki" (Japanese: スニゲーターの正体の巻)	October 21, 1984
69	"The Silver Mask Causes a Miracle"; Transliteration: "Kiseki wo Yobu Shirogane Masuku no Maki" (Japanese: 奇蹟を呼ぶ銀マスク の巻)	October 28, 1984
69	"The Life Giving Dohyo Entrance"; Transliteration: "Inochi Age Masu Dohyou Iri no Maki" (Japanese: 命あげます土俵入り の巻)	October 28, 1984
70	"Planetman's Space Hell"; Transliteration: "Uchuu Jigoku Puranetoman no Maki" (Japanese: 宇宙地獄プラネットマン の巻)	November 4, 1984
70	"The Justice Choujin Eliminated?!"; Transliteration: "Seigi Choujin Zenmetsu ka?! No Maki" (Japanese: 正義超人全滅か?! の巻)	November 4, 1984
71	"Geronimo's War Cry"; Transliteration: "Jeronimo no Otakebi no Maki" (Japanese: ジェロニモのおたけび の巻)	November 11, 1984
71	"Chased to the Depths of Hell"; Transliteration: "Jigoku no Soko Made oi Kakero no Maki" (Japanese: 地獄の底まで追いかけろ の巻)	November 11, 1984
72	"The Deadly Five Story Ring"; Transliteration: "Shi no Gojuu Ringu no Maki" (Japanese: 死の五重リング の巻)	November 18, 1984
72	"Junkman's Counterattack!"; Transliteration: "Hangeki! Jankuman no Maki" (Japanese: 反撃!ジャンクマン の巻)	November 18, 1984
73	"Behold the Robin Tactics!"; Transliteration: "Mitaka! Kono Robin Senpou no Maki" (Japanese: 見たか!このロビン戦法 の巻)	November 25, 1984
73	"The Ninja's Binding Spider Web"; Transliteration: "Za Ninja Kumoito Shibari no Maki" (Japanese: ザ・ニンジャくも糸縛り の巻)	November 25, 1984
74	"Here it is! The Red Rain of Berlin"; Transliteration: "Deta! Berurin no Akai Ame no Maki" (Japanese: 出た!ベルリンの赤い雨 の巻)	December 2, 1984
74	"The Hellish Technique: Ashura Buster"; Transliteration: "Jigoku Waza Ashura Basutaa no Maki" (Japanese: 地獄技アシュラバスター の巻)	December 2, 1984
75	"Both Arms Stolen"; Transliteration: "Ubawareta Moroude no Maki" (Japanese: 奪われた両腕 の巻)	December 9, 1984
75	"Warsman in Danger!"; Transliteration: "Ayaushi! Uoozuman no Maki" (Japanese: 危うし!ウォーズマン の巻)	December 9, 1984
76	"Terryman Prepares for Death"; Transliteration: "Shi wo Kakugo Shita Teriiman no Maki" (Japanese: 死を覚悟したテリーマン の巻)	December 16, 1984
76	"Geronimo's Fierce Assault!"; Transliteration: "Moukou! Jeronimo no Maki" (Japanese: 猛攻!ジェロニモ の巻)	December 16, 1984
77	"Killer Technique: Pyramid of Hell"; Transliteration: "Satsujin Waza Jigoku no Piramiddo no Maki" (Japanese: 殺人技地獄のピラミッド の巻)	December 23, 1984
77	"The Immortal Choujin Spirit"; Transliteration: "Fujimi no Choujin Tamashii no Maki" (Japanese: 不死身の超人魂 の巻)	December 23, 1984
78	"The Mystery of the Golden Mask"; Transliteration: "Kogane Masuku no Nazo no Maki" (Japanese: 黄金マスクのナゾ の巻)	December 30, 1984
78	"Akuma Shogun Appears"; Transliteration: "Akuma Shougun Toujou no Maki" (Japanese: 悪魔将軍登場 の巻)	December 30, 1984
79	"The Explosive Guillotine of Hell!"; Transliteration: "Sakuretsu! Jigoku no Dantoudai no Maki" (Japanese: 炸裂!地獄の断頭台 の巻)	January 6, 1985
79	"Buffaloman Returns!"; Transliteration: "Fukkatsu! Baffarooman no Maki" (Japanese: 復活!バッファローマン の巻)	January 6, 1985
80	"The Stormy Spider Web Hell"; Transliteration: "Arashi wo Yobu Kumo no su Jigoku no Maki" (Japanese: 嵐を呼ぶクモの巣地獄 の巻)	January 13, 1985
80	"The Kinniku Buster, Defeated!"; Transliteration: "Yaburetari! Kinniku Basutaa no Maki" (Japanese: 破れたり!キン肉バスター の巻)	January 13, 1985
81	"Defeat the Ashura Buster"; Transliteration: "Ashura Basutaa wo Yabure no Maki" (Japanese: アシュラバスターを破れ の巻)	January 20, 1985
81	"Buffaloman Rebels!"; Transliteration: "Baffarooman Hangyaku! No Maki" (Japanese: バッファローマン反逆! の巻)	January 20, 1985
82	"Training for the New Finishing Move!"; Transliteration: "Moutokkun! Shin Hissatsuwaza!! No Maki" (Japanese: 猛特訓!新必殺技!! の巻)	January 27, 1985
82	"Direct Hit! Skull Crush"; Transliteration: "Choukugeki! Sukaru Kurasshu no Maki" (Japanese: 直撃!スカルクラッシュ の巻)	January 27, 1985
83	"Akuma Shogun is a Hollow Choujin"; Transliteration: "Akuma Shougun wa Nantai Choujin no Maki" (Japanese: 悪魔将軍は軟体超人 の巻)	February 3, 1985
83	"The Neo Kinniku Buster Explodes"; Transliteration: "Neo Kinniku Basutaa Sakuretsu no Maki" (Japanese: ネオキン肉バスター炸裂 の巻)	February 3, 1985
84	"The Explosive Diamond Power"; Transliteration: "Sakuretsu Daiyamondo Pawaa no Maki" (Japanese: 炸裂ダイアモンドパワー の巻)	February 10, 1985
84	"Burning Megaton Punch"; Transliteration: "Kajiba no Megaton Panchi no Maki" (Japanese: 火事場のメガトンパンチ の巻)	February 10, 1985
85	"The Survival Deathmatch"; Transliteration: "Ikinokori Desumatchi no Maki" (Japanese: 生き残りデスマッチ の巻)	February 17, 1985
85	"The Chairman's Friendship"; Transliteration: "Iinchou no Yuujou no Maki" (Japanese: 委員長の友情 の巻)	February 17, 1985
86	"Kinnikuman vs Akuma Shogun"; Transliteration: "Kinnikuman VS Akuma Shougun no Maki" (Japanese: キン肉マンVS悪魔将軍 の巻)	February 24, 1985
86	"The Victory of Justice and Friendship"; Transliteration: "Seigi to Yuujou no Shouri no Maki" (Japanese: 正義と友情の勝利 の巻)	February 24, 1985

=== Season 3 ===
Arcs: Dream Choujin Tag (#87–119), Ultimate Choujin (#120–124), Nefarious Choujin (#125–137)

No.	Title	Original release date
87	"The Dream Tag Tournament"; Transliteration: "Yume no Taggu Toonamento no Maki" (Japanese: 夢のタッグトーナメント の巻)	1985
87	"Challenge of the Three Barriers!"; Transliteration: "Chousen! Mittsu no Kanmon no Maki" (Japanese: 挑戦!三つの関門 の巻)	1985
88	"Kinnikuman Great Appears"; Transliteration: "Kinnikuman Gureeto Toujou no Maki" (Japanese: キン肉マングレート登場 の巻)	April 14, 1985
88	"Great Riot! Hell's Combination"; Transliteration: "Daiabare! Jigoku no Konbi no Maki" (Japanese: 大暴れ!地獄のコンビ の巻)	April 14, 1985
89	"The Dreadful 4-D Trap"; Transliteration: "Osorubeshi! Yojigen no Wana no Maki" (Japanese: 恐るべし四次元のワナ の巻)	April 21, 1985
89	"Watch Out Kinnikuman Great!"; Transliteration: "Ayaushi! Kinnikuman Gureeto no Maki" (Japanese: 危うし!キン肉マングレート の巻)	April 21, 1985
90	"The Miraculous Muscle Docking"; Transliteration: "Kyoui Massuru Dokkingu no Maki" (Japanese: 驚異マッスルドッキング の巻)	April 21, 1985
90	"Shiver in Fear! The Perfect Choujin"; Transliteration: "Senritsu! Kanpeki Choujin no Maki" (Japanese: 戦慄!完璧超人 の巻)	April 21, 1985
91	"The Bloody Hell's Screwdriver"; Transliteration: "Chi wo Fuku Jigoku no Neji Mawashi no Maki" (Japanese: 血を吹く地獄のネジ廻し の巻)	April 28, 1985
91	"The Don Appears!"; Transliteration: "Shuryou Shutsugen no Maki" (Japanese: 首領(どん)出現! の巻)	April 28, 1985
92	"Big the Budo's True Form"; Transliteration: "Biggu za Budou no Shoutai no Maki" (Japanese: ビッグ・ザ・武道の正体 の巻)	May 5, 1985
92	"Rough Technique! The Robin Special"; Transliteration: "Arawaza! Robin Supesharu no Maki" (Japanese: 荒技!ロビンスペシャル の巻)	May 5, 1985
93	"Remove the Mask"; Transliteration: "Hagasareta Masuku no Maki" (Japanese: はがされたマスク の巻)	May 12, 1985
93	"Robin Mask's Counterattack!"; Transliteration: "Gyakushuu! Robin Masuku no Maki" (Japanese: 逆襲!ロビンマスク の巻)	May 12, 1985
94	"A New Terryman is Born"; Transliteration: "Nyuu Teriiman Tanjou no Maki" (Japanese: ニュー・テリーマン誕生 の巻)	May 19, 1985
94	"Take This! Hell's Tornado"; Transliteration: "Kurae! Tatsumaki Jigoku no Maki" (Japanese: 食らえ!竜巻地獄 の巻)	May 19, 1985
95	"The Cursed Roller Tactic"; Transliteration: "Noroi no Rooraa Sakusen no Maki" (Japanese: 呪いのローラー作戦 の巻)	May 26, 1985
95	"The Hell's Sand Dango Technique"; Transliteration: "Jigoku no Suna Dango no Maki" (Japanese: 地獄の砂団子 の巻)	May 26, 1985
96	"Terryman Returns"; Transliteration: "Teriiman Yomigaeru no Maki" (Japanese: テリーマン甦る の巻)	June 2, 1985
96	"The Bloodthirsty Devil Combo"; Transliteration: "Chi ni Ueta Akuma Konbi no Maki" (Japanese: 血に飢えた悪魔コンビ の巻)	June 2, 1985
97	"The Explosive Hell's Clothesline"; Transliteration: "Jigoku no Kurosurain Sakuretsu no Maki" (Japanese: 地獄のクロスライン炸裂 の巻)	June 9, 1985
97	"Kinnikuman Great's True Identity"; Transliteration: "Kinnikuman Gureeto no Shoutai no Maki" (Japanese: キン肉マングレートの正体 の巻)	June 9, 1985
98	"The Semi-Finals Begin!"; Transliteration: "Junkesshou Hajimaru! No Maki" (Japanese: 準決勝始まる! の巻)	June 16, 1985
98	"The Lumberjack Deathmatch"; Transliteration: "Ranbaa Jyakku Desumatchi no Maki" (Japanese: ランバージャックデスマッチ の巻)	June 16, 1985
99	"Terryman's Anguish"; Transliteration: "Kunou no Teriiman no Maki" (Japanese: 苦悩のテリーマン の巻)	June 23, 1985
99	"Kinnikuman Great Returns"; Transliteration: "Kinnikuman Gureeto Fukkatsu no Maki" (Japanese: キン肉マングレート復活 の巻)	June 23, 1985
100	"Sunshine Magnum"; Transliteration: "Sanshain Magunamu no Maki" (Japanese: サンシャインマグナム の巻)	June 30, 1985
100	"Critical Point! The Sleeping Tanuki Strategy"; Transliteration: "Gokui! Tanukineiri Satsu Shubou no Maki" (Japanese: 極意!タヌキ寝入り殺法 の巻)	June 30, 1985
101	"The Prince of the Demon Realm"; Transliteration: "Makai no Purinsu no Maki" (Japanese: 魔界のプリンス の巻)	July 7, 1985
101	"The Terrifying Ashura Fire Bullets"; Transliteration: "Kyoufu no Ashura Hidama Tama no Maki" (Japanese: 恐怖のアシュラ火玉弾 の巻)	July 7, 1985
102	"The Cursed Roller is Defeated"; Transliteration: "Yabure Tari Noroi no Rooraa no Maki" (Japanese: 破れたり呪いのローラー の巻)	July 14, 1985
102	"Akuma Shogun Returns!?"; Transliteration: "Akuma Shougun Yomigaeru!? No Maki" (Japanese: 悪魔将軍よみがえる!? の巻)	July 14, 1985
103	"The Deomic Spirit Burns Up"; Transliteration: "Moeagaru Akuma Reijutsu no Maki" (Japanese: 燃えあがる悪魔霊術 の巻)	July 21, 1985
103	"Ashuraman Weeps!"; Transliteration: "Ashuraman Naku! No Maki" (Japanese: アシュラマン泣く! の巻)	July 21, 1985
104	"The Friendship Combination"; Transliteration: "Yuujou no Konbineeshon no Maki" (Japanese: 友情のコンビネーション の巻)	July 28, 1985
104	"The End of Sunshine"; Transliteration: "Sanshain no Saigo no Maki" (Japanese: サンシャインの最後 の巻)	July 28, 1985
105	"The Brutal Steel Cage Match"; Transliteration: "Zangoku! Tetsujoumou Matchi no Maki" (Japanese: 残酷!鉄条網マッチ の巻)	August 4, 1985
105	"Watch Out Mongolman!"; Transliteration: "Ayaushi! Mongoruman no Maki" (Japanese: 危うし!モンゴルマン の巻)	August 4, 1985
106	"The Long Horn is Back"; Transliteration: "Yomigaetta Rongu Hoon no Maki" (Japanese: 甦ったロングホーン の巻)	August 11, 1985
106	"The Mountain Ring Crumbles!"; Transliteration: "Houkai! Maunten Ringu no Maki" (Japanese: 崩壊!マウンテンリング の巻)	August 11, 1985
107	"The Pyramid Ring Appears!"; Transliteration: "Piramiddo Ringu Shotsugen! No Maki" (Japanese: ピラミッドリング出現! の巻)	August 18, 1985
107	"Jump for the Hokkaido Sky!"; Transliteration: "Hokkaidou Kuuchuu ni Tobidasu! No Maki" (Japanese: 北海道空中に飛び出す! の巻)	August 18, 1985
108	"The Mystery of the Pyramid Ring"; Transliteration: "Piramiddo Ringu no Nazo no Maki" (Japanese: ピラミッドリングの謎 の巻)	October 6, 1985
108	"The Deadly Thunder Saber!"; Transliteration: "Hissatsu! Sandaa Saaberu no Maki" (Japanese: 必殺!サンダーサーベル の巻)	October 6, 1985
109	"Buffaloman's Friendship"; Transliteration: "Baffarooman no Yuujou no Maki" (Japanese: バッファローマンの友情 の巻)	October 13, 1985
109	"The Magnetic Cross Bomber"; Transliteration: "Jikiarashi Kurosu Bonbaa no Maki" (Japanese: 磁気嵐クロスボンバー の巻)	October 13, 1985
110	"Ramenman Will Never Die!"; Transliteration: "Ramenman Washi Nazu! No Maki" (Japanese: ラーメンマンは死なず! の巻)	October 20, 1985
110	"Kinnikuman's Arm is Taken"; Transliteration: "Ubawareta Kinnikuman no Maki" (Japanese: 奪われたキン肉マンの腕 の巻)	October 20, 1985
111	"The Long Horn of Friendship"; Transliteration: "Yuujou no Rongu Hoon no Maki" (Japanese: 友情のロングホーン の巻)	October 27, 1985
111	"The Finals! Sword Deathmatch"; Transliteration: "Kesshou! Soodo Desumatchi no Maki" (Japanese: 決勝!ソードデスマッチ の巻)	October 27, 1985
112	"The Limitless Three-Part Match"; Transliteration: "Museigen Sanponshoubu no Maki" (Japanese: 無制限三本勝負 の巻)	November 3, 1985
112	"Burning Smart Play"; Transliteration: "Kajiba no Zonou Puree no Maki" (Japanese: 火事場の頭脳プレー の巻)	November 3, 1985
113	"Mask Hunt: 30 Seconds Remain"; Transliteration: "Masuku Gari - Noiri 30 Byou no Maki" (Japanese: マスク狩り・残り30秒 の巻)	November 10, 1985
113	"The Explosive Magnetic Crash!"; Transliteration: "Sakuretsu! Jiki Kurashu no Maki" (Japanese: 炸裂!磁気クラッシュ の巻)	November 10, 1985
114	"The First Defeat!"; Transliteration: "Hatsu no Haiboku! No Maki" (Japanese: 初の敗北! の巻)	November 17, 1985
114	"Ashuraman's Friendship"; Transliteration: "Ashuraman no Yuujou no Maki" (Japanese: アシュラマンの友情 の巻)	November 17, 1985
115	"The Machineguns are Back!"; Transliteration: "Fukkatsu! Za Mashinganzu no Maki" (Japanese: 復活!ザ・マシンガンズ の巻)	November 24, 1985
115	"Mask The End"; Transliteration: "Masuku zi Endo no Maki" (Japanese: マスク・ジ・エンド の巻)	November 24, 1985
116	"Look! Kinnikuman's Real Face"; Transliteration: "Mita! Kinnikuman no Sugao no Maki" (Japanese: 見た!キン肉マンの素顔 の巻)	December 1, 1985
116	"Neptune King Appears"; Transliteration: "Nepuchyuun Kingu Shutsugen no Maki" (Japanese: ネプチューンキング出現 の巻)	December 1, 1985
117	"Terryman is Skewered!"; Transliteration: "Kushizashi! Teriiman no Maki" (Japanese: くし刺し!テリーマン の巻)	December 8, 1985
117	"The Friendship Power Comes like a Miracle"; Transliteration: "Kiseki wo Yobu Yuujou Pawaa no Maki" (Japanese: 奇跡を呼ぶ友情パワー の巻)	December 8, 1985
118	"Burning Uneven Parallel Bars"; Transliteration: "Kajiba no Danchigai Heikoubu no Maki" (Japanese: 火事場の段違い平行棒 の巻)	December 15, 1985
118	"The Mystery of the Apollo Window"; Transliteration: "Aporon Uindou no Nazo no Maki" (Japanese: アポロンウィンドウの謎 の巻)	December 15, 1985
119	"Lock the Key-Shaped Ancient Graveyard"; Transliteration: "Zenpoukou Enbun ni Kagi wo Kakero no Maki" (Japanese: 前方後円墳に鍵をかけろ の巻)	December 22, 1985
119	"The Shining Trophy!"; Transliteration: "Hikari Kagayuki Torofi! No Maki" (Japanese: 光り輝くトロフィー! の巻)	December 22, 1985
120	"The Prince Kinniku Maru Appears"; Transliteration: "Purinsu Kinniku Maru - Tenpuku no Maki" (Japanese: プリンスキン肉丸・転覆 の卷)	January 5, 1986
120	"The Ultimate Choujin Army Appears"; Transliteration: "Za Saikoo Choujin Gunden Shutsugen no Maki" (Japanese: ザ・サイコー超人軍団出現 の卷)	January 5, 1986
121	Transliteration: "Gunshi Yama Kaan Toujou no Maki" (Japanese: 軍師ヤマカーン登場 の卷)	January 12, 1986
121	"Transforming Choujin Kareiyasu"; Transliteration: "Henshin Choujin Kareiyasu no Maki" (Japanese: 変身超人カレイヤス の卷)	January 12, 1986
122	"Kinnikuman Melts"; Transliteration: "Youka Sareta Kinnikuman no Maki" (Japanese: 溶かされたキン肉マン の卷)	January 19, 1986
122	"A Great Melee! Where is Mari?"; Transliteration: "Dairansen! Mari wa Dokoni? No Maki" (Japanese: 大乱戦!マリはどこに? の卷)	January 19, 1986
123	"It's Here! The Ultimate Jaws"; Transliteration: "Deta! Saikoo Joozu no Maki" (Japanese: 出た!サイコージョーズ の卷)	January 26, 1986
123	"Yama Khan's One-on-One Fight"; Transliteration: "Yama Kaan to no Ikkiuchi no Maki" (Japanese: ヤマカーンとの一騎打ち の卷)	January 26, 1986
124	"The Strongest Ultimate Warp"; Transliteration: "Saikyou! Saikoo Wapu no Maki" (Japanese: 最強!サイコーワープ の卷)	February 2, 1986
124	"The Justice Choujin are Forever!"; Transliteration: "Seigi Choujin yo - Eien Nare! No Maki" (Japanese: 正義超人よ・永遠なれ! の卷)	February 2, 1986
125	"The 2 Kinnikumans!?"; Transliteration: "2 Nin no Kinnikuman!? No Maki" (Japanese: 2人のキン肉マン あれっ!?の卷)	April 22, 1986
125	"Protect the Sword of Justice!"; Transliteration: "Mamore! Seigi no Ken no Maki" (Japanese: 守れ!正義の剣(つるぎ) の卷)	April 22, 1986
126	"The Casket Bearer, Dirty Baron"; Transliteration: "Kanoke Haitatsunin Daati Baron no Maki" (Japanese: 棺桶配達人ダーティバロン の卷)	April 29, 1986
126	"The Sparking Hellish Ring"; Transliteration: "Hibana Chiru Jigoku no Ringu no Maki" (Japanese: 火花散る地獄のリング の卷)	April 29, 1986
127	"The Dormant Volcano Erupts!?"; Transliteration: "Kyuukazan Dai Bakuhatsu!? No Maki" (Japanese: 休火山大爆発!? の卷)	May 20, 1986
127	"Wild Bakuto in the Night Fog"; Transliteration: "Yogiri no Wairudo Bakuto no Maki" (Japanese: 夜霧のワイルドバクト の卷)	May 20, 1986
128	"The Heinous Bakuto Trump!!"; Transliteration: "Gokuaku!! Bakuto Toranpu no Maki" (Japanese: 極悪!!バクトトランプ の卷)	May 27, 1986
128	"Dirty Baron is Alive"; Transliteration: "Iki Dei ta Daati Baron no Maki" (Japanese: 生きていたダーティバロン の卷)	May 27, 1986
129	"The Dreaded 3-D Trump"; Transliteration: "Kyōfu no Sanjigen Toranpu no Maki" (Japanese: 恐怖の三次元トランプ の卷)	June 17, 1986
129	"Terryman is Tattered!"; Transliteration: "Zutaboro! Teriiman no Maki" (Japanese: ズタボロ!テリーマン の卷)	June 17, 1986
130	"Crash! The New Long Horns"; Transliteration: "Shuugeki! Nyuu Rongu Hoon no Maki" (Japanese: 衝撃!ニューロングホーン の卷)	July 1, 1986
130	"Buffaloman Becomes a Demon"; Transliteration: "Akuma ni Natta Baffarooman no Maki" (Japanese: 悪魔になったバッファローマン の卷)	July 1, 1986
131	"Ramenman's Determination"; Transliteration: "Ramenman no Ketsui no Maki" (Japanese: ラーメンマンの決意 の卷)	July 15, 1986
131	"Finishing Move: The Great Guangzhou Waterwheel"; Transliteration: "Hissatsu Waza - Koushuu Dai Suisha no Maki" (Japanese: 必殺技・広州大水車 の卷)	July 15, 1986
132	"Ramenman is Skewered!"; Transliteration: "Kushizashi! Ramenman no Maki" (Japanese: 串刺し!ラーメンマン の卷)	July 22, 1986
132	"Sichuan: The Great Rising Dragon!"; Transliteration: "Shisen - Dai Shouryuu! No Maki" (Japanese: 四川・大昇竜! の卷)	July 22, 1986
133	"This is a Disadvantage! The Irregular Tag Match"; Transliteration: "Furi Daa! Hensoku Taggu Matchi no Maki" (Japanese: 不利だっ!変則タッグマッチ の卷)	July 29, 1986
133	"The Great Kaiju Sky Devil"; Transliteration: "Sukai Debiru no Dai Kaijuu no Maki" (Japanese: スカイデビルの大怪獣 の卷)	July 29, 1986
134	"Robin Mask's Desperate Situation"; Transliteration: "Zettaizetsumei! Robin Masuku no Maki" (Japanese: 絶体絶命!ロビンマスク の卷)	September 2, 1986
134	"The Thousand-Man Bite of Bull Docky"; Transliteration: "Sanningami Koroshi no Buru Dokkii no Maki" (Japanese: 千人咬み殺しのブルドッキー の卷)	September 2, 1986
135	"Brocken Jr. Gets Angry!"; Transliteration: "Ikare! Burokken Jr no Maki" (Japanese: 怒れ!ブロッケンJr の卷)	September 16, 1986
135	"A Threat! The Seven Tools of the Grim Reaper"; Transliteration: "Kyoui! Shinigami no Nanatsu Dougu no Maki" (Japanese: 脅威!死神の七つ道具 の卷)	September 16, 1986
136	"Watch It! The Biggest Match of the Century"; Transliteration: "Miyo! Seiki no Ichidai Kessen no Maki" (Japanese: 見よ!世紀の一大決戦 の卷)	September 23, 1986
136	"Burning Inner Strength"; Transliteration: "Kajiba no Kuso Chikara no Maki" (Japanese: 火事場のクソ力+α の卷)	September 23, 1986
137	"The Long Horns Barrage!"; Transliteration: "Rongu Hoon Midare Uchi! No Maki" (Japanese: ロングホーン乱れ打ち! の卷)	October 1, 1986
137	"Whose Hands will Wield the Sword of Justice!?"; Transliteration: "Seigi no Ken wa Dare no Teni!? No Maki" (Japanese: 正義の剣はだれの手に!? の卷)	October 1, 1986

== Kinnikuman: Scramble for the Throne ==
=== Season 4 ===
No.	Title	Original release date
138	"Disastor of the Planet Kinniku Throne Coronation!!"; Transliteration: "Kinniku-sei Oui Taikanshiki no Ihen!! no maki" (Japanese: キン肉星王位戴冠式の異変!! の巻)	October 6, 1991
139	"Pick the Castle Battle Sites! The Plot of the Evil Gods!!"; Transliteration: "Shiro Tori Kassen! Ja'aku na Kami no Inbou!! no maki" (Japanese: 城取り合戦! 邪悪な神の陰謀!! の巻)	October 13, 1991
140	"The Gong Rings! The 5-on-2 Showdown"; Transliteration: "Gongu wa Natta! Kessen Go tai Ni no maki" (Japanese: ゴングは鳴った! 決戦5対2の巻)	October 20, 1991
141	"The Dreadful Choujin Hawkman!"; Transliteration: "Osorubeshi! Choujin Hōkuman no maki" (Japanese: 恐るべし! 超人ホークマンの巻)	October 27, 1991
142	"Danger! Burning Inner Strength"; Transliteration: "Aya'ushi! Kajiba no Kuso Djikara" (Japanese: 危うし! 火事場のクソ力の巻)	November 10, 1991
143	"It's a Miracle! Escape from the Choujin Graveyard"; Transliteration: "Kiseki! Choujin Hakaba kara no Dasshuu no maki" (Japanese: 奇跡! 超人墓場からの脱出の巻)	November 17, 1991
144	"Meat's Great Struggle! Catch that Victory"; Transliteration: "Miito Dai Fuusen! Tsukame Shouri wo no maki" (Japanese: ミート大奮戦! つかめ勝利をの巻)	November 24, 1991
145	"Is it in Time? Friendship Power at Full Throttle"; Transliteration: "Mani'au ka? Yuujou Pawā Zenkai no maki" (Japanese: 間に合うか? 友情パワー全開の巻)	December 1, 1991
146	"The Dream is Alive! The Muscle Friendship Union"; Transliteration: "Yume yo Todoke! Massuru Yuuhou Doumei no maki" (Japanese: 夢よ届け! マッスル友情同盟の巻)	December 8, 1991
147	"The Mysterious Light!? Burning Texas Spirit"; Transliteration: "Shinpi na Hikari!? Moeru Tekisasu Tamashii no maki" (Japanese: 神秘な光!? 燃えるテキサス魂の巻)	December 15, 1991
148	"The Deadly Muscle Revenger!"; Transliteration: "Hissatsu! Massuru Ribenjā no maki" (Japanese: 必殺! マッスルリベンジャーの巻)	December 22, 1991
149	"Stand up, Robin! A Cry from the Past"; Transliteration: "Tate Robin! Kako kara no Sakebi no maki" (Japanese: たてロビン! 過去からの叫びの巻)	January 12, 1992
150	"Dye the White Cape in Scarlet"; Transliteration: "Shinku ni Somaru Junpaku no Manto no maki" (Japanese: 真紅に染まる純白のマントの巻)	January 19, 1992
151	"The Unexpected Rival!? The Choujin Blood Brigade Appears"; Transliteration: "Igai na Kataki!? Choujin Chimeigun Toujou no maki" (Japanese: 意外な敵!? 超人血盟軍登場の巻)	January 26, 1992
152	"Saving a Friend! Warsman Returns"; Transliteration: "Tomo wo Sukue! Wōzuman Fukkatsu no maki" (Japanese: 友を救え! ウォーズマン復活の巻)	February 2, 1992
153	"Ah! A Rain of Blood Splatters on the Ring"; Transliteration: "Aa! Ringu ni Tobichiru Chi no Arashi no maki" (Japanese: 嗚呼! リングに飛び散る血の嵐の巻)	February 16, 1992
154	"Live or Die!? The Two Friendship Powers"; Transliteration: "I ka Shi ka!? Futatsu no Yuujou Pawā no maki" (Japanese: 生か死か!? 二つの友情パワーの巻)	February 23, 1992
155	"Foe or Friend!? The Two Bikemans"; Transliteration: "Kataki ka Mikata ka!? Futari no Baikuman no maki" (Japanese: 敵か味方か!? 2人のバイクマンの巻)	March 1, 1992
156	"Alive Again! Ramenman Lives!!"; Transliteration: "Inochi Futatabi! Ikiro Rāmenman!! no maki" (Japanese: 命再び! 生きろラーメンマン!! の巻)	March 8, 1992
157	"The Dreadful Prophecy!? March, 1992..."; Transliteration: "Osorubeki Yogen!? Sen-Kyuuhyaku-Kyuujuuni-nen Sangatsu... no maki" (Japanese: 恐るべき予言!? 1992年3月...の巻)	March 15, 1992
158	"Just Like the Prophecy Said! The Deadly Battle Road"; Transliteration: "Yogen Tekichuu! Shi no Nettou Rōdo no maki" (Japanese: 予言的中! 死の熱闘ロードの巻)	March 22, 1992
159	"The Evil Angel!? Split Personality Zebra"; Transliteration: "Akuma Tenshi!? Nijuu-Jinkaku Zebura no maki" (Japanese: 悪魔天使!? 二重人格ゼブラの巻)	March 29, 1992
160	"Great Explosion!! Burning Friendship Power"; Transliteration: "Dai Bakuhatsu!! Kajiba no Yuujou Pawā no maki" (Japanese: 大爆発!! 火事場の友情パワーの巻)	April 5, 1992
161	"Until the Bone Melts! The Capillaria Ray"; Transliteration: "Hone made Tokero! Kapiraria Kousen no maki" (Japanese: 骨まで溶けろ! カピラリア光線の巻)	April 12, 1992
162	"Farewell! Brocken Burns Out"; Transliteration: "Saraba! Moetsukita Burokken no maki" (Japanese: さらば! 燃え尽きたブロッケンの巻)	April 19, 1992
163	"Can You See It!? This is True Friendship Power!!"; Transliteration: "Mita ka!? Kore ga Shin Yuujou Pawā da!! no maki" (Japanese: 見たか!? これが真·友情パワーだ!! の巻)	April 26, 1992
164	"That One's Life is Important! This is Friendship!!"; Transliteration: "Inochi yori Taisetsu na mono! Sore ga Yuujou da!! no maki" (Japanese: 命より大切なもの! それが友情だ!! の巻)	May 3, 1992
165	"The Prophecy Page Burns! Soldier Disappears!!"; Transliteration: "Moeru Yogensho! Kieru Sorujā!! no maki" (Japanese: 燃える予言書! 消えるソルジャー!! の巻)	May 10, 1992
166	"Little Brother! This is the Muscle Spark!!"; Transliteration: "Ototo yo! Kore ga Massuru Supāku da!! no maki" (Japanese: 弟よ! これがマッスル·スパークだ!! の巻)	May 17, 1992
167	"The Deadly Special Training! Hurry to the Showdown at Osaka Castle!!"; Transliteration: "Shi no Tokkun! Isoge Ohsaka-jou Kessen!! no maki" (Japanese: 死の特訓! 急げ大阪城決戦!! の巻)	May 24, 1992
168	"Choujin Spirit! Never Give Up!!"; Transliteration: "Choujin Tamashii! Nebā Gibu Appu!! no maki" (Japanese: 超人魂! ネバー·ギブアップ!! の巻)	May 31, 1992
169	"Wisdom and Courage! The Magic Ring Death Match"; Transliteration: "Chie to Yuuki! Mahoujin Desumatchi no maki" (Japanese: 知恵と勇気! 魔法陣デスマッチの巻)	June 7, 1992
170	"Is That It!? The Complete Muscle Spark"; Transliteration: "Deru ka!? Kanpeki Massuru Spāku no maki" (Japanese: 出るか!? 完璧マッスルスパークの巻)	June 14, 1992
171	"The Legendary Blood! The Two Plots that Scream Death"; Transliteration: "Chi no Densetsu! Shi wo Yobu Futatsu no Inbou no maki" (Japanese: 血の伝説! 死を呼ぶ二つの陰謀の巻)	June 21, 1992
172	"Four Thousand Chinese Years! Pyramid Power"; Transliteration: "Chuugoku Yosen-nen! Piramiddo Pawā no maki" (Japanese: 中国四千年! ピラミッドパワーの巻)	June 28, 1992
173	"The Choujin Hunter Omegaman Appears!"; Transliteration: "Choujin Hantā! Omegaman Arawaru no maki" (Japanese: 超人ハンター! オメガマン現わるの巻)	July 5, 1992
174	"Find it! The Proof of the Fake Prince!!"; Transliteration: "Sagase! Nise Ouji no Shouko!! no maki" (Japanese: 探せ! 偽王子の証拠!! の巻)	July 12, 1992
175	"An Ally!? We Meet Samurai"; Transliteration: "Mikata ka!? Samurai Kenzan no maki" (Japanese: 味方か!? サムライ見参の巻)	July 19, 1992
176	"Farewell, Noble Robin!"; Transliteration: "Saraba! Kikoushi Robin no maki" (Japanese: さらば! 貴公子ロビンの巻)	July 26, 1992
177	"Can You See It!? The Hellish Metemorphisis Choujin"; Transliteration: "Mitaka! Jigoku Henshin Choujin no maki" (Japanese: 見たか! 地獄変身超人の巻)	August 9, 1992
178	"Showdown With Master Kamehame"; Transliteration: "Onshi Kamehame tono Taiketsu no maki" (Japanese: 恩師カメハメとの対決の巻)	August 16, 1992
179	"Bibinba's Confession of Love!?"; Transliteration: "Bibinba, Ai no Kokuhaku!? no maki" (Japanese: ビビンバ、愛の告白!? の巻)	August 23, 1992
180	"Message of Love and Death!"; Transliteration: "Ai to Shi no Messēji! no maki" (Japanese: 愛と死のメッセージ! の巻)	September 6, 1992
181	"The Final Battle! Evil or Justice?"; Transliteration: "Saishuu-sen! Ja'aku ka Seigi ka no maki" (Japanese: 最終戦! 邪悪か正義かの巻)	September 13, 1992
182	"Never Give Up!!"; Transliteration: "Nebā Gibu Appu!! no maki" (Japanese: ネバー·ギブアップ!! の巻)	September 20, 1992
183	"Kinnikuman is Forever!!"; Transliteration: "Kinnikuman yo Eien ni!! no maki" (Japanese: キン肉マンよ永遠に!! の巻)	September 27, 1992

== Kinnikuman Perfect Origin Arc ==
=== Season 5 ===
No.	Title	Original release date
-	"Kinnikuman forever... and" Transliteration: "Kin'nikuman yo Towa ni…… Soshite" (Japanese: キン肉マンよ永遠に……そして)	July 7, 2024
184	"The Dawn of a New History!!"; Transliteration: "Aratana Rekishi no Makuake!!" (Japanese: 新たな歴史の幕開け!!)	July 14, 2024
185	"A Terrifying Hell!!"; Transliteration: "Kyōfu no Kanretsu Jigoku!!" (Japanese: 恐怖の完裂地獄!!)	July 21, 2024
186	"The Determined Texas Bronco!!"; Transliteration: "Shūnen no Tekisasu Buronko!!" (Japanese: 執念のテキサス・ブロンコ!!)	July 28, 2024
187	"Attack! Devil Choujins Army!!"; Transliteration: "Kyōshū! Akuma Chōjin-gun!!" (Japanese: 強襲！悪魔超人軍!!)	August 4, 2024
188	"The Pride of the Devil Choujin!!"; Transliteration: "Akuma Chōjin no Hokori!!" (Japanese: 悪魔超人の誇り!!)	August 11, 2024
189	"The Fourth Dimension of Strategy!!"; Transliteration: "Sakuryaku no Yojigenkūkan!!" (Japanese: 策略の四次元空間!!)	August 18, 2024
190	"Collision! Choujin Ideologies!!"; Transliteration: "Shōtotsu! Chōjin-tachi no Ideorogī!!" (Japanese: 衝突！超人たちのイデオロギー!!)	August 25, 2024
191	"The First and Last Favorite Special Move!!"; Transliteration: "Saisho de Saigo no Feibaritto!!" (Japanese: 最初で最後の必殺技!!)	September 1, 2024
192	"The Heart That Could not Learn!!"; Transliteration: "Manabenakatta Kokoro!!" (Japanese: 学べなかった心!!)	September 8, 2024
193	"The Mountain! Devil's Will!!"; Transliteration: "Maunten! Akuma no Iji!!" (Japanese: 魔雲天！悪魔の意地!!)	September 15, 2024
194	"The New Large Numbers!!"; Transliteration: "Aratanaru Rāji Nanbāzu!!" (Japanese: 新たなる無量大数軍!!)	September 22, 2024

=== Season 6 ===
No.	Title	Original release date
195	"A Three-way Showdown! The Deadly Battle Begins at the Pyramid Staircase!!"; Transliteration: "Mitsudomoe Kessen! Shitō Kaimaku Kaidan Piramiddo!!" (Japanese: 三つ巴決戦！死闘開幕階段ピラミッド!!)	January 12, 2025
196	"The Soul of the Brocken Family!!"; Transliteration: "Burokken Ichizoku no Tamashī!!" (Japanese: ブロッケン一族の魂!!)	January 19, 2025
197	"Belief of the Noble Kung Fu Expert!"; Transliteration: "Kōketsunaru Kenpō-ka no Shin'nen!!" (Japanese: 高潔なる拳法家の信念!!)	January 26, 2025
198	"The Voice from the 4th Dimension"; Transliteration: "Yojigen Kara no Koe!!" (Japanese: 四次元からの声!!)	February 2, 2025
199	"Return of the Strongest Akuma Tag Team!"; Transliteration: "Akuma Saikyō Taggu Futatabi!!" (Japanese: 悪魔最強タッグ再び!!)	February 9, 2025
200	"Observe, Comrades! A Revenge to Bet Your Life On!"; Transliteration: "Mita ka Dōshi-tachi! Inochi o Toshita Katakiuchi!!" (Japanese: 見たか同志たち！命を賭した敵討ち!!)	February 16, 2025
201	"The Chojin Genesis!"; Transliteration: "Chōjin Sōsei-ki!!" (Japanese: 超人創世記!!)	February 23, 2025
202	"The Unsinkable Steel Ship!"; Transliteration: "Kōtetsu no Fuchin-kan!!" (Japanese: 鋼鉄の不沈艦!!)	March 2, 2025
203	"Keeping the Master's Teachings in Heart!!"; Transliteration: "Shi no Oshie o Mune ni!!" (Japanese: 師の教えを胸に!!)	March 16, 2025
204	"Warsman Reboots!!"; Transliteration: "Uōzuman Ribūto!!" (Japanese: ウォーズマン・リブート!)	March 23, 2025
205	"Fighting to Live!"; Transliteration: "Ikiru Tame no Tatakai!!" (Japanese: 生きるための闘い!!)	March 30, 2025
