= 1984 in animation =

Events in 1984 in animation.

== Events ==
=== March ===
- March 10: The first episode of James the Cat is broadcast.
- March 11: Hayao Miyazaki's Nausicaä of the Valley of the Wind is first released.

=== April ===
- April 9: 56th Academy Awards: Sundae in New York by Jimmy Picker receives the Academy Award for Best Animated Short Film.
- April 16: The Peanuts TV special It's Flashbeagle, Charlie Brown premieres on CBS.

=== June ===
- June 22: The animation studio Studio APPP is founded.
- June 27: The first of a series of TV specials about Rainbow Brite is broadcast a television series will debut next year.

=== August ===
- August 30: József Gémes' Heroic Times premieres.

=== September ===
- September 5: The first episode of Heathcliff is broadcast.
- September 8:
  - The first episode of Challenge of the GoBots is broadcast.
  - The first episode of Dragon's Lair is broadcast.
- September 10: The first episode of Voltron is broadcast. The Western version to Beast King GoLion and Armored Fleet Dairugger XV gained popularity in the United States as it will eventually be rebooted in the 21st century.
- September 14: Ruby-Spears Enterprises' Rose Petal Place is broadcast. It was attended to be the successor to Strawberry Shortcake, but was discontinued the following year as it was not well-marketed like its ongoing predecessor.
- September 15:
  - The first episode of Muppet Babies is broadcast.
  - The first episode of My Little Pony is broadcast.
  - The first episode of Snorks is broadcast.
- September 17: The first episode of The Transformers is broadcast.

=== October ===
- October 9: The first episode of Thomas and Friends is broadcast, based on the children's book series The Railway Series.
- October 12: The Danish film Samson & Sally by Jannik Hastrup premieres.
- October 26: The animation studio Film Roman is founded, and its first project Garfield in the Rough premieres on CBS.

=== November ===
- November 28: Gallavants is first released.

=== December ===
- December 5: Disney Television Animation is founded.
- December 24: The animation studio Gainax is founded.

=== Specific date unknown ===
- Lev Milchin and Ivan Ivanov-Vano's The Tale of Tsar Saltan premieres.
- Jef Cassiers' John the Fearless (Jan Zonder Vrees) premieres, the first Flemish animated feature film.
- In Germany, the Max und Moritz Award for young comic artists is first awarded.

== Films released ==
- January 1 - The Tale of Tsar Saltan (Soviet Union)
- January 19 - The Adventures of Sam the Squirrel (Hungary)
- January 20 - Phoenix-bot Phoenix King (South Korea)
- February 1:
  - Adventures of the Blue Knight (Poland)
  - The Secret of the Selenites (France)
- February 11:
  - The Star of Cottonland (Japan)
  - Urusei Yatsura 2: Beautiful Dreamer (Japan)
- March 4 - Boukenshatachi: Gamba to 7-biki no Naka Ma (Japan)
- March 7 - L'Enfant invisible (France)
- March 10 - Kenya Boy (Japan)
- March 11:
  - Future Boy Conan: The Revival of the Giant Machine (Japan)
  - Meitantei Holmes: Aoi Ruby no Maki / Kaitei no Zaihō no Maki (Japan)
  - Nausicaä of the Valley of the Wind (Japan)
- March 17:
  - Doraemon: Nobita's Great Adventure into the Underworld (Japan)
  - Ninja Hattori-kun + Perman: ESP Wars (Japan)
  - Oshin (Japan)
- March 20 - Chiisana Koi no Monogatari: Chichi to Sally Hatsukoi no Shiki (Japan)
- April 7 - Kinnikuman: Showdown! The 7 Justice Supermen vs. The Space Samurais (Japan)
- April 14 - Locke the Superman (Japan)
- April 21 - Pro Yakyū o 10-bai Tanoshiku Miru Hōhō Part 2 (Japan)
- April 28 - The King of Inventions (South Korea)
- May 8 - The Camel Boy (Australia)
- June 8 - The Adventures of Pinocchio (United States)
- July 5:
  - Katy (Mexico)
  - Snow White (Hungary)
- July 8:
  - Papa Mama Bye bye (Japan)
  - Return of the Dinosaurs (Japan)
- July 10 - John the Fearless (Belgium)
- July 14 - Kinnikuman: Stolen Championship Belt (Japan)
- July 15 - Dokgo-Tak 2 – My Name is Dokgo-Tak (South Korea)
- July 21 - Macross: Do You Remember Love? (Japan)
- August 4:
  - 84 Taekwon V (South Korea)
  - Earth Story Telepath 2500 (Japan)
- August 12 - Kuroi Ame ni Utarete (Japan)
- August 19 - Bagi, the Monster of Mighty Nature (Japan)
- August 21 - Birth (Japan)
- August 30 - Heroic Times (Hungary)
- September 5 - Nine: Final (Japan)
- September 22 - Kakkun Cafe (Japan)
- October 12 - Samson & Sally (Denmark)
- October 28 - Creamy Mami, the Magic Angel: Forever Once More (Japan)
- November 29 - The Soldier's Tale (United States)
- December 22:
  - Dr. Slump and Arale-chan: Hoyoyo! The Treasure of Nanaba Castle (Japan)
  - Kinnikuman: Great Riot! Justice Superman (Japan)
  - Video Ranger 007 (Japan)
- Specific date unknown:
  - Delta Space Mission (Romania)
  - Gallavants (United States)
  - Malá čarodějnice (Czechoslovakia and West Germany)
  - Manga Doushite Monogatari (Japan)
  - The Phantom Treehouse (Australia)
  - TimeFighters (Japan)
  - TimeFighters in the Land of Fantasy (Japan)
  - Xiyue qi tong (China)

== Television series debuts ==
- January - The Trap Door debuts on ITV (Children's ITV).
- January 7 - Okawari Boy Starzan S debuts on Fuji TV.
- January 8 - Katri, Girl of the Meadows debuts on Fuji TV.
- February 3 - Chō Kōsoku Galvion debuts on TV Asahi.
- February 4 - Heavy Metal L-Gaim debuts on Nagoya Broadcasting Network.
- February 6 - Little El Cid No Bôken debuts on TV Tokyo.
- February 7:
  - Soya Monogatari debuts in syndication.
  - Yume Senshi Wingman debuts on TV Asahi.
- March 3:
  - Lupin III Part III debuts on ytv, NNS.
  - Tongari Boushi no Memoru debuts on TV Asahi.
- March 4 - Video Warrior Laserion debuts on TBS.
- March 10 - James the Cat debuts on ITV Network (Children's ITV) (original series) and Channel 5 (Milkshake!) (1998 series).
- March 18 - Gu-Gu Gunmo debuts on Fuji TV.
- April 3 - Oyoneko Bunichan debuts on TV Asahi.
- April 5:
  - Giant Gorg debuts on TV Tokyo.
  - Rampoo debuts in syndication.
- April 9:
  - Chicken Takkun debuts on Fuji Television.
  - Glass Mask debuts on Nippon TV.
- April 13 - Attacker You! debuts on TV Tokyo.
- April 14 - My Little Pony 'n Friends debuts in syndication.
- April 15:
  - God Mazinger debuts on Nippon TV.
  - Super Dimension Cavalry Southern Cross debuts on JNN (MBS TV, Tokyo Broadcasting System Television).
- April 27 - The Wind in the Willows debuts on ITV Network.
- May 6 - The Get Along Gang debuts on CBS.
- June 27 - Rainbow Brite (1984 TV series) debuts in syndication.
- July 6 - Persia, the Magic Fairy debuts on Nippon Television (and other NNS stations).
- July 7 - Noozles debuts on Fuji TV.
- September - Karınca Ailesi ve Orman debutes on TRT 1.
- September 1 - Yoroshiku Mechadoc debuts on Fuji TV.
- September 3 - Heathcliff debuts in syndication.
- September 8:
  - Challenge of the GoBots debuts in syndication.
  - Dragon's Lair, Mighty Orbots, Wolf Rock TV, and Super Friends: The Legendary Super Powers Show debut on ABC.
  - Kidd Video debuts on NBC.
  - Pink Panther and Sons debuts on NBC and ABC.
- September 10 - Voltron debuts on ABC and NBC.
- September 11 - Towser debuts on ITV.
- September 15:
  - Muppet Babies and Pole Position debut on CBS.
  - Snorks debuts on NBC and in syndication.
  - Turbo Teen debuts on ABC.
- September 17 - The Transformers debuts in syndication.
- October 4 - Adventures of the Little Koala debuts on TV Tokyo.
- October 5:
  - Choriki Robo Galatt debuts on Nagoya Broadcasting Network.
  - Elves of the Forest debuts on Fuji TV.
  - Panzer World Galient debuts on Nippon Television.
  - The Family-Ness debuts on BBC One.
- October 6:
  - Ashita Tenki Ni Nare! debuts on Fuji TV.
  - Galactic Patrol: Lensman debuts on ANN (ABC).
- October 7 - Star Musketeer Bismarck debuts on NNS (NTV).
- October 9 - Thomas & Friends debuts on ITV (Series 1–3 and 7), Direct-to-video (Series 4–5), Nick Jr. (Series 6 and 8–11) & Channel 5 (Series 12–24).
- October 11 - Fist of the North Star debuts on Fuji TV.
- October 15 - Lucky Luke debuts on FR3 (France) and in syndication (United States).
- October 20 - Scary Scooby Funnies debuts on ABC.
- November 6 - Sherlock Hound debuts on TV Asahi (Japan) and Rai 1 (Italy).
- Specific date unknown:
  - Dotonabe No Manner debuts on Fuji TV.
  - Futari No Tama debuts in syndication.

== Births ==
=== January ===
- January 2: Jessica Gao, American television producer and writer (Nickelodeon Animation Studio, Robot Chicken, The High Fructose Adventures of Annoying Orange, Zip Zip, Rick and Morty).
- January 6: Kate McKinnon, American actress and comedian (voice of Fiona Frizzle in The Magic School Bus Rides Again, Squeeks in Nature Cat, Nikki and Margaret Fictel in The Venture Bros., Lulu in DC League of Super-Pets, Lupe in Ferdinand, Stella and Eva in The Angry Birds Movie, Régine Le Haut in Leap!).
- January 12: Sam Richardson, American actor, comedian, writer, and producer (voice of Lee the Office Nerd in Ralph Breaks the Internet, Muninn in Rise of the Teenage Mutant Ninja Turtles, Bort the Garj in Archer, Dr. Champ in BoJack Horseman, Vendome in Star Trek: Lower Decks, Marcus in Hoops, Garfield "Gary" Garoldson in M.O.D.O.K., Chico in HouseBroken, Swamp Thing in Harley Quinn, Shaggy Rogers in Velma).
- January 15: Natasia Demetriou, English actress (voice of Wingnut in Teenage Mutant Ninja Turtles: Mutant Mayhem, Cala Maria in The Cuphead Show!, Svetlana in the Teenage Euthanasia episode "Suddenly Susan").
- January 19: Nathan Ruegger, American former voice actor and son of Tom Ruegger (voice of Skippy Squirrel in Animaniacs, Froggo in Histeria!, Little Plucky in Tiny Toon Adventures).
- January 20: Saverio Raimondo, Italian comedian, television host, radio host, television author and humorist (voice of Ercole Visconti in Luca).
- January 25: Kaiji Tang, Chinese actor (voice of Archer in Fate/stay night, Shiro Takamachi in Magical Girl Lyrical Nanoha, Vegeta in the Bang Zoom! Entertainment dub of Dragon Ball Super, Su-Han in Miraculous: Tales of Ladybug & Cat Noir).
- January 30: Kid Cudi, American musician and actor (voice of Clay in Trolls Band Together, Devon in The Cleveland Show episode "Brownsized").

=== February ===
- February 1:
  - Abbi Jacobson, American comedian, writer, actress, illustrator and producer (voice of Sneaky Patty in Pickle and Peanut, Emily in BoJack Horseman, Chicken in The Master, Nya in The Lego Ninjago Movie, Princess Bean in Disenchantment, Katie Mitchell in The Mitchells vs. the Machines, Megan in the Bob's Burgers episode "Three Girls and a Little Wharfy", Sister Sister in the Lucas Bros. Moving Co. episode "Sister Sister Sister").
  - Lee Thompson Young, American actor (voice of Jermaine in Xiaolin Showdown, Teen Bebe in The Proud Family episode "Twins to Tweens"), (d. 2013).
  - Cristina Milizia, American actress (voice of Carlitos in The Casagrandes, Charlene in Victor and Valentino, Poison Ivy and Jessica Cruz in the DC Super Hero Girls franchise, Teresa in the Barbie franchise).
- February 4: Matthew Moy, American actor (voice of Lars Barriga in Steven Universe, David of Spades in Alice's Wonderland Bakery).
- February 8: Cecily Strong, American actress and comedian (voice of various characters in The Awesomes, Megan Matheson in The Simpsons episode "Homer Is Where the Art Isn't", Petunia in the Nature Cat episode "Garden Impossible").
- February 28: Dean Fleischer Camp, American film director, producer, screenwriter and editor (Marcel the Shell With Shoes On, Lilo & Stitch).

=== March ===
- March 2: Ian Sinclair, American actor (voice of Brook in the Funimation dub of One Piece, Whis in Dragon Ball Super, Toraji Ishida in Bamboo Blade, Dallas Genoard in Baccano!, Douglas Rosenberg in El Cazador de la Bruja, Takeru Oyama in Maken-ki!, Juzo Sakakura in the Danganronpa franchise, the title characters in Toriko and Space Dandy).
- March 4: Sam Marin, American voice actor and animator (voice of Benson, Muscle Man and Pops in Regular Show).
- March 7: Brandon T. Jackson, American actor (voice of Corduroy Jackson in BoJack Horseman, Jason Foley and Blair in The Zeta Project).
- March 10: Olivia Wilde, American actress and filmmaker (voice of Quorra in Tron: Uprising, Lois Lane in DC League of Super-Pets).
- March 13: Noel Fisher, Canadian actor (voice of Toad in X-Men: Evolution, Klarion the Witch Boy in Justice League Action, Brainiac 5 in Justice League vs. the Fatal Five).
- March 20: Christy Carlson Romano, American actress and singer (voice of the title character in Kim Possible, Yuffie Kisaragi in Final Fantasy VII: Advent Children).
- March 28: Bill Switzer, American-Canadian actor (voice of Sai Argyle in the Gundam franchise, Cannonball in X-Men: Evolution, Eli Moon in Cardcaptor Sakura, Harvey Kinkle in Sabrina: The Animated Series, Presley Carnovan in Mummies Alive!).

=== April ===
- April 2: Ashley Peldon, American actress (voice of Darla Dimple in Cats Don't Dance, additional voices in The Little Mermaid, Ice Age: Collision Course, The Star, Trollhunters: Tales of Arcadia, 3Below: Tales of Arcadia, The Mitchells vs. the Machines, and What If...?).
- April 3: Chrissie Fit, American actress (voice of Amanda Lopez in Milo Murphy's Law, Princess Valentina in Elena of Avalor, Cora in Animaniacs).
- April 4: Carolina Gaitán, Colombian actress and singer (voice of Pepa Madrigal in Encanto).
- April 8:
  - Taran Noah Smith, American former actor (voice of Patrick Fitz / Rat Boy in the Batman Beyond episode "Rats").
  - Kirsten Storms, American actress (voice of Bonnie Rockwaller in Kim Possible).
- April 10: Mandy Moore, American singer, songwriter, and actress (voice of Rapunzel in the Tangled franchise, Sofia the First, Ralph Breaks the Internet and Once Upon a Studio, the title character in Sheriff Callie's Wild West, Nita in Brother Bear 2, Mara in Tron: Uprising, Cassandra Barren in High School USA!, Tabitha Vixx in The Simpsons episode "Marge and Homer Turn a Couple Play", Courtney in the Family Guy episode "No Giggity, No Doubt", herself in the Clone High episode "Snowflake Day: A Very Special Holiday Episode").
- April 15: David Lehner, American music composer (composed the theme song of The Life and Times of Juniper Lee with his brother Rob), (d. 2005).
- April 18: America Ferrera, American actress (voice of Astrid Hofferson in the How to Train Your Dragon franchise).
- April 25: Jillian Bell, American actress (voiced and portrayed Eleanor Fay Bloomingbottom in Godmothered, voice of Lex Lightning in SuperMansion, Melody in Gravity Falls, Violet Hart in Bless the Harts, Gluntz in Green Eggs and Ham, Captain Glenda Price in the Archer episode "Dining with the Zarglorp").
- April 26: Ryan O'Donohue, American actor (voice of young Kovu in The Lion King II: Simba's Pride, Randell Weems and Digger Dave in Recess, Matt McGinnis in Batman Beyond).
- April 27: Patrick Stump, American musician and member of Fall Out Boy (performed "Immortals" in Big Hero 6 and the theme of Spidey and His Amazing Friends, voice of Ruberiot in Star vs. the Forces of Evil, Josh in Dead End: Paranormal Park, himself in the Teen Titans Go! episode "The Day the Night Stopped Beginning to Shine and Became Dark Even Though it Was the Day").

=== May ===
- May 14:
  - Jessica Boone, American voice actress (voice of Sheele in Akame ga Kill!, Rei Miyamoto in Highschool of the Dead, Chiyo Mihama in Azumanga Daioh, Mary Godwin in Xenosaga: The Animation).
  - Olly Murs, English singer and songwriter (voice of Junior Agent #1 in Spies in Disguise, Spike in the 101 Dalmatian Street episode "A Summer to Remember").
- May 17:
  - Alejandro Edda, Mexican-American actor (voice of Cindel in DreamWorks Dragons: Rescue Riders, Pedro in Captain Fall).
  - Lena Waithe, American actress, producer, and screenwriter (voice of Officer Specter in Onward, Lena Foreman in Big Mouth, Adult Maya Leibowitz-Jenkins in The Proud Family: Louder and Prouder episode "When You Wish Upon a Roker").
- May 19: Mike Krol, American musician (Steven Universe).
- May 21: Sunkrish Bala, Indian-born American actor (voice of Cricket Fan and Guru in Family Guy, Orchestra Member in The Simpsons short "When Billie Met Lisa").
- May 23: Adam Wylie, American actor (voice of Jimmy Olsen in Superman: Doomsday, Peter Pan in Jake and the Never Land Pirates, Brainiac 5 and Colossal Boy in Legion of Super Heroes, Pierce Wheels and J.T. in the Ben 10 franchise, Ulraj in The Secret Saturdays, Tritannus in Winx Club, Kenny Stanton in the Batman Beyond episode "Payback").

=== June ===
- June 5: Simon Rich, American humorist, novelist and screenwriter (Inside Out, The Simpsons).
- June 13: Phillip Van Dyke, American former actor (voice of Arnold, Sandy, Boy with Bucket and Ludwig in Hey Arnold!, young Martin in The Secret of NIMH 2: Timmy to the Rescue, Ivan in Bartok the Magnificent, Joel in The New Batman Adventures episode "Legends of the Dark Knight").
- June 18:
  - Ian Jones-Quartey, American animator (Steven Universe, Adventure Time, The Venture Bros.), producer (creator of OK K.O.! Let's Be Heroes) and voice actor (voice of Radicles, Darrell, and Crinky Wrinkly in OK K.O.! Let's Be Heroes, Snowflake Obsidian in the Steven Universe Future episode "Guidance").
  - Christopher Ragland, American actor (voice of Percy in Thomas & Friends, Lance and Wilfried in My Knight and Me, additional voices in Hilda and Minions).
- June 19: Paul Dano, American actor (voice of Alexander in Where the Wild Things Are, Caspian Keyes in Pantheon).
- June 24: Lucien Dodge, American voice actor (voice of Zoisite in the Viz Media dub of Sailor Moon, Akaza in Demon Slayer: Kimetsu no Yaiba, Tom in Tree Fu Tom, Damian Wayne in Batman Unlimited: Mechs vs. Mutants).
- June 26: Aubrey Plaza, American actress, comedian, and producer (voice of Claire Wheeler in Monsters University, Eska in The Legend of Korra, Dylan Beekler in Golan the Insatiable, Laura in Little Demon, Nocturna in the SpongeBob SquarePants episode "Mall Girl Pearl", Nina in the Duncanville episode "Das Banana Boot").

=== July ===
- July 3: Miguel Puga, American animator, storyboard artist (Warner Bros. Animation, Nickelodeon Animation Studio, Pink Panther and Pals, Good Vibes, Napoleon Dynamite, Futurama, Clarence, Gravity Falls), writer, director and producer (The Loud House, The Casagrandes).
- July 7: Ross Malinger, American former actor (original voice of T.J. Detweiler in Recess).
- July 19:
  - Andrea Libman, Canadian actress (voice of Pinkie Pie and Fluttershy in My Little Pony: Friendship Is Magic, Lemon Meringue in Strawberry Shortcake's Berry Bitty Adventures, Emmy in Dragon Tales, Maya in Maya the Bee, the title character in Madeline, Chi Chi in Dragon Ball, X-23 in the X-Men: Evolution episode of the same name, young AndrAla in ReBoot).
  - Keenan Christensen, American actor (voice of Jimmy in Ed, Edd n Eddy, additional voices in RoboCop: Alpha Commando).
- July 30:
  - Gina Rodriguez, American actress (voice of the title character in Carmen Sandiego, Velma Dinkley in Scoob!, Una in Ferdinand, Gina Alverez in Big Mouth, Princess Marisa in Elena of Avalor, Kolka in Smallfoot, Catwoman in Batwheels).
  - Ryōhei Kimura, Japanese actor (voice of Hideki Hinata in Angel Beats!, Bokuto Koutarou in Haikyu!!, Lord Enma in Yo-Kai Watch, Ryouta Kise in Kuroko's Basketball, Japanese dub voice of Wade Load in Kim Possible and Colby in The Weekenders).

=== August ===
- August 12: Carl Faruolo, American animator, voice actor (voice of Papercut Peterson and Howie in Kick Buttowski: Suburban Daredevil, Grenda in Gravity Falls, various characters in Sanjay and Craig and Pig Goat Banana Cricket, Gebbrey in Centaurworld), animatic editor (The Life and Times of Juniper Lee), storyboard artist (Cartoon Network Studios, Disney Television Animation, Sanjay and Craig, Oddballs), writer (Chowder, Kick Buttowski: Suburban Daredevil, Fish Hooks, Sanjay and Craig, Oddballs), director (Brickleberry, Pig Goat Banana Cricket, Oddballs) and producer (Pig Goat Banana Cricket, Animaniacs, Oddballs).
- August 17: Raphael Bob-Waksberg, American comedian, writer, producer (Tuca & Bertie), actor and voice actor (creator of BoJack Horseman).
- August 28: Zehra Fazal, American actress (voice of General Yunan in Amphibia, Faraday in Craig of the Creek, Basemax in Big Hero 6: The Series, Zahra in Glitch Techs, Mara in She-Ra and the Princesses of Power, Celine Starburst in Trolls: The Beat Goes On!, Nadia Rizavi in Voltron: Legendary Defender, Livewire in My Adventures with Superman, various characters in Young Justice).
- August 31: Julia Vickerman, American animator (Yo Gabba Gabba!, The Drawn Together Movie: The Movie!, Good Vibes, The Lego Movie 2: The Second Part), storyboard artist (The Powerpuff Girls), writer (The Powerpuff Girls), director (Clarence) and producer (creator of Twelve Forever).

=== September ===
- September 1: Ludwig Göransson, Swedish composer, conductor and record producer (Trolls World Tour, Turning Red).
- September 23: Anneliese van der Pol, Dutch-American actress and singer (voice of Heather in the Kim Possible episode "And the Mole-Rat Will Be CGI").
- September 25: Zach Woods, American actor and comedian (voice of Zane in The Lego Ninjago Movie, Carl in The Angry Birds Movie 2, Zane Furlong in The Simpsons episode "The Miseducation of Lisa Simpson", Lauren Caspian in In the Know).

=== October ===
- October 1:
  - Beck Bennett, American actor, comedian and writer (voice of Launchpad McQuack in DuckTales, Lance in Sing, Brad Eagleberger and Hank in The Angry Birds Movie 2, Nikita Ionescu in Comrade Detective, Austin Van Der Sleet, Kobolt and José in M.O.D.O.K., Thomas in Saturday Morning All Star Hits!, Hamster in Hamster & Gretel, Father of Boy in the Axe Cop episode "The Rabbit Who Broke All the Rules", Repo Man in the Lucas Bros. Moving Co. episode "DDT", Brody in the We Bare Bears episode "Bro Brawl", Luc in the Close Enough episode "Houseguest from Hell", P3 in the Santa Inc. episode "Spring Awakening", Grayson Mathers in The Simpsons episode "The Longest Marge").
  - Josh Brener, American actor (voice of Donatello in Rise of the Teenage Mutant Ninja Turtles, Mark Beaks in DuckTales, Neeku Vozo in Star Wars Resistance, Dylan in 101 Dalmatian Street).
- October 2: John Morris, American actor (voice of Andy Davis in the Toy Story franchise).
- October 3: Chris Marquette, American actor (voice of Alex O'Connell in The Mummy, Jamie Townsend in Fillmore!).
- October 14: Jason Davis, American actor (voice of Mikey Blumberg in Recess), (d. 2020).
- October 24: Ben Giroux, American actor (voice of Nate Wright in Big Nate, Mikey Munroe in Bunsen Is a Beast, Damian Wayne in Batman vs. Teenage Mutant Ninja Turtles, Jimmy Olsen in the DC Super Hero Girls episode "#WorldsFinest").
- October 27: Kelly Osbourne, English television personality, singer, actress and fashion designer (voice of Hildy Gloom in The 7D).

=== November ===
- November 3: Marcus Toji, American actor (voice of Park in Hey Arnold!, Maroshi in Hanazuki: Full of Treasures, Wei in The Legend of Korra, Brian in Rainbow Brite, Vern Natoma in Fillmore!).
- November 9:
  - Kyle Rideout, Canadian actor (voice of Thorax in My Little Pony: Friendship Is Magic, Vinnie Terrio in Littlest Pet Shop, Terrance Buckshot in Packages from Planet X).
  - Elysia Rotaru, Canadian actress (voice of Black Canary in Justice Society: World War II, Sable Spirit in the My Little Pony: Friendship Is Magic episode "Campfire Tales").
- November 10: Britt Irvin, Canadian actress (voice of Katie in Scary Godmother: Halloween Spooktakular and Scary Godmother: The Revenge of Jimmy, Jade in season 2 of Bratz, Runa Tokisaka in The SoulTaker, Lightning Dust in My Little Pony: Friendship Is Magic, Sunny Flare in My Little Pony: Equestria Girls, Ursula in George of the Jungle, continued voice of X-23 in X-Men: Evolution).
- November 16: Kimberly J. Brown, American actress (voice of Female Ants in A Bug's Life, the title character in Vampire Princess Miyu, Lona in The Little Polar Bear, Blair in The Ghost and Molly McGee episode "The Unhaunting of Brighton Video").
- November 20: Jeremy Jordan, American actor and singer (voice of Varian in Rapunzel's Tangled Adventure, Lucifer Morningstar in Hazbin Hotel).
- November 22: Scarlett Johansson, American actress (voice of Ash in the Sing franchise, Nutmeg in Isle of Dogs, Mindy in The SpongeBob SquarePants Movie, Elita-1 in Transformers One).
- November 23: Lucas Grabeel, American actor and musician (voice of Deputy Peck in Sheriff Callie's Wild West, the title character in Pinky Malinky, Jiku in Elena of Avalor, Gustav in DreamWorks Dragons, Uncle Eric in the Special Agent Oso episode "On Old MacDonald's Special Song", Justin Bieber in the Robot Chicken episode "Robot Chicken's ATM Christmas Special").
- November 25: Gaspard Ulliel, French actor (dub voice of Jack Frost in Rise of the Guardians), (d. 2022).
- November 28: Mary Elizabeth Winstead, American actress (voice of Ramona Flowers in Scott Pilgrim Takes Off, Trix Blixon in the Danger & Eggs episode of the same name).

=== December ===
- December 6:
  - America Young, American actress (voice of Toralei Stripe and Howleen Wolf in the Monster High franchise, continued voice of Barbie in the Barbie franchise).
  - Kira Tozer, Canadian actress (voice of Kattrin in Barbie in a Mermaid Tale 2, Ella the Brachiosaurus in Dinosaur Train, Minka Mark in Littlest Pet Shop, Kagome Higurashi in Inuyasha: The Final Act, Fire Flare in the My Little Pony: Friendship Is Magic episode "The Summer Sun Setback").
- December 16: Theo James, English actor (voice of Vesemir in The Witcher: Nightmare of the Wolf, Hector in Castlevania, Rek'yr in The Dark Crystal: Age of Resistance, Bastion in X-Men '97).
- December 19: Stacie Chan, American actress and journalist (voice of Jade Chan in Jackie Chan Adventures, Alex in the What's New, Scooby-Doo? episode "Camp Comeoniwannascareya", Junior in the Fillmore! episode "Two Wheels, Full Throttle, No Brakes").
- December 25: Mike Rianda, American writer and director (The Mitchells vs. the Machines, Gravity Falls).
- December 30: LeBron James, American professional basketball player (portrayed himself in Space Jam: A New Legacy and the SpongeBob SquarePants episode "Truth or Square", voice of Business in The LeBrons, Gwangi in Smallfoot, and himself in The Simpsons episode "Homer and Ned's Hail Mary Pass", The Cleveland Show episode "A Short Story and a Tall Tale", and the Teen Titans Go! episode "The Cruel Giggling Ghoul").

=== Specific date unknown ===
- Austin Madison, American animator, artist, story artist, and voice actor (Pixar).

== Deaths ==
=== January ===
- January 2: David Detiege, American film director (The Man from Button Willow, Shinbone Alley), animation writer (Warner Bros. Cartoons), animator, producer, and director, dies at age 57.
- January 31: K-Hito, Spanish caricaturist, animator, sports journalist, film producer, publisher and comics writer and artist (Francisca, la mujer fatal, La Vampiresa Morros de Fresa), dies at age 93 or 94.

=== February ===
- February 15: Ethel Merman, American actress and singer (portrayed herself and sang in 3 Betty Boop cartoons, voice of Mombi in Journey Back to Oz, Lilly Loraine in Rudolph and Frosty's Christmas in July), dies at age 76.
- February 25: Bob Ogle, American actor (voice of the title character in The Kwicky Koala Show, Digger the Mole in Shirt Tales), animator and writer (Hanna-Barbera), dies at age 57.

=== March ===
- March 10: Eugene Poddany, Chinese-born American composer (Warner Bros. Cartoons, MGM Animation/Visual Arts), dies at age 64.
- March 16: Shug Fisher, American actor, singer, songwriter, musician, and comedian (voice of Uncle Pecos in the Tom and Jerry short "Pecos Pest"), dies at age 76.
- March 18: Paul Francis Webster, American lyricist (wrote the theme from Spider-Man), dies at age 76.
- March 28: Ben Washam, American animator (Warner Bros. Cartoons, Jay Ward Productions), dies at age 69.

=== April ===
- April 28: Treg Brown, American motion picture sound editor (Warner Bros. Cartoons), dies at age 84.

=== May ===
- May 2: Bob Clampett, American animator, director, producer and puppeteer (Warner Bros. Cartoons, Beany and Cecil), dies at age 70.
- May 13: Joop Geesink, Dutch comics artist and animator (Loeki de Leeuw, Dusty), dies at age 71.
- May 29: Aurelius Battaglia, American illustrator (Walt Disney Studios, United Productions of America), dies at age 74.
- Specific date unknown: Al Hubbard, American animator and comics artist (Walt Disney Animation Studios), dies at age 70 or 71.

=== June ===
- June 7: George Givot, Russian-American comedian and actor (voice of Tony in Lady and the Tramp), dies at age 81.

=== July ===
- July 3: Michiko Hirai, Japanese voice actress (voice of the title character in Sally the Witch, Starsha in Star Blazers), dies at age 48.
- July 14: Kenny Delmar, American actor (voice of Commander McBragg, The Hunter in King Leonardo and His Short Subjects, character of Senator Claghorn, inspiration for Foghorn Leghorn), dies at age 73.
- July 19: Harry Stockwell, American actor and singer (voice of the Prince in Snow White and the Seven Dwarfs), dies at age 82.
- July 27: James Mason, British actor (narrator of The Tell-Tale Heart), dies at age 75.
- July 29: Fred Waring, American bandleader and musician (Melody Time), dies at age 84.

=== August ===
- August 2: Quirino Cristiani, Italian-born Argentine animation director and cartoonist, created the world's first two animated feature films, and the first animated feature film with sound, pioneer of cutout animation, (El Apóstol, Sin dejar rastros, Firpo-Dempsey, Peludópolis, El mono relojero), dies at age 88.
- August 21: Phil Seuling, American organizer (founder of Comic Art Convention and Sea Gate Distributors) and actor (voice of one of the pig cops in Fritz the Cat), dies at age 50.

=== September ===
- September 19: Stan VanDerBeek, American film director and animator (Breath Death), dies at age 57.
- September 25: Laverne Harding, American animator and comics artist (Walter Lantz, Hanna-Barbera, DePatie-Freleng, Looney Tunes, Filmation), dies at age 78.

=== November ===
- November 14: Greg Irons, American underground cartoonist, animator, poster- and tattoo artist (Yellow Submarine), is killed by a bus in Bangkok, Thailand, at age 37.
- Specific date unknown: Brian White, British animator and comics artist (Animal Farm), dies at age 82.

=== December ===
- December 4: Jack Mercer, American actor, animator and script writer (Fleischer Studios, Paramount Pictures, voice of Popeye and Felix the Cat), dies from stomach cancer at age 74.
- December 10: Anton Loeb, American animator, cartoonist, and illustrator (Fleischer Studios), dies at age 76 from cancer.

=== Specific date unknown ===
- Vittorio Cossio, Italian comics artist and animator, dies at age 72 or 73.

== See also ==
- 1984 in anime
