= List of animated television series of 1984 =

A list of animated television series first aired in 1984.

Animated television series first aired in 1984
Title	Episodes	Country	Year	Notes	Technique
Dragon's Lair	13	United States	1984		Traditional
The Family-Ness	25	Scotland	1984–85		Traditional
Ferdy the Ant	52	Germany	1984–85		Traditional
The Get Along Gang	14 (Including pilot)	United States	1984		Traditional
Heathcliff	86	United States	1984–85	Also known as "Heathcliff and The Cadillac Cats" to differentiate it from the 1980 Ruby-Spears series.	Traditional
James the Cat	52	United Kingdom	1984–98		Traditional
Kidd Video	26	United States	1984–85		Traditional
Lucky Luke (1984)	26	France	1984–85		Traditional
Challenge of the GoBots	65	United States	1984–85		Traditional
Muppet Babies (1984)	107	United States	1984–91	Spin-off of The Muppet Show.	Traditional
The New Scooby Doo Mysteries	13	United States	1984	Second season of The New Scooby and Scrappy-Doo Show.	Traditional
Pink Panther and Sons	13	United States	1984	Version of Pink Panther.	Traditional
Pole Position	13	United States	1984		Traditional
Rainbow Brite	8	United States	1984–85		Traditional
Rub-a-Dub-Dub	25	United Kingdom	1984		Cut-Outs
Scary Scooby Funnies	20	United States	1984–85		Traditional
Sherlock Hound	26	United States	1984–85		Traditional
Snorks	65	United States	1984–89		Traditional
Super Friends: The Legendary Super Powers Show	8	United States	1984–85	Spin-off of Super Friends.	Traditional
Thomas & Friends	584	United Kingdom	1984–2021		Model (1984–2008); CGI (2009–21)
Tottie: The Story of a Doll's House	10	United Kingdom	1984		Stop-Motion
Towser	26	United Kingdom	1984		Cut-Outs
The Transformers	98	United States	1984–87		Traditional
Turbo Teen	13	United States	1984		Traditional
The Wind in the Willows	65	United Kingdom	1984–90		Stop-Motion
Wolf Rock TV	7	United States	1984		Traditional

Anime television series first aired in 1984
Title	Episodes	Country	Year	Notes	Technique
Adventures of the Little Koala	26	Japan	1984–85	Japanese title: Koala Boy Kokkii	Traditional
Adventures of Sanmao	4	Japan	1984		Traditional
Attacker You!	58	Japan	1984–85	Mila e Shiro, due cuori nella pallavolo (Italy), Juana y Sergio (Spanish), Jeanne et Serge (French)	Traditional
Bismark	51	Japan	1984–85	Later adapted into Saber Rider and the Star Sheriffs	Anime
Black Cat Detective	5	Japan	1984		Anime
Chikkun Takkun	23	Japan	1984		Anime
Chō Kōsoku Galvion	22	Japan	1984		Anime
Choriki Robo Galatt	25	Japan	1984–85		Anime
Dream Soldier Wing-Man	47	Japan	1984–85		Anime
Elves of the Forest	23	Japan	1984–85		Anime
Fist of the North Star	109	Japan	1984–87		Anime
Futari Daka	36	Japan	1984–85		Anime
Galactic Patrol Lensman	25	Japan	1984–85		Anime
Giant Gorg	26	Japan	1984		Anime
Glass Mask	23	Japan	1984		Anime
God Mazinger	23	Japan	1984		Anime
Gu Gu Ganmo	50	Japan	1984–85		Anime
Heavy Metal L-Gaim	54	Japan	1984–85		Anime
Katri, Girl of the Meadows	49	Japan	1984		Anime
Little Memole	50	Japan	1984–85	English title: Wee Wendy (USA)	Anime
Lupin the 3rd Part III: The Pink Jacket Adventures	50	Japan	1984–85		Anime
Mighty Orbots	13	Japan	1984		Anime
Noozles	26	Japan	1984	Japanese title: Fushigi na Koala Blinky	Anime
Okawari-Boy Starzan S	34	Japan	1984		Anime
Panzer World Galient	25	Japan	1984–85		Anime
Persia, the Magic Fairy	48	Japan	1984–85		Anime
Video Warrior Laserion	45	Japan	1984–85		Anime
Voltron	124	Japan	1984–85	Includes all dubbed Lion Force episodes, all exclusive Lion Force episodes and Vehicle Force episodes.	Anime
Super Dimension Cavalry Southern Cross	23	Japan	1984		Anime

== See also ==
- List of animated feature films of 1984
- List of Japanese animation television series of 1984
