= List of highest-grossing animated films of the 1980s =

The following are lists of the highest-grossing animated films of the 1980s.

== Highest-grossing animated films of the 1980s ==
Figures are given in U.S. dollars (USD). Walt Disney Animation Studios is the most represented studio with 5 feature films.

Top 20
Rank	Title	Country	Production Company	Distributor	Worldwide gross	Year	Ref
1	The Little Mermaid	U.S.	Walt Disney Pictures/Walt Disney Animation Studios	Buena Vista Pictures Distribution	$233,000,000	1989	
2	Oliver & Company	U.S.	Walt Disney Pictures/Walt Disney Animation Studios	Buena Vista Pictures Distribution	$100,000,000	1988	
3	An American Tail	U.S.	Amblin Entertainment/Don Bluth Productions	Universal Pictures	$84,542,002	1986	
4	The Land Before Time	U.S.	Amblin Entertainment/Don Bluth Productions	Universal Pictures	$84,460,846	1988	
5	The Fox and the Hound	U.S.	Walt Disney Pictures/Walt Disney Animation Studios	Buena Vista Pictures Distribution	$63,456,988	1981	
6	Akira	Japan	Tokyo Movie Shinsha/Akira Committee	Toho Co., Ltd.	$49,000,000	1988	
7	My Neighbor Totoro	Japan	Studio Ghibli	Tokuma Shoten	$42,000,000	1988	
8	The Care Bears Movie	Canada/U.S.	Metro-Goldwyn-Mayer/Nelvana	MGM/UA Distribution Co.	$34,000,000	1985	
9	All Dogs Go to Heaven	U.S.	Metro-Goldwyn-Mayer/Don Bluth Productions/Goldcrest	MGM/UA Distribution Co.	$27,100,027	1989	
10	The Great Mouse Detective	U.S.	Walt Disney Pictures/Walt Disney Animation Studios	Buena Vista Pictures Distribution	$25,336,794	1986	
11	Doraemon: Nobita and the Birth of Japan	Japan	Shin-Ei Animation/Fujiko Pro./Asatsu	Toho Co., Ltd.	$24,000,000	1989	
12	The Black Cauldron	U.S.	Walt Disney Pictures/Walt Disney Animation Studios	Buena Vista Pictures Distribution	$21,288,692	1985	
13	Heavy Metal	Canada	Guardian Trust Company/Canadian Film Development Corporation (CFDC)	Columbia Pictures	$21,100,000	1981	
14	Kiki's Delivery Service	Japan	Studio Ghibli	Tokuma Shoten	$18,000,000	1989	
15	Fist of the North Star	Japan	Toei Animation	Toei Company	$18,000,000	1986	
16	Castle in the Sky	Japan	Studio Ghibli	Tokuma Shoten	$14,812,500	1986	
17	The Secret of NIMH	U.S.	Metro-Goldwyn-Mayer/Don Bluth Productions/Aurora Productions	MGM/UA Distribution Co.	$14,665,733	1982	
18	Doraemon: The Records of Nobita, Spaceblazer	Japan	Shin-Ei Animation/Fujiko Pro./Asatsu	Toho Co., Ltd.	$14,400,000	1981	
19	Little Nemo: Adventures in Slumberland	Japan/U.S.	Tokyo Movie Shinsha	Toho-Towa/Hemdale Film Corporation	$14,051,242	1989	
20	Doraemon: Nobita's Great Adventure into the Underworld	Japan	Shin-Ei Animation/Fujiko Pro./Asatsu	Toho Co., Ltd.	$13,500,000	1984	

=== Highest-grossing film by year ===
Year	Title	Worldwide gross	Budget	Ref(s)
1980	Doraemon: Nobita's Dinosaur	¥1,550,000,000^{JP} ($6,200,000)	TBD	
1981	The Fox and the Hound	$63,456,988^{*} ($39,900,000)^{*}	$12,000,000	
1982	The Secret of NIMH	$14,665,733^{*}	$7,000,000	
1983	Harmagedon: Genma Wars	¥1,060,000,000^{JP} ($4,500,000)	TBD	
1984	Doraemon: Nobita's Great Adventure into the Underworld	¥1,650,000,000^{JP} ($13,500,000)	TBD	
1985	The Care Bears Movie	$34,000,000 ($22,934,622)^{*}	$2,000,000–4,500,000	
1986	An American Tail	$84,542,002	$9,000,000	
1987	Doraemon: Nobita and the Knights on Dinosaurs	¥1,500,000,000^{JP} ($9,800,000)	TBD	
1988	Oliver and Company	$121,000,000+ ($100,000,000)+	$31,000,000	
1989	The Little Mermaid	$233,000,000 ($84,355,863)^{*}	$40,000,000	

- ^{*}U.S. and Canada gross only
- ^{JP}Japanese gross only

== See also ==
- List of animated feature films of the 1980s
