= List of animated feature films of the 1980s =

Lists of animated feature films released in the 1980s organized by year of release:

- List of animated feature films of 1980
- List of animated feature films of 1981
- List of animated feature films of 1982
- List of animated feature films of 1983
- List of animated feature films of 1984
- List of animated feature films of 1985
- List of animated feature films of 1986
- List of animated feature films of 1987
- List of animated feature films of 1988
- List of animated feature films of 1989

== See also ==
- List of highest-grossing animated films of the 1980s
