= 1984 in anime =

- Years in anime: 1981 1982 1983 1984 1985 1986 1987
- Centuries: 19th century · 20th century · 21st century
- Decades: 1950s 1960s 1970s 1980s 1990s 2000s 2010s
- Years: 1981 1982 1983 1984 1985 1986 1987

The events of 1984 in anime.

== Events ==
- June 22 - APPP is created

== Accolades ==
- Ōfuji Noburō Award: Nausicaä of the Valley of the Wind

== Releases ==
Released	Title	Type	Director	Studio	Ref
January 7	Starzan S	TV series	Hidehito Ueda	Tatsunoko Production	
January 8	Katri, Girl of the Meadows	TV series	Hiroshi Saitō	Nippon Animation	
February 3	Chō Kōsoku Galvion	TV series	Koichi Ohata	Artmic, Kokusai Eiga-sha, Studio Robin	
February 4	Heavy Metal L-Gaim	TV series	Yoshiyuki Tomino	Nippon Sunrise	
February 7	Yume Senshi Wingman	TV series	Tomoharu Katsumata	Toei Animation	
February 11	The Star of Cottonland	Film	Shinichi Tsuji	Mushi Production	
February 11	Urusei Yatsura 2: Beautiful Dreamer	Film	Mamoru Oshii	Studio Pierrot	
February 21	Lolita Anime	OVA series	Kuni Toniro, R. Ching, Mickey Soda, Mickey Masuda	Wonder Kids	
March 3	Little Memole	TV series	Osamu Kasai	Toei Animation	
March 3	Lupin III Part III	TV series	Yuzo Aoki, Osamu Nabeshima, Shigetsugu Yoshida	TMS	
March 4	Video Warrior Laserion	TV series	Kozo Morishita	Toei Animation	
March 11	Mirai Shōnen Conan Tokubetsu Hen-Kyodaiki Gigant no Fukkatsu	Film	Hayao Miyazaki	Nippon Animation	
March 11	Nausicaä of the Valley of the Wind	Film	Hayao Miyazaki	Top Craft, Tokuma Shoten, Hakuhodo	
March 17	Ninja Hattori-kun + Perman: ESP Wars	Film	Masuji Harada	Shin-Ei Animation	
March 17	Doraemon: Nobita's Great Adventure into the Underworld	Film	Tsutomu Shibayama	Shin-Ei Animation	
March 18	Gu Gu Ganmo	TV series	Yoshimichi Nitta	Toei Animation	
April 5	Giant Gorg	TV series	Yoshikazu Yasuhiko	Nippon Sunrise	
April 7	Showdown! The 7 Justice Supermen vs. The Space Samurais	TV special	Yasuo Yamayoshi	Toei Animation	
April 9	Chikkun Takkun	TV series	Hayakawa Keizi, Osamu Masami	Studio Pierrot	
April 9	Glass Mask	TV series	Gisaburō Sugii	Eiken	
April 13	Attacker You!	TV series	Kazuyuki Okaseko, Masari Sasahiro	Knack Productions	
April 14	Witch Era	Film	Hiroshi Fukutomi	Nippon Animation	
April 15	God Mazinger	TV series	Yoshio Hayakawa	TMS Entertainment	
April 15	Super Dimension Cavalry Southern Cross	TV series	Yasuo Hasegawa	Tatsunoko	
July 6	Persia, the Magic Fairy	TV series	Kazuyoshi Katayama	Studio Pierrot	
July 7	Lensman: Secret of The Lens	Film	Yoshiaki Kawajiri, Kazuyuki Hirokawa	Madhouse, MK Productions	
July 7	Macross: Do You Remember Love?	Film	Shōji Kawamori, Noboru Ishiguro	Studio Nue, Artland, Tatsunoko, Topcraft	
July 7	Noozles	TV series	Taku Sugiyama	Nippon Animation	
July 14	The Kabocha Wine: Nita no Aijou Monogatari	Film	Kimio Yabuki	Toei Animation	
July 14	Kinnikuman	Film	Takeshi Shirato	Toei Animation	
August 11	Cream Lemon	OVA series			
August 19	Bagi, the Monster of Mighty Nature	TV film	Osamu Tezuka	Tezuka Productions	
September 5	Nine 3: Final	TV film	Gisaburō Sugii	Group TAC	
September 5	Birth	OVA film	Shinya Sadamitsu	Idol, Kaname Production	
September 20	Futari Daka	TV series	Tokizō Tsuchiya	Kokusai Eiga-sha	
October 4	Adventures of the Little Koala	TV series	Takashi Tanazawa	Topcraft	
October 4	Fist of the North Star	TV series	Toyoo Ashida	Toei Animation	
October 5	Elves of the Forest	TV series	Masakazu Higuchi	Zuiyo Enterprise, Shaft	
October 5	Panzer World Galient	TV series	Ryōsuke Takahashi	Nippon Sunrise	
October 5	Choriki Robo Galatt	TV series	Takeyuki Kanda, Osamu Sekita, Tetsuro Amino, Mamoru Hamazu, Hiroshi Negishi, Hideki Tonokatsu, Susumu Ishizaki, Shinya Sadamitsu	Nippon Sunrise	
October 6	Lensman	TV series	Hiroshi Fukutomi	MK Productions	
October 7	Bismark	TV series	Masami Anno	Studio Pierrot	
October 8	Cat's Eye	TV series	Kenji Kodama	Tokyo Movie Shinsha	
October 9	Taotao	TV series	Shuichi Nakahara, Tatsuo Shimamura	Mushi Production, Studio Cosmos	
October 28	Eien no Once More	OVA film	Osamu Kobayashi, Mochizuki Tomomichi	Studio Pierrot	
October 28	Kachua Kara no Tayori	OVA film	Takeyuki Kanda	Nippon Sunrise	
November 6	Sherlock Hound	TV series	Kyosuke Mikuriya, Hayao Miyazaki	Tokyo Movie Shinsha, RAI	
December 15	Lolita Anime	OVA series	Aki Uchiyama	Nikkatsu Video	
December 21	Atsumatta 13-nin	OVA film	Takeyuki Kanda	Nippon Sunrise	
December 22	Dr. Slump and Arale-chan: Hoyoyo! The Treasure of Nanaba Castle	Film	Hiroki Shibata	Toei Animation	
December 22	Great Riot! Seigi Choujin	Film	Takeshi Shirato	Toei Animation	
	Once Upon a Time... Space (as Galaxy Patrol PJ)	TV series		Eiken	

== See also ==
- 1984 in animation
