= List of animated feature films of 1984 =

This is a list of animated feature films first released in 1984.

== List ==
Title	Country	Director	Production company	Animation technique	Format	Notes	Release date	Duration
84 Taekwon V 로보트 태권V - 84 태권브이 (Roboteu Taegwon Beui - 84 Taegwon Beui)	South Korea	Kim Cheong-gi	Seoul Donghwa Productions Co., Ltd.	Traditional	Theatrical		August 4, 1984	77 minutes
The Adventures of Pinocchio	United States	Ippei Kuri; Jim Terry	Century Video Corporation; American Way; Harmony Gold; Tatsunoko Productions	Traditional	Direct-to-video	Film compiled from TV series episodes	June 8, 1984	98 minutes
The Adventures of Sam the Squirrel; Misi Mókus kalandjai	Hungary	Ottó Foky	Pannónia Filmstúdió	Stop motion			January 19, 1984	80 minutes
Adventures of the Blue Knight; Przygody błękitnego rycerzyka	Poland	Lechosław Marszałek	Studio Filmów Rysunkowych	Traditional	Theatrical		February 1, 1984	90 minutes
Bagi, the Monster of Mighty Nature 大自然の魔獣 バギ (Daishizen no Majū Bagi)	Japan	Osamu Tezuka	Tezuka Productions; Nippon TV	Traditional	Television film	Seventh animated special produced for Nippon TV's 24 Hour TV "Love Saves the Earth" telethon.	August 19, 1984	85 minutes
Birth a. k. a. Planet Busters, The World of the Talisman バース (Bāsu)	Japan	Shinya Sadamitsu	Idol; Kaname Production	Traditional	Direct-to-video; OVA		August 21, 1984	80 minutes
Boukenshatachi: Gamba to 7-biki no Naka Ma 冒険者たち ガンバと7匹のなかま (The Adventurers: Gamba and His 7 Friends)	Japan	Shinzo Azaki	Tokyo Movie Shinsha	Traditional	Theatrical	Film compiled from TV series episodes	March 4, 1984	93 minutes
The Camel Boy	Australia	Yoram Gross	Yoram Gross Studios	Traditional	Theatrical		May 8, 1984	72 minutes
Chiisana Koi no Monogatari: Chichi to Sally Hatsukoi no Shiki 小さな恋のものがたり チッチとサリー初恋の四季 (A Little Love Story: Chichi and Sally's First Four Seasons of Love)	Japan	Toshio Hirata	MK Animation; TBS	Traditional	Television film		March 20, 1984	71 minutes
Creamy Mami, the Magic Angel: Forever Once More 魔法の天使クリィミーマミ 永遠のワンスモア (Mahō no Tenshi Kurīmī Mami: Eien no Once More)	Japan	Osamu Kobayashi; Mochizuki Tomomichi	Studio Pierrot	Traditional	Direct-to-video; OVA		October 28, 1984	45 minutes
Delta Space Mission; Misiunea spațială Delta	Romania	Victor Antonescu; Mircea Toia	Animafilm	Traditional	Theatrical			68 minutes
Dokgo-Tak 2 – My Name is Dokgo-Tak 내 이름은 독고탁 (Dokgotak 2 – Nae Ireumeun Dokgotak)	South Korea	Hong Sang-man	Daewon Animation Co., Ltd.	Traditional	Theatrical	Second feature in the Dokgo-Tak film series.	July 15, 1984	70 minutes
Doraemon: Nobita's Great Adventure into the Underworld ドラえもん のび太の魔界大冒険 (Doraemon: Nobita no Makai Dai Bōken)	Japan	Tsutomu Shibayama	Shin-Ei Animation; Asatsu; Toho	Traditional	Theatrical		March 17, 1984	97 minutes
Dr. Slump and Arale-chan: Hoyoyo! The Treasure of Nanaba Castle; Dr.スランプ アラレちゃん ほよよ!ナナバ城の秘宝 (Dokutā Suranpu Arare-chan Hoyoyo! Nanaba-jō no Hihō)	Japan	Hiroki Shibata	Toei Animation	Traditional	Theatrical		December 22, 1984	48 minutes
Earth Story Telepath 2500 地球物語 テレパス2500 (Chikyū Monogatari Telepath 2500)	Japan	Shigeyuki Yamane	Shochiku (distributor); Tatsunoko Production	Traditional	Theatrical		August 4, 1984	105 minutes
L'Enfant invisible The Invisible Child	France	André Lindon	Les Éditions de Minuit	Traditional	Theatrical		March 7, 1984	63 minutes
Future Boy Conan: The Revival of the Giant Machine 未来少年コナン特別篇 巨大機ギガントの復活 (Mirai Shounen Conan: Kyodaiki Gigant no Fukkatsu)	Japan	Hayao Miyazaki	Nippon Animation; Shochiku (distributor)	Traditional	Theatrical		March 11, 1984	47 minutes
Gallavants	United States	Art Vitello	Marvel Productions; Shapiro Entertainment	Traditional	Theatrical		November 28, 1984	100 minutes
Heroic Times; Daliás idők (Dalia's Times)	Hungary	József Gémes	Pannónia Filmstúdió	Traditional	Theatrical		August 30, 1984	79 minutes
John the Fearless; Jan Zonder Vrees (Jan Without Fear)	Belgium	Jef Cassiers	Belgische Radio en Televisie (BRT)	Traditional	Theatrical		July 10, 1984	78 minutes
Kakkun Cafe カッくんカフェ	Japan	Osamu Kobayashi	Ajia-do Animation Works; Kakkun Productions; Joy Pack Film	Traditional	Theatrical	Fictionalised tribute to Kakuei “Kakkun” Tanaka (May 4, 1918 – December 16, 1993), a Japanese politician and former Prime Minister of Japan.	September 22, 1984	86 minutes
Katy; Katy, la oruga	Mexico	José Luis Moro; Santiago Moro	Televicine S.A. de C.V. Moro Creativos Asociados	Traditional	Theatrical		July 5, 1984	86 minutes
Kenya Boy a. k. a. Kenya of My Youth; Shōnen Keniya	Japan	Tetsuo Imazawa; Nobuhiko Obayashi	Toei Animation	Traditional	Theatrical		March 10, 1984	109 minutes
The King of Inventions 꾸러기 발명왕 (Kkureogi Balmyeongwang)	South Korea	Kim Cheong-gi	Seoul Donghwa Productions Co., Ltd.	Traditional	Theatrical		April 28, 1984	83 minutes
Kinnikuman: Showdown! The 7 Justice Supermen vs. The Space Samurais キン肉マン 決戦!7人の正義超人vs宇宙野武士 (Kessen! Shichinin no Seigi Choujin vs Uchuu Nobushi)	Japan	Yasuo Yamayoshi	Toei Animation	Traditional	Television special		April 7, 1984	73 minutes
Kinnikuman: Great Riot! Justice Superman キン肉マン 大暴れ!正義超人 (Kinnikuman Ō Abare! Seigi Choujin)	Japan	Takeshi Shirato	Toei Animation	Traditional	Theatrical		December 22, 1984	48 minutes
Kinnikuman: Stolen Championship Belt キン肉マン 奪われたチャンピオンベルト (Kinnikuman Ubawareta Chanpion Beruto)	Japan	Takeshi Shirato	Toei Animation	Traditional	Theatrical		July 14, 1984	48 minutes
Kuroi Ame ni Utarete 黒い雨に打たれて (Beaten by Black Rain)	Japan	Takeshi Shirato	GEN Productions; Tsuchida Production	Traditional	Theatrical		August 12, 1984	95 minutes
Lensman	Japan	Yoshiaki Kawajiri; Kazuyuki Hirokawa	Madhouse	Traditional	Theatrical		July 7, 1984	107 minutes
Locke the Superman 超人ロック (Choujin Locke)	Japan	Hiroshi Fukutomi	Nippon Animation; Shochiku (distributor)	Traditional	Theatrical		April 14, 1984	120 minutes
Macross: Do You Remember Love? 超時空要塞マクロス 愛・おぼえていますか (Chōjikū Yōsai Makurosu: Ai Oboete Imasu ka)	Japan	Shōji Kawamori; Noboru Ishiguro	Studio Nue; Artland; Tatsunoko Production; Toho	Traditional	Theatrical		July 21, 1984	115 minutes
Malá čarodějnice The Little Witch	Czechoslovakia; West Germany	Zdeněk Smetana	Krátký Film Praha	Traditional; Cutout		Film compiled from TV series episodes		89 minutes
Meitantei Holmes: Aoi Ruby no Maki / Kaitei no Zaihō no Maki 名探偵ホームズ 青い紅玉の巻/海底の財宝の巻	Japan	Hayao Miyazaki	Tokyo Movie Shinsha	Traditional	Theatrical	Film compiled from episodes 5 ("The Adventure of the Blue Carbuncle") and 9 ("Treasure Under the Sea") of the television series.	March 11, 1984	46 minutes
Nausicaä of the Valley of the Wind 風の谷のナウシカ (Kaze no tani no Naushika)	Japan	Hayao Miyazaki	Topcraft; Tokuma Shoten; Hakuhodo; Toei Company (distributor)	Traditional	Theatrical	While created before Studio Ghibli was founded, the film is considered to be the beginning of the studio.	March 11, 1984	117 minutes
Nine: Final ナイン 完結編 (Nine: Kanketsuhen)	Japan	Gisaburō Sugii	Group TAC; Fuji TV	Traditional	Television film		September 5, 1984	73 minutes
Ninja Hattori-kun + Perman: ESP Wars 忍者ハットリくん＋パーマン 超能力ウォーズ (Ninja Hattori-kun + Pāman Chō-Nōryoku Wars)	Japan	Hiroshi Sasagawa	Shin-Ei Animation	Traditional	Theatrical		March 17, 1984	52 minutes
Oshin おしん	Japan	Eiichi Yamamoto	Sanrio	Traditional	Theatrical		March 17, 1984	122 minutes
Papa Mama Bye bye パパママバイバイ	Japan	Hiroki Shibata	Eizo Kikaku Co., Ltd. Toei Animation	Traditional	Theatrical		July 8, 1984	75 minutes
The Phantom Treehouse	Australia	Paul Williams	Fable Film Productions; Phantom Treehouse Ltd.	Traditional			?	76 minutes
Phoenix-bot Phoenix King a. k. a. Defenders of Space 불사조 로보트 피닉스 킹 (Bulsajo Roboteu Pinikseu King)	South Korea	Jeong Su-yong	Daekwang Planning	Traditional	Theatrical		January 20, 1984	67 minutes
Pro Yakyū o 10-bai Tanoshiku Miru Hōhō Part 2 プロ野球を10倍楽しく見る方法PART2 (How to Enjoy Watching Professional Baseball 10 Times More Part 2)	Japan	Kiyoshi Suzuki; Tetsu Dezaki	Magic Bus	Traditional	Theatrical		April 21, 1984	105 minutes
Radio City Fantasy 街角のメルヘン (Machikado no Märchen)	Japan	Mizuho Nishikubo	Kitty Films	Traditional	Direct-to-video; OVA		July 21, 1984	54 minutes
Return of the Dinosaurs	Japan	Akira Tsuburaya	Tsuburaya Productions	Traditional	Direct-to-video; Compilation film	Compilation film of the animated television series Kyōryū Tankentai Born Free that ran from October 1, 1976, to March 25, 1977, for a total of 25 episodes.	July 8, 1984	82 minutes
The Roots of Goofy	United States	?	Walt Disney Productions (archive footage); Disney Channel (distributor)	Traditional	Television special Compilation film	Compilation of Disney theatrical animated shorts starring Goofy; retread adaptation of "The Adventure Story" (Season 3, Episode 19 of Disneyland; aired March 20, 1957), narrated by Gary Owens in live-action frame segments.	August 2, 1984	90 minutes
Samson & Sally; Samson og Sally	Denmark	Jannik Hastrup	Dansk Tegnefilm	Traditional	Theatrical		October 12, 1984	60 minutes
Saving Mother 西岳奇童 (Xiyue Qitong)	China	Jìn Xi; Liu Huiyi	Shanghai Animation Film Studio	Stop motion	Theatrical		?	55 minutes
The Secret of the Selenites; Le Secret des Sélénites	France	Jean Image	Films Jean Image; Films A2	Traditional	Theatrical		February 1, 1984	76 minutes
Snow White; Hófehér	Hungary	József Nepp	Pannónia Filmstúdió	Traditional	Theatrical		July 5, 1984	89 minutes
The Snowman; Njeriu prej Bore	Albania	?	Albfilm	Traditional	Television film		?	44 minutes
The Soldier's Tale	United States	R. O. Blechman	R. O. Blechman Inc. WGBH	Traditional	Television special		November 29, 1984	51 minutes
The Star of Cottonland 綿の国星 (Wata no Kunihoshi)	Japan	Shinichi Tsuji	Mushi Production	Traditional	Theatrical		February 11, 1984	92 minutes
The Tale of Tsar Saltan; Сказка о царе Салтане, Skazka o tsarye Saltanye	Soviet Union	Lev Milchin; Ivan Ivanov-Vano	Soyuzmultfilm	Traditional			January 1, 1984	56 minutes
TimeFighters	Japan	Jim Terry; Ippei Kuri	Jim Terry Productions; Tatsunoko Productions; American Way; Kidpix	Traditional	Direct-to-video; Compilation film	Compilation film of the animated television series Time Bokan that ran from October 4, 1975, to December 25, 1976, for a total of 61 episodes.	?	99 minutes
TimeFighters in the Land of Fantasy	Japan	Jim Terry	Jim Terry Productions; Tatsunoko Productions; Kidpix	Traditional	Direct-to-video; Compilation film	Same details as above.	?	95 minutes
UFO Reul Tagoon Oegyein Wangja; UFO를 타고온 외계인 왕자 (Alien Prince Riding a UFO)	South Korea	Jo Min-cheol	Korea Educational Film Company	Traditional	Theatrical		January 1, 1984	67 minutes
Urusei Yatsura 2: Beautiful Dreamer うる星やつら2 ビューティフルドリーマー (Urusei Yatsura 2: Byūtifuru Dorīmā)	Japan	Mamoru Oshii	Studio Pierrot	Traditional	Theatrical	Second feature in the Urusei Yatsura film series.	February 11, 1984	96 minutes
Vacationing with Mickey and Friends	United States	?	Walt Disney Productions (archive footage); Disney Channel (distributor)	Traditional	Television special Compilation film	Compilation of vacation-based Disney theatrical animated shorts; narrated by Gary Owens in live-action frame segments.	August 2, 1984	90 minutes
Video Ranger 007 비디오 레인저 007 (Bidio reinjeo 007)	South Korea	Lee Seong-woo	Daewon Donghwa Co., Ltd.	Traditional	Theatrical		December 22, 1984	72 minutes

== See also ==
- List of animated television series of 1984
