= Phoenix King =

Phoenix King may refer to:

- Phoenix King (Warhammer)
- The Phoenix King, the title of the sovereign of the Kingdom of Great Joseon, similar in context to the Dragon emperor of imperial China
- Phoenix-bot Phoenix King, a South Korean animated feature film
- Phoenix King (formerly Fire Lord) Ozai, a character in Avatar: The Last Airbender
- "The Phoenix King", part 1 of Sozin's Comet: The Final Battle, the series finale of Avatar: The Last Airbender
- Phoenix King, a wrestler tag team Ark Angels in the 1999 CWA Tag Team Championship (New England)

== See also ==
- Phoenix (disambiguation)
