= Video ranger 007 =

Video Ranger 007
- Directed by: Lee Sung-woo
- Written by: Seo Hyun-jae
- Produced by: Jung Wook
- Cinematography: Lee Seong-woo
- Edited by: Jeon Byeong-tae
- Music by: Kim Kyung-il
- Production company: Daewon Media
- Distributed by: Aju Video Production
- Release date: 22 December 1984
- Running time: 71 minutes
- Country: South Korea
- Language: Korean

Video Ranger 007 (Korean: 비디오 레인져 007) is a South Korean animated theatrical film based on the Japanese anime television series Video Warrior Laserion produced in 1984 by Daewon Media.

== Production ==
Most of the drawings were pirated from the Japanese animation sequences from works such as Video Warrior Laserion that Daewon Media was outsourcing for Japanese animation studio Toei Doga.

== Arrest ==
The director for the film was arrested for breach of copyright.

== Characters ==
- Kang-To (강토) / Takashi Katori in Video Warrior Laserion
- Erena (에레나) / Olivia Lawrence in Video Warrior Laserion
