= Oddballs (TV series) =

Animated streaming television series

- Genre: Animated sitcom; Adventure
- Created by: James Rallison; Ethan Banville
- Voices of: James Rallison; Julian Gant; Kimberly Brooks
- Composer: Ben Bromfield
- Countries of origin: United States; Canada
- Original language: English
- No. of seasons: 2
- No. of episodes: 20

Production
- Executive producers: James Rallison; Ethan Banville; Carl Faruolo; Michael Zoumas; Matthew Berkowitz; Aaron Behl; Jennifer Twiner McCarron
- Producers: Sarah Soh (Note: Supervising producer); Alex Cichon; Caroline Lagrange (Note: Line producer); Tini Wider
- Editor: Megan McShane
- Running time: 15–17 minutes
- Production companies: Netflix Animation Studios; Atomic Cartoons

Original release
- Network: Netflix
- Release: October 7, 2022 – February 24, 2023

Oddballs is an animated sitcom created by James Rallison and Ethan Banville for Netflix. Produced by Netflix Animation, with animation services by Atomic Cartoons, the series debuted on October 7, 2022. The show features a total of twelve 15–17 minute episodes in its first season, and eight in the second and final season, which was released on February 24, 2023, totaling 20 episodes.

== Premise ==
Oddballs takes place in the fictional town of Dirt, Arizona. It follows James, a bubble-shaped kid who goes on bizarre adventures with his best friends; a dim-witted crocodile named Max, and, as of the 4th episode, a time-travelling girl named Echo. During each episode, James's rants and questioning of social norms often end up in a disaster.

== Voice cast and characters ==
=== Main ===
- James Rallison as:
  - James, a fictionalized version of Rallison, resembles Rallison's avatar on his YouTube channel (TheOdd1sOut). He is a bubble-shaped teenage boy who enjoys insane misadventures and going on rants, including subjects like toasters, trophies and line-cutting.
  - Sagu, a talking cactus that houses James' trailer/treehouse.
- Julian Gant as Max, a dim-witted anthropomorphic crocodile who is a failed genetic experiment gifted with human intelligence and voice, James's next-door neighbour and best friend. He was previously seen in the music video for Rallison and David Brown's song "Life Is Fun".
- Kimberly Brooks as Echo, a time-travelling teenage girl who comes from the future and loves eating food, as she comes from a future where processed food went extinct as the result of James and Max's action of giving sentience to Toasty/Declan. Although best friends with James and Max, she sometimes clashes with the former due to her egotism and not believing that she's from the future.

=== Supporting ===
- Carl Faruolo as:
  - Greg, Max's father.
  - Stuart, a stereotypical bully slime blob who is capable of possessing people and a proficient chess player.
- Erika Ishii as:
  - Jenna, Max's sister works at the "uBreak, iDon't Judge" electronics repair shop.
  - Liv, Max's mother shows a cold and calculating demeanor towards him.
- Scott Menville as Toasty / Declan, an artificially intelligent toaster created by James and Max who becomes evil.
  - Kari Wahlgren as young Toasty
- Harland Williams as Patrick, James' father who is usually mild-mannered and submissive.
- Debra Wilson as Louise, James' mother who is an astrophysicist, shows a stricter attitude towards her son.
- Gary Anthony Williams as Mr. McFly, an anthropomorphic fly teacher at the Dirt school.
- Nicolas Cantu as Smooth/Wrinkly Jason from the episode "Emo Like the Wolfstank".
- Emily Eiden as Maz Scare-Ah, a goth unicorn.
- Fred Stoller as Foodball Joe
- Parvesh Cheena as Principal Loudspeaker
- Stephen Stanton as Chef Throgbort
- Misty Lee as Roxanne
- Paul Rugg as Doctor Bolster
- Bob Bergen as Geefus
- Jane Lynch as Grand-Ma
- Ethan Banville as Bob Awman
- Courtenay Taylor as Doctor Squats
- Ryan George as Byron Sellers

== Production ==
In early 2020, James Rallison and Ethan Banville pitched their new series to Netflix, which was subsequently picked up by the streaming service in August of the same year. Due to the COVID-19 pandemic and the resulting lockdowns, the entire production of the show was done remotely. Despite this, the first season of the show was set to premiere later in the year, as Rallison announced in a video. In September 2022, the official trailer for the first season was released on various YouTube channels, along with an official release date of October 7. Rallison also uploaded a video detailing the process of pitching the show and creating its screenwriting bible. The second season of the show was announced in January 2023, with an official trailer released shortly after and the season airing on February 24 of the same year. The show was animated using Toon Boom, with Hallis Blaney serving as animation director. However, in May 2023, Banville announced the cancellation of the show's comeback for season 3 and the release of a graphic novel called Oddballs: The Graphic Novel, which features five stories originally intended for the show. Ultimately, Oddballs ran for just 20 episodes and two seasons on Netflix before its cancellation.

== Episodes ==
=== Series overview ===
Season	Episodes	Originally released
1	12	October 7, 2022
2	8	February 24, 2023

=== Season 1 (2022) ===
No. overall	No. in season	Title	Directed by	Written by	Original release date
1	1	"Raising Toasty"	Carl Faruolo	James Rallison, Ethan Banville & Carl Faruolo	October 7, 2022
James and Max have a sleepover and plan on making the perfect breakfast by making the perfect toast. However, the toaster ends up burning the bread, leaving Max and James frustrated. James proposes the idea of making a "smart toaster", and so they insert an AI chip into the toaster to create one. After they creates the smart toaster, it becomes sentient with a childlike personality and they name him Toasty. James and Max try to raise Toasty, but due to their differing backgrounds, they disagree on the best ways to do it, and begin arguing. As a result, Toasty turns evil and starts attacking them with toast. James and Max try to stop him, but Toasty escapes and runs to the nearby bread factory on top of a hill. While Max is seemingly wounded by Toasty, James catches up to him and calms him, secretly removing his AI chip, which deactivates Toasty. As a final act, Toasty creates the perfect piece of toast. Back at James and Max's tree-house, they throw the AI chip and Toasty in the trash, and their toast as it is, but afterwards the AI chip falls into Toasty and he becomes sentient again without their knowledge.
2	2	"Breaking and Entering"	Jouchelle Miranda	James Rallison, Ethan Banville & Carl Faruolo	October 7, 2022
James wants a smartphone instead of his old and broken flip phone, and so he tries to convince his mom to buy him one, but she believes he is not responsible enough to get one after seeing how he uses his worthless flip phone. He tells Max that he'll give him his old one (which Max wants). Begrudgingly, his mom brings him to the lab where she works and fuses him with a smartphone, telling him that if he can go 24 hours without damaging himself, she will get him a smartphone. James, excited, decides to use his smartphone body to do things like instant cake delivery, show baby photos of his teacher Mr. McFly (which leads to him being fired), and give the restaurant Foodball Joe's a 1-star review. However, right when he's about to go home, Max high-fives him, cracking his hand. Max takes James to his sister to fix him in exchange for food from Foodball Joe's. To get the food, James must apologize to the owner of the restaurant and is painfully used as a thermometer, but after his burning, he gets fixed. Max's sister also fixes James' flip phone for Max to use. James rides home with Mr. McFly, who became a rideshare driver after he lost his job at the school. When James gets home, he accidentally confesses to his mom what happened after she lies about his data saying he got wet. Max then angrily throws the flip phone to James, cracking him again.
3	3	"Wanted Dead or a Fly"	Annisa Adjani & Sarah Soh	Darin Henry	October 7, 2022
While procrastinating on homework, James kills a fly that is interrupting him. The next day, James and Max find out their teacher Mr. McFly's grandma went missing around James' house and he's starting a search party, causing James and Max to believe they might have killed her. When they get home, James buries the body, returning to find that Max has murdered several more flies. When they go to a store to get a shovel, Mr. McFly comes in and tells the cashier that 8 more family members have gone missing. When they begin to go home, they are pursued by Mr. McFly, who then comes to James' house with tools. When James confesses, Mr. McFly informs him that his grandma was just holding a party that he wasn't invited to and James' parents had hired him to clean their gutters. The next day, James is arrested after Max confesses to the police out of panic. James exercises in prison before he is released in one day and meets up with Max. They are then chased by a horde of mosquitoes after James kills one of them.
4	4	"Line Cutters"	Chelsea Ker	Darin Henry	October 7, 2022
James and Max are in line to eat ribs when suddenly a girl who claims to be from the future cuts in front of the line. James tells Roxanne, a sentient rock police officer, about the situation, but she sends all three to the back of the line. The girl says she is named Echo and that she came from a future where processed food doesn't exist. She also says that a mysterious doctor in James' time period began the chaos in the future. James doesn't believe her, but Max does. James then plays Rock Paper Scissors with Roxanne, saying that if he wins, he can return to his position in line, but if he loses he gets kicked out, and James somehow ends up losing. Echo says that the cooks who made the ribs are aliens who plan on eating the humans. Max, desperate, sneak to where the ribs are located, and the trio eat them. Despite this, the cook finds them and reveals himself to be a fly-like alien, as Echo predicted. The aliens capture James and Max and prepare to eat them, but Echo easily defeats the aliens after James admits she was right about their true nature all along. The aliens leave and they have the ribs to themselves, but before they can eat, Roxanne discovers them. James plays another round of Rock Paper Scissors with Roxanne, but he loses again and the trio are kicked out.
5	5	"Boy with Two Brains"	Sarah Soh	Ethan Banville	October 7, 2022
James discovers that a group of lockers, including his, have been downsized so that a trophy case can be expanded to hold more participation trophies. While James complains about trophies having no worth anymore, Stuart, a slime kid, attacks Mr. McFly for giving him a D. When James shoves a bunch of trophies out of the way to fit his books on the shelf, one of them hits Stuart, freeing Mr. McFly, who then awards James the Nicest Person Award. Stuart, looking to exact his revenge, enters James' body by making his body a liquid in James' trophy for him to drink. James, controlled by Stuart, wreaks havoc on Dirt. James, despite being controlled by Stuart, tries to keep his role as the nicest person, but constantly fails. Max and Echo attempt to help James by performing an exorcism on him. In the exorcism, they read a children's book to Stuart and give him hot sauce, but they fail to get Stuart to leave. Eventually, James realizes that Stuart just wanted an award, changes his award from Nicest Person to Wurst Person, and gives it to Stuart, convincing him to leave his body.
6	6	"Emo Like the Wolfstank"	Annisa Adjani	Nick Lopez	October 7, 2022
In the locker room, Max is applying deodorant when James comes in upset he doesn't have a "thing", such as Max being king of the Competitive Feelings Squad. James complains about sweating for the first time and puts deodorant on his face, to Max's disgust. James' eyes begin to water, which he gets bullied for by Stuart. However, he stands up to Stuart and Stuart gives up. Mr. McFly is impressed and allows James to join the Competitive Feelings Squad for the big competition the next day. James officially joins, allowing him to find his "thing". James celebrates, but Max becomes angry with him because he stole his spotlight in the club by using the deodorant to cheat. The next day at the competition, James is pulled aside by Mr. McFly, who introduces Smooth Jason, Max's opponent, to James. Roxanne announces Smooth Jason against Max in the topic "Honesty in Sports". They both talk and Smooth Jason wins. James comes over to help and argues with Smooth Jason and wins. After winning one of the rounds, he finds he's run out of deodorant and goes to his stash, where he is confronted by Max. He refuses to give James the deodorant, still angry that he's stolen his "thing". James eventually gets it. James and Smooth Jason go against each other in the final round, a debate about stealing your best friend's "thing". James confesses to cheating and then gives a speech about how it's Max's "thing". Smooth Jason has a meltdown, calling James a cheater, but the flower he wears is discovered to be an onion that helps his eyes water, resulting in both competitors being disqualified for cheating. James and Max reconcile as Mr. McFly laments that he still can't win, and thanks to this, he wins the prize himself and mocks Smooth Jason, saying "Cry on this one, Smooth Jason".
7	7	"Behind Frenemy Lines"	Jouchelle Miranda	Valencia Parker	October 7, 2022
As James and Max enter the RV at the top of Sagu, Max asks if Echo has found a place to live yet. James reveals he's allowing Echo to live there. They enter to find the place a wreck with trash everywhere, as Echo eats snacks and plays a video game. James is unable to tell her how he feels, leading to him becoming incredibly passive-aggressive. James claims Sagu is now a protected species, causing Echo to move into James' house, much to his chagrin. Echo begins to unintentionally irritate James by eating his favorite donuts, throwing her stuff everywhere, interrupting his favorite show and moving into his room. James and Echo get into a fight, leading to James confessing he lied and finally telling Echo how he feels. Realizing her mistakes, Echo agrees to clean up her mess and the two make up.
8	8	"Pillow Fight Club"	Jouchelle Miranda	Darin Henry	October 7, 2022
At the advice of Dr. Bolster, the parents of Dirt decide to ban all risky activities, preventing the kids from releasing their energy through play, causing Max to rage out from being unable to destress. James, Max and Echo decide to have pillow fights in secret in order to have an outlet. They soon decide to bring the other kids into the group and start an underground pillow fight club in the RV. Unfortunately, Max's parents eventually discover his involvement and take him to Dr. Bolster's laboratory, where he is held captive. James and Echo assemble a squad called "Pillow Team Six" to rescue him from the lab. Using their pillow-fighting skills, they infiltrate the lab and reach the area where Max is being held. There, they are confronted by their parents and Dr. Bolster. Before they are captured, James throws his special pillow to break the glass suspension tank where Max is being held, freeing him. Max, now enraged from having been unable to destress causing him to turn into a Hulk-like monster, starts destroying the lab and attacking Dr. Bolster and his guards. The squad fights Max with their pillows in order to make him calm down. Their parents, having watched the situation unfold, decide to abandon Dr. Bolster's advice and join in the pillow fight.
9	9	"Grandma's Boy"	Chelsea Ker	Kathleen Chen & Brian Polk	October 7, 2022
James is playing video games when he gets a present from his grandmother, which he is disappointed to find is a hoop with a stick, the same thing he always gets from her. He decides to find where she lives and goes to her apartment to tell her what he really wants. When he enters the apartment, he is shocked to see a robotic 3D printer named "Grand-Ma", who tells him he doesn't actually have a grandmother, and his parents asked her to print him presents. However, they did not give her any information about James, so she could only print a default gift. James takes her to a walk so she can get to know him and what he likes and dislikes; he shows her that he likes movies, statues and kites, and dislikes loud music and uncomfortable benches. They later get in trouble with Officer Roxanne and are chased. Grand-Ma's power cord runs out of length and they are cornered by Roxanne, but James presses the button that retracts the cord and they both escape. Back at the apartment, Grand-Ma prints a mini-statue of James with a kite and a movie projector and makes a joke about Bob Awman's bench, which Max does not find funny.
10	10	"Blood Excuse"	Jouchelle Miranda	Nick Lopez	October 7, 2022
In gym class, James' gym coach, Doctor Squats, tells the whole class that they will be doing squat frogs for gym class, which James despises because he thinks that they don't have any real life value. Mr. McFly comes into the gym and reminds Doctor Squats that it's blood drive day. Doctor Squats gives everyone two options: stay and do squat frogs, or they can go to the nurse and donate blood. James is the only one that leaves. He realizes that he can use this as an excuse to get out of gym, and so he donates so much blood that by the time the week ends, he has donated to the point that he looks like a senior. When Echo and Max are getting ice cream, James appears and upon the sight of him by the cashier, the ice cream which was supposed to be around 70 dollars gets reduced to two dollars because of the senior discount. After that, Echo and Max go on a shopping spree with James and buy things using his senior discount. After that, James slows down because of his deteriorating body, and he ultimately ends up in a retirement home. He enjoys it and decides to stay. Later, Echo and Max visit him. When it's time to play bingo, Echo shouts "bingo" at the first ball to get snacks thrown at her, which she happily eats. The bingo announcer recognizes Max and then recognizes James, and then they realize that he is in fact Smooth Jason. Smooth Jason reveals his career was ruined following the events of "Emo Like the Wolfstank", but he discovered a new career by donating blood, and so became "Wrinkly Jason". Wrinkly Jason proceeds to fight James; Echo and Max try to join the fight, but visiting hours end and they are kicked out. At one point, James traps Wrinkly Jason in a woolly blanket, but Wrinkly Jason makes the bingo cage fall and nearly crush the elders. James intervenes and does a successful squat frog to stop the bingo cage. The sudden exertion makes him look like his old, young self again, and he gets kicked out. When he gets back to school, Doctor Squats announces that they will be doing push-ups. James complains again, but is forced to do them anyway while Echo reveals she also donated blood to look old.
11	11	"Almost Home Alone"	Annisa Adjani	Darin Henry	October 7, 2022
In a parody of Home Alone, James wakes up at 8:15, almost late for school, but is too late and his parents drive off without him. He decides to take the day off and tries to have fun, but a finicky salesman named Byron Sellers repeatedly attempts to sell him a state-of-the-art security system and makes James work on his day off to keep him at bay, setting up traps related to school subjects like Science, Math, P.E, history, etc. James eventually gives up and buys Sellers' product, but it turns out it is a scam because James did not read the fine print that instantly transfers ownership of the house to Sellers as payment. The security system attacks James, but James again uses strategies from all his school subjects (and Max's fire poker) to destroy it. However, just when James is about to return to his original plans, his parents return, now angry because the house was nearly destroyed in the previous struggle. James confesses everything that happened, but his dad said that it was Saturday the whole time and they make him clean up the house.
12	12	"Nugget Nonsense"	Annisa Adjani	Nick Lopez	October 7, 2022
When James wants Echo to try Dino Nuggets at Foodball Joe's, the latter says he's too old to order from the kids' menu. James protests, but the manager kicks him, Max and Echo out for not ordering. When Echo pays a kid to get the nuggets for them, the kid scams her by taking most of the nuggets for herself. After this, James suggests going to Dirt's lab to attempt to clone more nuggets. Max presses all the buttons on the machine and accidentally brings the nuggets to life, and they attack, becoming giants due to somehow having been mixed with Max's DNA. After a long battle, they stop the nuggets when they attack Foodball Joe's with a giant Foodball Supreme in a parody of the extinction of the dinosaurs, destroying it in the process and allowing the three to finally enjoy the nuggets that have returned to normal. When James and Max mention Toasty after Echo asks them what other things they brought to life, Echo realizes that they were the ones responsible for the processed food-less future, since Toasty went on to start a rebellion of appliances and take over the world. She urges them to help her stop Toasty before it's too late, but James blows caution to the wind since he still doesn't believe that she is from the future. Meanwhile, Toasty has retreated back to the bread factory to plan his revenge.

=== Season 2 (2023) ===
No. overall	No. in season	Title	Directed by	Written by	Original release date
13	1	"The Show Mustn't Go On"	Annisa Adjani	Nick Lopez	February 24, 2023
After watching a biographical musical about the Statue of Liberty, James expresses dislike at it and, to prove his point that people will like anything with the right hype, starts a bet with Echo to create a musical of his own. Basing his musical on Benjamin Franklin and his kite experiment, James (going under the alias Biff Granwell Bonanza) is overcome with his "genius" to the point where he becomes the main and only star of the musical. Although the theater is packed on the day of the musical, the audience ends up seeing it as a comedy and walk off to watch the Statue of Liberty musical again. James, who blew all his money on the musical, ends up having his teeth extracted by Echo as payment for the bet.
14	2	"Partners"	Annisa Adjani	Jennifer Burton & Darin Henry	February 24, 2023
Mr. McFly starts a class experiment where pairs of students take care of a baby (in the form of a bag of flour), promising a pizza party as a prize. Despite James wanting to work with Max, the latter bails on him due to fear of messing up the task - as a result, James is paired with a slug named Irma, who mishandles the baby, and Max is paired with a student named Acorn. After Irma leaves him for Stuart, James attempts to raise the baby by himself, impressing Max. However, a short blackout ensues, during which Max and Acorn's baby is destroyed. Although James is blamed for the baby's "death", the class finds out that the pizza boxes Mr. McFly had prepared were empty - unable to afford a pizza party, Mr. McFly destroyed Max and Acorn's baby after Max left James, whom McFly thought he could rely on, to ensure that the class fails. He apologizes and uses all of his money to hold a pizza party for the class, during which James forgives Acorn and James and Max's friendship is renewed.
15	3	"School Poolers"	Jouchelle Miranda	Darin Henry	February 24, 2023
After missing the school bus, James and Max find an abandoned golf cart. Naming it Dumpy, they let their classmates hitch rides on the golf cart through a "school pool" system, only to soon grow tired due to increasing demands. The next day, while attempting to tell their classmates the school pool is cancelled, Stuart arrives in a buggy and James challenges him to a race. While stealing Echo's pulse generator that she has created to defend them from Toasty to boost Dumpy's power, James injures his foot and Max ends up driving Dumpy during the race. Although the pulse generator helps them win, Dumpy crashes and is destroyed, causing James and Max to start riding the school bus again; despite that, they are relieved to see Stuart suffering with his own school pool system.
16	4	"Body Swap"	Jouchelle Miranda	Megan Gonzalez	February 24, 2023
When James stands up to Stuart for bullying Mr. McFly, Stuart invites him to a fight after school. An anxious James attempts to use Echo's body swap technology to make Max switch bodies with Echo, although Echo ends up distracted by food. James soon finds out that Max switched bodies with Mr. McFly, who is now in Echo's body. James brings Mr. McFly to Stuart's fight, only to find out that Stuart wasn't arranging a fight against James - instead, Stuart wanted to team up with James to fight some girl scouts he angered. Mr. McFly flees from the battle and James and Stuart are beat up by the girl scouts. After the battle, James restores everyone back to their own bodies and finds out he has detention for fighting. In retaliation, James switches bodies with Echo, much to her dismay.
17	5	"The Class Act"	Chelsea Ker	Reese Harvey	February 24, 2023
Revolted by teachers eating snacks confiscated from students, James organizes a heist with Max to steal the snacks back from the teachers' lounge. However, during the heist, James is mistaken for a substitute teacher due to a fake mustache accidentally created by a stain of chocolate milk. He is sent to take care of a kindergarten class, and impressed by his tactics of calming down the class, Principal Loudspeaker makes him "Teacher of the Month". A jealous Mr. McFly sends Stuart to James' class, and despite Stuart causing trouble at first, James successfully manages to get Stuart on his side after telling him about the confiscated snacks. He starts another heist involving Stuart and Max, but gets caught. James confronts Mr. McFly, resulting in a touched Principal Loudspeaker lifting the ban on snacks. Echo then arrives to fly James away from the school.
18	6	"Moral Report"	Chelsea Ker	Pang-ni L. Vogt & Aaron Vaccaro	February 24, 2023
James, obsessed with a maze on a cereal box, expresses his disdain for oral reports. For a class assignment, he makes one up about Dirt's secret treasure and uses the cereal box's maze as a reference. He ends up causing Mr. McFly, and soon most of Dirt, to start a treasure hunt. While planting fake treasure with Max, James finds a real treasure chest with gold inside. However, Captain Fibeard, the cereal's mascot, chases them. He and the rest of Dirt corner James and Max on the edge of a cliff, causing James to confess about the treasure being made up. Captain Fibeard is revealed to be Mr. McFly, who was aware of James' made-up report due to him liking the same cereal brand. James is given a perfect score for the confession (which ended up serving as an oral report), and he and Max head home while Mr. McFly is cornered for assisting James' lie.
19	7	"Mayor Max"	Annisa Adjani	Anna Salinas	February 24, 2023
James, Max, and Echo are disappointed to find the fireworks festival is cancelled, and head to the mayor's office to protest. There, they learn that the mayor is a dog named Snuffles, who refuses to approve the festival, due to the fact that dogs find fireworks scary. James and Max end up running a mayoral campaign for the latter, successfully overthrowing Snuffles. However, Max, seemingly greedy with power, starts acting like a dictator and refuses to approve the festival, causing James to attempt to conspire with Snuffles to ruin Max's reputation by revealing his secret. Instead, James finds out that Max was planning a firework festival all along using Dirt's rarely-used missile defense system. Snuffles, wanting to assassinate Max, uses a satellite's laser to attack; in retaliation, James directs the missiles to the satellite, successfully stopping Snuffles' attack while making fireworks that impress Dirt's citizens, although half of the Moon is destroyed in the process. Elsewhere, at the bread factory, Toasty attaches himself to a robotic body he created, planning revenge on James and Max.
20	8	"Toasty's Goodbye"	Chelsea Ker	James Rallison, Ethan Banville & Carl Faruolo	February 24, 2023
Toasty, who has aged into a teen, learnt to talk, and chose the name Declan, attacks Dirt and confronts James and Max. James attempts to bring back Declan as a son again, and it works out well until Declan remembers his original intention to use him to create the perfect toast when they attempt to serve him breakfast, and then plans to bring all appliances to life. After Declan flees, James and Max read a toaster manual, learning that Declan's weakness comes in the form of a round object. While gathering round objects around the city, they are ambushed by Declan, who is joined by other appliances brought alive through the power of his smart chip, and a fight ensues. Echo is forced to join James and Max in the fight after Declan destroys the food she was collecting. They soon find out that bagels are Declan's weaknesses, and corner him at the bread factory. Declan ends up creating the "perfect" toast during a confrontation and James quickly feeds it to Declan in a last-ditch attempt before he can annihilate him, making him change his ways and swear to focus on making the perfect toast for the world, once again accepting the name Toasty. Before he can do so, though, Max kills him with a bagel anyways despite Toasty's change of heart. James and Max, apparently having not learned their lesson, then attach Toasty's memory card to a waffle maker, and take it in as their son instead, seemingly re-causing the same chaos that Toasty would have caused, which is proven when another person from the future named Harmony appears, but Echo kicks him back in the portal for later, saying she hates spoilers.
