= Phoenix-bot Phoenix King =

Phoenix King
- Hangul: 불사조 로보트 피닉스킹
- Hanja: 不死鳥 로보트 피닉스킹
- RR: Bulsajo roboteu Pinikseuking
- MR: Pulsajo robot'ŭ P'iniksŭk'ing
- Directed by: Jeong Su-yong
- Written by: Lim Woong-sun
- Produced by: Choe Deok-su; An Bong-sik
- Cinematography: Kim Jong-seok
- Edited by: Ree Kyoung-ja
- Music by: Jeong Min-seob
- Release date: January 20, 1984
- Running time: 67 minutes
- Country: South Korea
- Language: Korean

Phoenix King (Korean: 불사조 로보트 피닉스킹; RR: Bulsajo roboteu Pinikseuking) is a South Korean animated feature film. It was later dubbed into English and released in America and Europe as Defenders of Space and parts of its footage was used to create Space Thunder Kids. The small image of the movie poster depicts a toy version of Phoenix King that was released.

Phoenix King is identical to a Diaclone toy No.10 Fire Engine, that later became Inferno of the Transformers. This is the earliest animated version of said toy.

== Criticism ==
The film is infamous for copying designs from numerous Super Robot Series in Japan, especially Mazinger Z, Ippatsuman, Space Cruiser Yamato, Mobile Suit Gundam and many of Leiji Matsumoto's works.
