= Video Warrior Laserion =

Japanese anime television series

- Official DVD cover

ビデオ戦士レザリオン (Bideo Senshi Rezarion)
- Genre: Action, adventure, Mecha, science fiction Cyberpunk
- Created by: Saburō Yatsude
- Anime television series
- Directed by: Kozo Morishita
- Music by: Michiaki Watanabe
- Studio: Toei Animation
- Licensed by: NA: Discotek Media
- Original network: TBS
- Original run: March 4, 1984 – February 3, 1985
- Episodes: 45

Video Warrior Laserion (Japanese: ビデオ戦士レザリオン, Hepburn: Bideo Senshi Rezarion) is a Japanese anime television series animated by Toei Animation. It aired on TBS from March 4, 1984, to February 3, 1985, with a total of 45 episodes. It is also referred to as Rezarion, Laserion and its literal translation Video Senshi Laserion. It was broadcast in Latin America as El Super Lasser.

In South Korea, a pirated version was made based on the Japanese footage and aired under the title Video Ranger 007.

== Overview ==
=== Story ===
The anime is set in the future where the Earth is unified under a world government called the Earth Federation; and is centered on young middle school student Takashi Katori and his classmate/best friend/love interest, Olivia Lawrence. Takashi, who began as a mere online game fan, developed a small virtual world with his friend David from New York City, in which they played their robot combat game. They would play by sending data to each other using satellite technology. One day while they were playing, a scientific experiment using the same satellite was being conducted involving teleporting an American plane from New York to Japan. In a freak accident caused by an explosion during a rebellion by people of the moon who attacked Earth, the plane that was converted into digital information was sent to the virtual world while Takashi's robot information was rematerialized into a real robot.

Takashi was arrested, but later the Earth Government discovered that Dr. Godheim, an evil, broken-hearted genius scientist from the Moon (now a sort of abandoned colony with restricted access) was behind the revolt. The government forces Takashi to pilot the virtual robot Laserion and protect the Earth alongside robot pilots Sarah and Charles and their G1 and G2 robots.

Soon things change, due to the entry of an extraterrestrial named Erefan. He has been captured by the Earth forces and brought in to answer their questions about who he is, and what kind of mission he was carrying. But Erefan proves he is benevolent, somehow refusing to talk about his past. But Olivia with her kindness and intellect helps him to express his suppressed recollections, the way was her encouragement to him to draw on a notebook.

It's the arrival of the extraterrestrial Jack Empire makes all things very complicated (episode 26), Erefan reveals he knows them, and a lot about their evil thinking, tactics and goals. Plus he was dragged to the pits, he witnessed their cruelty, and the Jack prime minister in the Hall of Throne. The specific notebook (containing his drawings) where the Jacks are illustrated about their appearances, mecha, and behavior. Everyone sees these images: Blueheim, General Sylvester, Takashi, Olivia, Charles Danner, and Sarah see what he had experienced, thus they realizing the dire danger the Jacks bring. So he enters the Earth mecha forces (particularly on the good side of Takashi, Charles, and Sarah) to help out the people of Earth against the Jacks as the pilot of the newly made G5 robot.

For Takashi as well, the war against the Jacks becomes personal as he and Olivia have fallen in love, only for her father Steve (who has been brainwashed through torture into becoming a Jack minion) to take her away and effectively let her be kidnapped by the Jacks. From Episodes 34 to 42 Takashi and Olivia are thus separated. Takashi follows the Jacks and the Lawrences to Kyoto, then to Africa (the jungles of East Africa and then the Sahara Desert, where Sahara's sister Sofia attempts to help them by blowing up the Jacks' base, only for them to move toward the Moon, as well as an attempt by Olivia to escape with her father, only to be thwarted by Gario, pulled in by her brainwashed father and locked up in a cell in the Jacks' fortress, separating them again). In Episode 42, seeing how Takashi's fury is making Laserion destroy their base and lose a lot of robots, Gario lets her go over Jack grunts' orders and they are reunited.

After several skirmishes and intense fights between Earth and Jack forces (including an ultimate duel between Takashi and Gario on their robots) the Earthlings win the war on the moon and finally rescue all the hostages remaining, including Steve, who is last seen recovering with his daughter's help. Erefan with his space craft in full capacity, thanks to the efforts of the scientists, bids farewell to his Earth friends, and departs for his home world in episode 45.

== Staff ==
The series was planned by Itaru Orita and Hiroshi Kominato (episodes 1–23), and Susumu Yoshikawa (episodes 24–45), based on an original concept by Saburo Yatsude. Music was composed by Michiaki Watanabe, with theme songs written by Chuumei Watanabe; the opening theme "Video Senshi Laserion" was performed by Takayuki Miyauchi, and the ending theme "Heartful Hotline" was performed by Kumiko Kaori. Character drafts were provided by Shinji Imura, with character design by Hideyuki Motohashi, and mechanical design by Kamio Ohara (Kaname Production), Akira Hio, and Koichi Ohata. Planning cooperation was provided by Momiji Akino and Satoshi Konishi (Y&K). Art settings were handled by Fumihiro Uchikawa, with Tokiji Kabuki in charge of production. The series was chief-directed by Kozo Morishita and produced by Toei Animation and Asatsu-DK.

== Characters ==
=== Main protagonists ===
Japanese name	English name	Voices by
Takashi Katori (香取敬, Katori Takashi)	Takashi Katori	Tōru Furuya
Olivia Lawrence (オリビア・ローレンス, Oribia Rōrensu)	Olivia Lawrence	Keiko Han

=== Earth Federation and other allies ===
Japanese name	English name	Voices by
Sahara (サハラ, Sahara)	Sarah	Eiko Hisamura
Sylvester (シルベスタ, Sirubesutaa)	General Sylvester	Keiichi Noda
Blueheim (ブルーハイム, Burūhaimu)	Dr. Blueheim	Masaya Taki
Kensuke Katori (香取研介, Katori Kensuke)	Kensuke Katori	Eiji Kanie
Yoko Katori (香取容子, Katori Yōko)	Yoko Katori	Eiko Hisamura
Monroe (モンロー, Monrō)	Monroe	Yoko Kawanami
Charles Danner (チャールズ・ダナー, Chāruzu Danā)	Charles Danner	Norio Wakamoto
David (デビット, Debitto)	David	Yoku Shioya
Steve Lawrence (スチーブ・ローレンス, Suchību Rōrensu)	Steve Lawrence	Kōji Yada
Elefan (エレファン, Erefan)	Elephan	Michitaka Kobayashi

=== Rebel Army ===
Japanese name	English name	Voices by
Godheid (ゴッドハイド, Goddo Haido)	Professor Godheid	Eiji Kanie
Inspire (インスパイア, Insupaia)	Inspire	Katsuji Mori
Eric Sid (エリック・シッド, Erikku Shiddo)	Eric Sid	Michitaka Kobayashi
Katie (ケティ, Keti)	Katie Sid	Masako Katsuki
Rudolf (ルドルフ, Rudorufu)	Rudolf	Banjō Ginga

=== Jack Empire (ジャーク帝国, Jāku Teikoku) ===
Japanese name	English name	Voices by
Leader (Note: The term sōtō (総統) is equivalent to Führer in Nazi Germany or Duce in Fascist Italy) Prominence (プロミネンス総統, Purominensu Sōtō)	Prominence	Masaya Taki
Gario (ギャリオ, Gyario)	Gario	Katsuji Mori
Geppler (ゲプラー参謀, Gepurā Sanbō)	Officer Geppler	Kōji Yada
Ganymede (ガニメデ, Ganimede)	Ganymede	Norio Wakamoto
Io (イオ, Io)	Io	Mika Ishizawa
Callisto (カリスト, Karisto)	Callisto	Kōzō Shioya
Jack Emperor (ジャーク大帝, Jāku Taitei)	Emperor of the Jack	Eiji Kanie

== Episodes ==
Episode titles	Directed by	Written by
1. My Dream Robot Game	Kozo Morishita	Akiyoshi Sakai
2. Fleeing David	Hideki Takayama; Keiji Namisato	Takeshi Shudo
3. Don't Cry, Mother	Masao Ito	Yoshiharu Tomita
4. Don't Let The Death Flower Blossom	Toshihiko Arisako	Keiji Kubota
5. Letter From The Moon	Directed by : Hiromichi Matano; Storyboarded by : Masamune Ochiai	Katsuhisa Nakao
6. Foe? Friend? UFO??	Shigeyasu Yamauchi	Katsuhisa Nakao
7. Friendship Melody	Masao Ito	Keiji Kubota
8. Powerful Enemy! Eric Sid!	Kozo Morishita; Keiji Namisato	Hiroshi Okawa
9. Input To Victory	Directed by : Hiromichi Matano; Storyboarded by : Kazuhiro Ochi	Yoshiaki Ishikawa
10. The Fragrance Whose Peace Is Sweet	Toshihiko Arisako	Keiji Kubota
11. Demon's Birthday	Shigeyasu Yamauchi	Tadashi Matsui
12. So Long, Friend of Thermal Sand	Keiji Namisato	Keiji Kubota
13. Holiday War	Kozo Morishita	Takeshi Shudo
14. Running Olivia	Directed by : Toshihiko Arisako; Storyboarded by : Kazuhiro Ochi	Haruya Yamazaki
15. Fleeing Victory	Directed by : Shigeyasu Yamauchi; Storyboarded by : Kozo Morishita	Katsuhisa Nakao
16. The Nervous Reunion	Tadao Okubo	Keiji Kubota
17. Mystery of Sid's Disappearance	Toshihiko Arisako	Keiji Kubota
18. Hello, Transfer Student	Shigeyasu Yamauchi	Yuho Hanazono
19. Harapeko War	Hiromichi Matano	Keiji Kubota
20. Black Cloud of Stealth	Directed by : Toshihiko Arisako; Storyboarded by : Kazuhiro Ochi	Haruya Yamazaki
21. Special Training For Cover!!	Directed by : Keiji Namisato; Storyboarded by : Johei Matsura	Akiyoshi Sakai
22. Laserion Seizure Plan	Toshihiko Arisako	Haruya Yamazaki
23. When Mars Is Bitten	Shigeyasu Yamauchi	Shozo Uehara
24. At That Time, Father's Voice...	Keiji Namisato	Shozo Uehara
25. Rebels on the Spacecraft	Johei Matsura	Shozo Uehara
26. The Approaching Jack Empire	Directed by : Keiji Namisato; Storyboarded by : Yasuo Yamayoshi	Shozo Uehara
27. Death Match of 12 Hours	Hiromichi Matano	Shozo Uehara
28. Song of Love For Victory	Shigeyasu Yamauchi	Shozo Uehara
29. The Twin Brothers of Illusion	Directed by : Keiji Namisato; Storyboarded by : Nobutaka Nishizawa	Haruya Yamazaki
30. Day of Hawaii Battle	Directed by : Masahiro Hosoda; Storyboarded by : Tomoharu Katsumata	Haruya Yamazaki
31. A Solitary Attack	Toshihiko Arisako	Haruya Yamazaki
32. Desperate Defense	Shigeyasu Yamauchi	Haruya Yamazaki
33. Great Empire Appears	Masao Ito	Shozo Uehara
34. Father Who Returns From The Moon	Directed by : Masahiro Hosoda; Storyboarded by : Kozo Morishita	Shozo Uehara
35. Dream of the Illusive Monk	Toshihiko Arisako	Shozo Uehara
36. Fortress in Savanna	Directed by : Keiji Namisato; Storyboarded by : Kazuhiro Ochi	Shozo Uehara
37. The Friendship Which Burns in the Desert	Shigeyasu Yamauchi	Shozo Uehara
38. Golden Pyramid	Masao Ito	Haruya Yamazaki
39. Emperor Jack, Move!!	Toshihiko Arisako	Haruya Yamazaki
40. Olivia Rescue Mission	Directed by : Keiji Namisato; Storyboarded by : Kazuhiro Ochi	Haruya Yamazaki
41. The Desperate 380,000 Kilometres	Directed by : Masahiro Hosoda; Storyboarded by : Kozo Morishita	Haruya Yamazaki
42. Life Or Death Escape	Shigeyasu Yamauchi	Haruya Yamazaki
43. The Emperor, Arrival At The Moon	Directed by : Masahiro Hosoda; Storyboarded by : Tomoharu Katsumata	Shozo Uehara
44. Rebellion	Directed by : Keiji Namisato; Storyboarded by : Tomoharu Katsumata	Shozo Uehara
45. Final Countdown	Toshihiko Arisako	Shozo Uehara

== Media ==
Video Warrior Laserion officially received its first release on DVD on March 11, 2020, in two volumes with a retail price of 22,000 yen (US$202). Volume 1 covered episodes 1-22, while volume 2 covered episodes 23–45.

The series was released on Blu-ray by Discotek Media in 2021.
