= Kazuko Nakamura =

Chinese-Japanese animator

- 中村和子
- Born: Kazuko Kato; April 1, 1933; Kwantung Leased Territory
- Died: August 3, 2019
- Other names: Kazuko Anami; Wako-san
- Citizenship: Japan
- Education: Joshibi University of Art and Design
- Occupation: Animator

Kazuko Nakamura (中村和子, Nakamura Kazuko; April 1, 1933 – August 3, 2019) was a Chinese-born Japanese animator. Nakamura has worked on Princess Knight, A Thousand and One Nights and Cleopatra.

== Early life and education ==
Kazuko Nakamura was born in Manchuria, She began interested with arts from an early age and since there were no art schools in Manchuria, she intended to go to an art school in the mainland in the future. At the age of 12, she returned to Yamaguchi Prefecture to go to Yamaguchi Prefectural Ube High School and graduate there. After graduated from Yamaguchi Prefectural Ube High School, she entered Joshibi University of Art and Design. During there, she saw a French animated film The King and the Mockingbird and became interested in animators.

== Career and death ==
Nakamura was a pioneer of animation at a time when female animators weren't treated the same as their male counterparts and not given the same opportunities. After graduating from Joshibi University of Art and Design, she started working at Toei Douga in 1956. She soon transferred to Mushi Production in 1960 where she became the first female animation supervisor for an entire television series, working on the first shoujo anime Princess Knight. Nakamura then worked on the animation for the trilogy of adult films Animerama, especially on A Thousand and One Nights and Cleopatra. She was known for designing the female characters she worked on authentic in their femininity, devoid of the over-sexualization often created by male animators. Nakamura was would remain one of Osamu Tezuka go-to animators.

On August 3, 2019, she died at the age of 86. Nakamura's family and friends held a private funeral about her. In the 2020 Tokyo Anime Award Festival, Kazuko Nakamura was honored for Hakujaden.

== Works ==
Year	Title	Company
1963-1966	Astro Boy	Mushi Production
1965-1966	Wonder Three	Mushi Production
1967-1968	Princess Knight	Mushi Production
1971	Andersen Monogatari	Mushi Production
1971-1972	Marvelous Melmo	Tezuka Productions
1976-1994	Manga Japan's Old Story	Group Track
1978	Thumbelina	Toei Company
1983-1984	Fushigi no Kuni no Alice	Nippon Animation
