= List of Osamu Tezuka anime =

This is a list of Osamu Tezuka's notable anime work in chronological order. Some of the works have been done after Tezuka's death in February 1989.

This list of anime includes all those listed on Tezuka's official site, as well as others that are directly based on his work, but not listed on the site yet. The English translations of the names used are from the original names found on the official Osamu Tezuka website.

== Film ==
Year	Title	Notes
1960	Journey to the West	
1962	Arabian Nights: The Adventures of Sinbad	
1963	Doggie March	Wrote the original story
1964	Astro Boy: The Brave in Space	
1966	Kimba the White Lion	
1969	A Thousand and One Nights	First film in the Animerama series.
1970	Cleopatra	Second film in the Animerama series.
1970	The Kindly Lion	
1973	Belladonna of Sadness	Third and final film in the Animerama series.
1978	The Phoenix: Chapter of Dawn	Contains both live-action and animation.
1978	World Masterpiece Fairy Tales: Princess Thumbelina	Tezuka provided the character designs.
1979	Triton of the Sea	
1980	Phoenix 2772	
1981	Fantastic Adventures of Unico, The	
1983	Unico in the Island of Magic	
1990	The Film is Alive	
1991	Adachi-Ga Hara	
1996	Black Jack: The Movie	
1997	Jungle Emperor Leo	
1999	Neo Faust	Incomplete
2001	Metropolis	Based on the manga of the same name
2005	Black Jack: The Two Doctors of Darkness	
2009	Astro Boy	Imagi Animation Studios & Summit Entertainment
2011	Buddha	
2026	The Ribbon Hero	

=== Pilot film ===
Year	Title	Notes
1966	Adventures of the Monkey King	
1966	Princess Knight	
1967	Flying Ben	
1968	Dororo	
1968	Gum Gum Punch	
1968	Norman	
1968	Zero-Man	
1971	Blue Triton	
1979	Unico: Black Cloud, White Feather	
1987	Brave Fire S09	

=== Experimental film ===
Year	Title	Notes
	Party	Incomplete
1962	Male	
1962	Tales of a Street Corner	
1964	Memory	
1964	Mermaid	
1965	Cigarettes and Ashes	
1965	Drop, The	
1966	Pictures at an Exhibition	
1968	Genesis	
1984	Jumping	
1985	Broken Down Film	
1987	Legend of the Forest, Part I	
1987	Muramasa	
1987	Push	
1988	Self-Portrait	
1995	Mosquito	Incomplete

=== PR film ===
Year	Title	Notes
1970	Misuke in the Land of Ice	
1970	Once Upon a Time	
1971	Misuke in Southern	
1977	Tenguri, the Boy of the Plains	
1987	Okazaki City in 70 Years	

=== Tezuka Osamu World film ===
Year	Title	Notes
1996	Black Jack: Capital Transfer to Heian	
1999	Princess Knight	
2000	Jungle Emperor: Hon-o-ji	
2001	Astro Boy: Shinsen-gumi	
2001	Unico Special Chapter: Saving Our Fragile Earth	

== OVA ==
Year	Title	Notes
1983	Green Cat, The	
1985	Lunn Flies into the Wind	
1986	Phoenix: Karma Chapter	
1986	Yamataro Comes Back	
1987	Phoenix: Space Chapter	
1987	Phoenix: Yamato Chapter	
1989	Rain Boy	
1991	Symphonic Poem: Jungle Emperor Leo	
1993	Akuemon	
1993	Ambassador Magma	OVA series
1993	Black Jack	OVA series
1995	Essays on Insects	
2000	Black Jack: Child from the Sky	This anime was originally produced as a supplement for, and was included with two volumes of the manga, in the Black Jack Limited Edition Box released in Japan on March 22, 2000.

== Television ==
=== TV series ===
Year	Title	Notes
1963	Astro Boy	
1963	Galaxy Boy Troop	
1964	Big X	Produced by Tokyo Movie.
1965	The Amazing 3	
1965	Jungle Emperor	
1966	New Jungle Emperor, Go Ahead Leo!	
1967	Goku's Great Adventures	
1967	Princess Knight	
1969	Dororo	
1969	The Vampires	Contains both live-action and animation.
1971	Marvelous Melmo	
1972	Triton of the Sea	
1973	Microid S	
1973	Wansa-kun	
1977	Jetter Mars	
1980	Astro Boy	
1982	Don Dracula	
1989	Blue Blink	
1989	Jungle Emperor	
1990	The Three-Eyed One	First project from Tezuka Productions approved after Tezuka's death
1997	In the Beginning: The Bible Stories	Produced from 1984 to 1992; co-production with Radiotelevisione Italiana (Italy)
2000	Tree in the Sun	
2003	Astro Boy	
2003	Black Jack: The 4 Miracles of Life	Miniseries
2004	Black Jack	
2004	Phoenix	
2006	Black Jack 21	
2015	Young Black Jack	
2017	Atom: The Beginning	
2019	Dororo	

=== TV special ===
Year	Title	Notes
1965	New Treasure Island	Based on the manga of the same name; First one-hour animated TV special produced in Japan
1969	Astro Boy vs. the Giants	
1969	Till a City Beneath the Sea Is Built	
1972	Space Journey: The First Dream of Wonder-Kun	

==== Produced for Nippon TV's 24 hour TV Love Saves the Earth charity program ====
Year	Title	Notes
1978	One Million-Year Trip: Bander Book	First two-hour animated TV special produced in Japan
1979	Undersea Super Train: Marine Express	
1980	Fumoon	Based on the manga Nextworld
1981	Bremen 4: Angels in Hell	Based on the fairy tale "Town Musicians of Bremen" by the Brothers Grimm
1983	A Time Slip of 10,000 Years: Prime Rose	Originally conceived and planned first before the manga it was based on was published
1984	Bagi, the Monster of Mighty Nature	
1985	The Prince of Devil Island: The Three-Eyed One	Produced by Toei Animation instead of Tezuka Pro
1986	Galaxy Investigation 2100: Border Planet	
1989	The Tezuka Osamu Story: I Am Son-goku	Tezuka died during production

== See also ==
- List of Osamu Tezuka manga
