= Adult animation by country =

Film animation for adults

The United States and Japan have dominated the adult animation market since the early 1970s, later varied to countries, such as the United Kingdom, China, France, Spain, South Korea, Russia and the Philippines.

== Americas ==
=== Canada ===
Adult animation has slowly moved forward in Canada. From 2002 to 2003, Clone High, a Canadian–American adult animated sitcom, a parody of teen dramas such as Dawson's Creek and Beverly Hills, 90210, first aired in its entirety on Canadian cable network Teletoon at Night between 2002 and 2003, later debuting on MTV. After controversy regarding its depiction of Mahatma Gandhi, which prompted hundreds in India to mount a hunger strike in response, MTV pulled the series, which had been receiving low ratings. Additionally, Clone High attracted mixed reviews from television critics upon its premiere, but it has since received critical acclaim and a cult following. Some critics described it as having a "silly premise" and noted that it was short-lived.

From 2004 to 2007 Tripping the Rift, an American/Canadian adult animated science fiction comedy television series, which aired in Syfy, then airing on channels of other North American and International broadcasters, aired on Space and Teletoon at Night. It also aired in France, Italy, Belgium, Portugal, Sweden, Spain, and Central Europe. In 2008, Anchor Bay released the 75-minute unrated Tripping the Rift: The Movie on DVD on 25 March 2008. The series was described as "strange riff on Star Trek", with one reviewer saying that while the show has "some out-of-date CGI animation," it mixes spoof of sci-fi with political satire and social commentary.

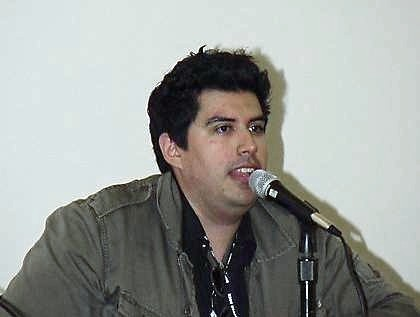
Adam de la Peña at the San Diego Comic Con's Code Monkeys panel in July 2007; Peña is the creator of the Code Monkeys animated series.

From 2007 to 2008 an American animated television program by Adam de la Peña, titled Code Monkeys, which follows the adventures of fictional video game company GameaVision, ran for two seasons, from 2007 to 2008, on G4 and G4 Canada. The series was described as being an "arcade-themed comedy," while having a style of "lude [sic], stoner humour" while having visuals of a distinct flavour.

In 2005 a British–Canadian adult animated series about a British high school in South London, titled Bromwell High, aired on Teletoon at Night in Canada first, then had an incomplete run on Channel 4 in the United Kingdom. It was a co-production between Hat Trick Productions in the UK and Decode Entertainment in Canada. It was originally to be entitled Streatham Hill, but was renamed Bromwell High in January 2005. Streatham Hill is a real London suburb, while Bromwell is fictional. Reviewers stated that it made fun of living in a London suburb while "delivering a surreal and outlandish viewing experience", parodying British culture itself, having simplistic but edgy humour while staying a "wholly original" animation.

In 2016 Secret Path was released, a multimedia storytelling project principally developed by singer-songwriter and writer Gord Downie. Secret Path told the story of Chanie Wenjack, who died at age 12 in 1966 after escaping an Indian residential school in Northern Ontario. The project included an animated television film on the CBC written and directed by Downie, a concept album and concert tour, a graphic novel, and instructional material.

In March 2019 Trailer Park Boys: The Animated Series, a spinoff of the Trailer Park Boys series, began streaming on Netflix. CBR would describe it as "the animated successor to beloved Canadian comedy icons" and stated that any continuation of "this Nova Scotian raunchiness is always appreciated." Later, in July 2020, it was announced that a reboot of the series is in the works at MTV Studios with the original creators Lord, Miller, and Lawrence returning. Specifically, the Adult Animation Unit of ViacomCBS was said to be at work on rebooting shows like Clone High and Beavis and Butt-Head.

In November 2020 Chris Robinson of Cartoon Brew wrote an article about the animation scene in Toronto, Ontario. Within the article, he argued that while Canada has put out fine animation on TV for years, it has "never produced a series" which is just as "timeless and popular" as Family Guy and The Simpsons. He also stated that adult animations tend to be "very Canada-specific" like Corner Gas Animated. However, Robinson quoted George Elliott, president of Elliott Animation, who stated that outside of adult animation, "many Canadian shows have found global success."

=== Chile ===
In 2018 The Wolf House, also known as La Casa Lobo, by filmmakers Cristobal León & Joaquín Cociña, who both work in Santiago de Chile, Chile. premiered. It was described as "a stop-motion tour de force, staged as a single sequence" while having a strong "allegory about Chile's inglorious ties with German."

=== United States ===
In the United States, before the enforcement of the Hays Code, some cartoon shorts contained humour that was aimed at adult audience members rather than children. Following the introduction of the Motion Picture Association of America film rating system, independent animation producers like Ralph Bakshi (known for the 1972 adaptation of Robert Crumb's creation Fritz the Cat) attempted to establish an alternative to mainstream animation. Initially, few animation studios in the United States attempted to produce animation for adult audiences, but later examples of animation produced for adults would gain mainstream attention and success. Adult animation in the United States includes shows with superheroes, sci-fi, and fantasy elements. Some of the most prominent animations with these mature themes include The Simpsons, BoJack Horseman, Futurama, Aqua Teen Hunger Force, Beavis and Butt-Head, Robot Chicken, South Park, Big Mouth, Rick and Morty, Family Guy, American Dad!, Invincible, Smiling friends (American-australian), and Archer, along with other adult animated television series, feature films, and animation in other forms which helped the genre expand over the years.

== Asia ==
=== China ===
For years education in adult animation within China fostered "practical talents" in the country's animation industry. In 2017, the Chinese animated dark comedy film directed by Liu Jian, Have a Nice Day premiered. It was first shown in the main competition for the Golden Bear at the 67th Berlin International Film Festival in February 2017. It is Liu Jian's second feature film, following his debut Piercing I. The film, mostly done by Liu himself, took three years to complete. The film was withdrawn from the Annecy International Animated Film Festival in June 2017 at its producer's demand as it did not have proper governmental clearance to be screened internationally. Strand Releasing distributed the film in US while Memento Films International handled additional territories including the UK, Mexico, Spain, Benelux, Switzerland, Greece, Turkey and Eastern Europe. The film has been licensed to screen in more than 30 countries. In China, the premiere of the film took place at the Pingyao International Film Festival in early November 2017, with a guest appearance by Chinese film director Jia Zhangke, who praised the film as a milestone in Chinese animation. The film won Best Animation Feature at the 54th Golden Horse Awards. The film was later described as revealing a "dark side of China's modernization" and called subversive.

Hong Kong, like the rest of China, has been involved in adult animation for years. One of these animations is the recent film, No.7 Cherry Lane, which has been described as "dense with literary and classic cinema references" and called the first venture by Yonfan into adult animation itself.

=== Iran ===
The French and Iranian film, Persepolis, based on comics of the same name has been described as an "adult-oriented story." The film features various LGBTQ characters. At one point in the film, Marjane Satrapi lives for some time in a communal apartment with eight gay men in Vienna, Austria. Additionally, Marjane's boyfriend Fernando (named Enrique in the comic) reveals to her that he is gay.

=== Japan ===
Adult animation is known in Japan as adult anime (アダルトアニメ, adaruto anime). Anime and manga targeted to young men are called seinen, whereas those targeted to young women are called josei.

Studio Ghibli cofounder Toshio Suzuki remembered that until the end of the 1970s, animation was primarily considered as a medium for families and children. Suzuki said that this changed with the release of Space Battleship Yamato, opening up the range of audiences for anime. Ghibli's Nausicaä of the Valley of the Wind was produced with a more mature audience in mind, and many fellow studios were doing the same thing in the early 1980s. Akira is seen as a pivotal film in the Japanese cyberpunk genre and inspired many adult-oriented cyberpunk anime. James Cameron cited Ghost in the Shell as a source of inspiration for Avatar, and called it "the first truly adult animation film to reach a level of literary and visual excellence." Ghibli movies were spread to a U.S. audience with distributors like GKids. Others stated that anime changed by the "increasing importation of Japanese animated adult erotic fare" beginning in the 1990s.

Animated works of an erotic nature have come to be described in western fandom as hentai, the Japanese word for "perverted", while in Japan they are more likely to be referred to as R-18 anime (18禁アニメ, jūhachikin anime) or erotic anime (エロアニメ, ero anime). Although some associate all anime with sexual content, hentai only makes up a very small portion of the Japanese animation industry. As the result of the misconceptions about Japanese animation, some video stores outside Japan have classified children's anime as for adults only. While the adult animation market exists primarily through direct sales, like mail-orders to customers, and wholesale to speciality shops which cater to animation and comic-book fans, the legal framework in Japan and the United States regarding the regulation of obscene and pornographic material is overall rather similar.

Many video stores have also categorized all adult-oriented animation as "anime", including the works of Bakshi, the French animated film Fantastic Planet, the Canadian animated film Heavy Metal and the HBO television series Todd McFarlane's Spawn. In the case of Spawn, Todd McFarlane directly listed anime as an influence, particularly Katsuhiro Otomo's Akira, and stated his hope that the show would help encourage the rise of adult animation on North American networks. This in part led to the involvement of the Japanese studio Madhouse in the production, in an attempt to "combine" the Eastern and Western styles.

Some of the earliest manga magazines were aimed at adults, and this provided a prime source as the basis for adult anime works. Manga marketed towards adult men are known as seinen, while those marketed towards adult women are known as josei. Weekly Manga Times began publication in 1956, and would be followed by Weekly Manga Goraku (1964), and Manga Action (1967). Anime works based on seinen manga include Berserk, Golden Boy and Tokyo Daigaku Monogatari. In the case of Golden Boy, while it has been positively received by English-language reviewers, it is widely known for its mature content, as the OVA features instances of partial female nudity, orgasms, and female masturbation, and the manga becomes almost pornographic starting in the second volume. On the other hand, reviewers predicted that Tokyo Daigaku Monogatari, otherwise known as Tokyo University Story, would have "sexually-oriented material" but would not be pornographic.

Trailer of A Thousand and One Nights, Animerama's first film and the first erotic animated feature film.

In 1969 Osamu Tezuka and Eiichi Yamamoto released Senya Ichiya Monogatari (千夜一夜物語) the first of a trilogy of animated feature films with much sexual imagery aimed at an adult audience. It was dubbed and released in the United States as A Thousand and One Nights. Osamu Tezuka and Eiichi Yamamoto collaborated on the second film in the Animerama series Kureopatora (クレオパトラ) released in the United States as Cleopatra: Queen of Sex. This film was described by some as a time-travel farce which portrayed Julius Caesar as a "cigar-chomping, American-style politician." The third film Kanashimi no Beradonna (哀しみのベラドンナ) was directed by Eiichi Yamamoto alone. It entered the Berlin International Film Festival but did not achieve commercial success. In addition, mockbusters: Maruti Gekiga, Ukiyoe Senichiya (マル秘劇画 浮世絵千一夜, The first animated film to receive the R-18 in Japan), Do It! Yasuji's Pornorama (ヤスジのポルノラマ やっちまえ!!, based on the erotic gag manga by Yasuji Tanioka) was released, but did not achieve commercial success either, with failure of films like this leaving a big stigma in the animation industry and the movie industry, with adult animation disappearing from the Japanese market until at least the 1980s. The film was also called pornographic, with female staff, most of whom were in their 20s, embarrassed as female genitals appeared frequently during production. The film was also dismissed as "foolish" by Japanese animation researcher Yasushi Watanabe and by movie historian Junichiro Tanaka as a "silly poor piece of writing."

The North American Adult Swim channel has been airing adult-oriented anime series via Toonami on Saturday nights: Cowboy Bebop, FLCL, Ghost in the Shell: Stand Alone Complex, IGPX and Space Dandy. Four of the Japanese TV networks have similar late-night anime blocks: Fuji Television's Noitamina, and Mainichi Broadcasting System's Animeism and Anime Shower.

As for the Noitamina timeslot, it was expanded from half an hour to a full hour in 2010, with Fuji TV and Funimation announcing an agreement that allows Funimation to simulcast series from the noitaminA block in North America within an hour of their airing in Japan. From October 2012 to March 2013, the first season of Psycho-Pass aired on Fuji TV's Noitamina. A writer of The Seahawk noted that while adult animation in the United States is largely comedic, Japanese series like Psycho Pass show a different aspect in the range of adult entertainment.

In 2021 Nick Creamer of Crunchyroll argued that children's animation in Japan can handle almost all the topics which appear in "late-night anime," even exploring them with "more nuance and grace" than those which are "adult-oriented." Later that year, the Association of Japanese Animations stated, in a report, that Japanese animation would be challenged by adult animation in the United States, writing: "Hollywood has finally advanced into the realm overlapping with the adult animation market that had been Japan's monopoly. If this trend shifts into high gear, the existence of Japanese animation may be questioned again."

=== Korea ===
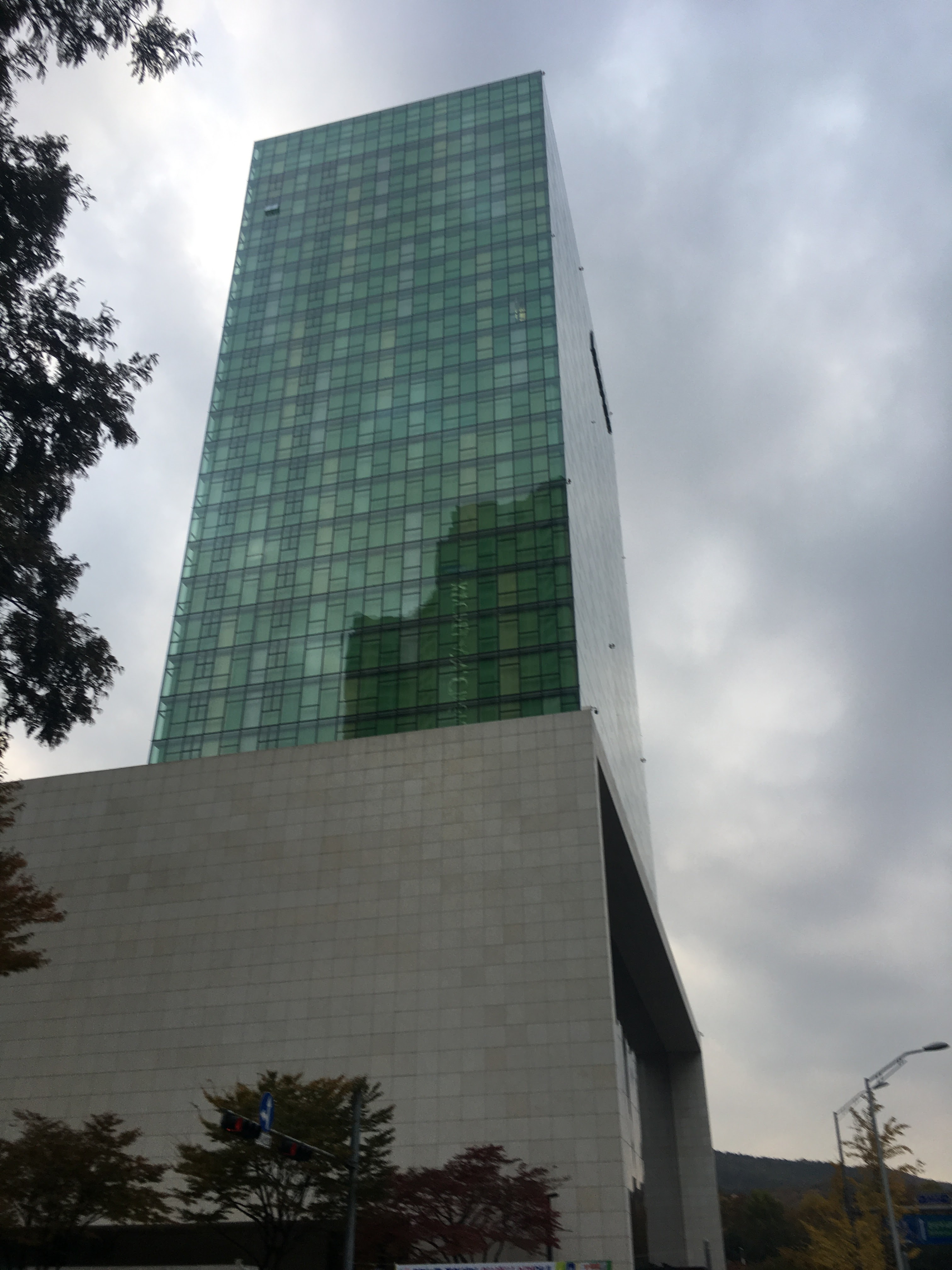
The headquarters of the Naver Corporation, which owns Line Webtoon, has cooperated with Crunchyroll to create animated series.

Adult animation began arising in the 2010s, much like Yeon Sang-ho, known as directing a live-action zombie film Train to Busan, directs his film debut in the 2011 film The King of Pigs, depicts their subject matter such as the realistic portrayal of juvenile delinquency, bullying, violence, and poverty. Yet, he continued to make animation targeted at adults with dark, controversial themes that brutally and incisively explore human nature and social realism. His first film, along with his works, The Fake (2013) and Seoul Station (2016), is much praised for its animation and themes due to his influences by the works of Japanese anime and manga artists, Satoshi Kon and Minoru Furuya.

Another adult animated film Leafie, A Hen into the Wild, was responsible for South Korea's increase in legitimacy in the animation industry.

In November 2020, it was announced that Locus Corporation, founded in 2009, creating many "influential and internationally renowned films," was being rebranded, with a new set of animations, such as Running Man: Revengers, Toemarok, and Yumi's Cells. The CEO of Locus, James Hyungsoon, stated that part of the company's business plan was to produce "top-quality family animated films" while also expanding the "Korean animation industry with teenage and adult-oriented animation," along with series for preschoolers and young kids.

=== Malaysia ===
Malaysia used to be the only country to not have an actual adult animated series, most animated shows, like Upin & Ipin and BoBoiBoy, focused on family entertainment. In 2026, the first ever adult animated series, Kisah Bawah Tanah, was made. The series focused on Malaysian horror folklore.

=== Philippines ===
Adult animation in the Philippines become the largest turning point in the animation industry, ranging from the regime under Martial Law administered by then-President Ferdinand Marcos to the ongoing golden age of the Philippine filmmaking in the 21st century.

== Europe ==
=== Britain ===
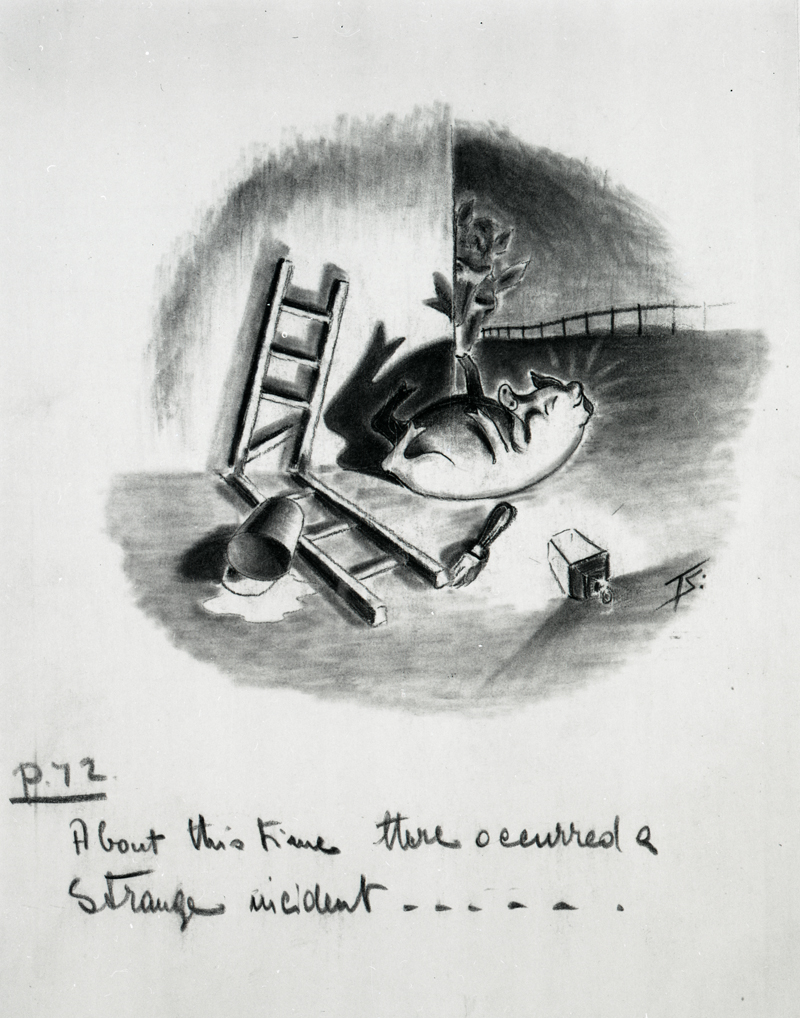
Preliminary drawing for design of Animal Farm strip cartoon commissioned by the British Foreign Office in 1950; Animal Farm was released as a British animated film in 1954 in a production funded, and supported, by the CIA.

In 1954, a British film studio Halas and Batchelor produced an animated adaptation of George Orwell's novel Animal Farm, with funding from the Central Intelligence Agency and film producer Louis de Rochemont. This film is believed to have been one of the earliest examples of British and adult animation, and like the book it is based on, is meant to be a satire of Stalinism with characters serving as analogues to figures from the Russian Revolution of 1917, as argued by Orwell himself, due to his hostility to Stalin and his policies since the 1930s.un conte satirique contre Staline He also described it, in his essay "Why I Write" (1946), as the first book in which he tried, with full consciousness of what he was doing, "to fuse political purpose and artistic purpose into one whole". As it was produced during the Cold War, the film was brought to the silver screen thanks to promotion from the CIA and the Office of Policy Coordination, while it was banned in the Soviet Union, like its source material.

For many years it had been problematic to import films that did not meet the approval of the United States Customs Service. In 1972, the Customs Service refused entry of a short film titled Sinderella, depicting scenes of sexual intercourse between characters based upon Cinderella, Little Red Riding Hood, Puss in Boots, Goldilocks and the Three Bears and Prince Charming. The film was seized as obscene material, and its distributor filed a court case and an appeal in 1974 but lost both.

In England Martin Rosen directed two animated features based on the novels of Richard Adams: Watership Down in 1978, and The Plague Dogs in 1982. Both films deal with adult themes: Watership Down, the negotiation of leadership to organize an exodus away from persecution, and The Plague Dogs on animal testing. For Watership Down, the film has received a mostly positive critical reception, with an 82% 'Fresh' rating on Rotten Tomatoes based on 34 reviews, while the critical consensus on the site says the film is "aimed at adults perhaps more than children" and is a "respectful, beautifully animated adaptation of Richard Adams' beloved book." As for The Plague Dogs, it was praised for its visual style, while others believed that the film was downbeat due to an unhappy ending. Currently the film has a 57% on Rotten Tomatoes based on 7 reviews with an average rating of 7 out of 10.

Pink Floyd – The Wall, an adaptation of Pink Floyd's concept album of the same name, was highly metaphorical and symbolic imagery and sound are present most commonly. The film is mostly driven by music and does not feature much dialogue. The film is best known for its imagery of mental isolation, drug use, war, fascism, dark or disturbing animated sequences, sexual situations, violence and gore. Despite its turbulent production and the creators voicing their discontent about the final product, the film generally received positive reviews and has an established cult following. Reviewers praised the film for its "stunning vision of self-destruction" while others called it "unrelentingly downbeat and at times repulsive" It earned two British Academy Awards: Best Sound for James Guthrie, Eddy Joseph, Clive Winter, Graham Hartstone and Nicholas Le Messurier, and Best Original Song for Waters. and "unremitting in its onslaught upon the senses." Gilmour stated (on the "In the Studio with Redbeard" episodes of The Wall, A Momentary Lapse of Reason and On an Island) that the conflict between him and Waters started with the making of the film. Gilmour also stated in the documentary Behind The Wall (which was aired on the BBC in the UK and VH1 in the US) that "the movie was the less successful telling of The Wall story as opposed to the album and concert versions." Later, although the symbol of the crossed hammers used in the film was not related to any real group, it was adopted by white supremacist group the Hammerskins in the late 1980s. In terms of the animation, even before the original Pink Floyd album was recorded, the intention was to make a film from it. The original plan was for the film to be live footage from the album's tour, together with Gerald Scarfe's animation and extra scenes, and for Waters himself to star. EMI did not intend to make the film, as they did not understand the concept. Later, Alan Parker convinced Waters and Scarfe that the concert footage was too theatrical and that it would jar with the animation and stage live action. After the concert footage was dropped, Seresin left the project and Parker became the sole director.

In 1986 England produced yet another politically themed animation, When the Wind Blows, which recounts a rural English couple's attempt to survive a nearby nuclear attack and maintain a sense of normality in the subsequent fallout. The film stars the voices of John Mills and Peggy Ashcroft as the two main characters and was scored by Roger Waters of Pink Floyd. The film is a hybrid of traditional and stop-motion animation. The characters of Jim and Hilda Bloggs are hand-drawn, but their home and most of the objects in it are real objects that seldom move but are animated with stop-motion when they do. In the United States it was released on Blu-ray on 11 November 2014 by Twilight Time in a limited edition of 3000, and in the United Kingdom, a dual-format release containing both the DVD and Blu-ray version was released on 22 January 2018 by the BFI. Severin Films released another Blu-ray of the movie in the United States through their Severin Kids label on 21 April 2020.

In 2016 Ethel & Ernest was broadcast on television on BBC One. Some critics called it a "placid, exquisitely observed chronicle of an ordinary English marriage."

In November 2020 the Daily Express reported that an adult animated comedy named The Prince was coming soon to HBO Max. They described it as a show which will poke "fun at the British monarchy...lampoon[ing] various royals."

=== Denmark ===
In 2011 the animated fantasy comedy film Ronal the Barbarian, parodies the barbarians and other stereotypes of the sword and sorcery fiction, role-playing games and films such as Conan the Barbarian and the Dungeons & Dragons class, with nods towards the 1980s fantasy boom and its association with traditional heavy metal.

In 2021 Flee, an animated documentary film was based on a true story that follows a refugee named Amin Nawabi, who shares his hidden past for the first time, by fleeing his country to Denmark for his safety. Sommer noted: "I had early development sketches of the main character where he was more stylized." The film had its world premiere at the 2021 Sundance Film Festival on January 28, 2021, where it won the Grand Jury Prize in the World Cinema Documentary section. Film festivals and critics garnered more critical acclaim for its thematic content and depiction of Afghanistan and are considered one of the most highly acclaimed and award-winning animated documentaries since Waltz with Bashir (2008), which results in a spiritual successor. Flee makes history at the Academy Award records, which was selected as the Danish entry for the Academy Award for Best International Feature Film, where it received a nomination, along with nominations in the Best Documentary Feature and Best Animated Feature categories, making it the first PG-13, adult animated, foreign-language, and animated documentary film to be nominated simultaneously. It also received many accolades, mainly for animated and documentary categories including the recipient of Golden Globes, BAFTA and Annie nominations, winning the latter for Best Animated Feature – Independent.

=== Central and Eastern Europe ===
In 2018 Chris the Swiss, a Swiss animated documentary film directed by Anja Kofmel, premiered. It was screened in the Critics' Week section at the 2018 Cannes Film Festival. It was described as a war animation which combines live-action interviews, newsreel animation, and more to focus on the Yugoslav Wars.

Then, in October 2020 Alex Dudok de Wit of Cartoon Brew wrote about the CEE Animation Forum, held virtually from 6 to 8 October, which he called "a seedbed of interesting European animation," noting that six features were pitched to potential partners and buyers, half of which were for families, with the other half being for "older audiences." In the latter was Igi, a Georgian feature produced by Natia Nikolashvili, King Wray, a Romanian part produced by Anton Groves and Damian Groves, and The Black Swallow, a French feature produced by Louis-J Gore. While the Groves brothers and Gore were looking for co-producers, Nikolashvili was looking for "financial and creative partners."

=== France ===
In 1973 Rene Laloux directed La Planète sauvage based on the French science fiction novel Oms en série by Stefan Wul. It has been televised in the United States and United Kingdom as Fantastic Planet, and several DVD editions have been released.

The first foreign animated feature to receive both an X rating and wide distribution in the United States was Tarzoon: Shame of the Jungle, a French-Belgian film. A dubbed version, which featured new dialogue performed by American actors and comedians such as John Belushi, Adolph Caesar, Brian Doyle-Murray, Judy Graubart, Bill Murray and Johnny Weissmuller Jr., received an R rating. According to distributor Stuart S. Shapiro, the X rating hurt the film's distribution, but the dubbed version "took the bite out of the film. It lost its outrageousness." Tarzoon was banned by the New Zealand Board of Censors in 1980.

In July 2018 Balak's independently animated series, Peepoodo & the Super Fuck Friends began airing online on the show's website. The series, produced by French animation company Blackpills, consists of comedic sexual education cartoon shorts for those over the age of 18. It is the second series produced by the animation studio Bobbypills. After a campaign of crowdfunding on Kickstarter, a second season began production.

=== Germany ===
In 1990 Werner – Beinhart!, a German animated film based on the comic book sold 4.9 million tickets, making it the third most successful movie in theatres in Germany in 1990, and one of the highest-grossing German films in the 1990s with a gross of $24 million (€19.7 million). The film contains animated sequences that are embedded in those of the live-action sequences, which form the background story. Between 1996 and 2011, four more animation film adaptations were made based on the Werner comics.

Felidae is a 1994 German adult animated horror/mystery film directed by Michael Schaack, written by Martin Kluger, Stefaan Schieder and Akif Pirinçci, and based on Pirinçci's 1989 novel of the same name. Produced by Trickompany, the film features the voices of Ulrich Tukur, Mario Adorf and Klaus Maria Brandauer. The story centres on the domestic house cat Francis and the grisly feline murders taking place in his new neighbourhood. In a review, Eric Hansen of Variety said the film lacked screen time for the plot, and that it needed more to avoid confusion. Hansen complimented the voices behind Francis and Bluebeard, but criticized Klaus Maria Brandauer's voice-over as a "by-the-numbers performance."

=== Russia ===
Soyuzmultfilm, a Russian animation studio based in Moscow, which was launched in 1936, the studio has produced more than 1,500 cartoons. began specializing in the creation of animated TV series, feature films and short films. The studio made films in a wide variety of genres and art techniques, including stop-motion, hand-drawn, 2D and 3D techniques. This included cartoons for an adult audience like The Signature is Illegible in 1954 by Alexander Ivanov, The Villain with a Sticky Label the same year by Vsevolod Shcherbakov and Boris Stepantsev, and Ballad of a Table in 1955 by Mikhail Kalinin and Roman Davydov. The studio also produced A Miracle-maker in 1957 by Alexander Ivanov, and Familiar Pictures in 1957 by Yevgeny Migunov. The latter film was shot entirely in a way that was innovative for that time when films were done conventionally.

In November 2020 it was announced that Premier, the video platform of Gazprom-Media, and the TV channel 2x2 had begun a partnership which would produce adult animation while "working with well-known Russian and international companies." At least three animated series will then be released in 2021 and 2022. The Director of 2x2, Denis Vsesvyatsky, was quoted as saying that this will open a "new era in the adult animation industry in Russia" as they look for potential partners, while the CEO of Premier, Ivan Grodetsky, described "connoisseurs of adult animation" as a new audience for the platform in an attempt to attract new users. In December 2020, Russian artist Prokopiy Ulyashov, 27, re-imagined The Simpsons, a mature animated series, styling them as "characters from famous Soviet animation series and cartoons."

=== Spain ===
In 2015 Birdboy: The Forgotten Children, a Spanish animated drama-horror coming-of-age film, premiered. It followed the titular character, Birdboy, a shy outcast in a post-apocalyptic society, and Dinky, a teenage mouse runaway fleeing her desolate island home. The series was also described as a film which dissects social ills in Spain in a "funny, sad, sweet, macabre, and surgeon-sharp" manner.

It was later said that Alberto Vázquez, who created Birdboy: The Forgotten Children and later, Homeless Home, was at the forefront of adult animation itself. Also, Birdboy won Best Animated Feature at the 2016 Goya Awards, Vázquez scored a historic win by simultaneously receiving the prize for Best Animated Short (Decorado, which was also honored at Cannes).

In June 2020 a trailer was released for Vazquez's next feature film, Unicorn Wars, which is an adult animated film about the gruesome war between teddy bears and unicorns, or as the teddy bears call them, devils. (Note: His first was Chico and Rita in 2010 after El Sol.)

== Oceania ==
=== Australia ===
Various adult animations have premiered in Australia. In 2001, Canadian-Australian co-production John Callahan's Quads! was produced, a comedy cartoon television series which aired on SBS and Teletoon at Night. In 2016, Working Dog Productions series Pacific Heat, an animated comedy sitcom, was released on The Comedy Channel and Netflix. In 2020, Melbourne animation company Stepmates Studios produced an animated sitcom Regular Old Bogan, which has been described as Australia's answer to South Park and aired on 7mate. It was later released on Tubi in August 2021. Another animated comedy series, YOLO, is an Australian-American co-production that also premiered in 2020 and was created by Michael Cusack, airing on Adult Swim and Stan. It has since been renewed for a further two series. In 2023, comedy sitcom series Koala Man, also from creator and developer Michael Cusack, was released on Hulu and Disney+. Stop-motion animated film Memoir of a Snail, directed by Adam Elliot, premiered in June 2024 and received positive reviews. Other examples include Murder Drones and The Amazing Digital Circus, created by Glitch Productions, which are both available to watch on YouTube.

Family film Combat Wombat, released in October 2020 from the Tales from Sanctuary City franchise, had been described by one critic as an "entertaining and surprisingly adult movie".
