= List of adult animated feature films of the 1970s =

This is a list of adult animated films that were made in the 1970s (1970-1979). These are films intended for a more mature audience than many animated films, both short and feature. They are often distinct from television series or web series.

Fritz the Cat and its sequel were among the first animated films to received X and R by the Motion Picture Association of America.

== List ==
Year	Title	Country	Director	Studio	Technique	Notes
1970	Cleopatra	(Japan)	Osamu Tezuka, Eiichi Yamamoto	Mushi Production	Traditional	
1971	Do It! Yasuji's Pornorama	(Japan)	Takateru Miwa, Shinichiro Takakuwa	Tokyo TV Movie	Traditional	Based on the erotic gag manga by Yasuji Tanioka
1972	Fritz the Cat	(United States)	Ralph Bakshi	Aurica Finance Company, Black Ink, Fritz Productions, Steve Krantz Productions	Traditional	First animated film to receive the X rating in the US
1973	Heavy Traffic	(United States)	Ralph Bakshi	Steve Krantz Productions	Traditional	
1973	Johnny Corncob	(Hungary)	Marcell Jankovics	Pannonia Film Studio	Traditional	First Hungarian animated feature; (Hungarian: Kukorica Jancsi)
1973	Fantastic Planet	(Czechoslovakia) / (France)	René Laloux	Jiří Trnka Studio	Traditional	
1973	King Dick	(Italy)	Gibba		Traditional	(lit. 'Il Nano e la Strega')
1973	Belladonna of Sadness	(Japan) / (France)	Eiichi Yamamoto	Mushi Production	Traditional	
1974	The Nine Lives of Fritz the Cat	(United States)	Robert Taylor	Steve Krantz Productions, Cine Camera, American International Pictures	Traditional	First American animated film to receive an R rating
1974	Down and Dirty Duck	(United States)	Charles Swenson	New World Pictures	Traditional	
1975	Coonskin	(United States)	Ralph Bakshi		Traditional	
1975	Tarzoon: Shame of the Jungle	(Belgium) / (France)	Picha, Boris Szulzinger		Traditional	
1976	Once Upon a Girl	(United States)	Don Jurwich		Traditional	Originally rated X, rating surrendered by Severin Films for unrated DVD release
1977	Wizards	(United States)	Ralph Bakshi		Traditional	
1978	The Lord of the Rings	(United States)	Ralph Bakshi		Traditional; Rotoscoping	
1978	Watership Down	(United Kingdom)	Martin Rosen	Nepenthe Productions	Traditional	Based on the 1972 novel by Richard Adams
1978	Lupin III: The Mystery of Mamo	(Japan)	Sōji Yoshikawa	Tokyo Movie Shinsha	Traditional	
1978	Ringing Bell	(Japan)	Masami Hata	Sanrio	Traditional	Based on Ringing Bell by Takashi Yanase
1978	Tadhana	(Philippines)	Severino "Nonoy" Marcelo		Traditional	
1979	Galaxy Express 999	(Japan)	Rintaro	Toei Animation	Traditional	
