= Astrorama =

Live album by Jean-Luc Ponty
- Released: 1970
- Recorded: Tokyo, August 29.1970
- Genre: Jazz fusion
- Label: Far East/Toshiba EMI
- Producer: Jean-Luc Ponty, Masahiko Satoh

Jean-Luc Ponty chronology
King Kong: Jean-Luc Ponty Plays the Music of Frank Zappa (1970)	Astrorama (1970)	Open Strings (1971)

Professional ratings
Review scores
Source	Rating
Allmusic	4/5 stars

Astrorama is an album by French Jazz fusion artist Jean-Luc Ponty and Japanese Avant-Garde artist Masahiko Satoh. It was released in 1970 on Toshiba EMI. The album was recorded live in Tokyo on August 29, 1970. Catalog: FAR EAST/TOSHIBA EMI (ETJ-65016)

== Track listing ==
=== Side one ===
1. "Golden Green" (Jean-Luc Ponty)
2. "And So On" (Masahiko Sato)

=== Side two ===
1. "Astrorama" (Jean-Luc Ponty)
2. "Nuggis" (Jean-Luc Ponty)

== Personnel ==
- Motohiko Hino – drums
- Yoshiaki Masuo – electric guitar
- Niels-Henning Ørsted Pedersen – bass
- Jean-Luc Ponty – electric violin
- Masahiko Satoh – piano, electric piano
