= Mushi Production =

Japanese animation studio

Mushi Production Co., Ltd.
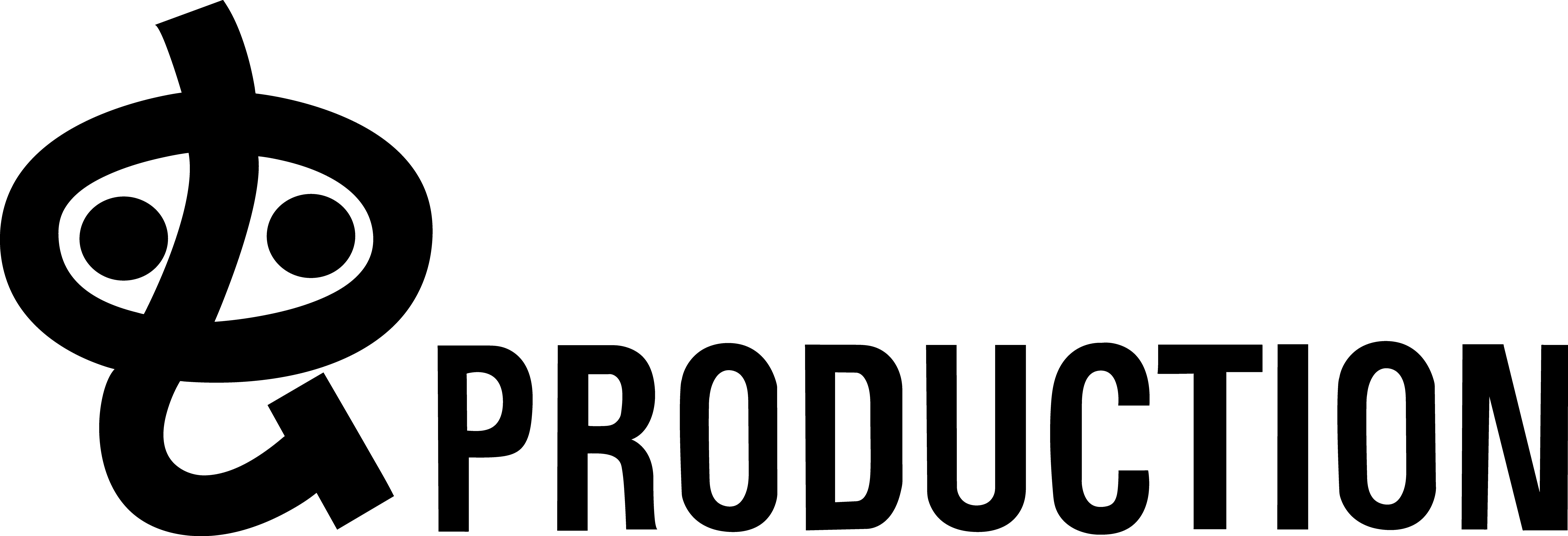

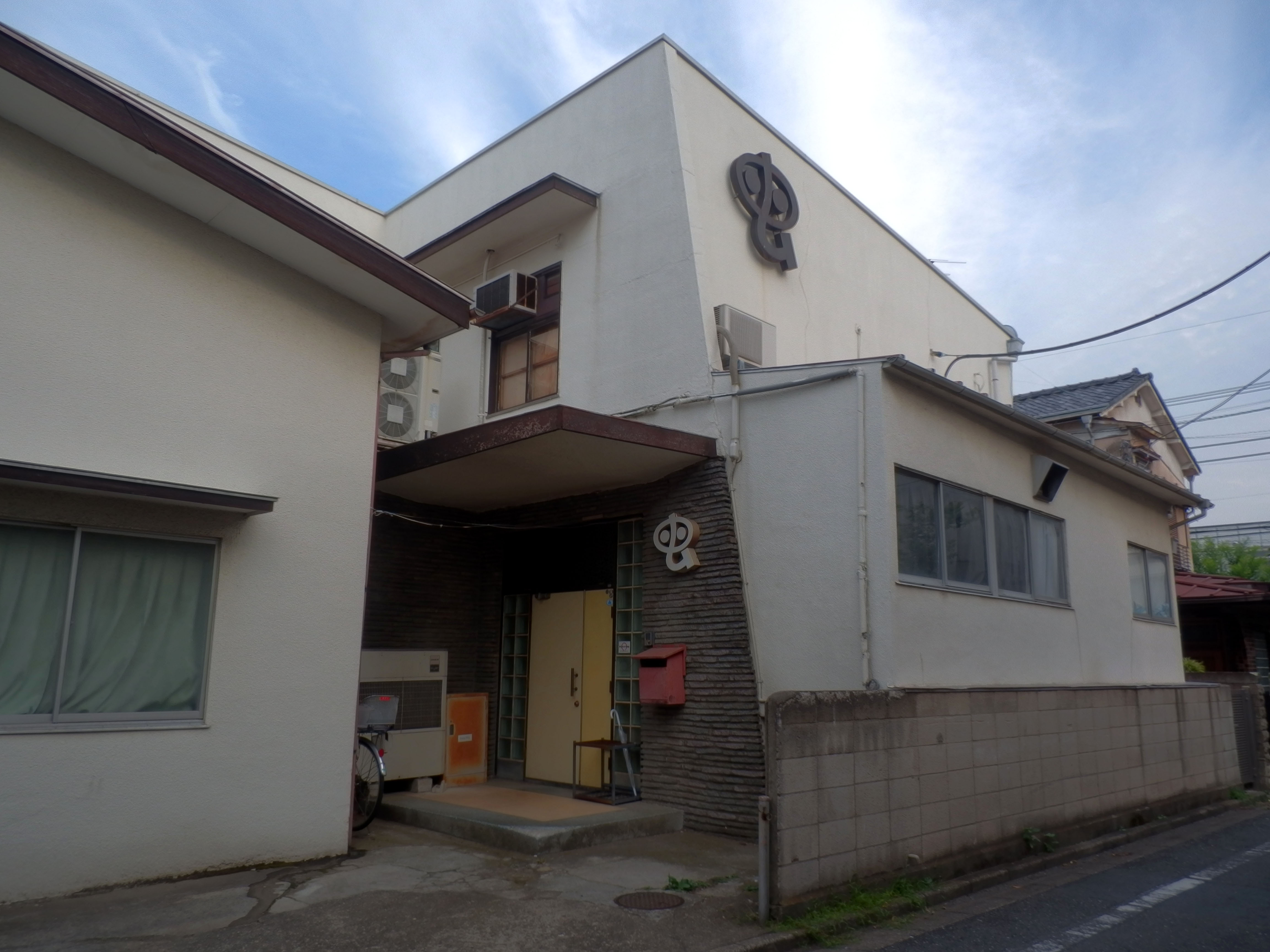
- Headquarters in Nerima, Tokyo
- Native name: 虫プロダクション株式会社
- Romanized name: Mushi Purodakushon Kabushiki-gaisha
- Type: Private
- Industry: Japanese animation
- Founded: 1961; 65 years ago (original company); November 26, 1977 (revived company)
- Founder: Osamu Tezuka
- Defunct: September 1973 (original company)
- Headquarters: Fujimidai, Nerima, Tokyo, Japan
- Website: www.mushi-pro.co.jp

Mushi Production (虫プロダクション, Mushi Purodakushon; "Bug Production") or Mushi Pro (Note: Shortened as Mushi Puro (ムシプロ) in Japanese.) for short, is a Japanese animation studio headquartered in Fujimidai, Nerima, Tokyo, Japan. It previously had a headquarters elsewhere in Nerima.

The studio was headed by manga artist Osamu Tezuka. Tezuka started it as a rivalry with Toei Animation, his former employer, after Tezuka's contract with Toei expired in 1961. The studio pioneered TV animation in Japan, and was responsible for many successful anime television series, such as Astro Boy, Gokū no Daibōken, Princess Knight, Kimba the White Lion, Dororo and Ashita no Joe, as well as more adult-oriented feature films such as A Thousand and One Nights, Cleopatra (the first Japanese X-rated animated film) and Belladonna of Sadness.

In addition to doing their anime productions, Mushi was best known for its overseas work on five traditionally animated TV projects from Arthur Rankin, Jr. and Jules Bass' Videocraft International (now Rankin/Bass Productions) in New York, New York, including the Christmas special Frosty the Snowman, with the production artwork being done by Paul Coker, Jr., along with the animation supervision by Yusaku "Steve" Nakagawa.

Morisawa argues that Tezuka "proposed an unrealistically suppressed production budget... in an attempt to outbid his competitors", a budget that contributed to the Studio's (and industry at the time) low profitability. Mushi, plagued by financial difficulties, declared bankruptcy in 1973 and its assets were divided. Tezuka had already left the company by then, having stepped down as acting director in 1968 and formed a new animation studio, Tezuka Productions (which made such works as Marvelous Melmo and Unico). The company was later reestablished on November 26, 1977, and has continued to operate as "legacy company".

The name "Mushi" means "insect" in Japanese, which is significant because Tezuka had a deep affection for insects, particularly since he was a fan of entomology from a young age. This passion is reflected in his pen name, "Osamu Tezuka," where "Tezuka" is derived from the word for "firefly" in Japanese.

== Productions ==
=== Original (1962–1973) ===
(based on the works of Osamu Tezuka)

==== Films ====
- Tales of a Street Corner (November 5, 1962) - experimental film
- Male (November 5, 1962) - experimental film
- Memory (September 21, 1964) - experimental film
- Mermaid (September 21, 1964) - experimental film
- Mighty Atom, the Brave in Space (July 26, 1964)
- Cigarettes and Ashes (October 1, 1965) - experimental film
- The Drop (October 1, 1965) - experimental film
- Jungle Emperor Leo Movie (July 31, 1966)
- Pictures at an Exhibition (November 11, 1966) - experimental film
- Genesis (October 1, 1968) - experimental film

==== Television series ====
- Tetsuwan Atomu (Astro Boy) (January 1, 1963 – December 31, 1966)
- Ginga Shōnen Tai (Galaxy Boy Troop) (April 7, 1963 – April 1, 1965)
- Wandā Surī (The Amazing 3) (June 6, 1965 – June 27, 1966)
- Janguru Taitei (Kimba the White Lion) (October 6, 1965 – September 28, 1966)
- Shin Janguru Taitei: Susume Reo! (Leo the Lion) (October 5, 1966 – March 29, 1967)
- Gokū no Daibōken (Adventures of the Monkey King) (January 7, 1967 – September 30, 1967)
- Ribon no Kishi (Princess Knight) (April 2, 1967 – April 7, 1968)
- Banpaiya (Vampire) (October 5, 1968 – March 29, 1969)
- Dororo (April 6, 1969 – September 28, 1969)
- Wansa-kun (Little Wansa) (April 2, 1973 – September 24, 1973)

==== Television specials ====
- Shin Takarajima (New Treasure Island) (January 3, 1965)
- Son Goku ga hajimaru yo! kofudaio no maki (Son Goku Is About to Begin! Volume of the Great Yellow Wind) (June 12, 1966) - Pilot
- Ribon no Kishi (Ribbon Knight) (1966; produced in November 1966, unaired) - Pilot
- Flying Ben (September 1967) - Pilot
- Dororo (January 1968) - Pilot
- Gum Gum Punch (April 1968) - Pilot
- Zero-Man (June 1968) - Pilot
- Norman (July 1968) - Pilot
- Space Journey: The First Dream of Wonder-kun (January 2, 1969)
- Astro Boy vs. the Giants (Kyojin no Hoshi tai Tetsuwan Atomu) (June 9, 1969, co-production with Tokyo Movie Shinsha and A Production)
- Till a City Beneath the Sea is Built (February 2, 1969)
- Blue Triton (October 1971) - Pilot

=== Non-original (1968–present) ===
(original TV/film productions, or adaptations of other material)

==== Television series ====
- Wanpaku Tanteidan (February 2, 1968 – September 26, 1968)
- Sabu to Ichi Torimono Hikae (October 3, 1968 – September 24, 1969; co-production with Toei Animation and Studio Zero)
- Animal 1 (April 1, 1968 – September 30, 1968)
- Moomin (October 5, 1969 – December 27, 1970; produced the anime from episode 27 to the final episode, the production from episode 1 to episode 26 was from Tokyo Movie Shinsha)
- Ashita no Joe (April 1, 1970 – September 29, 1971; original; second series was created by Tokyo Movie Shinsha)
- Andersen Monogatari (January 3, 1971 – December 26, 1971; co-production with Zuiyo Enterprise)
- Wandering Sun (April 8, 1971 – September 30, 1971)
- Kunimatsu-sama no Otōridai (October 6, 1971 - September 25, 1972)
- Wonder Beat Scramble (April 16, 1986 – November 19, 1986) - co-produced with Magic Bus

==== Films ====
- Animerama (film series)
  - A Thousand and One Nights (June 14, 1969)
  - Cleopatra (September 15, 1970) - Next-to-first film to be given the self-applied "X" rating in the United States.
  - Belladonna of Sadness (June 30, 1973)
- Yasashii Lion (March 21, 1970) - short film
- Adventures of the Polar Cubs (July 21, 1979)
- Ashita no Joe (March 8, 1980) - compilation film of the 1970–1971 series
- Yuki (August 9, 1981)
- Wata no Kunihoshi (February 11, 1984)
- Hi no Ame ga Furu (September 15, 1988)
- Ise-wan Taifu Monogatari (November 4, 1989)
- Ushiro no Shoumen Daare (March 9, 1991)
- Zō Ressha ga Yatte Kita (July 4, 1992)
- Senbon Matsubara: Kawa to Ikiru Shōnen-tachi (July 11, 1992) - co-produced with Magic Bus
- Tsuru ni Notte - Tomoko no Bōken (July 17, 1993) - short film
- Raiyantsūrii no Uta (January 6, 1994)
- Pipi Tobenai Hotaru (March 23, 1996)
- Maya no Isshou (August 20, 1996)
- Eikō e no Spur: Igaya Chiharu Monogatari (September 13, 1997)
- Ecchan no Sensou (January 13, 2002)
- Asu o Tsukutta Otoko - Tanabe Sakuro to Biwako Sosui (March 13, 2003)
- Nagasaki 1945: Angelus no Kane (September 9, 2005)
- Pattenrai!! ~ Minami no Shima no Mizu Monogatari (November 15, 2008)
- Hikawa Maru Monogatari (August 22, 2015)

==== OVAs ====
- Toki-iro Kaima (March 20, 1989 – February 25, 1990)
- Blue Sonnet (July 16, 1989 – June 25, 1990)
- Legend of the Galactic Heroes (1997, episodes 100 and 106)
- Kuzuryuugawa to Shounen (October, 1998)
- Legend of the Galactic Heroes: A Hundred Billion Stars, A Hundred Billion Lights (1998, episodes 15, 18, and 19)
- Kaitou Gary no Nihonjin Kouryakuhou! (1999)
- Kuma no Minakuro to Kouhei Jiisan (1999)
- Kochira Tamago Outou Negaimasu (2008)

==== Commission work ====
- Frosty the Snowman (December 7, 1969; American production by Rankin/Bass Productions with animation by Mushi Production)
- The Mad, Mad, Mad Comedians (April 7, 1970; American production by Rankin/Bass Productions with animation by Mushi Production)
- The Reluctant Dragon and Mr. Toad Show (September 12, 1970 – December 26, 1970; American production by Rankin/Bass Productions with animation by Mushi Production)
- Mad Mad Mad Monsters (September 23, 1972; American production by Rankin/Bass Productions with animation by Mushi Production)
- Festival of Family Classics (January 1, 1972 – November 26, 1973; American production by Rankin/Bass Productions with animation by Mushi Production and Topcraft; 17 episodes)

== See also ==
- Tama Production, an animation studio founded in 1965 by former Mushi Production animator Eiji Tanaka. Went bankrupt in 2011
- Tezuka Productions, another animation studio founded in 1968 by Tezuka
- Group TAC, an animation studio founded by former Mushi employees, including sound effects director Atsumi Tashiro, and animators Susumu Akitagawa and Gisaburo Sugii. Went bankrupt in 2010
- Madhouse, an animation studio founded by former Mushi animators, including Masao Maruyama, Osamu Dezaki, Rintaro and Yoshiaki Kawajiri. Now a subsidiary of Nippon Television. Maruyama later founded MAPPA in 2011
- Sunrise, an animation studio founded by former Mushi Production animators, now part of Bandai Namco Holdings
- Studio Pierrot, an animation studio founded by former Mushi Pro employees, along with employees from Tatsunoko Production
- Kyoto Animation, an animation studio founded in Kyoto by former Mushi Pro staff
- Shaft, a studio formerly concerned with cel work that eventually branched off into original productions, founded in 1975 by Hiroshi Wakao
- Studio Gallop, animation studio founded in 1978 by former Mushi Pro staffers
- A.P.P.P., animation studio founded in 1984 by Kazufumi Nomura. Dissolved in 2021
