= Chinatsu Nakayama =

Japanese seiyū, novelist, and politician

- 中山 千夏
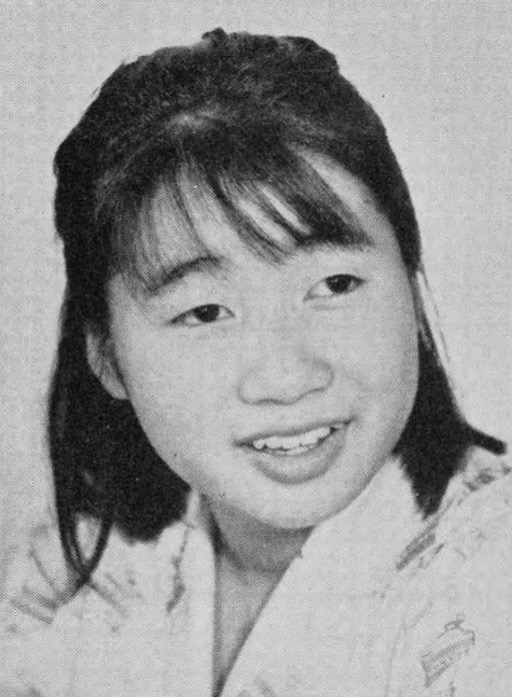
- Nakayama in 1963

Member of the House of Councillors
- In office 8 July 1980 – 7 July 1986
- Preceded by: Multi-member district
- Succeeded by: Constituency abolished
- Constituency: National district

Personal details
- Born: 13 July 1948 (age 78) Yamaga, Kumamoto, Japan
- Party: Independent
- Spouse: Masahiko Satoh (m. 1971; div. 1978)

Chinatsu Nakayama (中山千夏; born July 13, 1948) is a Japanese voice actress, writer, and politician.

== Biography ==
Nakayama was born in Kumamoto prefecture, Japan on July 13, 1948. She began acting on stage as a child in 1955, then her family moved to Tokyo with the encouragement of Kazuo Kikuta when Nakayama was 11 years old. She transitioned to television in 1968, hosting a television show called Ohiru no Waidoshō (お昼のワイドショー) for eight years. She also appeared on other NHK programs.

Nakayama started writing and becoming politically active in 1970. She was elected to the National Diet in 1980, but lost her re-election campaign in 1986. After leaving the Diet, Nakayama began writing full-time and continued advocating for human rights and against war. Her eight-volume autobiography, Koyaku no Jikan (子役の時間) was nominated for the Naoki Prize. She was nominated for the Naoki Prize for two other works as well.

== Selected bibliography ==
- Koyaku no Jikan (子役の時間), 1979

== Selected filmography ==
- Cleopatra, 1970
- Belladonna of Sadness, 1973
- Jarinko Chie, 1981

== Commercial filmography ==
- M&M's, 1977
