= Masahiko Satoh =

Japanese jazz pianist, composer and arranger

- Born: Masahiko Satoh (佐藤允彦, Satoh Masahiko); 6 October 1941 (age 84); Sumida-ku, Tokyo, Japan
- Genres: Jazz
- Occupations: Musician, composer, arranger
- Instrument: Piano
- Years active: Late 1950s–present
- Spouse: Chinatsu Nakayama (m. 1971; div. 1978)
- Website: www.mmjp.or.jp/m_satoh/English

Masahiko Satoh (佐藤 允彦, Satō Masahiko; born 6 October 1941) is a Japanese jazz pianist, composer and arranger.

== Early life ==
Satoh was born in Tokyo on 6 October 1941. His mother was Setsu and his father, who owned small businesses, was Yoshiaki Satoh. The house that his family moved into in 1944 contained a piano; Masahiko started playing it at the age of five. He began playing the piano professionally at the age of 17, "accompanying singers, magicians and strippers at a cabaret in the Ginza district".

== Later life and career ==
By 1959 Satoh was playing in Georgie Kawaguchi's band, together with alto saxophonist Sadao Watanabe and tenor saxophonist Akira Miyazawa. Satoh graduated from Keio University.

At the age of 26, Satoh moved to the United States to study at the Berklee College of Music. He stayed for two years, during which he read about composing and arranging. He earned money working in a food shop and playing the piano in a hotel. In 1968 he wrote the music for, and conducted, a series of pieces that were combined with dance and performed in New York. After returning to Japan, he recorded Palladium, his first album as leader, and appeared on a Helen Merrill album.

In his early career in the late 1960s and early 1970s, Satoh played in a free, percussive style. Satoh played at the 1971 Berlin Jazz Festival as part of a trio; he used a then-unusual ring modulator to alter the sound. Also in the early 1970s, he recorded with Attila Zoller, Karl Berger, and Albert Mangelsdorff. He wrote the psychedelic music for the 1973 anime film Belladonna of Sadness.

Satoh has written arrangements for recordings led by, among others, Merrill, Kimiko Itoh, and Nancy Wilson. He also arranged for strings and quartet on Art Farmer's 1983 album Maiden Voyage.

In 1990 Satoh formed a large group, named Rantooga, that combined various forms of folk musics from around the world. In the early 1990s he composed music for a choir of 1,000 Buddhist monks. In the early 1990s he was reported as stating that 70% of his time was spent on arranging and composing, and the rest on playing and recording.

== Compositions ==
Satoh has composed for film, television and advertisements. For instance, he made the music of Kanashimi no Belladonna, a film in which the sound is very important; all the songs of this movie are performed by his wife, Chinatsu Nakayama.

Some of his compositions are influenced by the space in the works of composer Toru Takemitsu. Satoh has also composed for traditional Japanese instruments, including the shakuhachi and biwa.

== Discography ==
An asterisk (*) after the year indicates that it is the year of release.

=== As leader/co-leader ===
Year recorded	Title	Label	Notes
1969*	Palladium	Express	Trio, with Yasuo Arakawa (bass), Masahiko Togashi (drums)
1970	Holography	Nippon Columbia	Solo
1970	Astrorama	Liberty	Co-led with Jean-Luc Ponty. Quintet, with Ponty (keyboards, vocals), Yoshiaki Masuo (guitar), Niels-Henning Ørsted Pedersen (bass), Motohiko Hino (drums)
1970	Kayobi No Onna (火曜日の女)	Toho	with Yoshiko Goto (vocals), Kiyoshi Sugimoto (guitar), Kunimitsu Inaba (bass), Yasuo Arakawa (bass), Akira Ishikawa (drums)
1970	Piano Deluxe Album	Polydor	Solo
1985	Amorphism	Epic Sony	Trio, with Eddie Gomez (bass), Steve Gadd (drums)
1985	As If...	Nippon Columbia	Trio, with Eddie Gomez (bass), Steve Gadd (drums)
1988	Double Exposure	Epic Sony	Trio, with Eddie Gomez (bass), Steve Gadd (drums)
1990	Lunar Cruise	Epic Sony	Duo, with Midori Takada (percussion)
1990	Randooga: Select Live Under The Sky'90	Epic Sony	Live at the Yomiuriland open theatre East in July 1990. Special guest: Wayne Shorter.
2002–03	Masahiko Plays Masahiko	Ewe	Solo piano
2005	Voyages	BAJ	Co-led with Joelle Leandre (bass); in concert
2007	Nyozegamon	Ohrai	Solo piano
2007	Rocking Chair	BAJ	Solo piano
2009	Summer Night	Studio Songs	Solo piano
2010	Afterimages	BAJ	Duo, with Je Chun Park (percussion)
2011	Edo Gigaku	BAJ	Trio, with Shinichi Kotoh (bass), Hiroshi Murakami (drums)
2011	Yatagarasu	Not Two	Co-led with Peter Brötzmann (alto sax, tenor sax, tárogató, clarinet), Takeo Moriyama (drums); in concert
2013	Spring Snow	PNL	Co-led with Paal Nilssen-Love (drums, percussion); in concert
2013	Doushin Gigaku	BAJ	Trio, with Shinichi Kotoh (bass), Hiroshi Murakami (drums)
2013	Serendip	BAJ	Duo, with Pradeep Ratnayake (sitar)
2017	Miku Hatsune sings Osamu Tezuka and Isao Tomita	Nippon Columbia	A series of arrangements and remixes of Isao Tomita's compositions for Osamu Tezuka's works sung by Miku Hatsune

=== As sideman ===
Year recorded	Leader	Title	Label
1970	Steve Marcus	Something	Nippon Columbia
1971	Helen Merrill	S'posin	Storyville
1973	Anthony Braxton	Four Compositions (1973)	Denon
1985	Eddie Gómez	Mezgo	Epic
2003	Joëlle Léandre	Signature	Red Toucan
2011	Peter Brötzmann	Long Story Short	Trost
2012	Ken Vandermark and Paal Nilssen-Love	Extended Duos	Audio Graphic

== In popular culture ==
A fictionalized version of Masahiko Satoh appears in Izumi Suzuki's short story "Hey, It's a Love Psychedelic!" as the narrator's love interest.
