= Leo the Lion (TV series) =

1966 anime television series

- Rune, Rukio, Lea, and Leo
- 新ジャングル大帝 進めレオ!
- Based on: Kimba the White Lion by Osamu Tezuka
- Directed by: Rintaro
- Music by: Isao Tomita
- Country of origin: Japan
- Original language: Japanese
- No. of episodes: 26

Production
- Producer: Eiichi Yamamoto
- Production company: Mushi Productions

Original release
- Network: Fuji TV
- Release: October 5, 1966 – March 29, 1967

Leo the Lion (新ジャングル大帝 進めレオ!, Shin Janguru Taitei: Susume Reo!; lit. 'New Jungle Emperor: Move Ahead Leo!') is a sequel to the Japanese anime television series Jungle Emperor, (localized in English as Kimba the White Lion). While the original 1965 series primarily followed the first half of Osamu Tezuka's original manga series, this series more closely adapted the second half and was produced in 1966 without the first series' American partners. An English dub of the series was first broadcast in the United States in 1984 on the CBN Cable Network (now Freeform).

Making the series without a co-producer gave Tezuka complete creative control. For example, Tezuka changed the conclusion of his original manga story (represented in the last two episodes of this series) to a happy ending.

The story of Leo the Lion follows many years from the end of the Jungle Emperor series, when Leo has become a full adult. At the end of the first series, in the original Japanese script, Leo promises to keep his animals separate from humans; this drives Leo to behave hermit-like in this series, leading to some confusion in English-speaking audiences. As the series unfolds, the focus shifts from the title character to his son, a male cub named Rune (nicknamed "Runi"). This series as a whole is about Rune's growth, from a helpless cub to a confident leader.

This Japanese series was dubbed into English by a company based in Miami, Florida in the United States known as SONIC-Sound International Corporation, and run by Enzo Caputo. The theme song for the English dub was written by Mark Boccaccio and Susan Brunet.

Stuart Chapin, who dubbed many of the voices into English, "colloquialized" all 26 scripts. After Chapin and Caputo clashed about basic matters (Chapin wanted the series to reference Kimba, a show Caputo never heard of; Chapin also wanted the Thompson gazelle to be called "Tommy" but Caputo stuck with "Tumy" because that was how the Japanese spelled it), Chapin ignored most of the plots and made up the scripts as he pleased, matching the dialog to lip movements. Thus, an elephant quotes a poem by Emily Dickinson and a gadget-heavy spy episode becomes a vehicle for "Sterling Bond", James Bond's hapless brother. In later scripts, puns abounded. In the last script, Chapin had Leo/Kimba (voiced by Caputo himself) explain the Kimba name mix-up by claiming that "Kimba" was a word that meant "little coward".

== Characters ==
While there is a common misconception that Leo's cub Rune is Leo himself, Leo is actually grown up to a fully adult lion with white fur. Unlike the previous series, the producers of the English-dubbed version of this series used the original Japanese names for nearly all the characters:

- Leo
- Lea
- LoLo
- Coco
- Mandy
- Rune and Rukio
- Squawk
- Tommy
- Rick The Lycon
- Grandpa Leopard
- Mr. Hunter
- Rhino
- Agura the Terrible One
- Bizo
- Pagoola
- The Saber-Toothed Tiger
- Triceratops Herd
- Huge The Gorilla
- Zamba the Blue Lion
- The Ceratosaurus
- The Mahamba
- Raffe
- Dr. Sugi
- Christopher Sugi

== Voice cast ==
=== Original Japanese voices (1966) ===
- Takashi Toyama – Leo
- Haruko Kitahama – Lea
- Eiko Masuyama – Rukio
- Kyoko Satomi – Rune
- Gorō Naya – Purasu
- Junji Chiba – Higeoyaji
- Mayo Suzukaze – Guest
- Tōru Ōhira – Ronmel

=== English dubbing voices (1991) ===
- Enzo Caputo – Leo
- Jose Alvarez – Rune
- Stuart Chapin – Parrot, Panther, Rhino, others

Others in the English dubbing voice cast for this anime are not available at present for listing.
