= Lion Books =

Japanese manga series

- Cover of volume 1 of Lion Books, from the Osamu Tezuka Manga Complete Works edition

ライオンブックス (Raion Bukkusu)
- Manga
- Written by: Osamu Tezuka
- Published by: Shueisha
- Magazine: Omoshiro Book
- Original run: August 1956 – July 1957
- Volumes: 11
- Manga

Lion Books II
- Written by: Osamu Tezuka
- Published by: Shueisha
- Magazine: Weekly Shōnen Jump
- Original run: March 22, 1971 – February 19, 1973
- Volumes: 24

Lion Books (Japanese: ライオンブックス, Hepburn: Raion Bukkusu) is a Japanese manga series written and illustrated by Osamu Tezuka. It was published by Shueisha in the Omoshiro Book as a supplement. The same company published Lion Books II in Weekly Shōnen Jump in the 1970s, which would commonly be referred to as The New Lion Books. The series was partially adapted into an experimental anime series in the 1980s and 1990s.

== 1950s manga series ==
There are no continuations or relations between any of the stories.

#	Name	Original name	Released
1	The Next Human Beings (来るべき人類, Kitarubeki Jinrui)		August 1956
2	The Black Space Ray (くろい宇宙線, Kuroi Uchū-sen)		September 1956
3	Spaceport (宇宙空港, Uchū Kūkō)	Spaceport	October 1956
4	Spaceport (宇宙空港, Uchū Kūkō)	Orion No. 137 (オリオン137星, Orion 137 Hoshi)	November 1956
5	The Green Cat (緑の猫, Midori no Neko)		December 1956
6	Earthquake Predicting Old Lady (恐怖山脈, Kyōfu Sanmyaku)	Earth Theater 1 (地球劇場1)	January 1957
7	Twin Murder (双生児殺人事件, Sōseiji Satsujin Jiken)	Earth Theater 2 (地球劇場2)	February 1957
8	The Crazy Border (狂った国境, Kurutta Kokkyō)	Earth Theater 3 (地球劇場3)	March 1957
9	Multiple-Eyed Devil (複眼魔人, Fukugan Majin)	Multiple-Eyed Devil: Part 1 (複眼魔人（前編）, Fukugan Majin Zenpen)	April 1957
10	Multiple-Eyed Devil (複眼魔人, Fukugan Majin)	Multiple-Eyed Devil: Part 2 (複眼魔人（後編）, Fukugan Majin Kōhen)	May 1957
11	Skipper Skeleton (白骨船長, Hakkotsu Senchō)		June 1957
12	Bullet Hole in the Wilderness (荒野の弾痕, Kōya no Dankon)		July 1957

== 1970s manga series ==
There are no continuations or relations between any of the stories.

#	Name	Original name	Released
1	Adachi-ga Hara (安達が原)		March 22, 1971
2	Mirage (白縫, Hakunui)		April 26, 1971
3	Serenade of Pig's Navel (ブタのヘソのセレナーデ, Buta no Heso no Serenāde)		May 24, 1971
4	The Closed Classroom (あかずの教室, Akazu no Kyōshitsu)		June 21, 1971
5	A Hundred Tales (百物語, Hyaku Monogatari)	Wandering (百物語・放浪編)	July 26, 1971
6	A Hundred Tales (百物語, Hyaku Monogatari)	Osorezan (百物語・恐山編)	August 23, 1971
7	A Hundred Tales (百物語, Hyaku Monogatari)	Gold (百物語・黄金編)	September 27, 1971
8	A Hundred Tales (百物語, Hyaku Monogatari)	Usurpation (百物語・下剋上編)	October 25, 1971
9	Mosa, the Flying Squirrel (モモンガのムサ, Momonga no Musa)		November 22, 1971
10	Collapse (コラープス, Korāpusu)		December 27, 1971
11	The Moon and Wolves (月と狼たち, Tsuki to Okami-tachi)		January 17, 1972
12	Mother River (おふくろの河, Ofukuro no Kawa)		February 14, 1972
13	Mansion OBA (マンションOBA, Manshon OBA)		March 20, 1972
14	Color of Full-blown Flower in Spring (春らんまんの花の色, Haru Ranman no Hana no Iro)		April 17, 1972
15	Mimigarasu (耳ガラス)	Mimigarasu	May 15, 1972
16	Mimigarasu (耳ガラス)	Dendekoden (でんでこでん)	June 19, 1972
17	Seven Men from Outer Space (荒野の七ひき, Kōya no Nana Hiki)		July 17, 1972
18	The March Covered with Mud (泥だらけの行進, Dorodarake no Kōshin)		August 14, 1972
19	Muse and Don (ミューズとドン, Myūzu to Don)	Muse and Don 1: Wicked (ミューズとドン1-妖獣, Myūzu to Don 1 - Yōjū)	September 18, 1972
20	Muse and Don (ミューズとドン, Myūzu to Don)	Muse and Don 2: Call of Field (ミューズとドン2-野の呼び声, Myūzu to Don 2 - No no Yobigoe)	October 16, 1972
21	Muse and Don (ミューズとドン, Myūzu to Don)	Muse and Don 3: Timetable of Underground (ミューズとドン3地底の時刻表, Myūzu to Don 3 - Chitei no Jigokuhyō)	November 20, 1972
22	The Sweet Smell of Success (成功のあまきかおり, Seikō no Amaki Kaori)		December 18, 1972
23	The Distant Planet (はるかなる星, Harukanaru Hoshi)		January 22, 1973
24	The Strange School (奇動館, Kidō-kan)		February 19, 1973

== Anime adaptations ==
Two of the stories in the manga were adapted into an experimental anime series, titled the Lion Books Collection. The original concept was to make 26 new anime episodes and canvass them for sale without any broadcast contract with TV stations. The first adaptation came in 1983 using the story "The Green Cat". It is regarded as the first attempt to produce an original video animation release on October 10. With no other episodes to follow in production, it very well could have been qualified as the first anime OVA, but because there is uncertainty as to whether the VHS was actually available for sale at the production end date, Dallos is credited to be the first official OVA released by the industry. The Green Cat is known to be screened in the "4th Tezuka Osamu Fan Club Meeting" on October 10 of the same year.

The second story "Adachi-ga Hara" was adapted in 1991, and became the only film in the series to be released to theaters. Four other stories were filmed in from non-manga sources. The series was re-released as a DVD on March 21, 2003. It is also available on the streaming service Viki. The five first episodes were directed by Osamu Tezuka himself, while the last, shown at a Hong Kong Film Festival, was the first anime directed by his son Makoto Tezuka.

Story	Anime	Release
1	The Green Cat (緑の猫, Midori no Neko)	October 10, 1983
2	Rain Boy (雨ふり小僧, Amefuri Kozō)	December 24, 1983
3	Lunn Flies into the Wind (るんは風の中, Run wa Kaze no Naka)	April 13, 1985
4	Yamataro Comes Back (山太郎かえる, Yamataro Kaeru)	August 15, 1986
5	Adachi-ga Hara (安達が原)	November 16, 1991
6	Akuemon (悪右衛門)	July 16, 1993

== See also ==
- List of Osamu Tezuka manga
- List of Osamu Tezuka anime
- Osamu Tezuka's Star System
