= Gum Gum Punch =

Japanese manga series by Osamu Tezuka

- Cover of Gum Gum Punch from the Osamu Tezuka Manga Complete Works edition.

ガムガムパンチ (Gamu Gamu Panchi)
- Genre: Comedy
- Manga
- Written by: Osamu Tezuka
- Published by: Shogakukan
- Magazine: Shogaku-Ichinensei; Shogaku-Ninensei
- Original run: April 1967 – September 1969
- Volumes: 1

Gum Gum Punch (ガムガムパンチ, Gamu Gamu Panchi) is a manga by Osamu Tezuka that began serialization in 1967.

== Plot ==
In this children's manga, Punch and his sister Pinko are approached by a strange man calling himself the God of Gum. Looking like a kind of eccentric scientist, he explains that the gum he has is special as it will allow the gum chewer to create whatever they want with the bubbles they blow. However, since Punch and Pinko are still young, they have not mastered the ability to blow bubbles.

Seeing as this might be a problem, and to prevent the children from potentially misusing the gum, the God of Gum assigns his disciple, Gum Gum, to stay with the children. Together, the three explore the many possible uses of the magical chewing gum and get into mischief.

== Characters ==
- Punch: A young boy who, along with his sister, is given magical chewing gum. When chewed, the bubble that is blown can take the shape of just about anything the chewer desires.
- Pinko: Punch's younger sister who can also use the magic chewing gum.
- Gum Gum: A disciple of the God of Gum who is assigned to make sure the children don't abuse the gum's powers and to help teach them how to blow bubbles properly. Punch often picks on him because he is so short.
- Kucha Kucha: Another disciple of the God of Gum, but is far larger than Gum Gum. He joins Gum Gum in looking after the kids when Gum Gum needs an extra hand.
- God of Gum: A strange man who looks like a kind of scientist who is a master of chewing gum. He gives the children magical chewing gum, and assigned
- Mama: Punch and Pinko's mother.

== See also ==
- List of Osamu Tezuka anime
- List of Osamu Tezuka manga
- Osamu Tezuka
- Osamu Tezuka's Star System
