= Marvelous Melmo =

Japanese manga series

- Cover to Marvelous Melmo from the Osamu Tezuka Manga Complete Works edition.

ふしぎなメルモ (Fushigi na Merumo)
- Genre: Magical girl
- Manga
- Written by: Osamu Tezuka
- Published by: Shogakukan
- Magazine: Shogaku-Ichinensei
- Original run: September 1970 – March 1972
- Volumes: 1
- Anime television series
- Directed by: Tsunehito Nagaki; Osamu Tezuka
- Studio: Tezuka Productions
- Original network: JNN (ABC, TBS)
- Original run: 3 October 1971 – 26 March 1972
- Episodes: 26

Marvelous Melmo (ふしぎなメルモ, Fushigi na Merumo) is a magical girl manga and anime by Osamu Tezuka. This series centered on Melmo, a nine-year-old girl whose mother is killed in an auto accident and has to then take care of her two younger brothers (Totoo and Touch). While in Heaven, the children's mother is given one wish. Her wish is that Melmo (the oldest out of her 3 children) will be allowed to grow up more quickly than usual, since their lives as children will be difficult without their parents.

Melmo's mother is permitted to visit her as a ghost, and gives Melmo a bottle of candy given to her by God. The blue candy turns Melmo into a lovely 19-year-old version of herself, while the red candy turns her back into a child. Combining the two turns her first into a fetus, then into an animal of her choosing. When Melmo ages from 9 to 19 her clothes don't grow with her, usually resulting either in shredded clothes, or skin-tight children's clothes on the body of an adult woman, leaving little to the imagination (for this reason the series was one of the first to make regular use of the now-common panchira, or "panty shot"). This was only the case of the anime; the manga had Melmo's clothes change with her into whatever she desired (ranging from a police uniform to a fairy costume). A total of 26 animated episodes were produced, which aired from 1971 to 1972.

Although most of the episodes of the anime revolve around adventure stories, Tezuka intended the series to also function as a kind of introductory sex education for children and Darwinist evolution. That being the case, not surprisingly the series only aired in Japan and Italy (as I bon bon magici di Lilly, lit. Lilly's magic bon bons). When the manga first appeared in 1970, it was originally titled Mamaa-chan, but by the time the anime debuted in 1971, the name of the main character was changed to "Melmo" (derived from "metamorphose") due to "Mamaa" having been previously trademarked. Many Japanese parents reportedly hated the show, since it raised many questions from children that parents were uncomfortable with answering.

== Characters ==
Melmo Watari (also known as Lilly)
Voiced by: Reiko Muto (1971), Maria Kawamura (1998 Renewal Version)
Melmo is a kind-hearted girl who is frequently torn between her actual age (nine at the beginning) and the things she encounters and wants as her older self (for example, a boyfriend or a husband, or to be able to breastfeed her baby brother Touch). The 19-year-old Melmo is quite beautiful and men frequently fall in love with her. In the last few episodes of the series Melmo acquires a boyfriend, Jiro, whom she eventually marries. During the final episode — and several years after Melmo's and Jiro's wedding — Melmo gives birth to a baby girl, in whom resides her late mother's spirit, thus reuniting mother and daughter (and reversing their relationship).

Melmo as a 19-year-old is not smarter or more experienced than her 9-year-old self, though at 19, she is given more opportunities to learn about adult matters than she would at the age of nine.

Totoo Watari
Voiced by: Minori Matsushima (1971), Sachi Matsumoto (1998 Renewal Version)
Totoo is the eldest of Melmo's two brothers. He spends much of the TV series as a frog due to having eaten a red and a blue candy. As a frog, he is too small to consume the candy that would return him back into a human, so Melmo spends almost half of the series trying to figure out how to turn him back into a human (which she eventually manages to do).
Touch Watari
Voiced by: Kazuko Sawada (1971 Episodes 1-7), Yuko Yoshimi (1971, Episodes 8-26), Naoko Ishi (1998 Renewal Version, Baby), Sōichirō Hoshi (1998 Renewal Version, Boy)
Touch is the youngest of Melmo's brothers and a baby. His role in the series is to give children some idea of what is required to raise a baby.
Professor Waragarasu
Voiced by: Kōichi Kitamura (1971), Tomomichi Nishimura (1998 Renewal Version)
Professor Waregarasu is a citizen of a country called Chicchaina, and secretly opposes the country's authoritarian government. Melmo and Waregarasu escape from Chicchaina (where Melmo has been held captive) and Waregarasu spends the remainder of the series in Japan, though in the final episode he returns to Chicchaina. He acts as something of an advisor and occasional guardian for Melmo and her brothers. He explains matters of human reproduction and sexuality to Melmo whenever she raises questions about the subject. Although he offers to adopt Melmo and her brothers in the final episode, and bring them back to Chicchaina with him, Melmo instead accepts an invitation from Jiro's family for the three of them to live in their home, thus solving their dilemma.
Jiro
Jiro is one of three brothers (the other two are Ichiro and Saburo) who all fall in love with the 19-year-old Melmo. He is the one that Melmo picks and eventually marries. He only appears in the last few episodes.

Melmo's mother, Hitomi, and God play small roles on occasion throughout the series.

== Availability ==
The entire series has been made available for streaming to international audiences on various streaming services, which may vary over time.

The complete manga series has been collected and is available in Japan. A DVD set collecting all the episodes in the series was released in 2003, but, according to some sources, might now be out of print in Japan. During the 1990s, the series was available on a set of seven laserdiscs, as well as on a set of 12 VHS videocassettes. The full series was also released in Italy on a 5-DVD set, containing Italian and Japanese audio tracks. Some episodes have been shown on channel 47 in New York in the 1980s in a Japanese program block. The series re-aired in 1998 on the Japanese satellite channel WOWOW as Marvelous Melmo Renewal (ふしぎなメルモ リニューアル, Fushigi na Merumo Rinyūaru). This version differed from the original broadcast version since it was given new opening and closing credits, new voice dubs, and the image quality was restored. Since then, it has also aired on the Tokyo TV station Tokyo MX.

== Differences between the manga and anime ==
The manga and anime versions of Marvelous Melmo are quite similar. In contrast to The Amazing 3, several Marvelous Melmo manga stories were adapted and animated for the TV series.

== Episodes ==
There are 26 episodes in all, running from 1971 to 1972.

== Other appearances ==
As a member of Tezuka's Star System, both versions of Melmo made a number of other appearances in Tezuka manga throughout the 1970s, mostly in the Black Jack manga. The older Melmo (as two different women) is also a main character in 1970's Apollo no Uta (Apollo's Song).

== See also ==
- List of Osamu Tezuka anime
- List of Osamu Tezuka manga
- Osamu Tezuka
- Osamu Tezuka's Star System
