= Little Wansa =

Japanese manga series

- Wansa-kun
- Wansa and his friends (Wansa is second to the left).

ワンサくん (Little Wansa)
- Genre: Comedy, drama
- Manga
- Written by: Osamu Tezuka
- Published by: Mushi Production Commercial Firm
- Magazine: Tezuka Magazine Leo
- Original run: October 1971 – February 1972
- Volumes: 1
- Anime television series
- Directed by: Eiichi Yamamoto
- Produced by: Yoshinobu Nishizaki
- Written by: Keisuke Fujikawa; Eiichi Yamamoto
- Music by: Hiroshi Miyagawa
- Studio: Mushi Production; Group TAC
- Original network: FNS (KTV, Fuji TV)
- Original run: 2 April 1973 – 24 September 1973
- Episodes: 26

Little Wansa (ワンサくん, Wansa-kun) is a mascot for Sanwa Bank designed by Osamu Tezuka. It was later turned into a manga series (which was left unfinished) by Tezuka in 1971, and later a complete anime series in 1973.

The hero of Wansa-kun was Wansa, a puppy who is sold for a pittance, then escapes, and spends much of the rest of the series looking for his mother.

In 1973, an animated series based on the manga was made, produced by Mushi Production and aired on KTV and Fuji TV. As with the earlier Triton of the Sea, Tezuka had little-to-no involvement in this series and Wansa-kun ultimately ended up being the last series produced by the original Mushi Production before its bankruptcy.

A "Little Wansa" stage play adaptation played from August 18 to 28 2016.

== Manga ==
Wansa-kun was originally serialised in 'Tezuka Magazine Leo', starting with the first volume in 1971. However, the series was left unfinished as Mushi Production, the company of Tezuka Magazine Leo, experienced labour disputes and the magazine lost focus.

== Anime ==
The manga was adapted into a television anime in April of 1973, and was completed in late September of that same year. The anime series lasted 26 episodes. The first 21 episodes were comedic in nature, but the final five episodes took a more dramatic turn with Wansa beginning his search for his mother. Unlike the manga version which was never completed, he succeeded in the final episode of the anime series.

After the series finished production, Nishizaki and many of his production team on this series went to work on Space Battleship Yamato.

== Cast ==
- Noriko Ohara as Wansa
- Ichirô Nagai as Megane
- Jouji Yanami as Lupin
- Kaneta Kimotsuki as Gamble
- Kei Tomiyama as Kuma
- Masako Nozawa as Kouta
