= The Sensualist =

1991 animated film by Eiichi Yamamoto

好色一代男 (Kōshoku Ichidai Otoko)
- Genre: Drama, erotica, historical
- Novel
- Written by: Ihara Saikaku
- Published: 1682
- Original video animation
- Directed by: Yukio Abe
- Written by: Eiichi Yamamoto
- Studio: Grouper Production
- Licensed by: Western Connection (UK, VHS, 1993, subbed)
- Released: January 18, 1991
- Runtime: 55 minutes

The Sensualist (好色一代男, Kōshoku Ichidai Otoko) is a Japanese adult animated historical drama film directed by Yukio Abe, based on part of the 17th century novel of the same name by Ihara Saikaku.
