= Animerama =

Japanese anime film trilogy

- The Animerama logo, as seen in the English version of A Thousand and One Nights.

アニメラマ
- Films
- A Thousand and One Nights (1969); Cleopatra (1970); Belladonna of Sadness (1973)
- Manga

Cleopatra
- Written by: Osamu Tezuka
- Illustrated by: Hisashi Sakaguchi
- Published by: Fukkan
- Magazine: COM
- Volumes: 1

Animerama (Japanese: アニメラマ) is a trilogy of thematically related adult anime feature films originally conceived and initiated by Osamu Tezuka and made at his Mushi Production animation studio from the late 1960s to early 1970s.

As well as the erotic themes, they are also defined by mixing more typical traditional animation with sequences of UPA and Yōji Kuri–influenced experimental use of modern design, limited animation, and still paintings akin to Tezuka's experimental short films and like those largely were all directed, sometimes sharing the billing with Tezuka, by Eiichi Yamamoto. The first two are also notable for having scores by famed composer and electronic rearranger Isao Tomita. The third, Belladonna, made without Tezuka's direct involvement, is more serious than its predecessors and more avant-garde still, telling its story largely through pans over still, panoramic paintings with narration.

The three films in the trilogy are:

- A Thousand and One Nights (千夜一夜物語, Senya Ichiya Monogatari) (1969)
- Cleopatra (クレオパトラ, Kureopatora) (1970)
- Belladonna of Sadness (哀しみのベラドンナ, Kanashimi no Beradonna) (1973)

All three were released onto DVD-Video by the video division of Columbia Music Entertainment, both separately and as a box set, in 2004 in Japan and re-released in 2006.

A 1991 original video animation based on part of Ihara Saikaku's The Life of an Amorous Man (released on VHS in the United Kingdom and Ireland as The Sensualist) made at Grouper Production is sometimes considered an unofficial successor to the trilogy, owing to the involvement of Yamamoto as screenwriter and its similar experimental imagery.

== See also ==
- List of Osamu Tezuka anime
- Pier Paolo Pasolini's Trilogy of Life
  - The Decameron
  - The Canterbury Tales
  - Arabian Nights
