= Nabe Osami =

Japanese comedian and actor

Osami Nabe (real name Shuzo Watanabe, born May 2, 1939) is a Japanese comedian and actor.

== Early life and education ==
Nabe was born in Omori, Tokyo. He graduated from Tokyo Metropolitan Omori High School and attended Meiji University beginning in 1958, where he studied drama.

While he was still in school, he wrote a radio script as a disciple of Toriro Miki. However, aspiring to be a comedian, he became an attendant to Shintaro Katsu and Hiroshi Mizuhara, and he and Mizuhara entered Watanabe Productions at the same time. Mizuhara would leave Watanabe Productions, but Nabe remained and became Hajime Hana's attendant. From the time he was his attendant, he had his own business cards that he gave out to people in the television industry. Watanabe Productions paid for his tuition while he was in college. Nabe graduated from Meiji University in 1962 with a graduation thesis titled "Public Laughter in Comedy Trio".

== Career ==
During his time working as an attendant, Nabe was a radio disc jockey, a composer, and a host of a jazz café. In 1968, he was selected to star in the movie "Onsen Guerrilla", and received praise for his performance. Subsequently, he was given the leading role in director Yoji Yamada's "If you blow it, you'll fly, man", and again performed well. After this, he left Watanabe Productions due to a conflict with Susumu Watanabe, a teacher from his school days. After serving as an attendant of Hisaya Morishige, he moved to Nippon Television in 1978, where he worked on the "Women's Nodo Jiman" section of Wide Show Look Look Hello; he made it one of the most popular corners of the show.

In 1991, suspicions about his son's Meiji University entrance examination were raised. He admitted to wrongdoing and apologized, saying, "I was approached by an acquaintance". Several members of the Meiji University Athletic Association were arrested in this incident, and former sumo club coaches were sentenced to prison. Nabe stepped back from his entertainment activities, including 'Look Look Hello', and was criticized by the media.

In December 1994, Nabe resumed his entertainment activities at Somid Hall in Ginza.

After 2001, he worked for Yoshimoto Kogyo for a time and appeared in Lumine the Yoshimoto, a comedy.

In addition, he seems to have a wide range of personal connections in various fields, and in Atsushi Mizoguchi's non-fiction "Emperor of meat", he is depicted as an aide to the former chairman of Hannan Group Mitsuru Asada.

== Personal life ==
His wife is Rumiko Sasa, and he has a son, Nabe Yakan, who is a comedian and former member of the Japanese powerlifting team. Yakan joined the Takeshi Corps and started performing arts activities as Nabe Yakan.

He was in a car accident in 2001.

== Filmography ==
=== Movies ===
| Film | Year | Role | Notes | Ref |
|---|---|---|---|---|
| Fukeba tobu yo na otoko daga | 1968 | | | |
| Ani Imouto | 1976 | Stripper's husband | | |
| Love Story Wo Kimi Ni | 1988 | | | |

=== Television ===
| Series/TV movie | Year | Channel | Role | Notes | Ref |
|---|---|---|---|---|---|
| Aoi | 2000 | NHK | Kikkawa Hiroie | Taiga drama | |
