= The Vampires (manga) =

Manga by Osamu Tezuka

バンパイヤ (Banpaiya)
- Manga
- Written by: Osamu Tezuka
- Magazine: Weekly Shōnen Sunday
- Original run: June 1966 – May 1967
- Volumes: 4
- Television drama
- Studio: Mushi Production
- Original network: Fuji TV
- Original run: October 5, 1968 – March 29, 1969
- Episodes: 26

The Vampires (バンパイヤ, Banpaiya) is a manga by Osamu Tezuka that began published weekly during 1966 to 1967.

== Plot ==
Toppei Tachibana, a mysterious teenager, visited Mushi Production and persuaded its president, Osamu Tezuka to let him work at his studio. Tezuka later discovered that Toppei is more than he sees: he is a vampire, which is a species that can transform from humans to a variety of animals, and he is a werewolf. Toppei came to Tokyo to search for his father, Professor Tachibana. After Toppei accidentally murdered Professor Atami, an old friend of Tezuka, Rokuro Makube, an evil teenager who is also the ward of Mika Onishi's family, blackmailed Tezuka to control Toppei to his advantages.

Meanwhile, Toppei's vampire community was planning a revolution against normal humans, and Rock sided with them to help him to manipulate the world. As chaos threatened the world, Toppei, Tezuka and Toppei's younger brother Chippei must work together to stop the vampires.

== Characters ==
- Toppei Tachibana is the protagonist of the manga. He is a vampire, and a typical werewolf. His transformations will be triggered when he is angry or hating someone (with the full moon).
- Osamu Tezuka is the president of Mushi Production and manga writer, he accepted Toppei as an employee of his production company. He discovered that Toppei is a vampire and helped him to stop the Vampires' revolution.
- Chippei Tachibana is Toppei's younger brother, he transforms to werewolf when he sees round things. His nose has great olfaction which proves to be great use.
- Rokuro Makube, a.k.a. Rock is the main antagonist of the manga series. He was the butler for Mika Onishi. It was revealed through the conversation between him and his best friend Saigo, that he was a village student before joining the rich Onishi family to steal their wealth, by kidnapping Mika (with Toppei's assistance as a werewolf) and made the Onishi's couples' will to give their inheritance to him before murdering them. Later he sided with the vampires so that their plan can help him to gain control over the world. He may be insane and charismatic and evil at some points, but he had a strong bond with his best and only friend: Saigo.

== Series cast ==
- Yutaka Mizutani - Toppei Tachibana
- Hiroshi Satō - Rokuro Makube aka Rock
- Fumio Watanabe - Morimura
- Yoshiaki Yamamoto - Chippei Tachibana
- Osamu Tezuka - Himself

== Availability in English ==
While the manga has yet to be fully translated, an excerpt was included in Tezuka's Shakespeare Manga Theater from Ablaze Publishing.

== Reception ==
Video game designer Yuji Horii and manga artist Hirohiko Araki stated themselves to be fans, and counted it among their favorite Tezuka manga.

== See also ==
- List of Osamu Tezuka manga
- Osamu Tezuka
- Osamu Tezuka's Star System
