= Gokū no Daibōken =

Japanese anime television series

悟空の大冒険
- Genre: Comedy, fantasy, shenmo
- Anime television series
- Directed by: Gisaburô Sugii
- Produced by: Eichi Kawabata
- Music by: Seichiro Uno
- Studio: Mushi Productions
- Original network: Fuji TV
- Original run: January 7, 1967 – September 30, 1967
- Episodes: 39

Gokū no Daibōken (悟空の大冒険; lit. Adventures of Wukong) is a Japanese anime series that was directed by Gisaburō Sugii. Made by Mushi Productions, the anime's 39 episodes were broadcast on Fuji TV between January 7 and September 30, 1967. The anime is based on the 16th-century novel Journey to the West.

== Characters ==
- Goku (悟空, Gokū) Based on Sun Wukong, the monkey king of legend, from Journey to the West. Voiced by: Kazuko Ute
- Tatsuko (竜子, Tatsuko) Voiced by: Eiko Masuyama
- Hakkai (八戒, Hakkai) Based on Zhu Bajie from Journey to the West. Voiced by: Junpei Takiguchi
- Sa Gojo (沙悟浄, Sa Gojō) Based on Sha Wujing from Journey to the West. Voiced by: Kinya Aikawa
- Sanzo (三蔵法師, Sanzō Hōshi) Based on Tang Sanzang, the monk from Journey to the West. Voiced by: Nachi Nozawa
- Narrator Voiced by: Shinsuke Chikaishi
