= Galaxy Boy Troop =

- Created by: Osamu Tezuka
- Directed by: Mushi Production
- Country of origin: Japan
- No. of series: 2
- No. of episodes: 92

Original release
- Network: NHK
- Release: April 7, 1963 – April 1, 1965

Galaxy Boy Troop (銀河少年隊) was a children's TV series created by Osamu Tezuka that combined marionettes with traditional animation. It ran for two seasons from April 7, 1963, to April 1, 1965, for a total of 92 episodes. The series also aired in France as Le Commando De La Voie Lactée .("Commando of the Milky Way").

The characters were represented by marionettes from the Takeda Puppet Troupe, while scenes of rocket flight were represented with animation. Occasionally, the producers incorporated live-action film of characters' lips moving superimposed on the puppets, in an effect similar to the little-used American Syncro-Vox technique.

In the first season, the eponymous Galaxy Boy Troop, headed by a boy named Rob, travels across the galaxy to find a material that can restart Earth's dying Sun. In the second season, the Troop fights off an alien invasion of Earth. Along the way, they meet and interact with the elegant Amia people of Venus, and the oafish Poipoi people of Mars.

The series has been considered lost for many years due to a very few episodes surviving. One full episode was found in France. It's believed that the show's original reels were dismantled due to Tezuka not being happy with how the show went.

== Characters ==
Although the show is primarily puppetry, it still manages to include many characters from Osamu Tezuka's Star System in marionette form.

- Rob, the leader of the Galaxy Boy Troop
- Myria
- Shunsaku Ban
- Mister 6, Rob's intelligent robot hovercar
- Pedro
- Dar, a small, big-eyed alien
- Tex, a reformed criminal
- Rubber Band
- Death, the villain

== See also ==
- Supermarionation
