= A Thousand and One Nights (1969 film) =

1969 Japanese anime film

- Theatrical release poster

Japanese name
- Kanji: 千夜一夜物語
Transcriptions
- Revised Hepburn: Sen'ya Ichiya Monogatari
- Directed by: Eiichi Yamamoto
- Screenplay by: Osamu Tezuka; Kazuo Fukasawa; Hiroyuki Kumai
- Based on: One Thousand and One Nights
- Produced by: Osamu Tezuka; Atsushi Tomioka
- Starring: Yukio Aoshima; Kyoko Kishida; Hiroshi Akutagawa
- Cinematography: Akira Tsuchiya
- Edited by: Masashi Furukawa
- Music by: Isao Tomita; The Helpful Soul
- Production company: Mushi Production
- Distributed by: Nippon Herald Films
- Release date: 14 June 1969
- Running time: 128 minutes
- Country: Japan
- Language: Japanese
- Box office: ¥290 million

A Thousand and One Nights (Japanese: 千夜一夜物語, Hepburn: Sen'ya Ichiya Monogatari) is a 1969 Japanese adult animated fantasy film directed by Eiichi Yamamoto, conceived by Osamu Tezuka. The film is the first part of Mushi Production's adult-oriented Animerama trilogy, and was followed by Cleopatra (1970) and Belladonna of Sadness (1973).

The film was a hit in Japan with distribution box-office revenue of ¥290 million, but was largely ignored outside of the domestic market, receiving a limited release in the US. The English dub of the film was considered lost until anime distributor Discotek Media discovered and restored it, releasing it on Blu-ray alongside the original Japanese version on 24 November 2020. The English-dubbed version was cut to 100 minutes and was recorded in Italy. The film predates the more successful release of Fritz the Cat, the first American X-rated animated film, by three years.

== Plot ==
Aldin, a poor, traveling water seller, falls in love with Miriam, a beautiful slave woman on auction in Baghdad, but Havasalakum, the son of the chief of police, buys her. Before he can take her home, a sandstorm interrupts the auction. Aldin uses the opportunity to steal away the slave woman, rescuing her from slavery. They hide from pursuing guards in a seemingly empty mansion. They have sex there and are secretly watched by the master of the mansion, Shalieman, who locks them in and commands them to continue.

Meanwhile, Badli, the right-hand man of the chief of police, brings a woman to the hideout of the forty thieves, where they party and have sex with her. Kamahakim, the leader of the forty thieves, disperses everyone, including his daughter, Madia. Frustrated at his father's actions, Madia leaves and goes swimming in the sea. There, she is interrupted by Badli, who shoots an arrow at a fish near her. When Madia emerges from the water, Badli is infatuated with her and tries to kiss her, but she slaps Badli in rejection. Enraged, Badli rapes Madia, who tearfully vows revenge to kill him.

That night, Havasalakum and his guards invade the mansion, where he finds them and captures Miriam. Badli murders Shalieman. Aldin is tortured and sent to prison by accusing him of Shalieman's murder. Meanwhile, a heartbroken Miriam dies in childbirth.

One year later, Aldin is free and meets Badli in the desert. Aldin threatens to kill him but shows him mercy and lets him leave. Aldin finds the magic cave where Kamahakim and the forty thieves hide their treasure. Aldin follows a thief inside, and as the thieves are asleep, he begins stealing the treasure. Madia awakens and threatens to kill Aldin in an attempt to get revenge against Badli, but he convinces her to see the world with him. Realizing her mistakes, Aldin and Madia fly away on a magic wooden horse to cross the ocean, only to be pulled down by living hair and drowned into the deep.

Aldin and Madia eventually find themselves ashore in the Lotus Island, which is home to beautiful Sirens. Their queen, Lamia, invites them to stay, but Madia becomes jealous and does not trust them. She leaves on the magic horse while Aldin stays and has sex with the sirens. Lamia forbids Aldin from following her into her house in the woods at night, but he still does so, and he is shocked as Lamia and the sirens transform into serpents. The serpents chase him, but Aldin flees from the island and is rescued by sailors. He travels with the sailors to a mysterious island, which is inhabited by a man-eating giant who eats most of the crew while Aldin survives. Aldin then finds a magical, sentient ship that will take him anywhere and fulfill almost any of his wishes.

15 years later, two genies on a carpet come across a shepherd named Aslan, whom the female genie falls for. In hopes of keeping the other genie from risking death by being seen by the shepherd, the male genie brings a beautiful princess named Jalis, who is from Baghdad, but teleports her away when things start going wrong. The male genie, in a huff, leaves the female genie, as she transforms into a horse to help Aslan go to Baghdad. When Aslan and Princess Jalis cross paths in the desert, the genie disappears.

Meanwhile, Aldin, now a rich man, enters a competition in Baghdad, the winner of which will become king. He wins the competition by tricking his opponent onto his magical ship, and by commanding the ship to take him to the end of the world. Aldin tries to use his power as the king to make Princess Jalis – who turns out to be Miriam's daughter – marry him, but she is in love with Aslan. Aldin commands the people to build a tower to heaven. The people hate him and revolt, led by Muhammad bin Sabaik, Aldin's second-in-command. Not prepared for the pressures of kingship, Aldin gives up the throne to travel the world as a poor man again, now seeing the value of freedom and peace.

== Cast ==
Cast
Character	Japanese	English
Aldin	Yukio Aoshima	Frederick Neumann
Miriam/Milliam	Kyouko Kishida	
Princess Jalis	Kyouko Kishida	
Badli	Hiroshi Akutagawa	Rolf Tasna
Aslan	Isao Hashizume	Mike Billingsley
Madia	Sachiko Itou	Susan Spafford
Djinn	Noboru Mitani	Gene Luotto
Genie	Haruko Katou	
Caliph Muhammad bin Sabaik IV		Michael Tor
Shalieman	Minoru Uchida	Robert Spafford
Queen Lamia	Takako Andō	Carolyn De Fonseca
Havasalakum		Ted Rusoff
Kamahakim	Asao Koike	Robert Sommer
Nursemaid	Reiko Niimura	Cicely Browne
Janir		Dan Sturkie
Slimon	Hitoshi Takagi	Mel Welles
Halimar	Tomoko Fumino	
Quack Doctor	Kuniyoshi Kizaki	
Ticket Scalper	Kyosen Oohashi	Frank von Kuegelgen
Race Spectators	Chinpei Nozue Danshi Tatekawa Takehiko Maeda	
Senators	Minoru Oomori Sen Saga Souichi Ooya	
Slave Bidders	Junnosuke Yoshiyuki Morio Kita Sakyou Komatsu Shuusaku Endou Yasutaka Tsutsui	
Master of Ceremonies		Frank von Kuegelgen

== Production ==
The Animerama series of adult animated feature films was conceived by Osamu Tezuka as an attempt to ensure animation could be accepted worldwide for all age groups and interests. This was in response to concerns about animation's reputation as being for children only. In addition to their erotic themes, they featured a mix of typical traditional animation with sequences of experimental uses of modern design, limited animation, and still paintings with influence from the UPA style and the works of Yōji Kuri. Elements within A Thousand and One Nights, such as the modeling of the main character on French actor, Jean-Paul Belmondo and the inclusion of rock music in the soundtrack underlined the aim to appeal to a worldwide market.

The team behind A Thousand and One Nights, consisted of many notable Mushi Production members such as Eichi Yamamoto as director, Osamu Dezaki as art director and Takashi Yanase as character designer. The film is primarily scored by rock band, The Helpful Soul and also featured music composed by Isao Tomita with an orchestra conducted by Seiji Yokoyama. A reported total of 60,000 production staff were hired and 70,000 motion pictures were used to produce the film. Tezuka also invited several prominent Japanese authors, such as science-fiction writers Sakyo Komatsu and Yasutaka Tsutsui, to voice minor characters in the film.

The story was developed by Osamu Tezuka, with credited assistance from Kazuo Fukasaka and Hiroyuki Kumai, loosely based on A Thousand Nights and A Night, the English translated version of One Thousand and One Nights by Richard Francis Burton.

== Reception ==
Trailer of the English dub of A Thousand and One Nights

A Thousand and One Nights was a critical success in Japan, performing well with a distribution box-office revenue of ¥290 million. However, outside the country, the film was largely ignored with the English dub release in the US being so limited it wasn't rated and audience reception being generally negative at the time of release, according to Cartoon Research.

Ethan Halker from ZekeFilm criticized the film citing issues with its failure at achieving "superbly sensual eroticism", at times slightly disjointed and meandering narrative, problematic stereotyping and sexism, and a myriad of technical errors. At the same time, he praised the film's creative experimentation with its various successful attempts at stylization and the compelling animation and soundtrack, calling A Thousand and One Nights "a bold, experimental, wonderful, messy, frustrating film".

Two commonly addressed issues with the film regard its depiction of women and the Middle East. Halker notes how the women of A Thousand and One Nights are largely illustrated as "helpless dolls, bitter victims, or literal snakes and man-eaters" and points out how they are mostly defined by their relationships with men. Cartoon Research and the Tezuka Osamu official website both cite scenes of the main character feasting on pork and drinking wine despite being a Muslim as problematic and detrimental to the film's appeal to Muslim audiences.

== See also ==
- Arabian Nights
- List of Osamu Tezuka anime
- List of animated feature-length films
