= Cleopatra (1970 film) =

1970 Japanese anime film

- Theatrical release poster

Japanese name
- Katakana: クレオパトラ
Transcriptions
- Revised Hepburn: Kureopatora
- Directed by: Osamu Tezuka; Eiichi Yamamoto
- Screenplay by: Shigemi Satoyoshi
- Story by: Osamu Tezuka
- Produced by: Yasuhiko Yoneyama
- Starring: Chinatsu Nakayama; Hajime Hana; Osami Nabe; Nachi Nozawa
- Cinematography: Katsuji Misawa
- Edited by: Masashi Furukawa
- Music by: Isao Tomita
- Production company: Mushi Production
- Distributed by: Nippon Herald Films
- Release dates: September 15, 1970 (Japan); April 24, 1972 (New York)
- Running time: 112 minutes
- Country: Japan
- Language: Japanese

Cleopatra (Japanese: クレオパトラ, Hepburn: Kureopatora) is a 1970 Japanese adult anime fantasy film directed by Osamu Tezuka and Eiichi Yamamoto. The film is the second part of Mushi Production's adult-oriented Animerama trilogy, following A Thousand and One Nights (1969) and preceding Belladonna of Sadness (1973).

The film follows a group of three humans to who time travel to ancient Egypt in an attempt to avert an alien invasion, but one of them attempts to flirt with Cleopatra in hopes of being remembered the greatest lover in history.

The film was a critical and commercial failure. A manga adaptation of the film, also from Tezuka and Hisashi Sakaguchi, was released later that same year in October exclusively in COM, and was reprinted in late 2018.

== Plot ==
In the far future, three humans—Jirō Tani, Hal Witcher, and Maria Fellow—discover that an alien race called the Pasateli intends to conquer humankind with the mysterious "Cleopatra Plan". Using a time machine, the three transport their minds into the bodies of members of the historical Cleopatra's court to discover and stop the plan. Hal, however, vows to use the opportunity to secure the title of the greatest lover who ever lived by having sex with Cleopatra.

In the middle of the Roman conquest of Egypt, a group of Egyptians secretly plot a rebellion to overthrow Julius Caesar. The group plans to send Cleopatra to seduce and murder Caesar. The Romans discover the group and attack them. Cleopatra escapes, along with her handmaidens Libya and Apollodoria. Cleopatra goes to an ancient priestess, who magically grants her an irresistibly seductive body for her mission.

It is at this point when Jirō, Hal, and Maria arrive: Maria is now Libya; Hal finds himself in the body of the priestess' leopard Rupa, thwarting his plans to seduce Cleopatra; and Jirō finds himself in the body of Ionius, a Greek man captured and enslaved by the Romans. Ionius frees himself and the other slaves by using his knowledge of future technology to make modern hand grenades. They accompany Cleopatra to meet Caesar, who is so overcome by her beauty that he makes her queen of Egypt. Caesar recaptures Ionius and, amused by his fighting skills, orders him to fight in the gladiatorial arena. He gives Ionius a modern-day handgun to ensure his victory. Ionius proves so popular with the Roman public that Caesar's own popularity soars, leading his senators to conspire to murder both him and Ionius to end their influence.

Libya and Apollodoria insist Cleopatra must murder Caesar; Cleopatra, however, has had a change of heart and keeps putting off the assassination in favor of sex. They accompany Caesar back to Rome, just in time for him to be assassinated by his own senators. Caesar's adopted son, Octavian—soon to be called Augustus—takes command. Cleopatra tries to continue the plan by seducing Octavian, only to learn that he is homosexual and impervious to her charms. Meanwhile, Caesar's right-hand man, Marcus Antonius or Anthony, falls in love and has sex with Cleopatra. Octavian, on the other hand, is attracted to Ionius and spares his life.

Finally, during the Battle of Actium where Octavian's fleet defeats Anthony's Egyptian fleet, Anthony kills himself. Octavian goes to Cleopatra to persuade her to surrender; she is taken into custody by the Romans. Distraught and disappointed by the rejection after Anthony's death, Cleopatra commits suicide using an asp's venomous bite.

The time travelers return to the future and report that the Cleopatra Plan is a scheme by the Pasateli to assume the form of beautiful human women to seduce and destroy Earth's most powerful male leaders. The Pasateli have already taken their human forms and are poised to strike when this information arrives, but Earth is able to root them out and save the world in time.

== Cast ==
- Chinatsu Nakayama as Cleopatra
- Hajime Hana as Julius Caesar
- Osami Nabe as Marcus Antonius
- Jitsuko Yoshimura as Maria Fellow/Libya
- Tsubame Yanagiya as Hal Witcher/Rupa
- Nobuo Tsukamoto as Jirō Tani/Ionius
- Kazuko Imai as Calpurnia
- Susumu Abe as Cabagonis
- Nachi Nozawa as Octavian
- Kotoe Hatsui as Apollodoria
- Yoshirō Katō as Chief Tarabahha

== Release ==
In 1972, Mushi Productions, who made the film, accepted a deal with Xanadu Productions Inc., a small distributor, to release a subtitled version of the film in the United States to try to save themselves from bankruptcy. When it was released in the United States, Xanadu changed the title to Cleopatra: Queen of Sex and released it with a self-applied X-rating on April 24, playing at the Bijou theatre and presumably other theatres. It was advertised as the first X-rated animated film in the United States, but Fritz the Cat came out with its X-rating from the MPAA before it on April 18 of the same year.

The film was not received well by audiences in America, and was not a success at the box office, due to false advertising claiming it to be a "pornographic" film, which caused people who saw the film to want refunds. It was not successful in its native Japan either.

Critics give it mixed reviews. Howard Thompson of The New York Times said it was basically a movie that involved "mostly a voluptuously drawn Cleopatra and a bevy of cuties that trot around bare-breasted", but praised the "lavish backgrounds" and some of the imagery and color. Variety called the film "partly sophomoric", with "emphasis on vulgar low comedy", but praised it for having good animation and color.

Cleopatra was not submitted to the MPAA, and might not have received an X-rating if it had been.

In its native country, it has been released on VHS, VHD, Laserdisc, and DVD (bundled with A Thousand and One Nights and Belladonna of Sadness or released separately) throughout the following years. Third Window Films released the film bundled with A Thousand and One Nights on Blu-ray for the first time and on DVD on June 18, 2018, for Region B and Region 2 territories. Discotek Media released the film on Blu-ray for Region A territories on October 27, 2020.

== See also ==
- List of Osamu Tezuka anime
