= The Amazing 3 =

Japanese comics and animated television series

- The cover of Wonder 3 volume 3 from the Osamu Tezuka Manga Complete Works edition, featuring Bokko

W3(ワンダースリー) (Wandā Surī)
- Genre: Science fiction
- Created by: Osamu Tezuka
- Manga
- Written by: Osamu Tezuka
- Published by: Kodansha
- Magazine: Weekly Shōnen Magazine
- Original run: 21 March 1965 – 25 April 1965
- Manga

Wonder 3
- Written by: Osamu Tezuka
- Published by: Shogakukan
- English publisher: US: Digital Manga
- Magazine: Weekly Shōnen Sunday
- Original run: 30 May 1965 – 8 May 1966
- Volumes: 3
- Anime television series
- Directed by: Taku Sugiyama
- Produced by: Keijiro Kurokawa; Tatsuo Ikeuchi
- Music by: Seiichirō Uno
- Studio: Mushi Productions
- Original network: Fuji TV
- English network: AU: Nine Network; US: Syndicated (non-network), KCOP-TV
- Original run: 6 June 1965 – 27 June 1966
- Episodes: 52
- icon

The Amazing 3, or Wonder 3 (Japanese: W3(ワンダースリー), Hepburn: Wandā Surī; read as "Wonder Three"), is a Japanese comic series and a black-and-white Japanese animated television series created by Osamu Tezuka in the 1960s. It involves the adventures of three agents from outer space who are sent to Earth to determine whether the planet, a potential threat to the universe, should be destroyed. Landing on Earth, the characters take the form of a rabbit, a horse, and a duck, and make friends with a young human boy.

The series was first published in print format as manga in Japan in 1965, and then spawned an animated television version, with different stories. The latter was dubbed in English and broadcast in the United States with a different theme song, as well as different closing and opening elements, under the title The Amazing 3. The American version was also aired in Australia in 1969 and in Spanish-speaking countries as Los tres espaciales. The Japanese-language animated version was first released on DVD in 2002, and then a full 10-DVD set in 2005.

The series tackles a number of issues that were unusual in animated cartoons of that period: in particular, ecological concerns and poverty and racial diversity.

In 2017, a Kickstarter campaign for an English translation of the manga from Digital Manga made $82,137. The manga was released in 2020, under the title Wonder 3.

== Plot ==
The Galactic Federation is concerned about the number of wars on the Planet Earth. It sends three agents to determine if the planet is a potential threat to the universe, and whether it should be destroyed. The instrument of destruction is a device resembling a large black ball with two antennae that is variously called an anti-proton bomb, a solar bomb, and a neutron bomb. The agents (Captain Bokko, Nokko, and Pukko) are originally humanoid in appearance, but upon arrival on Earth they take on the appearances of a rabbit (Bokko), a horse (Nokko), and a duck (Pukko) that they had captured as examples of Earth life forms. While on Earth they travel in a tire-shaped vehicle capable of enormous speeds called the Big Wheel, which can travel on both land and water (and, with modifications, through the air).

After landing, they are befriended by Shinichi Hoshi, a young boy who becomes their ally throughout the series. The series also features Shinichi's older brother, Kōichi, who is a member of the secret intelligence agency "Phoenix", formed to protect the peace of the world. The Wonder 3 are initially repulsed by the violence of the earthlings, especially Pukko, but gradually change their thinking after being touched by the kind personality of Shinichi.

In the final episode of the series the decision is made by the galactic council that mankind is irredeemable and that the Earth is to be destroyed. Although Pukko is in favor of this as much as ever, Bokko puts off the order as long as possible, and eventually decides to disobey the council's decision. However, prior to Bokko's decision to disobey her orders, Shinichi is appalled at the likelihood that his friends would obey the order and runs to Kōichi to ask Phoenix to intervene.

Although dozens of Phoenix agents fight the Amazing 3 in their saucer, they are unable to destroy it, and Shinichi appeals to Bokko, Nokko, and Pukko to take him back to their home planet to plead Earth's case. During the trip Bokko, Nokko, and Pukko revert to their humanoid forms for the first time, much to the surprise of Shinichi, who had never seen their true appearances before (perhaps not clearly, anyway – he had also seen them through the window of their saucer in the first episode, though it's suggested in the episode that he could only see their silhouettes).

Shinichi is particularly surprised by Bokko's beauty in her actual form. A3 are presented to the galactic council on charges of disobeying orders. Shinichi is given a chance to plead Earth's case and the council offers him the opportunity to stay on their planet with all the rights and privileges of other citizens. Shinichi becomes angry and attacks a guard, thus proving mankind's inherently violent nature to many there. The order is given to wipe out Shinichi's memories, but before this can be done Bokko pleads for him to be released, and for the Earth to be given more time to develop. The council eventually decides to return A3 to the Earth and re-examine the matter when Shinichi reaches adulthood.

Upon their return to Earth Pukko is ashamed of his attitude toward humans before that point, Shinichi is reunited with Kōichi, and Bokko is transformed by Nokko and Pukko into an Earth girl so she'll have a chance to be with Shinichi as the human girl she really wants to be – for a short time, anyway. The closing shot of the series is of the now-human Bokko walking towards Shinichi's home to find him.

== Characters ==
Bokko (ボッコ; Bonnie in the American version) is the cute one, and the brains of the group. She is capable of great powers of telepathy, telekinesis and hypnosis, has extremely sensitive hearing, and can also control the inner workings of machines by pressing her ears against them. She likes humans and sees no need to destroy the planet because of the actions of a few bad eggs. Despite the fact that in her humanoid form she is somewhat older than Shinichi (their human friend who is probably in his early teens, while she is probably in her 20s), and the fact that she's a rabbit in her animal form, her feelings for Shinichi are considerably more than platonic. Her deepest desire is to be an Earth girl so she can be with Shinichi. Voiced by: Fuyumi Shiraishi (Japanese); Bobbie Byers (English)

Nokko (ノッコ; Ronnie in the American version) is capable of creating inventions incredibly quickly, and is intensely speedy and tough in his horse appearance. Nokko would also prefer to see the Earth not destroyed – largely because he likes the food. He has a girlfriend named Felina who is also a member of the Galactic Patrol. She is seen once in the series when sent to Earth on a mission and takes on the form of a cat. Voiced by: Yasuo Kojima (Japanese); Neil Patrick (English)

Pukko (プッコ; Zero in the American version) is a curmudgeon with an occasional heart of gold, can generate shockwaves with his wings, and is also quite a capable guitarist. He is also quite a bit stronger than his duck appearance would suggest. He is the member of the Amazing 3 who is most in favor of destroying the Earth, and this increasingly brings him into conflict with Bokko as the series progresses, also criticizing her for her feelings regarding Shinichi (it's implied on occasion that he harbors his own feelings for Bokko). However, despite his attitude towards earthlings, Pukko is always willing to help the Amazing 3 and protect Shinichi. Pukko has what appears to be either a haircut or wig that resembles that worn by the Beatles or Moe Howard from the Three Stooges; probably added by Tezuka due to the Beatles' enormous popularity in Japan at the time. Voiced by: Shinsuke Chikaishi (Japanese); Paul Brown (English)

Bokko, Nokko, and Pukko are all conversant in Japanese – and apparently English – and can also talk to other animals. They also possess a gun called the time reversal gun. It can be used to reverse the flow of time in a small area.

Shinichi Hoshi (星真一, Hoshi Shin'ichi; Kenny Carter in the American version) is an Earth boy (named after Tezuka's longtime friend, the Japanese science fiction writer Shinichi Hoshi) who becomes their ally throughout the series. He is the only person who knows what they really are, or that they can talk. Shinichi's girlfriend Kanoko also figures prominently in the manga, but is absent from the anime, possibly because her presence would have detracted from Tezuka's plan for the ending of the series. Voiced by: Kazuko Sawada (Japanese); Kurt Nagel (English)

Kōichi Hoshi (星光一, Hoshi Kōichi; Randy Carter in the American version), Shinichi's older brother, is a secret agent for an organization called Phoenix, whose cover is a manga artist. His primary adversary is Interspy, though he also fights against others as well. He sometimes uses guns, but primarily relies on martial arts and his watch, which contains a small hammer and chain, a radar, and a flashlight, which can also be used as a beam to blind his opponents. His pipe also contains a smoke gas which can conceal his whereabouts. Within Phoenix, he is known as Agent P77. He is also a master of disguise. Kōichi joined Phoenix in order to avenge the death of a friend (who had previously been Agent P77) who had been killed by Interspy. The policy of Phoenix is to avoid violence when possible, but recognizes that it's sometimes unavoidable. Voiced by: Yoshio Kanauchi (Japanese); Kurt Nagel (English)

There are three main supporting characters. Shinichi and Kōichi's mother is voiced by Ryoko Sakurai in the Japanese version. She is a heavyset and domineering woman. Shinichi and Kōichi's father and mother operate a small hotel. Their father is something of a milquetoast. The third major supporting character is the mysterious M, the head of Phoenix and the person from whom Kōichi takes orders. Only the back of his head is ever seen.

== Anime ==
W3 aired in Japan on Fuji TV from June 6, 1965, until June 27, 1966, for a total of 52 episodes. The American version of the series, The Amazing 3, was released in syndication through Erika Productions in 1967. It aired on KCOP-TV (Channel 13) in Los Angeles, California, and on WPIX-TV (Channel 11) in New York, New York. The series was also dubbed into Spanish and broadcast in Spanish-speaking countries as Los tres espaciales.

This series was the first Tezuka production in which Tezuka adopted a method of animation which had long been used by Disney and Warner Brothers in which each animator was responsible for drawing a single character instead of the team of animators each taking a piece of a show and drawing everything.

The premise of both the manga and the anime was the same, and the characters looked nearly identical in both, but the stories differed greatly. Stories which appeared in the manga were not used again for the anime – and vice versa. In addition, the manga version has Shinichi's school friends and teachers playing more of a role than they would in the anime.

=== Production ===
The series originated as a means of retaining 25 temporarily unoccupied employees during the rapid expansion of the Japanese television animation industry. Fearing that other studios would recruit them if they were laid off, Osamu Tezuka assigned them to work on The Amazing 3 in a nearby apartment until their services were needed for the production of Kimba the White Lion.

=== Pilot ===
In the pilot for the series, a few characters looked slightly different. Bokko's appearance was more rabbit-like and less feminine, and she didn't yet have the black tips on her ears, or the tuft of black hair on her head. Pukko didn't have his Beatle haircut. And Kōichi looked much the same, but his face was altered slightly for the series. The pilot for the series is largely the same as the first episode – and some footage was reused for the first episode – but differs in a few respects; mostly with regards to how Bokko, Nokko, and Pukko first meet Shinichi. It is also only about 15 minutes long, and ends with Kōichi's discovery of a hidden base, which isn't part of the first episode.

=== Theme music ===
Unlike Astro Boy, where the opening theme music was the same in both the Japanese and American versions (with only the lyrics changed), the Japanese and American versions of The Amazing 3 had different theme music, as well as considerably different opening and closing segments. The American version borrowed part of its melody from the Japanese version. The Japanese theme (sung by a group called Vocal Shop) was considerably more playful and complex than the American version.

=== Episodes ===
No.	Title	Original release date
1	"Three Beings from Outer Space" "Uchū kara no Sanbiki" (宇宙からの三匹)	June 6, 1965
2	"Evacuation in 24 Hours" "Nijūyon Jikan no Dasshutsu" (24時間の脱出)	June 13, 1965
3	"The Mystery of Shangri-La" "Shanguri-Ra no Nazo" (シャングリラの謎)	June 20, 1965
4	"Camphor Tree Story" "Kusunoki Monogatari" (くすの木物語)	June 27, 1965
5	"The Floating Fortress" "Ukabu Yōsaitō" (浮ぶ要塞島)	July 4, 1965
6	"Zoo on a Skyscraper" "Matenrō Dōbutsuen" (摩天楼動物園)	July 11, 1965
7	"The Queen of Siva" "Shiba no Joō" (シバの女王)	July 18, 1965
8	"Phantom of the Circus" "Sākasu no Kaijin" (サーカスの怪人)	July 25, 1965
9	"Sun, Don't Set" "Shizumuna Taiyō" (沈むな太陽)	August 1, 1965
10	"The Mummy Factory" "Mīra Kōjo" (ミイラ工場)	August 8, 1965
11	"The Duel in the North Valley" "Kita no Tani no Kettō" (北の谷の決闘)	August 15, 1965
12	"Mole Plan" "Moguramochi Keikaku" (モグラモチ計画)	August 22, 1965
13	"The Iron-Eating Fish" "Shokutetsugyo" (食鉄魚)	August 29, 1965
14	"Fort of the Wild Dogs" "Yaken no Toride" (野犬の砦)	September 5, 1965
15	"Sacrifices Will Not Be Tolerated" "Gisei ha Yurusarenai" (犠牲は許されない)	September 12, 1965
16	"My Name is X" "Wa ga Na wa Ekkusu" (我が名はエックス)	September 19, 1965
17	"Black Extract" "Kuroi Ekisu" (黒いエキス)	September 26, 1965
18	"Explode the Barn" "Sairo Bakuhase yo" (サイロ爆破せよ)	October 3, 1965
19	"The Phoenix Story" "Fenikkusu Monogatari" (フェニックス物語)	October 10, 1965
20	"The Mad Target" "Kurutta Hyōteki" (狂った標的)	October 17, 1965
21	"Adventure in the Volcano" "Kazan no Tsuiseki" (火山の追跡)	October 24, 1965
22	"The Dangerous Stage" "Kiken na Sutēji" (危険なステージ)	October 31, 1965
23	"Duel in the Storm" "Arashi no Taiketsu" (嵐の対決)	November 7, 1965
24	"The Mysterious Inventor" "Nazo no Hatsumeika" (謎の発明家)	November 14, 1965
25	"The Deadly Auto Race" "Shi no Jidōsha Rēsu" (死の自動車レース)	November 21, 1965
26	"The Transocean Tunnel" "Kaitei ni Kakeru Hashi" (海底にかける橋)	November 28, 1965
27	"Invitation of the Diamonds" "Daiyamondo e no Shōtai" (ダイヤモンドへの招待)	December 5, 1965
28	"Valley of the Thunderbolt" "Inazuma Chitai" (稲妻地帯)	December 12, 1965
29	"A Day Blotted Out" "Ushinawareta Ichinichi" (失われた一日)	December 19, 1965
30	"The Penguin Campaign" "Pengin Sakusen" (ペンギン作戦)	December 26, 1965
31	"Something Very Strange" "Kiki Kaikai" (奇々怪々)	January 2, 1966
32	"The Kiddie Battle" "Wanpaku Kassen" (ワンパク合戦)	January 9, 1966
33	"Four Witches" "Yonin no Majo" (四人の魔女)	January 16, 1966
34	"The Snow Fairy" "Yuki Onna" (雪女)	January 23, 1966
35	"The One-Eyed Gray Wolf" "Katame no Haiiro Ōkami" (片目の灰色狼)	January 30, 1966
36	"The Pledge in the Jungle" "Janguru no Chikai" (ジャングルの誓い)	February 7, 1966
37	"The Mystery of the Amazon" "Amazon no Nazo" (アマゾンの謎)	February 14, 1966
38	"The Horrifying Skiing Competition" "Kyōfu no Sukī Taikai" (恐怖のスキー大会)	February 21, 1966
39	"The Hero in the Desert" "Sabaku no Eiyū" (砂漠の英雄)	February 28, 1966
40	"The Secret of the Grand Piano" "Nazo no Piano" (謎のピアノ)	March 7, 1966
41	"Jump out, Pukko!" "Tobidase Pukko" (飛び出せプッコ)	March 14, 1966
42	"The Wonder 3 Go West" "Wandā Surī Seibu o Yuku" (W3西部を行く)	March 21, 1966
43	"Mice from the Universe" "Uchū kara Kita Nezumitachi" (宇宙から来たネズミたち)	March 28, 1966
44	"The Moving Buddha" "Ugoku Daibutsuzō" (動く大仏像)	April 4, 1966
45	"The Satellite Swag" "Jinkō Eisei Dorobō Keikaku" (人工衛星ドロボー計画)	April 11, 1966
46	"The Alligator Incident" "Dai Wani Sōdō" (大ワニ騒動)	April 18, 1966
47	"The Mexican Bandits" "Kutabare Tekīra" (くたばれテキーラ)	April 25, 1966
48	"Adventures on a Balloon" "Kiken na Fūsen Ryokō" (危険な風船旅行)	2 May 1966
49	"The Smog Missile" "Sumoggu Misairu" (スモッグミサイル)	9 May 1966
50	"Beat Them with the Strange Machine" "Henteko Mashīn de Yattsukeru" (ヘンテコマシーンでやっつけろ)	16 May 1966
51	"The Underground Whale" "Chitei no Kujira" (地底の鯨)	23 May 1966
52	"Goodbye, Wonder 3" "Sayōnara Wandā Surī" (さようならW3)	27 June 1966

=== Revival attempt ===
There was a brief report from the 2000 Anime Expo in Anaheim, California, that Studio Pierrot and a newer company called Digital Manga were considering the idea of teaming up and producing a new version of the series to be streamed on the Internet. The product was released by eManga as 'Wonder 3 Omnibus'.

== Availability ==
The complete Japanese-language manga is available in two volumes. A late 1970s three-volume set can also sometimes be found.

During the 1990s, the series was available in Japan both on two sets of laserdiscs and on a series of thirteen VHS videocassettes. The series was first released on DVD in Japan in two volumes in 2002 and 2003. A complete single-volume 10-DVD set was released in 2005. A lower priced (¥15,000) 10-DVD set was released for a limited time in 2008 in honor of what would have been Tezuka's 80th birthday. Though the negatives for the series were damaged in a warehouse flood, the episodes on the Japanese DVDs were taken from the best existing sources.

Many of the American (English-dubbed) episodes are considered lost. The English dubbed version had aired on KCOP-TV in Los Angeles from 1967 to 1970. as of June 2020, 30 of the 52 translated episodes have been found. The English-dubbed version of the series also aired on Australia's Channel 9 beginning in 1969. Anime Sols, which closed officially on May 1, 2015, attempted to crowdfund the streaming rights for an official English-subtitled version of the show.

== Reception ==
Manga artist Hirohiko Araki called himself a fan, and counted it among his favorite Tezuka works.

Although Clements and McCarthy characterized The Amazing 3 as a minor series in Tezuka's body of work, they noted that it received unusually extensive media attention during its original broadcast, appearing twice on the cover of the Japanese television listings magazine TV Guide.

== Legacy ==
According to Jonathan Clements and Helen McCarthy, writing in the third edition of The Anime Encyclopedia (2015), noted that Tezuka revisited similar narrative ideas in his 1981 animated television film Bremen 4: Angels in Hell.

=== Other appearances ===
- Pukko had made a brief appearance (recolored brown) in Episode 26 of Astro Boy (1980). The story also brought together an adult Princess Sapphire with guest appearances by Black Jack and Pinoko. The episode was notable for being Black Jack's third televised appearance and for bringing a belated unofficial closure to the series Princess Knight (although how Pukko ended up in 15th Century Europe is anyone's guess).
- Pukko also made background cameo appearances in two television movies, first as one of Ban's puppets (this time, recolored green) in the 1981 television film Bremen 4: Angels in Hell, the fourth Tezuka Productions special, and then as one of the denizens of the border planet Scarabe in the 1986 film Galaxy Investigation 2100: Border Planet, the seventh Tezuka Productions special (he was with the cantina patrons on the newly constructed transporter ship that was to take them off the planet and journey to a new home among the stars).
- Bokko, Nokko, and Pukko make a cameo appearance in the 2004 game Astro Boy: Omega Factor. this time with a more antagonistic role compared to his depiction in the manga and television series and with a circle-shaped spaceship instead of their UFO.

== See also ==
- List of Osamu Tezuka manga
- List of Osamu Tezuka anime
- Osamu Tezuka's Star System
