= Belladonna of Sadness =

1973 Japanese anime art film

- Theatrical release poster

Japanese name
- Kanji: 哀しみのベラドンナ
Transcriptions
- Revised Hepburn: Kanashimi no Beradonna
- Directed by: Eiichi Yamamoto
- Screenplay by: Yoshiyuki Fukuda; Eiichi Yamamoto
- Based on: Satanism and Witchcraft by Jules Michelet
- Produced by: Tadami Watanabe; Teruaki Yoshida; Makoto Motohashi; Keiko Koike
- Starring: Tatsuya Nakadai; Aiko Nagayama; Katsutaka Ito; Masaya Takahashi; Masakane Yonekura
- Narrated by: Chinatsu Nakayama
- Cinematography: Shigeru Yamazaki
- Edited by: Masashi Furukawa
- Music by: Masahiko Satoh
- Layouts by: Kuni Fukai
- Production company: Mushi Production
- Distributed by: Nippon Herald Films
- Release dates: June 27, 1973 (Berlin); June 30, 1973 (Japan)
- Running time: 86 minutes
- Country: Japan
- Language: Japanese

Belladonna of Sadness (Japanese: 哀しみのベラドンナ, Hepburn: Kanashimi no Beradonna) (Note: The film is also known as La Sorcière, Tragedy of Belladonna, or simply Belladonna. The film's title card bears, in addition to the Japanese title, the Latin alphabet title La Sorcière (that of the sourcebook in its original language). The original trailer, posters and video boxes use Belladonna as the film's Latin-character title. Mushi Production's website and at least one online review uses Tragedy of Belladonna.) is a 1973 Japanese adult animated drama film produced by Mushi Production and distributed by Nippon Herald Films. It is the third and final installment in the studio's adult-oriented Animerama trilogy, following A Thousand and One Nights (1969) and Cleopatra (1970). Set in a stylized medieval European setting and inspired in part by the French work Satanism and Witchcraft by Jules Michelet, the film reflects the studio’s late-period shift toward experimental, artistically oriented feature animation for adult audiences.

The narrative follows Jeanne, a peasant woman whose life is shattered after she is raped by local feudal authorities on the night of her wedding. In her desperation, she enters into a Faustian pact with a mysterious demonic entity that promises her power and prosperity. As Jeanne rises from poverty and marginalization, her growing influence provokes suspicion and fear, ultimately leading to accusations of witchcraft and violent persecution.

The film is notable for its unconventional visual approach, which combines limited animation with elaborate watercolor illustrations, graphic design elements, and extended still compositions. Its imagery blends erotic, religious, violent and psychedelic motifs, while the narrative addresses themes of misogyny, feudal oppression, sexual control, social revolt and witch-hunt hysteria, presenting Jeanne’s transformation as both a personal tragedy and a broader allegory of power and resistance.

Upon its release, Belladonna of Sadness was a commercial failure, contributing to the financial collapse of Mushi Production shortly thereafter. In later decades, however, the film was rediscovered through festival screenings and restoration efforts, leading to a critical reappraisal. It has since come to be regarded as a cult film and is frequently cited as a significant work in the history of experimental animation and adult-oriented animated cinema.

== Plot ==
Jeanne and Jean are newlyweds in a rural village in medieval France. On Jeanne's wedding night, she is brutally gang-raped in a ritual deflowering by the local baron and his courtiers. She returns to Jean terrified, and he attempts to calm her by saying they can start over from that moment. Shortly after they embrace, however, Jean strangles Jeanne to a state of unconsciousness. Distraught and ashamed, he flees outside their home.

That night, Jeanne begins to see visions of a phallic-headed spirit who promises her power. The spirit tells her it heard her calling for help, and that it can grow as big and powerful as she wants it to. As a result, the couple's fortunes rise even as famine strikes the village, and the baron raises taxes to fund his war effort. Formerly exhausted by his life of menial labor, Jean is elevated to the role of tax collector, but the baron cuts off Jean's hand as punishment when he cannot extract enough money from the village, leaving him miserable and drunk.

The spirit visits Jeanne once again (having grown in size) and rapes her in exchange for more riches. Although she submits her body, she attests that her soul still belongs to Jean and God. Shortly thereafter, Jeanne takes out a large loan from a usurer and sets herself up in the same trade, eventually becoming the true power in the village. The baron returns victorious from his war, and his wife, envious of the respect and admiration Jeanne receives, calls her a witch and rallies the villagers to turn against her. Running from the mob, Jeanne tries to return home, but Jean is drunk and doesn't open the door, and she is assaulted.

That evening, when soldiers come to arrest her, she flees into the nearby forest. In the wilderness, she finally makes a deal with the spirit, who reveals himself to be the Devil. She is granted magical powers, and returns to find the village has been infected with the bubonic plague. Jeanne uses her powers to create a cure for the disease, and the village flocks to her for aid. Having won their favor, Jeanne presides over orgiastic rites among the villagers.

A page who falls in love with the baron's wife begs Jeanne to help him seduce her. She gives him a love potion that causes the baron's wife to accept his advances, but the baron catches his wife sleeping with the page and kills them both. Perturbed by Jeanne's power, the baron sends Jean to invite her to a meeting. The couple reconciles, and Jeanne accepts the invitation. In exchange for sharing her cure for the plague, the baron offers to make Jeanne the second-highest noble in the land, but she refuses, saying she wishes to take over the entire world.

Angered at her refusal, the baron orders Jeanne to be burned at the stake. Jean is killed by the baron's soldiers when he tries to retaliate, which angers the villagers. As Jeanne is burned, the faces of the female villagers transform into Jeanne's, fulfilling a priest's warning that if a witch is burnt while her pride is intact, her soul will survive and spread to influence everyone around her. Centuries later, the influence of Jeanne's spirit initiated the French Revolution.

== Cast ==
- Aiko Nagayama as Jeanne
- Katsutaka Ito as Jean
- Tatsuya Nakadai as the Devil
- Masaya Takahashi as Milord
- Shigako Shimegi as Milady
- Masakane Yonekura as Catholic Priest
- Chinatsu Nakayama as Narrator

== Production and release ==
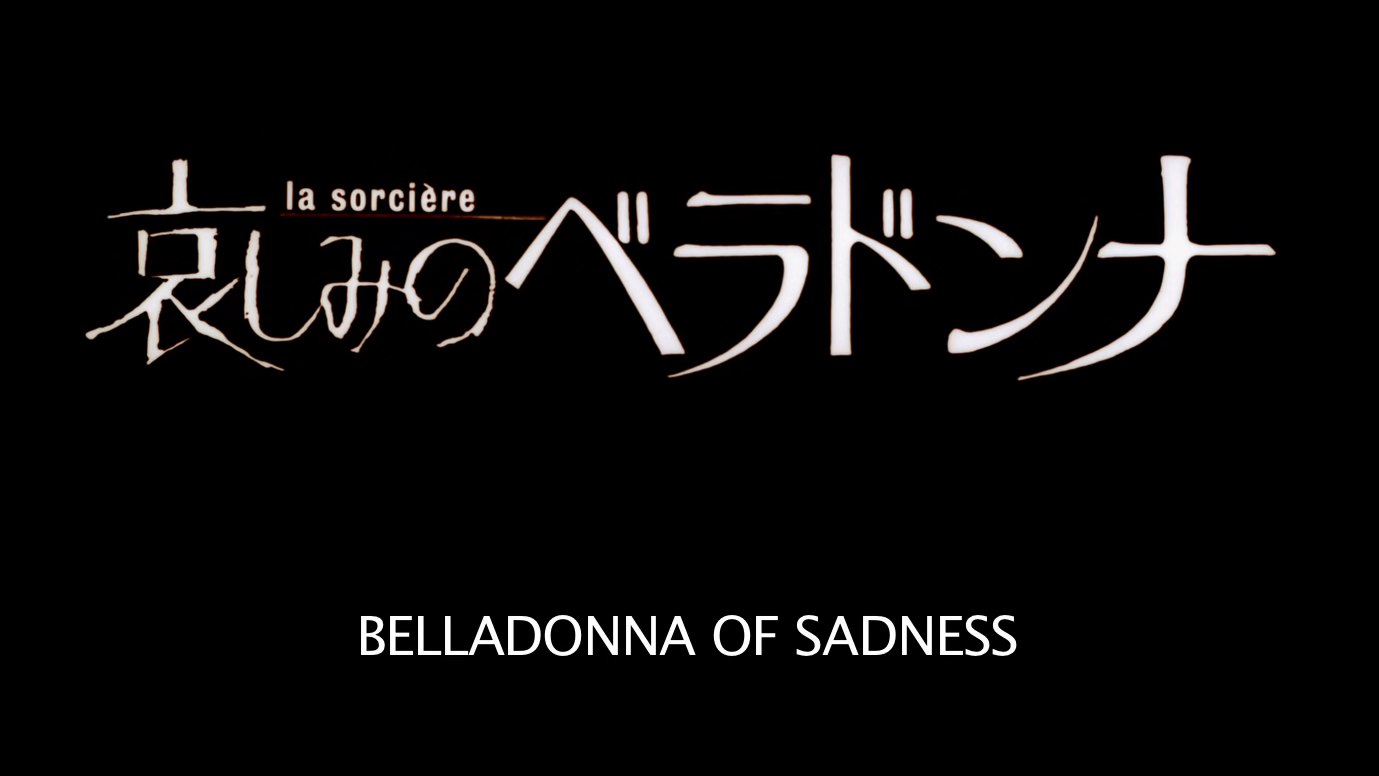
English-subtitled still of the film's title card, showing the Japanese title, 哀しみのベラドンナ, the original Roman-character title, La Sorcière, and the English title of the 4K restored version, Belladonna of Sadness.

Belladonna of Sadness is directed and co-written by Eiichi Yamamoto and inspired by Jules Michelet's 1862 non-fiction book La Sorcière. It is the only film in the Animerama trilogy to have been neither written nor co-directed by Osamu Tezuka (he left during the film's early stages in 1971 to concentrate on his manga, and his conceptual-stage contribution is uncredited). Belladonna is also of a more serious tone than the more comedic first two Animerama films. According to Jason DeMarco of Paste Magazine, its visuals consist mostly of still paintings panned across "with occasional expressive bursts of color and movement scattered throughout". Jasper Sharp of Midnight Eye also observed that its visuals, designed by illustrator Kuni Fukai, resemble modernist and Art Nouveau painters such as Gustav Klimt, Aubrey Beardsley, Odilon Redon, Alphonse Mucha, Egon Schiele and Félicien Rops. Production of the film lasted from 1967 to 1973. The film was a commercial failure and contributed to Mushi Pro going bankrupt by the end of the year. The film was entered into the 23rd Berlin International Film Festival.

The film had general releases in some mainland European countries as well as Japan, and some one-off screenings the United States, including in 2009, and underwent a 4K digital restoration for theatrical release in May 2016. In August 2016, Hat & Beard Press released a companion book containing illustrations, script outtakes, film stills and staff interviews.

Eugène Delacroix's 1830 painting Liberty Leading the People is featured in the end of the film.

The restoration was screened on July 10, 2015, in a preview at Japan Cuts, and then played on September 24 at Fantastic Fest in Austin before a theatrical run beginning on May 6, 2016, in New York City and San Francisco.

Because of the film's obscurity, various sources list its running time as anywhere from 86 to 93 minutes. Cinelicious Pics clarified in May 2016 that its 86-minute restoration represented the correct running time, saying that this length had been cut down by approximately eight minutes for an unsuccessful re-release in Japan in 1979 (with the addition of the brief ending shot of Eugène Delacroix's painting Liberty Leading the People, which was not in the original version, but Cinelicious left it in the restored version). Cinelicious restored the censored footage from the sole surviving 35 mm release print of the full-length version at the Cinematek in Belgium, which agreed to do a 4K scan of the missing sections from their print. It has received generally favorable reviews from contemporary film critics.

Discotek Media picked up the license to the film in 2023 and they released the film on 4K Ultra HD Blu-ray on May 28, 2024.

== Reception ==
Belladonna of Sadness holds a 90% approval rating on the review aggregator website Rotten Tomatoes based on 41 reviews, with an average rating of 7.80/10. The site's critical consensus reads: "Belladonna of Sadness has more than enough brilliant visual artistry to keep audiences enraptured even as the film's narrative reach slightly exceeds its grasp". On Metacritic, the film has a weighted average score of 70 out of 100 based on 12 critic reviews, indicating "generally favorable reviews".

In 2016, Charles Solomon of the Los Angeles Times reviewed the film, calling it dated by today's standards and saying that it "looks exploitative and misogynistic 43 years later".

== See also ==
- List of animated feature films of 1973
