= Eiichi Yamamoto =

Japanese film director (1940–2021)

- 山本 暎一
- Born: 22 November 1940; Kyoto Prefecture, Japan
- Died: 7 September 2021 (aged 80)
- Occupations: Film director, screenwriter, animator
- Years active: 1959–2001

Eiichi Yamamoto (山本 暎一, Yamamoto Eiichi; 22 November 1940 – 7 September 2021) was a Japanese film director and screenwriter of anime. He is known for directing the Animerama film series conceived by Osamu Tezuka. Yamamoto directed ten films between 1962 and 1986. His 1973 film Kanashimi no Belladonna was entered into the 23rd Berlin International Film Festival. Besides film work, Yamamoto also served as screenwriter on the anime television series Space Battleship Yamato and wrote the screenplay for its 1977 film adaptation.

== Selected filmography ==
- Tales of the Street Corner (1962) (director, editing)
- Astro Boy (1963) (director, writer) (TV)
- Kimba the White Lion (1966) (director, producer, writer) (TV)
- A Thousand and One Nights (1969) (director)
- Cleopatra (1970) (director)
- Kanashimi no Belladonna (1973) (director, writer)
- Little Wansa (1973) (director) (TV)
- Space Battleship Yamato (1974-1975) (supervising director, writer) (TV)
- Space Battleship Yamato (1977) (screenplay)
- Oshin (1984) (director)
- Odin: Photon Sailer Starlight (1985) (director, screenplay)
- Pelican Road Club Culture (1986) (director, screenplay)
- The Sensualist (1991) (screenplay)
- Izumo (1991) (director, screenplay)
- Tsuki ga Noboru made ni (1991) (director, screenplay, storyboard)
