= Hinotori =

Hinotori (Japanese for Phoenix) may refer to:

- Hinotori (satellite), an astronomical satellite
- Hinotori (video game), a 1987 video game
- "Hinotori" (song), 1998 song by Fanatic Crisis
- Hino Tori, a manga series by Osamu Tezuka
- The brand name of the Kintetsu 80000 series train type
- "HINOTORI", a song by Takanashi Kiara of Hololive English from her album Point of View
