= Toshiko Ueda =

Japanese manga artist (1917–2008)

- 上田 トシコ
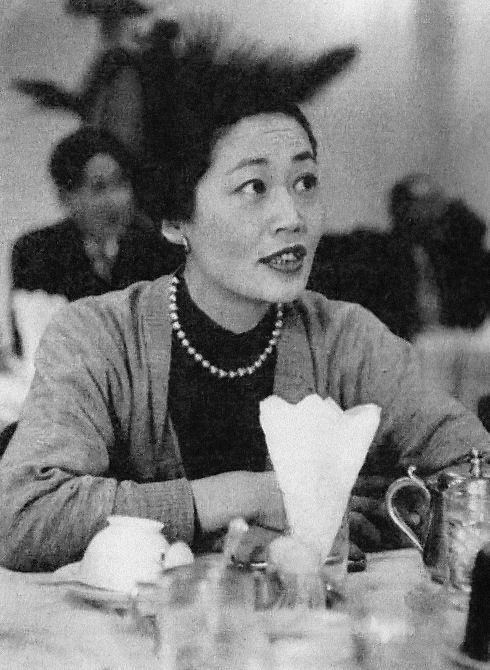
- Ueda c. 1956
- Born: August 14, 1917; Tokyo City, Empire of Japan
- Died: March 7, 2008 (aged 90); Tokyo, Japan
- Occupation: Manga artist
- Years active: 1937–2008
- Notable work: Fuichin-san
- Awards: Shogakukan Manga Award (1959); Japan Cartoonists Association Award (1989 & 2003)

Toshiko Ueda (Note: Born Toshiko Ueda (上田俊子), the artist used three pen names throughout her career, all of which read as "Ueda Toshiko" but with different spellings: 上田としこ, used for her manga; 上田とし子, used for newspaper work; and; 上田トシコ, used in her later career.) (Japanese: 上田 トシコ, Hepburn: Ueda Toshiko; August 14, 1917 – March 7, 2008) was a Japanese manga artist. After apprenticing under the manga artist Katsuji Matsumoto at the age of seventeen, Ueda published her first manga in 1937. Like her mentor, she drew mainly humorous manga, both in shōjo (girls) magazines and in the general press. She is, along with Machiko Hasegawa, one of the few female manga artists to begin their careers in the pre-war period.

Born in the Empire of Japan, Ueda split her youth and early adulthood between Japan and Manchuria; her most popular manga series Fuichin-san, serialized in the magazine Shōjo Club from 1957 to 1962, follows the life of a Chinese girl living in Manchuria. Ueda's time in Manchuria, from her idyllic childhood to the arrest and execution of her father during Japanese repatriation, was a significant influence on her manga. She was still actively publishing her manga series Ako-Bāchan (1973–2008) at the time of her death at the age of 90.

== Biography ==
=== Early life (1917–1934) ===
Toshiko Ueda was born on August 14, 1917, in Tokyo City. She moved with her parents to Harbin, Manchuria (located in present day China), several days after her birth, where her father worked as a businessman for the South Manchuria Railway Company. Ueda grew up in Harbin, where she lived with her parents, an older sister, a younger brother, and a servant, and learned to speak both Japanese and Chinese. When Ueda finished elementary school in 1929, she returned to Tokyo to study at the Shoei Girls' Junior and Senior High School. While attending school in Tokyo, Ueda discovered the manga series Poku-chan (ポクちゃん) by Katsuji Matsumoto in the manga magazine Shōjo Gahō, which inspired her to become a manga artist. At the time, manga artistry was a male-dominated profession; it was thus an unusual career for a woman to pursue, and one that Ueda's father did not approve of.

=== Debut and departure from manga (1935–1950) ===
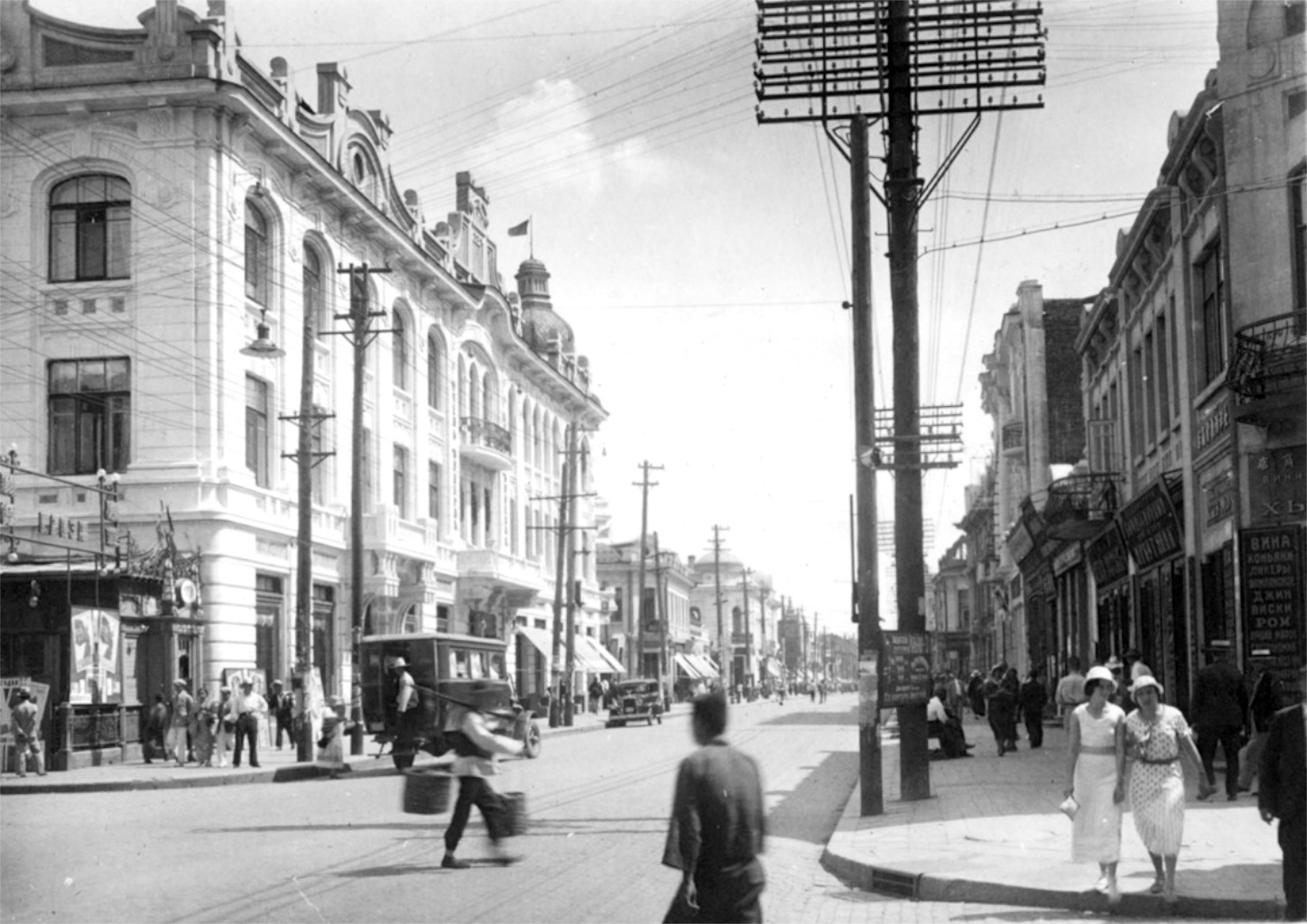
Harbin, pre-1940

In 1935, at the age of seventeen, Ueda met Matsumoto through an acquaintance of her brother and convinced him to take her on as an apprentice. Through this apprenticeship, Ueda published illustrations in the magazine Shōgaku Rokunensei published by Shogakukan, and in 1937 published her first manga series Kamuro-san (かむろさん) in Shōjo Gahō. This makes Ueda one of the earliest published female manga artists, preceded by Machiko Hasegawa, who made her debut two years earlier in 1935. Following Kamuro-san, Ueda illustrated the series Buta to Kūnyan (ブタとクーニャン), which was serialized in the daily Tokyo newspaper Tokyo Nichi Nichi Shimbun for a year.

Upon the conclusion of Buta to Kūnyan, Ueda joined a yōga (western-style painting) workshop to develop her artistic technique, where she studied with painters Junkichi Mukai and Conrad Meili. She continued to create illustrations and manga for various magazines while living in Tokyo. In 1943 she suffered a decline in health, and the manga artist Hidezō Kondō told her that she was too "naive" to be a manga artist and that she should "work and see the world". Subsequently, she decided to leave Japan to return to her family in Harbin.

In Harbin, Ueda worked for the South Manchuria Railway Company and later for a local newspaper, while also working as a freelance poster illustrator. Following the Soviet invasion of Manchuria in 1945 and subsequent takeover of Manchuria by the Eighth Route Army, the Ueda family took refuge with Chinese friends until 1946, after which they were forced to flee. Ueda and her family returned to Japan, though her father was imprisoned after being accused of economic war crimes as part of his work with the South Manchuria Railway Company. Ueda's father was executed after several days in detention, though the Ueda family did not learn of his death until three years later.

Upon returning to Japan in 1946, Ueda was hired by NHK, Japan's public broadcaster, where she worked under the Civil Information and Education (CIE) department of the Supreme Allied Command. Simultaneously, she worked as an illustrator and manga artist, publishing Okinu-chan (お絹ちゃん) and Meiko Hogaraka Nikki (メイコ朗らか日記) in the magazine Shōjo Romance in 1949. Shōjo Romance folded in 1951, and she resigned from NHK after the broadcaster asked her to relocate to the United States for work. During this time she also married, but was unable to accept her new role as a housewife, and divorced shortly thereafter.

=== Return to manga and later life (1951–2008) ===
By the early 1950s, an increasing proportion of manga artists were women, allowing Ueda to return to the career as a full-time profession. In 1951 she published the manga series Boku-chan (ぼくちゃん) in the magazine Shōjo Book, followed by Bonko-chan (ぼんこちゃん) in the magazine Ribon from 1955 to 1961; the popularity of the latter series was such that its heroine became the magazine's mascot for the duration of its serialization. From 1957 to 1962, Ueda published the manga series Fuichin-san in the magazine Shojo Club, which would become her best-known work; the protagonist of the story was similarly the mascot of the magazine for the duration of its publication run. The success of Boku-chan and Fuichin-san allowed Ueda to contribute frequently to shōjo magazines and the general press, though she remained generally less successful than her colleague and shōjo pioneer Machiko Hasegawa. Beginning in 1973, Ueda began to focus solely on serializing the manga series Ako-Bāchan (あこバアチャン) in the magazine Ashita no Tomo, a lifestyle magazine for older women.

On March 7, 2008, Ueda died from heart failure at her home in Tokyo at the age of 90. She was still actively serializing Ako-Bāchan at the time of her death.

== Style ==
=== Subjects and tone ===
A page from Ueda's manga series Fuichin-san (1957–1962). Ueda's works are generally light-hearted, energetic, and humorous.

Ueda's manga is generally light-hearted, energetic, and humorous, with the artist stating that her repatriation from Manchuria taught her that "humor is the food of the mind". Her works are typically slice of life stories with a comedic or educational tone, with the author stating that in order to create these works she kept abreast of current events, ranging from politics to sports to the price of supermarket products. She reported frequently reading newspapers, spending time shopping, and talking to people in order to discover potential subjects for her manga.

As the titles of most of Ueda's works are constructed from the name of the protagonist with an honorific suffix – Fuichin-san, Bonko-chan, Ohatsu-chan, etc. – she earned the industry nickname "mangaka chan-chan".

=== Visual style ===
Having begun drawing manga prior to the war under the patronage of Katsuji Matsumoto and other western-style painters, Ueda belongs to a school of manga artist pre-dating Osamu Tezuka. Her style is distinct from that of Tezuka's, whose cinematic style of illustration characterized by closeups and cutbacks came to define the look of manga from the 1950s and beyond, as well as manga of the 1950s generally. Artist Yoshitomo Nara notes that influence of western painting on Ueda's manga gives her linework an "artistic", "timeless" and more "modern" character than most manga of the 1950s, comparing character features drawn by Ueda to the curves of sculptures created by Auguste Rodin.

=== Depictions of Manchuria ===
Manchuria, as the site of both her childhood and her father's death, is an important region in the work of Ueda, and significantly influenced her work. The author never returned to former Manchuria following her repatriation, though she visited China several times after the war. Fuichin-san, Ueda's most popular work, is set in Manchuria during the Japanese occupation, and depicts the region as bright, prosperous, and cosmopolitan. The primary characters, Fuichin and Li Chu, are Chinese, while the other characters in the work are primarily Chinese or Russian, with few Japanese characters. Japanese literature scholar Yoriko Kume sees Fuichin-san as an attempt by the author to transcend reality by depicting an idyllic world where conflict between nations and the ills of colonialism do not exist. Yoshitomo Nara argues that the series is an expression of humanism, depicting a world of children who are not yet aware of racial and ethnic prejudice.

Outside of her manga, Ueda spoke about her experience in Manchuria in the 1995 book Boku no Manshū ("My Manchuria"), in which various manga artists (including Tetsuya Chiba and Fujio Akatsuka) discuss their experiences in the region and their repatriation. Ueda also participated in the development of, and drew illustrations for, Ineko Sata's novel Omoki Nagare Ni (重き流れに); Sata is a friend of the Ueda family, and based the novel on the family's history in Manchuria.

== Legacy and impact ==
Toshiko Ueda was, along with Machiko Hasegawa, one of the few female manga artists to begin their careers in the pre-war period. Her output as a manga artist was generally less popular than Hasegawa's; consequently, few studies have been made of Ueda and her works. Ueda was nonetheless an influential shōjo manga artist of the 1950s and 1960s, with Fuichin-san enjoying a popularity similar to that of Princess Sapphire by Osamu Tezuka in the late 1950s. Owing to of her status as a pioneer and her influence on shōjo manga of the era, some commentators, such as the journalist Kanta Ishida, consider her to be the "mother of shōjo manga". Ueda influenced later manga artists such as Fumiko Takano and Motoka Murakami, the latter of whom created Fuichin Tsaichen!, a 10-volume biographical manga of Ueda's life, which was published in the manga magazine Big Comic Original from 2013 to 2017.

Ueda was awarded the 5th Shogakukan Manga Award in 1959 for Fuichin-san and Bonko-chan. She won the Japan Cartoonists Association Award twice, receiving the Excellence Award in 1989 for Ako-Bāchan, and the Minister of Education, Science and Technology Award in 2003 in recognition for her career as a manga artist. Ueda also served as a jurist for the Yomiuri Shimbun Daily Manga Award five times.
