= Fuichin Zàijiàn! =

Japanese manga series

- First volume cover

フイチン再見! (Fuichin Tsaichen!)
- Genre: Biographical
- Manga
- Written by: Motoka Murakami
- Published by: Shogakukan
- Magazine: Big Comic Original
- Original run: March 19, 2013 – March 20, 2017
- Volumes: 10
- icon

Fuichin Zàijiàn! (フイチン再見!, Fuichin Tsaichen!; "Goodbye Fuichin!") is a Japanese manga series written and illustrated by Motoka Murakami. It was serialized in Shogakukan's seinen manga magazine Big Comic Original from March 2013 to March 2017, with its chapters collected in ten tankōbon volumes.

== Story ==
Fuichin Zàijiàn! tells the story of real-life pioneer manga artist Toshiko Ueda, the author of Fuichin-san, who dedicated her life to create manga when it was not considered a popular career choice.

== Publication ==
Written and illustrated by Motoka Murakami, Fuichin Zàijiàn! was serialized in Shogakukan's seinen manga magazine Big Comic Original from March 19, 2013, to March 20, 2017. Shogakukan collected its chapters in ten tankōbon volumes, released from September 30, 2013, to June 30, 2017.

=== Volumes ===
No.	Japanese release date	Japanese ISBN
1	September 30, 2013	978-4-09-185429-2
2	February 28, 2014	978-4-09-185896-2
3	August 29, 2014	978-4-09-186380-5
4	January 30, 2015	978-4-09-186760-5
5	May 29, 2015	978-4-09-187054-4
6	November 30, 2015	978-4-09-187346-0
7	March 30, 2016	978-4-09-187524-2
8	August 30, 2016	978-4-09-187766-6
9	January 30, 2017	978-4-09-189345-1
10	June 30, 2017	978-4-09-189540-0

== Reception ==
The series ranked fourth on "The Best Manga 2014 Kono Manga wo Yome!" ranking by Freestyle magazine; it ranked 14th, alongside Here and Fruits Takuhaibin, on the 2018 edition. The series received the Excellence Award at the 43rd Japan Cartoonists Association Award in 2014. Fuichin Zàijiàn! was one of the Jury Recommended Works at the 21st Japan Media Arts Festival in 2018.
