= List of Princess Knight episodes =

The anime series Princess Knight is based on the manga series of the same name written by Osamu Tezuka. The series is co-directed by Tezuka, Chikao Katsui and Kanji Akabori, and produced by Mushi Production. The episodes follow Sapphire, a girl who pretend to be a male prince to prevent the criminal Duke Duralumon to inherit the throne of the reign. She experiences many adventures along with Choppy (Tink), the angel who gave her two hearts—a blue one of a boy and a pink of a girl.

Princess Knight was broadcast between April 2, 1967, and April 7, 1968, on Fuji Television. The 52 episodes were later released on LaserDisc by Pioneer on March 28, 1997. The episodes were also distributed in DVD format; Nippon Columbia released two box sets on December 21, 2001, and June 1, 2002. A single box set was released by Columbia on July 23, 2008, and another was released by Takarashijima on October 29, 2010.

After NBC Enterprises's decline Joe Oriolo purchased its distribution rights, and dubbed it to English in 1972; three episodes were made it into a film titled Choppy and the Princess that was syndicated in the United States in the 1970s and 1980s. The show also aired in Australia, and was released on home media in the United Kingdom. Nozomi Entertainment released two DVD box sets on August 20, 2013, and October 22, 2013, respectively.

The series use three pieces of theme music: two opening themes and a single ending theme. The first opening theme from episodes one to twenty-six is an instrumental version of "Ribon no Kishi" (リボンの騎士) and the second theme for the remaining episodes is the same music sung by Yōko Maekawa and Luna Arumonico. The ending theme is "Ribon no March" (リボンのマーチ, Ribon no Māchi) by Yōko Maekawa and Young Fresh.

The musics used in original Japanese films including opening themes and ending theme were composed by Isao Tomita.

== Episode list ==
No.	Episode title	Original release date
1	"Princess Knight" / "The Prince and the Angel"; Transliteration: "Ōji to Tenshi" (Japanese: 王子と天使)	April 2, 1967
In the kingdom of Silverland, the King and the Queen have a daughter who is raised as a boy and a prince (females are not eligible to reign) to prevent the evil Duke Duralumon from inheriting the throne. Duralumon plots to expose her true gender. Accompanied by the angel Choppy, Sapphire goes to the forest and defeats a man-eating wolf. As she does so, Sapphire thwarts Duralumon's plan to get the Queen to confess Sapphire's secret.
2	"The Daughter of Satan" / "The Arrival of Satan"; Transliteration: "Maō Tōjō" (Japanese: 魔王登場の巻)	April 9, 1967
Tired of Sapphire interfering with his new tax, Duke Duralumon helps Satan to capture Sapphire. Satan transfers Sapphire's power to his daughter Zenda to make her a powerful witch. Choppy helped by faithful peasants and by Zenda's assistance save Sapphire much to Satan's chagrin.
3	"The Contest of Strength" / "The Martial Arts Tournament"; Transliteration: "Bujutsu Taikai" (Japanese: 武術大会の巻)	April 16, 1967
Sapphire participates in the Military Arts Contest. Duke Duralumon sees this as an opportunity to crush Sapphire. After Sapphire succeeds in a number of events, Duralumon hires a Knight Baron to kill Sapphire. Baron chooses not to kill Sapphire and reveals the nature of her vanity.
4	"The Phantom Ship" / "Dance, Franz"; Transliteration: "Odore Furantsu" (Japanese: 踊れフランツ)	April 23, 1967
Prince Frank Charming visits Silverland on a galley ship with a grand dance onboard. Choppy meets several rowers unfairly enslaved by Duralumon and tries to help them by cutting their chains. Sapphire refuses Frank's invitation to dance and the two start dueling, eventually interrupted by the freed prisoners. Frank and Sapphire join forces to free the men and become friends.
5	"The Magic Herb" / "Valley of the Monsters"; Transliteration: "Kaibutsu no Tani" (Japanese: 怪物の谷)	April 30, 1967
Nylon places a poisoned rose where Sapphire is bound to touch it. When the queen picks the rose herself, she gets a dancing sickness. Sapphire is forced to defeat three monsters in order to get the antidote.
6	"The Three Wishes" / "The Children and the Giant"; Transliteration: "Kodomo to Kyojin" (Japanese: 小人と巨人)	May 7, 1967
Choppy finds a tiny sprite in a shell, and after an adventure with a giant whale, Choppy and Sapphire find themselves on an island fleeing from a ferocious giant. The sprite reveals himself to be the giant's son and helps send the pair back home.
7	"The Swan" / "The Cursed Swan"; Transliteration: "Noroi no Hakuchō" (Japanese: のろいの白鳥)	May 14, 1967
Satan has turned Gary's daughter Mary into a swan and uses her to lure Sapphire, so Zenda can rule Silverland. Sapphire with help from Choppy and Zenda get Satan's crystal ball to release Mary's soul in order to restore her.
8	"The Flying Horse" / "The Phantom Horse"; Transliteration: "Maboroshi no Uma" (Japanese: 幻の馬)	May 21, 1967
A Flying Horse is sent by Venus to change Sapphire to act like a girl. Nylon captures the flying horse and creates a decoy to trap Sapphire. After dodging Nylon's tricks, Sapphire rescues the flying horse from Nylon's clutches. Before the flying horse can change Sapphire, Choppy convinces the horse not to.
9	"The Broken Idols" / "The Broken Doll"; Transliteration: "Kowasareta Ningyō" (Japanese: こわされた人形)	May 28, 1967
During the Festival against Evil Spirits, Choppy accidentally breaks a sacred idol and is sentenced to death. Sapphire is also sentenced for deliberate vandalism in a fit of rage. They are both released by the executioner's son. Every lady of the castle destroys all the idols to express protest. An encounter with Satan reveals to everyone the idols are useless.
10	"The Silverland Carnival" / "The Carnival of Sapphire"; Transliteration: "Safaiya no Kānibaru" (Japanese: サファイヤのカーニバル)	June 4, 1967
Prince Frank and his father visit Silverland for a carnival. Frank gives Sapphire the gift of a hand mirror; the princess takes the gift as an insult and is offended. Choppy stumbles into a plot by Nylon and Duralumon to assassinate Sapphire using a massive steam-powered doll. Choppy is captured and tied up inside the doll. Meanwhile a crowd of revelers playfully dress Sapphire as a lady; She meets Frank in costume and the two share an enjoyable dance together. When the doll attacks, the arrow fired at Sapphire is deflected by the mirror. Frank and Sapphire defeat the doll and rescue Choppy.
11	"The Sandman" / "The Spirit of the Sleep"; Transliteration: "Nemuri no Sei" (Japanese: ねむりの精)	June 11, 1967
Duke Duralumon's slow-witted son Plastic is introduced. While the princess and Choppy enjoy a day of play, they meet and disturb the "Spirit of the Sleep", a mischievous sprite-like boy who uses his magic to put Plastic into a sleeping trance. Princess Knight begs the spirit to teach her how to cure the trance, impressing him by bowing before him. The spirit gives the princess a powder which restores Plastic to health.
12	"Princess and the Beggar" / "The Tattered Prince"; Transliteration: "Osorubeshi Saishūheiki" (Japanese: おんぼろ王子)	June 18, 1967
Sapphire switches place with a gypsy boy named John. Sapphire ends up under threat of death by the gypsies, while John is trailed by Nylon. Hired by Duke Duralumon the gypsies ambush John, but Sapphire thwarts them. John and Sapphire return to their lifestyles.
13	"The Rose Castle" / "The Mansion of the Roses"; Transliteration: "Bara no Kan" (Japanese: ばらの館)	June 25, 1967
Sapphire goes to the rose laden castle in Southern Valley. A presumed dream about the nymph Prince Brandt beckoning her to stop Duke Duralumon from destroying the castle, prompts Sapphire to terminate Duralumon's plans before he can start a war on a neighbouring country.
14	"The Love Letter" / "The Seven Goats"; Transliteration: "Nana Hiki no Koyagi" (Japanese: 七匹のこやぎ)	July 2, 1967
Gary takes Sapphire's picture with his new camera invention. While trying to retrieve the letter with the picture from Nylon's spy, Sapphire helps a wolf disguised as a goat save her seven kids from her wicked bobcat husband.
15	"The Tale of the Fox" / "Hunt Out the Golden Fox"; Transliteration: "Ōgon no Kitsune Kari" (Japanese: 黄金のキツネ狩り)	July 9, 1967
The cunning, talking fox Zool overhears Sapphire's secret. Zool is accidentally captured by Duralumon and his men, while her cubs are ambushed by a cave bear. Sapphire rescues the cubs and Zool keeps Sapphire's secret safe.
16	"The Puppet Show" / "Tink and Colette"; Transliteration: "Chinku to Koretto-chan" (Japanese: チンクとコレットちゃん)	July 16, 1967
A puppet show on a wagon comes to Silverland and Choppy is immediately smitten with a star puppet, Corette. The greedy puppet master uses Corette to commit home burglaries at night, while demanding money from children to see his daily shows. When the puppeteer attempts to rob the castle, Nylon catches him and employs him to frighten the queen. Choppy tricks everyone and teaches the puppeteer his puppets mean more to him than money.
17	"The Greedy Ghost" / "Goodbye, Ghost"; Transliteration: "Sayonara Yūrei-san" (Japanese: さよならユーレイさん)	July 23, 1967
Sapphire investigates the mansion of the miser Zenia. The ghost of Zenia is doomed, never to go to heaven until she is forgiven for her sins. Putting aside her desires and showing compassion for Sapphire grants Zenia her reward to heaven.
18	"The Magic Mirror" / The Mysterious Mirror""; Transliteration: "Fushigi na Kagami" (Japanese: ふしぎなカガミ)	July 30, 1967
Princess Bella, proud of her beauty is angered when mirror reveals that Sapphire is prettier. Knowing this, Sapphire tries to convince Bella that she's a boy. The mirror turns against Bella, convincing her to do the right thing by saving Sapphire from her collapsing mansion.
19	"The Magic Pen" / "The Magic Pen"; Transliteration: "Mahō no Pen" (Japanese: 魔法のペン)	August 6, 1967
Prince Frank gives Sapphire a special pen which can only write true statements. Using the pen reveals to Frank Sapphire's true gender, which Frank has long suspected. Duralumon has the pen stolen and the next day demands Sapphire sign an oath as prince, knowing the pen will reveal she is actually a princess. Frank and Choppy rescue Sapphire. Later Frank and Sapphire share an affectionate moment.
20	"The Dangerous Shadows" / "Kagera the Monster"; Transliteration: "Kaijū Kagera" (Japanese: 怪獣カゲラ)	August 13, 1967
Two shadow eating Kageras emerge from a lake. With the Kageras devastating the castle, Sapphire's only hope is to exchange her soul to Satan. Zenda helps destroy the Kageras and Choppy saves Sapphire from Satan.
21	"The Magic Cookies" / "The Best Snack in the World"; Transliteration: "Sekaiichi no o Yatsu" (Japanese: 世界一のおやつ)	August 20, 1967
Nylon's parrot mentions that Duralamon has mind controlling cookies. Dressed as a girl, Sapphire investigates a bakery. She finds the baker was tricked into doing Duralamon's work. She uses some of those cookies to make her way to Silverland castle and thwart the evil duke's plan.
22	"The Phantom Knight, Part 1" / "The Ceremony"; Transliteration: "Taikan Shiki" (Japanese: たいかん式の巻)	August 27, 1967
The king has disappeared without a trace. Convinced that he is dead, Sapphire is about to ascend to the throne, when the Queen suddenly reveals Sapphire's true gender, thanks to Duralamon's drugged wine. Sapphire is convicted of deceit and sentenced with her mother to Coffin Tower.
23	"The Phantom Knight, Part 2" / "The Ribbon Knight Appears"; Transliteration: "Ribon no Kishi Genwaru" (Japanese: リボンの騎士現わる)	September 3, 1967
Sapphire and her mother are put to work within the Coffin Tower. Inhabiting mice help stifle their hunger and misery, then help Sapphire to escape, providing her with new clothes to liberate Silverland under a new identity - The Phantom Knight.
24	"The Phantom Knight, Part 3" / "The Tower Buried in the Storm"; Transliteration: "Arashi no Kanoke Tō" (Japanese: 嵐のかんおけ塔)	September 10, 1967
Duralamon sends assassins to the Coffin Tower, but the Phantom Knight defeats them. With the Phantom Knight disrupting the evil duke's reign, Nylon sets a trap, only for it to fail. The Phantom Knight infiltrates the castle to steal the crown.
25	"The Phantom Knight, Part 4" / "Long Live to the King"; Transliteration: "Ōsama Banzai" (Japanese: 王様バンザイ)	September 17, 1967
The Coffin Tower master Gamar has been ordered by Duralamon to kill Sapphire and her mother, but he defects and tells a rumor of a ghost in Silverland Castle. The Phantom Knight liberates her enslaved people and finds her father very much alive in the castle dungeons. After securing the king's new law, the royal family triumphantly returns to take their rightful place in the castle.
26	"Queen Icicle Part 1" / "The Snow Queen"; Transliteration: "Yuki no Joō" (Japanese: 雪の女王)	September 24, 1967
Queen Icicle invites Sapphire to Coolland and reveals her evil intent to conquer Silverland with advanced technology. Satan turns Sapphire's parents into stone. Icicle gets Choppy out of the way and plants Tsurara to impersonatr Sapphire to take over Silverland. Sapphire is blinded, but manages to get to her castle, only to be thrown out.
27	"Queen Icicle Part 2" / "Hurry Up! The Black Cloud Island"; Transliteration: "soge! Kuro Kumo Shima" (Japanese: 急げ!黒雲島)	October 1, 1967
Satan takes Sapphire to his lair. Zenda releases Sapphire and leads her to Snake Island. Zenda refuses to let Sapphire sacrifice her magic sword for her parents and Sapphire is swept into the sea. Sapphire's old acquaintance Captain Blood, now a pirate rescues Sapphire. They travel past the dangerous Wild Rock and Harpy to Cleansing Waterfall which helps Sapphire recover her sight.
28	"Queen Icicle Part 3" / "The Iron Lion"; Transliteration: "Tetsu Shishi" (Japanese: 鉄獅子)	October 8, 1967
Sapphire returns to Silverland as the Phantom Knight to liberate her kingdom from Queen Icicle. Sapphire enters Queen Icicle's slave quarries and rescues Choppy. A well aimed arrow shot by Sapphire prevents Queen Icicle's Iron Lion weapon from invading Silverland. Zenda takes Sapphire back to Snake Island to rescue her parents from Satan.
29	"Queen Icicle Part 4" / "The End of the Snow Queen"; Transliteration: "Yuki no Joō no Saigo" (Japanese: 雪の女王の最後)	October 15, 1967
Satan restores Sapphire's parents only for them to be recaptured by Queen Icicle. Satan holds Sapphire prisoner, but she is rescued by Choppy and together they remove Tsurara from Silverland. Sapphire penetrates Queen Icicle's castle, while Choppy gathers supporters to lay siege to Coolland. With the evil queen overthrown, Sapphire returns with her parents to Silverland.
30	"The Phantom Kite" / "The Flying Phantom Thief"; Transliteration: "Sora Tobu Kaitō" (Japanese: 空とぶ怪盗)	October 22, 1967
A skilled thief is stealing crown from the heads of kings and queens. When he steals the crown of Silverland, Sapphire investigates a circus performer with the athletic skills to ride kites. Sapphire discovers the thief is a pair of identical twins. With the doctor's help, the twins are captured. Sapphire finds she admires the two, and helps them escape.
31	"The Sea Kingdom" / "Tink and the Princess of the Sea"; Transliteration: "Chinku to Umi no Ojō-sama" (Japanese: チンクと海のお嬢さま)	October 29, 1967
Choppy is taken to Neptune's sea kingdom, where he is tasked with aiding the sea princess. However the Sharkman means to marry the princess and captures Choppy and Sapphire, but they both escape and turn the tables on the Sharkman.
32	"The Silver Ship" / "The Treasure of Sapphire"; Transliteration: "Safaiya no Takara" (Japanese: サファイヤの宝)	November 5, 1967
Gary stumbles onto a book which shows the location of a legendary ship made entirely of silver. While Nylon plans to dig up the ship, Sapphire runs into the Silver Knight, a ghostly protector. Sapphire convinces the knight she doesn't want the silver for herself, and together they defeat Nylon's and Duralumon's greedy plans. The knight predicts Sapphire will be a wise ruler and protect the ship until her reign.
33	"The Egyptian Adventure" / "The Phantom of the Pyramid"; Transliteration: "Piramiddo no Kaijin" (Japanese: ピラミッドの怪人)	November 12, 1967
While trying to save an Egyptian Maiden from becoming the sacrifice of Malpho the Mighty, Sapphire unwittingly takes her place. Despite Prince Ahmed's hand in marriage as a chance to be saved, she turns it down. Malpho's true intentions are to sell sacrificial girls as slaves. Prince Ahmed finds the courage to defeat Malpho and gives Sapphire safe passage back to Silverland.
34	"The Poison Dart" / "The Giant Moose"; Transliteration: "Kyo Shika Mūsu" (Japanese: 巨鹿ムース)	November 19, 1967
To prove to Nylon she is no coward, Sapphire goes to hunt the legendary Giant Moose. To ensure that she fails, Nylon drives the Giant Moose mad with a poison dart. Sapphire removes the dart and befriends him, thus gaining her place in the hall of kings.
35	"The Airship" / "Chasing the Airship!"; Transliteration: "Hikōsen o Oe!" (Japanese: 飛行船を追え!)	November 26, 1967
A black speeding coach has been causing damage and harm in its regular passes. Sapphire finds out that Duke Duralumon has been trading with an arms dealer to build an airship to invade neighbouring lands. Sapphire raids the secret arms factory and prevents her father from buying the airship.
36	"The Magic Spell Part 1" / "The Great Witch Comes Back"; Transliteration: "Kaette Kita Dai Majo" (Japanese: 帰ってきた大魔女)	December 3, 1967
Satan's wife Hellion arrives and takes charge to train Zenda and capture Sapphire. Zenda changes herself into a cat to help a hypnotised Sapphire get to Goldland. Hellion enters Goldland in the guise of a princess. With her plan thwarted by Prince Frank, Hellion curses the river to turn drinkers into stone. Prince Frank tries to protect Sapphire, but Hellion takes her away.
37	"The Magic Spell Part 2" / "Rescue Sapphire!"; Transliteration: "Safaia o Sukue!" (Japanese: サファイヤを救え!)	December 10, 1967
Zenda does what she can to prevent Prince Frank from going to Satan's lair. However they both work together to spike some soup with cursed tree sap to make Satan and Helliot go blind. They succeed and escape, but Zenda is tainted from her encounter with the cursed tree. Back at Goldland, Almighty God restores Zenda and she returns to her parents.
38	"The Black Knight" / "Commandments of the Knight"; Transliteration: "Kishi no Okite" (Japanese: 騎士の掟)	December 17, 1967
Sapphire is horrified about the cruel treatment Duke Duralumon is giving to captured wild dogs. Geenar, a deserted knight of Bolard, persists to challenge Sapphire to a duel, but the Black Knight who has been trailing Geenar revealed to be his mother, convinces him to stop his fights and Geenar befriends Sapphire.
39	"The Stolen Beauty" / "The Envy of Venus"; Transliteration: "Bīnasu no Netami" (Japanese: ビーナスのねたみ)	December 24, 1967
The queen is gravely ill. Sapphire visits the Eternal Venus, but has to sacrifice her beauty to Venus in exchange for the flower that cures the queen. Sapphire covers her face with a mask and is mistaken for an invader even in the kingdom of Troubleland. Venus worsens Sapphire's predicament, but the Almighty God punishes Venus, allowing Sapphire to return to her kingdom.
40	"The Hunt" / "The Fearful Emperor X"; Transliteration: "Kyōfu no X Teikoku" (Japanese: 恐怖のX帝国)	January 7, 1968
During a Royal Hunting Contest, Sapphire's beloved Prince Frank is misled right into the hands of the X-Union witch. Sapphire as the Phantom Knight, sneaks into the lair, releases Prince Franks and turns the witch's slaves against her, before they all make their escape from the collapsing lair and make a triumphant return to Silverland.
41	"Princess Peppi" / "The Mischievous Teppy"; Transliteration: "Ochamena Teppi" (Japanese: おちゃめなテッピー)	January 14, 1968
Sapphire and Prince Frank have been exchanging love letters by the messenger dog Gold. Princess Peppi wants Prince Frank for herself, but Frank's refusal to propose gives her father King Charcoal an excuse to start war on Goldland, which serves as a plot for the X-Union to take over the surrounding lands. Princess Peppi and the Phantom Knight rescue Prince Frank, defeat the Vampires and end the war between King Charcoal and Goldland.
42	"Famine in Silverland" / "The Big Plan to Capture Nezumi"; Transliteration: "Nezumi Tori Dai Sakusen" (Japanese: ねずみ取り大作戦)	January 21, 1968
A plague or rats is sent the X-Union lieutenant Rat-Man after a success harvest to devastate Silverland's food supply. Choppy overhears the Rat-Man planning to have his rat swarm devour Goldland's relief convoy at the river. Informed of this, Prince Frank kills much of the rat swarm, while the Phantom Knight thwarts Duke Duralumon's ambush. The convoy's arrival is successful and after a final confrontation with Prince Frank, the Rat-Man leaves in disgrace.
43	"Spider Island" / "Sapphire Falls into the Trap"; Transliteration: "Wana ni Kakatta Safaiya" (Japanese: ワナにかかったサファイヤ)	January 28, 1968
Sapphire and Choppy walk right into a trap set by Duke Duralumon in the form of a beautiful swan ship heading to Spider Island. Prince Frank is able to come aboard before they reach the island. The hostile Spider-Man captures Prince Frank. Following a rescue by the Phantom Knight, Frank is struck by a poisoned knife. Frank is cured and is able to kill Spider-Man in an ambush.
44	"The Snow Eagle" / "The Yell of the White Eagle"; Transliteration: "Sakebu Shiro Washi" (Japanese: さけぶ白ワシ)	February 4, 1968
After a severe snowstorm, the X-Union attacks Silverland with a giant cannon. Sapphire, Prince Frank and Choppy's attempt to blow up the Silverland bridge fails. Using reflective pieces of ice, they detonate some gunpowder while the giant cannon is in a ravine, causing an avalanche to bury it.
45	"The Ghost Ship" / "Tink and the Ghost Ship"; Transliteration: "Chinku to Yūrei Sen" (Japanese: チンクとゆうれい船)	February 11, 1968
Sapphire investigates a hostile ghost ship which is said to be commanded by Captain Blood, but is actually commanded by Duke Duralumon's lackeys. One lackey impersonates Blood's first mate. Choppy is captured by the ghost ship crew. Captain Blood and Sapphire battle the ghost pirates on Skull Island and Blood's name is cleared.
46	"The Butterfly Witch" / "Sapphire in the Mysterious Forest " Transliteration: "Fushigi no Mori no Safaiya" (Japanese: ふしぎの森のサファイヤ)	February 18, 1968
An evil witch secretly in league with the X-Union uses a swarm of moths she calls her "children" and two stooges disguised as the Phantom Knight to disrupt and weaken Goldland. Prince Frank is misled into believing the Phantom Knight is responsible. When Frank and Sapphire are trapped in the witch's burning forest cabin, they turn the tables and destroy the witch and her children.
47	"The Battle of Vengeance" / "The Wanderer Frank"; Transliteration: "Samayō Furantsu" (Japanese: さまようフランツ)	February 25, 1968
War breaks out between the X-Union and Goldland. Goldland is stabbed in the back by Charcoal Land and overrun. Prince Frank is saved by his man in waiting who dies delivering a message to Sapphire. The Phantom Knight regroups the Goldland soldiers to rescue Prince Frank and their hopes to save Goldland are renewed.
48	"The Invasion of Silverland Part 1" / "Sapphire Disappears in the Sea"; Transliteration: "Umi ni Kieta Safaiya" (Japanese: 海に消えたサファイヤ)	March 3, 1968
Captain Blood hands Sapphire over to X-Union to track them to their underwater lair. Duke Duralumon demolishes the Silverland village to defame Sapphire. Captain Blood rescues Sapphire and leads the Silverland villagers to drive out the X-Union demolition team. A runaway cart of explosives destroys all of the X-Union's underwater lair.
49	"The Invasion of Silverland Part 2" / "The Smile of the Hekate"; Transliteration: "Hekēto no Hohoemi" (Japanese: ヘケートのほほえみ)	March 10, 1968
The X-Union destroy the Devil Mountain on their way to Silverland. Zenda is captured by X-Union Lieutenant Garna and the General Mr. X requests Satan and Hellion to capture Sapphire. Zenda helped by the defecting Garna, releases Sapphire. Satan and Hellion are betrayed by Mr. X, so they sacrifice themselves to save their daughter, which earns the devil family punishment from The Spirit of Evil.
50	"The Fortune Teller" / "The Black Knight of the Wawel Castle"; Transliteration: "Baberu Shiro no Kuro Kishi" (Japanese: バベル城の黒騎士)	March 24, 1968
Using a black fog, the X-Union guided by a Fortune Teller witch and a Phantom Giant, kidnap many of Silverland's people to speed up the construction their fortifications. The Queen takes Sapphire's place in an orchestrated kidnapping. The Phantom Knight slays the Fortune Teller. Having failed to gain a foothold, Mr. X destroys the castle, the captured hostages managing to escape.
51	"The Princess Knight & Phantom Knight Part 1" / "Burn, Silverland"; Transliteration: "Moeru Shirubārando" (Japanese: 燃えるシルバーランド)	March 31, 1968
After Sapphire's order to send Silverland's army to protect the borders is failed to be delivered, it is revealed that her advisors have been replaced by agents of the X-Union. Duralamon is about to declare his son as king of Silverland however before he can Nylon betrays him and declares himself king.
52	"The Princess Knight & Phantom Knight Part 2" / "The Happiness in Silverland"; Transliteration: "Shirubārando Shiawase ni" (Japanese: シルバーランド幸せに)	April 7, 1968
