= Phoenix (Japanese TV series) =

Japanese anime television series

火の鳥 (Hi no Tori)
- Anime television series
- Directed by: Ryōsuke Takahashi
- Written by: Fuyunori Gobu (eps 1-4); Keiichi Hasegawa (eps 5-6); Gisaburō Sugii (ep 7); Toru Nozaki (eps 8-11); Hirotoshi Kobayashi (eps 12-13)
- Music by: Yuji Nomi; Hidekazu Naichi
- Studio: Tezuka Productions
- Licensed by: US: Media Blasters
- Original network: NHK BShi
- English network: ZA: Animax
- Original run: April 4, 2004 – June 27, 2004
- Episodes: 13
- Anime film

Phoenix: Robe of Feathers
- Directed by: Masayoshi Nishida
- Studio: Tezuka Productions
- Released: July 17, 2004
- Runtime: 21 minutes

Phoenix (Note: Japanese: 火の鳥, Hepburn: Hi no Tori) is a 13-episode 2004 anime series based on the manga of the same name by Osamu Tezuka. It was developed by Tezuka Productions and directed by Ryōsuke Takahashi, and originally broadcast in Japan on NHK BShi. A short film by the same staff as the TV series based on the 1971 short Phoenix: Robe of Feathers, was released on July 17, 2004.

The series was first distributed in the United States in 2007 by AnimeWorks, and a Blu-ray release by Media Blasters was announced in 2019. As of 2023, the series is also available on Crunchyroll. In a 2019 social media post, the Embassy of Japan in Jamaica announced that Phoenix was among the anime series broadcast by CVM Television.

== Episodes ==
No.	Title	Original release date
1	"Dawn arc" Transliteration: "Reimeihen" (Japanese: 黎明編)	April 4, 2004
2	"Dawn arc" Transliteration: "Reimeihen" (Japanese: 黎明編)	April 11, 2004
3	"Dawn arc" Transliteration: "Reimeihen" (Japanese: 黎明編)	April 18, 2004
4	"Dawn arc" Transliteration: "Reimeihen" (Japanese: 黎明編)	April 25, 2004
5	"Resurrection arc" Transliteration: "Fukkatsuhen" (Japanese: 復活編)	May 2, 2004
6	"Resurrection arc" Transliteration: "Fukkatsuhen" (Japanese: 復活編)	May 9, 2004
7	"Strange Beings arc" Transliteration: "Igyouhen" (Japanese: 異形編)	May 16, 2004
8	"Sun arc" Transliteration: "Taiyouhen" (Japanese: 太陽編)	May 23, 2004
9	"Sun arc" Transliteration: "Taiyouhen" (Japanese: 太陽編)	May 30, 2004
10	"Sun arc" Transliteration: "Taiyouhen" (Japanese: 太陽編)	June 6, 2004
11	"Sun arc" Transliteration: "Taiyouhen" (Japanese: 太陽編)	June 13, 2004
12	"Future arc" Transliteration: "Miraihen" (Japanese: 未来編)	June 20, 2004
13	"Future arc" Transliteration: "Miraihen" (Japanese: 未来編)	June 27, 2004

== See also ==
- List of Osamu Tezuka anime
