= Phoenix (1978 film) =

- Theatrical poster
- Directed by: Kon Ichikawa
- Screenplay by: Shuntarō Tanikawa
- Based on: Phoenix by Osamu Tezuka
- Produced by: Kiichi Ichikawa; Kunihiko Murai
- Starring: Tomisaburo Wakayama; Toshinori Omi; Masao Kusakari; Mieko Takamine; Ken Tanaka; Mitsuko Kusabue; Masaya Oki; Tatsuya Nakadai
- Cinematography: Kiyoshi Hasegawa
- Edited by: Michiko Ikeda; Chizuko Osada
- Music by: Jun Fukamachi; Michel Legrand
- Production companies: Hi no Tori Productions; Tezuka Productions
- Distributed by: Toho
- Release date: August 19, 1978 (Japan)
- Running time: 137 minutes
- Country: Japan
- Language: Japanese

Phoenix (Japanese: 火の鳥, Hepburn: Hi no Tori) (Note: Also known as The Phoenix) is a 1978 Japanese jidaigeki film written and directed by Kon Ichikawa. It is based on the "Dawn" storyline from Osamu Tezuka's manga of the same title.

Himiko, the queen of Yamatai, orders her subordinates to search for the Phoenix, which is said to have eternal life for those who drinks its blood.

== Cast ==
- Tomisaburo Wakayama as Sarutahiko, General of the Yamatai
- Toshinori Omi as Nagi
- Masao Kusakari as Yumihiko of Matsuro
- Mieko Takamine as Queen Himiko of Yamatai
- Ken Tanaka as Takeru
- Mitsuko Kusabue as Iyo
- Masaya Oki as Uraji
- Akiji Kobayashi as Yamatai Imperial Guard
- Reiko Ohara as Hinaku
- Tōru Emori as Susanoo
- Takeshi Kato as Kamamushi
- Hideji Ōtaki as Sukune
- Jun Fubuki as Oro
- Kaoru Yumi as Uzume
- Junzaburo Ban as Witch Doctor
- Tatsuya Nakadai as Jingi the Conqueror, leader of the Takamagahara Ninigi
- Masako Oka as The Phoenix
