= Beat the House =

American reality television series

- Genre: Real estate
- Created by: Cleve Keller; Dave Noll
- Country of origin: United States
- No. of seasons: 1
- No. of episodes: 8

Production
- Running time: 22 minutes

Original release
- Network: HGTV
- Release: January 7 – February 21, 2014

Beat the House is an American reality series that aired on HGTV. It is hosted by real estate agents JoJo Jones and Christopher Kromer, and centers upon both realtors competing for the same customers. The show began airing on January 7, 2014.

== Premise ==
The show's premise centers upon the show's two hosts, JoJo Jones and Christopher Kromer, approaching a prospective customer that is ready to purchase a house from a third real estate agent. The hosts then show the customer two additional homes, giving them the option to remain with their previous choice or to choose between the houses that the two hosts have presented.

== Episodes ==
No.	Title	Original release date
1	"Moving Out of Mom and Dad's Into Their Forever Home"	January 7, 2014
A Hillsborough, New Jersey couple planning to purchase a house is approached by two realtors that offer them two more houses to consider before purchasing the one they had initially planned upon.
2	"First Time Home Buyers Escape to the Suburbs"	January 7, 2014
Ready to move out of their cramped apartment, a couple must decide between two dream houses.
3	"Pregnant and Pressured First-Time Homeowners Search for a Home"	January 14, 2014
Expectant parents must search for a new house to fit their growing family.
4	"A Family of Five Searches for More Space"	January 14, 2014
5	"A Couple Struggles to Sacrifice Style for Space in New Home"	January 21, 2014
6	"Big Family Shops for More Space"	January 21, 2014
7	"The Eastmans"	February 14, 2014
8	"Escape to the Suburbs"	February 21, 2014

== Reception ==
Bloomberg Businessweek wrote a mixed review for the show, criticizing it for being overly familiar to similarly themed real estate reality shows while stating that it does introduce some new elements in that the show "capitalizes on a specifically modern fear—the recently coined "fear of missing out".
