= Fuichin-san =

Manga series by Toshiko Ueda

- Collected edition cover, featuring Li Chu (left) and Fuichin (right)

フイチンさん
- Genre: Comedy
- Created by: Toshiko Ueda
- Manga
- Written by: Toshiko Ueda
- Published by: Kodansha
- Magazine: Shōjo Club
- Original run: January 1957 – March 1962
- Anime film
- Directed by: Yoshitaka Koyama
- Studio: Animaruya
- Released: March 20, 2004
- Runtime: 61 minutes

Fuichin-san (Japanese: フイチンさん; "Miss Fuichin") is a Japanese manga series written and illustrated by Toshiko Ueda. It was originally serialized in the shōjo (girls) magazine Shōjo Club from 1957 to 1962. Set in early 20th century Manchuria, the series depicts the adventures of Fuichin, the daughter of a servant of a wealthy family, and Li Chu, the son of this family. The series won the 5th Shogakukan Manga Award in 1959, and was adapted into an anime film in 2004.

== Synopsis ==
The series is set in Harbin, Manchuria (located in modern China) at an unspecified date during the occupation of Manchuria by the Empire of Japan in the early 20th century. The primary character is Fuichin (フイチン), a Chinese teenager and daughter of the doorman of the residence of Liu Tai (リュウタイ), the patriarch of the wealthiest family in the city. Fuichin is an independently minded tomboy, but is also kind and good-natured, and is distinguished by her two characteristic long braids of hair.

Despite Fuichin's low status, her sunny disposition wins her the admiration of most people she encounters, including Liu Tai. He asks Fuichin to become the playmate to his youngest son Li Chu (リイチュウ), who is ten years Fuichin's junior. The series comedically illustrates the various adventures and misadventures of Fuichin and Li Chu, including the jealousy of Li Chu's mother, an attempted arranged marriage between Fuichin and Li Chu, and the kidnapping of Li Chu.

== Production ==
Fuichin-san author Toshiko Ueda was born in Japan, but lived in Harbin as a child from 1917 to 1929, and again as an adult from 1943 to 1946. She made her debut as a manga artist in 1937, and between 1937 and 1938 published the series Buta to Kūnyan (ブタとクーニャン; "Buta and Kūnyan") in the daily newspaper Tokyo Nichi Nichi Shimbun. The series was a humorous yonkoma (four-panel comic strip) featuring a Chinese girl, which Ueda has described as a prototype version of Fuichin-san.

After repatriating to Japan, Ueda contributed manga to various shōjo (girls) manga magazines in the 1950s. She decided to create a manga series based on her life in Harbin, rendering an idyllic version of history in which the city's Chinese, Japanese and Russian populations live in harmony. China was an atypical setting for shōjo manga of the era, which were typically set in Japan or western settings; Ueda sought to appeal to girl readers with a setting that was exotic, but still recognizably Asian. While Ueda drew from her own experience living in Harbin, she elected to make the protagonist of the series Chinese, with the name "Fuichin" drawn from the name of the daughter of the Ueda family's cook in Harbin.

Fuichin-san was published in the magazine Shōjo Club on a monthly basis from the January 1957 issue to the March 1962 issue.

== Reception ==
Fuichin-san is Ueda's most well-known series, and enjoyed a comparable level of popularity to Osamu Tezuka's influential shōjo series Princess Knight, which was published in Shōjo Club from 1953 to 1956. The titular character of Fuichin-san became the mascot of the magazine for the duration of its publication run. In 1959, both Fuichin-san and Ueda's manga series Bonko-chan won the 5th Shogakukan Manga Award.

== Adaptation ==
An anime film adaptation of Fuichin-san produced by Animaruya was released on March 20, 2004. The film was directed by Yoshitaka Koyama, and features Michiyo Yanagisawa as the voice of Fuichin and Yuko Sasamoto as the voice of Li Chu.
