= The Ribbon Hero =

2026 film by Yuuki Igarashi

- English release poster
- Kanji: リボンヒーロー
- Revised Hepburn: Ribon Hīrō
- Directed by: Yuuki Igarashi
- Screenplay by: Yuuki Igarashi
- Based on: Princess Knight by Osamu Tezuka
- Produced by: Shunya Hasabe
- Starring: Saya; Seiran Kobayashi; Koki Uchiyama; Mayumi Shintani
- Cinematography: Hikaru Fukuda
- Edited by: Junichi Uematsu
- Music by: Satoru Kosaki; Ryuichi Takada
- Production companies: Outline; Twin Engine
- Distributed by: Netflix
- Release date: August 8, 2026
- Running time: 111 minutes
- Country: Japan
- Language: Japanese

The Ribbon Hero (Japanese: リボンヒーロー, Hepburn: Ribon Hīrō) is a 2026 Japanese animated fantasy action-adventure film directed by Yuuki Igarashi, in his feature directorial debut. An adaptation of Osamu Tezuka's manga series Princess Knight, it is produced by Netflix and Twin Engine and animated by Outline. It features character designs by Kei Mochizuki, with Mai Yoneyama and Issei Arakaki contributing to the designs, and Satoru Kosaki and Ryuichi Takada composing the music. The film was released on Netflix on August 8, 2026. The film's theme song is "Reborn", performed by Girls Archives.

== Plot ==
Long ago, a monster named Nergal from the Sea of Ash appeared, destroying everything in its path. Humanity tried to stop it, but every attempt failed. Eventually, humanity awakened a warrior known as the Ribbon Hero.

The story then shifts to the present day, where the powerless Princess Sapphire finds herself amid the ruins of a castle destroyed by the monster Nergal. After being awakened by Zirco, they make their way through the palace corridors, only to discover that her father and mother have already been contaminated by Nergal’s spores. Before the palace collapses, Sapphire refuses to leave, but Zirco forces her to escape. Everyone flees using the available ships, only to watch their homeland being destroyed by Nergal’s attack.

After reaching the coast and taking shelter in an abandoned mine, Zirco creates an iron arm brace for Sapphire to treat her broken arm. The following morning, they wander across the vast plains in search of a new place to live.

In Goldland, Pine, who is delivering bread, is suddenly approached by two strangers asking for some of her bread. She then invites them to her home. It is revealed that the strangers are Sapphire and Zirco, who have been starving after wandering for seven years and are looking for work to survive. Pine’s father reveals that the quickest way to make money is by mining crystals.

On mining day, they meet Rock, Chorogy, Hecate, Chick, and Jack, who become their teammates. While mining, the monster Ash King emerges from the surface and attacks them. Sapphire falls into a crystal cavern and awakens the power of her ribbon, transforming her into the Ribbon Hero she christened as the "Princess Knight". After driving the monster back, the group is summoned by Velvet, who warns them that if the monster is fought without proper precautions, it will destroy the entire area.

The following day, Sapphire is escorted by guards to meet Velvet. Sapphire makes a pact with Velvet to help defeat the Ash King. Velvet reveals that Nergal is not actually a creature native to their world and will only consume human souls once their crystals have been depleted.

Sapphire battles the Nergal inside the Pillar of Creation and unknowingly awakens a power that allows her to transform into a white swan.

Three months later, the Partners inform the Pope that Nergal’s spores have appeared in the capital, prompting the immediate evacuation of its citizens. Shortly after Sapphire destroys one of the Pillars of Creation, the true Nergal appears and begins destroying Goldland, killing Chorogy in the process. Despite Sapphire and Velvet’s efforts to prevent Nergal from destroying the city, they fail, and they, along with the children from the orphanage, are sacrificed as offerings to the Ash King.

After Pine and the others free Sapphire and Velvet from the guards and saved the orphans, Sapphire uses her power and enters the Ash King, which has transformed into its true form. She awakens in a dreamlike realm alongside the heroes of the past and the people who had perished in Nergal’s attacks.

Sapphire eventually defeats the Ash King by piercing its heart core and returns to her friends. Sapphire and Zirco then return to Silverland to pay their final respects to everyone in the kingdom who perished during the attack seven years earlier.

== Voice cast ==
| Character | Voice actor | |
| Character | Japanese | English |
|---|---|---|
| Sapphire (サファイア, Safaia) | Saya | Courtney Lin |
| Pine (パイン, Pain) | Seiran Kobayashi | Jenny Yokobori |
| Velvet (ベルベット, Berubetto) | Koki Uchiyama | Alan Lee |
| Zirco (ジルコ, Jiruko) | Mayumi Shintani | Anne Yatco |
| Rock (ロック, Rokku) | Yoshimasa Hosoya | Stephen Fu |
| Hecate (ヘケート, Hekēto) | Mito Tsukino | Miya Kodama |
| Chorogy (チョロギ, Chorogi) | Yūsuke Tezuka | Caleb Yen |
| Chick (ジルコ, Chikku) | Lunlun | Dawn Anderson |
| Jack (タック, Takku) | Debidebi Debiru | Brittany Lauda |
| Pope (教皇, Kyōkō) | Haruhiko Jō | Keone Young |

== Release ==
The Ribbon Hero was released on Netflix on August 8, 2026. The film was previewed at the 2026 Annecy International Animation Film Festival on June 24.

A limited theatrical release in Japan was announced for September 4 to September 17, 2026.

== Reception ==
=== Critical response ===
Clint Worthington of RogerEbert.com rated the film 2 stars out of 4, writing that what it achieves through "remarkable," fluid action animation and "crisply captured" kineticism, it ultimately undermines with a "misguided" omission of the source material's queer themes, "disorienting" shifts in visual styles, and a "whirling-dervish" narrative pace that leaves its characters with "nary enough information to make sense of it." Kennedy from Anime News Network gave it an unfavorable review, characterizing it as a "textbook example of form over function," commending its "simply unmatched" production value, "lusciously-colored" 2D visuals, and "excellent" soundtrack, while noting that its "rushed" pacing and incoherent themes cause the story to "absolutely faceplants into the gorgeously animated dirt."

Phil Hoad of The Guardian awarded the film 2 stars out of 5, describing it as an "anticlimax" that boasts an "impressive array" of animation styles but ultimately registers as "run-of-the-mill girl-power puff" due to its "vanilla characterisation" and a failure to capitalise on the source material's pioneering gender-bending themes. Sam Nelson of Polygon gave it a highly negative review, describing it as "pretentious and uninspired" and a work that "fails on almost every level," criticizing its "trite dialogue," "dull action sequences," and "incoherent" narrative structure, despite noting the animation studio's visual "ambitions" in playing with distinct artistic mediums.

Writing for Gizmodo, Isaiah Colbert called it a "rejuvenating reminder" of female-led anime, describing the film as a "delightfully whimsical" and emotionally resonant "magical girl epic" that succeeds through an "unabashedly warm and hopeful tone," even if its final act gets "a bit off the rails" with clashing CGI and fast-paced narrative choices.
