= Christopher Kromer =

American actor

- Born: Christopher Edward Kromer; August 1, 1973 (age 52); Queens, New York City, New York, United States
- Occupations: Actor; television host
- Years active: 1997–present
- Website: https://www.bhsusa.com/agents/christopher-kromer

Christopher Edward "Chris" Kromer (born August 1, 1973) is an American actor and television host. He is co-host of the reality series Beat the House on HGTV.

== Early life ==
Kromer was born in Queens, New York and was raised in New Jersey. Kromer's mother was a successful real estate agent, and he grew up in the real estate business.

== Career ==
As an actor, Kromer has starred in short films and played roles in national commercials for Sprint, Chrysler, and Clearisil as well as guest roles in the television series Thumb Wrestling Federation (TWF), Law & Order, Guiding Light, Gossip Girl, and Royal Pains. He has been a host of the television show Cool In Your Code. In 2014, he became co-host of the new HGTV series Beat the House. As a voice actor he has done English anime voiceovers for Yûsha ô Gaogaigar, Berserk, Samurai Deeper Kyo, Hi no tori, Kurokami: The Animation, Queen's Blade Rebellion, and Yu-Gi-Oh! Zexal along with the anime film series Berserk: The Golden Age Arc and the animated film The Painting. He also provided the voice for Kirby Olsen one of the jocks in the 2006 video game Bully, from Rockstar Games. As a business man Kromer worked as a financial consultant at Ernst & Young LLP for three years. Now he works as a real estate agent at Halstead Property. He has brokered the 4th most expensive sale of 2013 in New York City, he is in the top 5% of the company in the producers council, he was voted broker of the year in the village office, and he won the 2013 top diamond award company wide. He also was voted by Trulia and real trends the top real estate agent in New York, and he is a board certified New York residential specialist and a certified negotiation expert. Kromer is also a former pianist and he has played at Carnegie Hall, in his spare time he still devotes himself in the arts of piano.

== Filmography ==
=== Film ===
Year	Film	Role	Notes
2006	Walls	Guy	Short Film
2010	David	Charlie	Short Film
2008	The Machine Girl	Sho Kimura (voice)	English version
2011	The Painting	Gray Morgan (voice)	English version
2012-2014	Berserk: The Golden Age Arc	Judeau (voice)	English version

=== Television ===
Year	Film	Role	Notes
1997	Yûsha ô Gaogaigar	HyoRyu (voice)	21 episodes
1997-1998	Berserk	Judeau (voice)	22 episodes
2002	Samurai Deeper Kyo	Yukimura Sanada (voice)	26 episodes
2004	Hi no tori	Leona (voice)	5 episodes
2006-2011	Thumb Wrestling Federation	Hometown Huck (voice)	Unknown episodes
2006	Law & Order	Uniform Cop	Episode: "Home Sweet"
2006	Guiding Light	Husband	Episode #1.15073
2006-2008	Cool In Your Code	Himself-Host	14 episodes
2008	25 Biggest Real Estate Mistakes	Himself-Real Estate Expert	TV movie
2009	Kurokami: The Animation	Daichi Kuraki (voice)	23 episodes
2011	Gossip Girl	Post Journalist	Episode: "The Kids Are Not All Right"
2011	Royal Pains	EMT	Episode: "The Shaw/Hank Redemption"
2012	Huntik: Secrets & Seekers	Mr. Wilder (voice)	10 episodes
2012-2015	Yu-Gi-Oh! Zexal	Kite Tenjo (voice)	73 episodes
2014	Beat the House	Himself/co-host	Unknown episodes
2017-2018	Yu-Gi-Oh! Arc-V	Kite Tenjo (voice)	6 episodes

=== Video games ===
Year	Game	Role
2006	Bully	Kirby Olsen
2017	Yu-Gi-Oh! Duel Links	Kite Tenjo

== Personal life ==
Kromer is a graduate of Rutgers University. Since then, he has lived mostly in the Upper East and Upper West Side of New York with his wife and children.
