= Hi no Tori Hououhen (MSX) =

1987 video game

- Developer: Konami
- Publisher: Konami
- Composers: Motoaki Furukawa; Yoshinori Sasaki
- Platform: MSX2
- Release: 1987
- Genre: Action
- Mode: Single-player

Hi no Tori Hououhen (火の鳥 鳳(ほう)凰(おう)編(へん), Bird of Fire: Karma) is a 1987 video game for the MSX2 developed by Konami, produced alongside a similarly named game for the Famicom. Both games are based on the series and story arc with the same names.

It is in essence a Knightmare-like vertical scrolling shooter with the player viewing his character on the back and enemies and obstacles entering from the top of the screen. In addition, the game's six stages are laid out in a labyrinthine way, adding puzzle elements to the mix. In order to find, reach and defeat the game's final boss, the player would have to travel back and forth between the various stages to obtain a large assortment of keys. These keys then allow access to parts of other stages, even earlier ones. This traveling between the stages is highly unusual for a shoot 'em up.
