= Phoenix (manga) =

Japanese manga series by Osamu Tezuka

- Cover art of the Phoenix: Dawn 2009 reprint, featuring Hi no Tori

火の鳥 (Hi no Tori)
- Genre: Drama; Fantasy
- Manga
- Written by: Osamu Tezuka
- Published by: Gakudōsha
- English publisher: Viz Media
- Magazine: Manga Shōnen
- Original run: July 1954 – May 1955
- Volumes: 1
- Manga
- Written by: Osamu Tezuka
- Published by: Kodansha
- English publisher: Viz Media
- Magazine: Shōjo Club
- Original run: May 1956 – December 1957
- Volumes: 1
- Manga
- Written by: Osamu Tezuka
- Published by: Mushi Production (1967–1973); Asahi Sonorama (1976–1981); Kadokawa Shoten (1986–1988)
- English publisher: Viz Media
- Magazine: COM (1967–1973); Manga Shōnen (Asahi Sonorama) (1976–1981); Yasei Jidai (1986–1988)
- English magazine: NA: Pulp
- Original run: January 1967 – February 1988
- Volumes: 12
- Manga parts
- 1. Dawn (January – November 1967); 2. Future (December 1967 – September 1968); 3. Yamato (September 1968 – February 1969); 4. Space (March – July 1969); 5. Karma (August 1969 – September 1970); 6. Resurrection (October 1970 - September 1971); 7. A Robe of Feathers (October 1971); 8. Nostalgia (September 1976 – March 1978); 9. Civil War (April 1978 – July 1980); 10. Life (August – December 1980); 11. Strange Beings (January – April 1981); 12. Sun (January 1986 – February 1988)
Further information
Original video animation
Directed by	Rintaro (OVA 1); Toshio Hirata (OVA 2); Yoshiaki Kawajiri (OVA 3)
Produced by	Rintaro; Masao Maruyama; Yasuteru Iwase
Written by	Tomoko Konparu; Hideo Takayashiki
Music by	Fumio Miyashita
Studio	Madhouse; Team Argo Project
Released	OVA 1: Karma; December 20, 1986; OVA 2: Yamato; August 1, 1987; OVA 3: Space; December 21, 1987
Runtime	48–60 minutes
Episodes	3
Original net animation
Phoenix: Dougo Onsen Chapter
Directed by	Fumihiro Yoshimura
Produced by	Ryoutarou Hayashi (2); Gorou Kumatani (2-3); Hirotoshi Nonaka (3)
Written by	Taisuke Nishimura; Shouichirou Masumoto
Music by	Yuji Nomi
Studio	Tezuka Productions
Released	May 24, 2019 – November 20, 2020
Episodes	3
Original net animation
Phoenix: Eden17
Directed by	Shōjirō Nishimi
Produced by	Eiko Tanaka
Written by	Katsunari Mano; Saku Konohana
Music by	Takatsugu Muramatsu
Studio	Studio 4°C
Licensed by	Disney Platform Distribution
Released	September 13, 2023
Episodes	4
Anime film
Phoenix: Reminiscence of Flower
Directed by	Shōjirō Nishimi
Produced by	Eiko Tanaka
Written by	Katsunari Mano; Saku Konohana
Music by	Takatsugu Muramatsu
Studio	Studio 4°C
Released	November 3, 2023
Runtime	95 minutes
Other adaptations
Phoenix (1978 live-action film); Phoenix 2772 (1980 anime film); Phoenix (2004 anime TV series)
Video games
Hi no Tori Hououhen (1987); Hi no Tori Hououhen: Gaou no Bouken (1987)

Phoenix (火の鳥, Hi no Tori; "Bird of Fire") is Japanese manga series written and illustrated by Osamu Tezuka. Tezuka considered Phoenix his "life's work"; it consists of 12 parts, each of which tells a separate, self-contained story and takes place in a different era. The plots go back and forth from the remote future to prehistoric times. The story was never completed, having been cut short by Tezuka's death in 1989.

Several of the stories have been adapted into anime and a live-action film, along with a musical production by the Takarazuka Revue. As of 2008, the entire manga series is available in English-language translations.

== Overview ==
Phoenix is about reincarnation. Each story generally involves a search for immortality, embodied by the blood of the eponymous bird of fire, which, as drawn by Tezuka, resembles the Fenghuang. The blood is believed to grant eternal life, but immortality in Phoenix is either unobtainable or a terrible curse, whereas Buddhist-style reincarnation is presented as the natural path of life. The stories spring back and forth through time; the first, Dawn, takes place in ancient times, and the second, Future, takes place in the far future. Subsequent stories alternate between the past and future, allowing Tezuka to explore his themes in both historical and science fiction settings. Throughout the stories there are various recurring characters, some from Tezuka's famous star system. A character named Saruta appears repeatedly, for example, in the form of various ancestors and descendants, all of whom endure harsh trials in their respective eras.

Tezuka began work on a preliminary version of Phoenix in 1954, and the series continued in various forms until his death in 1989. As it progresses, the stories seemed to be converging on the present day. Due to Tezuka dying before the manga's completion, it is not known how this would have played out. Scholar and translator Frederik L. Schodt, who knew Tezuka in life, wrote that he fantasized about a secret ending, "waiting in a safe somewhere to be revealed posthumously". This was not the case, and Tezuka's final intentions with Phoenix remain unknown; its episodic nature leaves each volume highly accessible nonetheless. Many of the Phoenix stories feature an intensely experimental layout and visual design. For example, Universe tells the story of four spacefarers who are forced to leave their spaceship in separate escape pods. The panels of the story are organized such that each character has his own vertical or horizontal tier on the page, emphasizing the astronauts' isolation; the tiers combine and separate as characters join and split up. In an astonishing sequence after one character's death, he is represented for a number of pages by a series of empty black panels.

Tezuka was said to have been influenced to create the series after listening to the music of Igor Stravinsky. He also told that he created the image of Phoenix as he was impressed by the Firebird in director Ivan Ivanov-Vano's animation film Konyok Gorbunok (Soyuzmultfilm studio).

== Arcs ==
After several aborted serialization attempts in the 1950s, in Gakudōsha's Manga Shōnen and Kodansha's Shōjo Club magazines, Tezuka began Dawn in 1967, serialized in COM. The serialization of Phoenix would continue throughout his career, moving to Asahi Sonorama's Manga Shōnen magazine after COM's closure in the mid-70s. The final volume, Sun, was serialized in Yasei Jidai.

Dawn (黎明編, Reimei-hen)
The first volume, originally serialized in 1967. This story takes place in 240–70 AD, in the era of Queen Himiko of the Yamatai. Using her army, led by feudal general Sarutahiko, to invade the Kumaso, she seeks the Phoenix and eternal youth.
Future (未来編, Mirai-hen)

Cover of Phoenix: Future, C0M Masterpiece Comics edition, printed in 1968.

The second volume, originally serialized in 1967–68. In Phoenix's chronology, this is the final story chronologically, taking place near the end of mankind. In 3404, the world has become super-modernized, but humanity has reached its peak and shows decline. A young man named Masato Yamanobe is living with his girlfriend, Tamami, a shapeshifting alien. Pursued by Masato's boss, Rock, they eventually take shelter at the isolated base of mad scientist Dr. Saruta, who attempts to preserve life on Earth with the assistance of his robot, Robita. Eventually, nuclear war breaks out.
Yamato (ヤマト編, Yamato-hen)
The third volume, originally serialized in 1968–69. This story takes place in 320–50 (Kofun period), and is based on the Yamato-takeru-no-mikoto legend. The decadent king of Yamato is trying to have his own version of Japan's history written. Meanwhile, a "barbarian" tribe, the Kumaso, is writing an unbiased history. The king of Yamato sends his youngest son, Oguna, to murder the barbarian chief, Takeru. On his journey, Oguna encounters the Phoenix.
Universe (宇宙編, Uchū-hen)
The fourth volume, originally serialized in 1969; also known as Space. The story takes place in 2577 AD, where four astronauts must escape their ruined spaceship in escape pods. The survivors eventually crash into a mysterious planet. Among them is Saruta, who contends with Makimura for the heart of their female companion, Nana. On this strange planet, they eventually meet the Phoenix.
Karma (鳳凰編, Hō-ō-hen)
The fifth volume, originally serialized in 1969–1970. The story occurs in 720–752 AD, the period in which the Daibutsu of Tōdai-ji was built during the Nara period. One-eyed and one-armed young man Gao, an ancestor of Saruta, turns into a murderous bandit when he is rejected by his village. He attacks a sculptor, Akanemaru, and the two men's paths diverge, but their fates remain linked. Akanemaru becomes obsessed with the Phoenix to the point that he loses sight of his original dreams, while Gao eventually finds a state of grace despite his continuing hardships. Karma is widely considered the masterpiece of the Phoenix series. MSX and Famicom video games, both developed by Konami, were based on this volume.
Resurrection (復活編, Fukkatsu-hen)
The sixth volume, originally serialized in 1970–1971. The story takes place in 2482–3344 AD. In an age of robotics, technology and science, young Leon dies in a car accident. He is returned to life by scientific surgery, but his now mostly-artificial brain makes him see living things – including humans – as distorted clay figures, while he sees machines and robots as beauties. Leon falls in love with a worker robot, Chihiro, whom he sees as a beautiful girl, and would fight for this forbidden love. A side plot features the robot Robita, who previously appeared in Future.
Robe of Feathers (羽衣編, Hagoromo-hen)
Serialized in COM, 1971. Published in English by Viz as an appendix to the second volume of Civil War (Turbulent Times). Based on the story of the Hagoromo.
Nostalgia (望郷編, Bōkyō-hen)
Published in Manga Shōnen (Asahi Sononorama), 1976–1978. A science fiction epic about the rise and fall of civilization on the deceptively named desert planet of Eden and one boy's universe-spanning search for the planet of his ancestors: Earth. Features numerous cameos from other Science fiction-based Phoenix stories, including the shapeshifting alien "Moopies" first seen in Future, Makimura from Universe and an early model of the Chihiro robot from Resurrection. Black Jack also made an appearance here, under a different name.
Turbulent Times (乱世編, Ranse-hen)
Published in Manga Shōnen (Asahi Sonorama), 1978–1980. The story is about a woodcutter named Benta and his childhood sweetheart, Obu, who are separated and caught up in the events of the Genpei War. Various historical figures, such as Taira no Kiyomori, appear as major and minor characters. Although the character of Gao (from Ho-ō) appears as a 400-year-old hermit and thus links Ranse-hen to the rest of the series, this particular arc stands out for its much more naturalistic approach, with next to no fantasy elements in it (except for those used for comedic effect, such as telephones in the 12th century). The Viz (English) edition is entitled Civil War and is split into two volumes, with Robe of Feathers included as an appendix to the second volume.
Life (生命編, Seimei-hen)
Published in Manga Shōnen (Asahi Sonorama), 1980. A TV producer who attempts to procure human clones to use in a The Most Dangerous Game-style reality TV program learns the error of his ways when he is mistaken for a clone himself. This episode is notable for only featuring the Phoenix in flashbacks and also for introducing her half-human daughter who does not appear again after this episode.
Strange Beings (異形編, Igyō-hen)
Published in Manga Shōnen (Asahi Sonorama), 1981. The story of a female Buddhist nun (bhikkhuni) who is imprisoned in a time-warp by the Phoenix as punishment for her sins along with her faithful retainer and is forced to become a healer treating the victims of wars from all over time and space including humans, youkai and various extraterrestrials. This chapter was loosely based on the Hyakki Yakō emakimono by the famous Japanese artist Tosa Mitsunobu (although in the context of the story it's the complete opposite).
Sun (太陽編, Taiyō-hen)
Published in Yasei Jidai, 1986–88. This is the longest story, and was the final volume completed before Tezuka's death. It centers on Harima, a young Korean soldier from the Baekje Kingdom whose head is replaced with that of a wolf by Tang dynasty soldiers following the defeat of the joint Baekje-Yamato force at the Battle of Baekgang. He then escapes to Japan where he becomes the feudal lord Inugami and becomes caught in the middle of the Jinshin War, as well as joining a greater battle between supernatural forces and time-travelling to a bleak future world ruled by a theocracy that claimed to have captured the Phoenix. This chapter stands in stark contrast to the earlier historical Phoenix stories, which tended to de-mythologize the mythical characters therein, for instance in Dawn, many Shinto gods are portrayed as mere humans. In this chapter, however, a wide variety of mythical creatures are shown fighting against Bodhisattva.
Early Works
Covers the prototype arcs of the series from the 1950s: the unfinished Manga Shōnen version of the Dawn arc from 1954–55, and the Egypt, Greece and Rome arcs that ran in Shōjo Club from 1956–57.

=== Characters ===
- Hi no Tori: Keiko Takeshita/Suzanne Gilad
- Saruta: Tetsuo Komura/Danny Burstein
- Narrator: Akira Kume/Robert O'Gorman

Dawn

- Nagi: Takeuchi Junko/Michelle Newman
- Sarutahiko: Tetsuo Komura
- Himiko: Ryōko Kinomiya/Fiona Jones
- Hinaku: Sakiko Tamagawa/Carrie Keranen
- Susanoo: Eizo Tsuda/James Urbaniak
- Guzuri: Michio Nakao/Jay Snyder
- Ama no Yumihiko: Masaki Terasoma/Addie Blaustein
- Ninigi: Akio Ōtsuka/Richard Epcar
- Shaman: Hikaru Miyata
- Soldier: Yousuke Akimoto
- Uzume: Yumi Nakatani/Erica Schroeder
- Uraji: Yūsaku Yara/Marc Diraison
- Ojiji: Eisuke Yoda/Richard Springle
- Obaba: Natsuko Sebata
- Soldier: Dai Matsumoto
- Kumaso Takeru: Daisuke Namikawa
- Yazuchi: Hirofumi Nojima
- Fuki: Akiko Nakagawa
- Tajikarao: Toshihide Tsuchiya
- Kamamushi: Shōzō Iizuka/David Brimmer
- Chamberlain: Mahito Tsujimura

Resurrection

- Leona: Sasaki Nozomu/Christopher Kromer
- Lamp: Masashi Hirose/Mike Pollock
- Chihiro: Misa Kobayashi/Eden Riegel
- Nielsen: Shinji Ogawa/Ted Lewis
- Reiko: Fumiko Osaka/Kathleen McInerney
- Leona's Father: Mantarô Iwao/Marc Thompson
- Young Leona: Reiko Takagi/Christopher Kromer

Strange creatures

- Sakonnosuke: Mayumi Asano/Kathleen McInerney
- Yagi Iemasa: Tetsuo Komura
- Yaobikuni: Tamie Kubota
- Kahei: Bin Shimada/Mike Pollock
- Haniwa Jindayu: Kazuhiko Kishino

Sun

- Inugami no Sukune/Harima: Yasunori Matsumoto/Gary Littman
- Obaba: Seiko Tomoe/Barbara Goodson
- Azumi-no-Muraji Saruta: Tetsuo Komura
- Marimo: Ai Uchikawa/Michelle Ruff
- Emperor Tenji: Masaru Ikeda/Steven Jay Blum
- Ōama no Miko: Naoya Uchida/Crispin Freeman
- Ibukimaru: Daisuke Gouri/Michael McConnohie
- Empress Consort: Atsuko Koganezawa
- Ōtomo no Miko: Hiroshi Kamiya/Liam O'Brien
- Prince Takechi: Kenji Nojima/Sebastian Arcelus
- Tang General: Koichi Sakaguchi
- Soldier: Kouji Haramaki
- Hoben: Tamio Ohki/Richard Toth
- Getsudan: Hisao Egawa
- Nichidan: Hiroshi Iwasaki
- Mokudan: Kousei Hirota
- Kadan: Naomi Kusumi
- Kokushi: Yutaka Nakano
- Rubetsu: Takayuki Sugo/Jay Snyder
- Iki no Karakuni: Takeshi Watabe/Richard Epcar
- Soga no Hatayasu: Yuzuru Fujimoto/John Avner
- Soga no Yasumaro: Eiji Yanagisawa

Future

- Masato Yamanobe: Daisuke Namikawa/Michael Sinterniklaas
- Robita: Shigeru Ushiyama
- Rock: Takuya Kirimoto/Eric Stuart
- Old Masato: Osamu Saka/Michael McConnohie
- Tamami: Yumi Touma/Stephanie Sheh
- Girl: Akiko Nakagawa
- Adam: Takahiro Mizushima

Eden17

- Com: Honoka Yoshida
- George: Yōsuke Kubozuka
- Romi: Rie Miyazawa
- Sudarban: Issey Ogata
- Makimura: Shintarō Asanuma
- Cain: Ryōhei Kimura

== Publication ==
Publication timeline
Title	Arc	Magazine	Period	Notes
Phoenix (Manga Shōnen (Gakudōsha)) (1954–1955)	Dawn (Manga Shōnen)	Manga Shōnen (Gakudōsha)	July 1954-May 1955	An early version of the Dawn arc. It was put on hold after eight chapters and was left unfinished due to Manga Shōnen's discontinuation.
Phoenix (Shōjo Club) (1956–1957)	Egypt	Shojo Club	May 1956-October 1956	A reworked version of Phoenix aimed at young girls.
Phoenix (Shōjo Club) (1956–1957)	Greece	Shojo Club	November 1956-July 1957	A reworked version of Phoenix aimed at young girls.
Phoenix (Shōjo Club) (1956–1957)	Rome	Shojo Club	August 1957-December 1957	A reworked version of Phoenix aimed at young girls.
Phoenix (COM, Manga Shōnen (Asahi Sonorama), and Yasei Jidai) (1967–1988)	Dawn	COM	January 1967-November 1967	The first part of Phoenix and a reworked version of the Dawn arc in Manga Shōnen (Gakudōsha).
Phoenix (COM, Manga Shōnen (Asahi Sonorama), and Yasei Jidai) (1967–1988)	Future	COM	December 1967-September 1968	
Phoenix (COM, Manga Shōnen (Asahi Sonorama), and Yasei Jidai) (1967–1988)	Yamato	COM	September 1968-February 1969	
Phoenix (COM, Manga Shōnen (Asahi Sonorama), and Yasei Jidai) (1967–1988)	Space	COM	March 1969-July 1969	
Phoenix (COM, Manga Shōnen (Asahi Sonorama), and Yasei Jidai) (1967–1988)	Karma	COM	August 1969-September 1970	
Phoenix (COM, Manga Shōnen (Asahi Sonorama), and Yasei Jidai) (1967–1988)	Resurrection	COM	October 1970-September 1971	
Phoenix (COM, Manga Shōnen (Asahi Sonorama), and Yasei Jidai) (1967–1988)	Robe of Feathers	COM	October 1971	
Phoenix (COM, Manga Shōnen (Asahi Sonorama), and Yasei Jidai) (1967–1988)	Intermission	COM	November 1971	A short, one-shot essay manga that goes into detail on the production of Phoenix.
Phoenix (COM, Manga Shōnen (Asahi Sonorama), and Yasei Jidai) (1967–1988)	Nostalgia (COM)	COM (COM Comics)	December 1971-January 1972	An early version of the Nostalgia arc. Discontinued after two chapters.
Phoenix (COM, Manga Shōnen (Asahi Sonorama), and Yasei Jidai) (1967–1988)	Civil War (COM)	COM	August 1973	An early version of the Civil War arc, cancelled after a single chapter due to COM's discontinuation.
Phoenix (COM, Manga Shōnen (Asahi Sonorama), and Yasei Jidai) (1967–1988)	Nostalgia	Manga Shōnen (Asahi Sonorama)	September 1976-March 1977	
Phoenix (COM, Manga Shōnen (Asahi Sonorama), and Yasei Jidai) (1967–1988)	Civil War	Manga Shōnen (Asahi Sonorama)	April 1978-July 1980	
Phoenix (COM, Manga Shōnen (Asahi Sonorama), and Yasei Jidai) (1967–1988)	Life	Manga Shōnen (Asahi Sonorama)	August 1980-December 1980	
Phoenix (COM, Manga Shōnen (Asahi Sonorama), and Yasei Jidai) (1967–1988)	Strange Beings	Manga Shōnen (Asahi Sonorama)	January 1981-April 1981	
Phoenix (COM, Manga Shōnen (Asahi Sonorama), and Yasei Jidai) (1967–1988)	Sun	Yasei Jidai	January 1986- February 1988	The final part of Phoenix to be completed during Tezuka's lifetime.

=== English edition ===
Phoenix is currently published in English by Viz Communications. Although the second volume was initially published by the now defunct Pulp manga anthology in a larger edition, in 2002, Viz took over the rest of the manga series, and re-released the second volume. Frederik Schodt, Jared Cook, Shinji Sakamoto, and Midori Ueda, members of a Tokyo group called "Dadakai", had already translated the first five volumes of the series around 1977/78, but after handing these translation to Tezuka Productions, they collected dust for nearly twenty-five years. Finally, Schodt and Cook finished translating the rest of the series and Viz published the entire series in English, starting in 2002 and completing it in March 2008. It has been criticized for being a dumbing-down, including overlapping artwork with unnecessary new narration, and altering character names (such as Sarutahiko to Saruta) to make their reincarnations more obvious to the reader. However, Tezuka was known to update his manga every few years, so the U.S. version could reflect the last known edition of the series.

The Viz editions are released "flipped" (the original right-to-left orientation is reversed for easier reading in English). Some of the shorter stories have been consolidated into one book (based on the Japanese publication), and Troubled Times has been split across two; this resulted in each Viz book having a similar page count. While many of the actual Viz books are out of print, they became available again through digital purchase on Kindle. Viz later offered the digital version of Phoenix manga in 2014.

==== Volumes in English ====
Phoenix, Vol. 6: Nostalgia cover

Vol. 1 – Dawn
Released March 2003.
Vol. 2 – A Tale of the Future / Future
This volume was released first, in May 2002, as a stand-alone graphic novel; Dawn was released a year later, as Vol. 1, followed by the rest of the series. A Tale of the Future was initially released in a larger size; the series releases, starting with Dawn, are digest-sized. A Tale of the Future was reprinted in the smaller size in 2004, titled Future, with Vol. 2 appended to the title.
Vol. 3 – Yamato / Space
Collects Yamato and Space in one book; released November 2003.
Vol. 4 – Karma
Originally titled Ho-ō; released May 2004. Listed at #2 in Time Magazine's "Best Comix of 2004".
Vol. 5 – Resurrection
Released December 14, 2004.
Vol. 6 – Nostalgia
Released March 26, 2006.
Vol. 7 – Civil War, Part 1
Originally titled Troubled Times, and here split into two books; the first was released June 13, 2006.
Vol. 8 – Civil War, Part 2 / Robe of Feathers
Collects the ending of Troubled Times, and includes Robe of Feathers; released September 12, 2006.
Vol. 9 – Strange Beings / Life
Collects Strange Beings and Life in one book; released December 19, 2006.
Vol. 10 – Sun, Part 1
Released March 20, 2007.
Vol. 11 – Sun, Part 2
Released September 18, 2007.
Vol. 12 – Early Works
Released March 18, 2008.

== Adaptations ==
=== Live-action film ===
A live-action film based on the Dawn storyline, directed by Kon Ichikawa and including some animated sequences directed by Tezuka, was released in 1978. The cast included Tomisaburo Wakayama and Tatsuya Nakadai. It was released in the United States on VHS by Video Action under the cover title The Phoenix (Hinotori) in 1982, using a subtitled print, letterboxed only in the split-screen sequence. To date, the film is available on DVD only in Spain, where it is titled Fénix. The film included a brief appearance by Astro Boy, substituting for another character to illustrate his attempts to get on a horse. The score was co-composed by Michel Legrand and Jun Fukamachi.

=== Anime ===
Most volumes of Phoenix were adapted into anime. The best-known feature film, Phoenix 2772, loosely adapts elements from various Phoenix volumes and other Tezuka works into a complete whole cloth scenario. A second animated feature, Phoenix: Karma Chapter was released on December 20, 1986, and was later succeeded by two sequel OVAs, Yamato Chapter and Space Chapter, in 1987.

A 13-episode anime television series aired in 2004 in Japan, and was released in English in October 2007 by Anime Works. The anime premiered in Jamaica on CVM Television in June 2017. A short film by the same staff as the TV series, Phoenix: Robe of Feathers, was released on July 17, 2004.

Dōgo Onsen hot spring bathhouse released a three-episode net anime collaboration with Phoenix in 2019–2020.

A four-episode anime ONA adaptation by Studio 4°C, titled Phoenix: Eden17, premiered worldwide on Disney+ (U.S. on Hulu) on September 13, 2023. It was directed by Shōjirō Nishimi, with character designs and animations handled by Tatsuzou Nishida, Eiko Tanaka serving as producer, and Katsunari Mano and Saku Konohana writing the series' scripts. A film version with a different ending, Phoenix: Reminiscence of Flower, premiered in Japanese theaters on November 3 of the same year.

=== Video games ===
In 1987, Konami adapted the Karma arc to the MSX2 computer and the Famicom game console. Despite being based on the same material, they are completely different games (a vertical shoot 'em up and a horizontal platformer, respectively) produced by separate teams.

The Phoenix also made a cameo appearance in the 2003 Astro Boy series and 2004 Astro Boy: Omega Factor game for the Nintendo Game Boy Advance, along with a number of other Tezuka characters.

- Hi no Tori Hououhen (1987, MSX2)
- Hi no Tori Hououhen: Gaou no Bouken (1987, Famicom)
- Black Jack Hinotorihen (2006, Nintendo DS)
- DS de Yomu Series: Tezuka Osamu Hi no Tori 1 (2008, Nintendo DS)
- DS de Yomu Series: Tezuka Osamu Hi no Tori 2 (2008, Nintendo DS)
- DS de Yomu Series: Tezuka Osamu Hi no Tori 3 (2008, Nintendo DS)

== Reception and legacy ==
Phoenix is considered one of the greatest manga of all time, and is often ranked as one of Tezuka's greatest manga. In 2006, Phoenix ranked 1st in the Japan Media Arts Festival's special 'professionals' ranking (consisting of critics, editors, people working in the industry, etc.) for the greatest manga of all time, which it held to mark its 10th anniversary. In a 2009 poll held by Asahi Shimbun for 'Greatest Shōwa Manga', Phoenix ranked 12th, the 3rd highest Tezuka manga behind Astro Boy and Black Jack.

Mangaka Naoki Urasawa has spoken about how the first time he read Phoenix he was shocked that a work of this quality existed, and that since reading it, he has never been as significantly impacted by anything since, so much so that he would mark it as the moment he became an adult. Comic magazine editor Martin Skidmore called it a 'real contender for comics' greatest work of any kind'. The Japan Times has referred to it as 'Japanese pop culture at its zenith', stating that it draws critical comparisons to 'everything from Shakespearean tragedy to early Walt Disney'. In an interview, mangaka Hitoshi Iwaaki named it among his favorite manga. In her book 'The Art of Osamu Tezuka: God of Manga', Helen McCarthy says it has 'a strong claim to be considered a contemporary equivalent of Wagner's Ring cycle'. IGN, in their review of Vol. 10, stated 'You've read nothing like this, and it's doubtful you ever will again.' Video game designer Yuji Horii and manga artist Katsuhiro Otomo stated it to be among their favorite Tezuka manga.

Critic Andrew D. Arnold, writing for Time Magazine, in reviewing the 'Karma' arc stated that it was 'one of the few comix to go beyond supreme artistry into the sublime' and that 'one can barely touch upon the depths of this deeply sophisticated work in the confines of a review. It would take something more along the lines of an exegesis. Tezuka has created a book that combines the excitement, plotting, and characterization of the best novels with the philosophy of the best spiritual essays and the beauty of the graphical arts into a singular masterpiece of world fiction', and that while it is 'as entertaining as any comic can be, it miraculously also achieves what lesser religious comix strive for and fail at: enlightenment.'

The titular Phoenix is considered an icon of manga, and a sculpture of the character is featured as a prominent permanent exhibition in the Kyoto International Manga Museum. A statute of the Phoenix is also featured outside the Osamu Tezuka Manga Museum.

The Resurrection arc of Phoenix inspired the lyrical theme of the 2018 song "M.D.O." by heavy metal band Lovebites. In celebration of what would have been Tezuka's 90th birthday, Evil Line Records released the compilation album New Gene, Inspired from Phoenix on October 30, 2019. It features songs inspired by Phoenix written and performed by various artists, including Glim Spanky, Kizuna AI, Tavito Nanao and Naotarō Moriyama.

== See also ==
- List of Osamu Tezuka anime
- List of Osamu Tezuka manga
- Osamu Tezuka's Star System
