= Hi no Tori Hououhen: Gaou no Bouken =

1987 video game

- Cover art
- Developer(s): Konami
- Publisher(s): Konami
- Composer(s): Kinuyo Yamashita; Hidenori Maezawa; Iku Mizutani
- Platform(s): Famicom
- Release: JP: January 4, 1987
- Genre(s): Action
- Mode(s): Single-player

Hi no Tori Hououhen: Gaou no Bouken (火の鳥 鳳(ほう)凰(おう)編(へん) 我(が)王(おう)の冒(ぼう)険(けん), "Phoenix Chronicles: Gaou's Adventure") is a 1987 video game for the Famicom developed by Konami, produced alongside a similarly named game for the MSX. Both games are based on the manga series Phoenix created by renowned Japanese manga artist Osamu Tezuka.

== Setting ==
As a child, a young boy named Gaou lost an arm and an eye, and as a result, from a young age he was discriminated against and teased, unable to fit in with his peers. The constant ridicule and persecution caused Gaou to become bitter, and hardened, eventually turning to a life as a thief. In spite of his wicked and corrupt lifestyle, Gaou met a woman who saw goodness in him, and the two were married. One day, over nothing more than a trifling disagreement, Gaou lost control of himself, and killed his wife. Realization of what he had done caused Gaou to deeply regret his wicked deeds, and reform his behavior. Gaou encountered a Buddhist monk who helped him change his ways, and discover his passion for sculpting. Renouncing his previous life of violence, Gaou became a Buddhist sculptor, devoting himself to the creation of magnificent sculptures renowned for the raw and powerful emotions he was able to invoke in his work. One day, together with a fellow sculptor Akanemaru, Gaou encountered a mythical phoenix, who, according to legend, can bestow eternal life to those who drink its blood. Inspired, Gaou devotes himself to the creation of a magnificent phoenix sculpture. However, shortly after finishing the sculpture, it was stolen from him, broken into 16 pieces, and hidden in different time periods of the past and the future. In order to recover the 16 phoenix sculpture pieces, Gaou embarked on a perilous journey that would take him through space and time.

== Gameplay ==
Gaou no Bouken is an action-platforming game. The player's objective is to guide Gaou through each of the game's 16 levels to collect the 16 sculpture fragments, and restore the phoenix sculpture. By defeating a boss awaiting him at the end of each stage, Gaou can claim one of the sculpture fragments and clear the level. In certain levels, instead of a boss, Gaou must avoid a trap such as falling rocks, or destroy an impeding wall in order to progress.

The game makes use of a life system in which Gaou has three lives, each life comprising a limited number of hit points. When Gaou comes into contact with an enemy or an enemy's projectile, he would lose one hit point. When his hit points are reduced to zero, he will lose one of his three lives. Falling in a pit or failing to complete the level before the timer runs out would also result in Gaou losing a life. Additionally, if Gaou finds himself in a situation where he is trapped and unable to progress, the player can press the select button, causing Gaou to self-destruct and restart the level. If Gaou loses all three of his lives, the player will encounter a game over screen, and have the option of continuing from the beginning of the current stage.
