= Shōjo Club =

Japanese girls' magazine

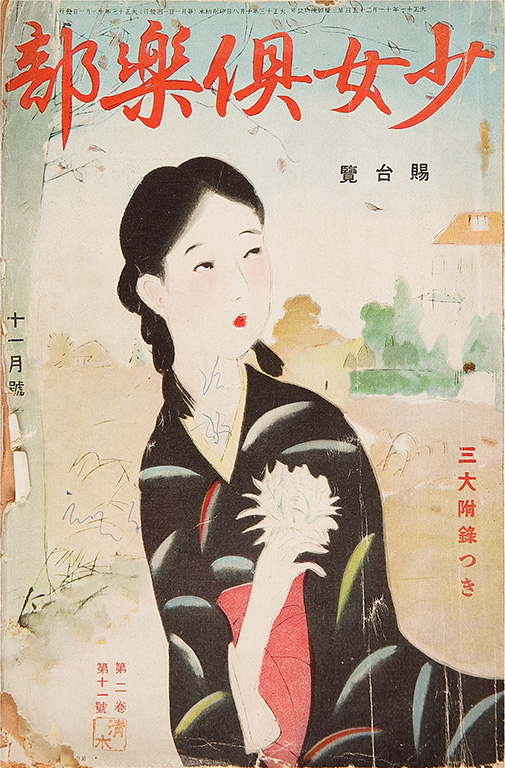
- Cover of the November 1924 issue
- Categories: Shōjo, women's magazine
- Frequency: Monthly
- Publisher: Kodansha
- Founder: Seiji Noma
- First issue: January 1923; 103 years ago
- Final issue: December 1962; 63 years ago
- Country: Japan
- Language: Japanese

Shōjo Club (Japanese: 少女クラブ, Hepburn: Shōjo kurabu; lit. 'Girls' Club') was a monthly Japanese shōjo (girls) magazine. Founded by the publishing company Kodansha in 1923 as a sister publication to its magazine Shōnen Club, the magazine published articles, short stories, illustrations, poems, and manga.

Shōjo Club was one of the earliest shōjo magazines, and by 1937 was the best-selling magazine in Japan aimed at this market segment. Its conservative editorial stance, aligned with that of its publisher Kodansha, was reflected in the magazine's focus on educational content, especially moral education.

The magazine and its primary competitor Shōjo no tomo were the sole shōjo magazines to continue publication throughout the entirety of the Pacific War. The magazine eventually succumbed to changing market conditions in 1962, and was replaced in 1963 with the weekly magazine Shōjo Friend.

== Content ==
Shōjo Club was a general women's magazine targeting an audience of shōjo, a term for teenaged girls. It published educational articles, short stories, poetry, illustrations, and manga, though unlike other shōjo magazines, it published very few contributions from readers. Shōjo Club had a conservative editorial stance aligned with the editorial stance of its publisher Kodansha, though it rarely published overt social or political criticism. The magazine placed particular emphasis on educational content, especially moral education, as represented by its slogan of "textbook in the left hand, Shōjo Club in the right hand".

== Context ==
The Women's Higher School Act was issued in 1899, which standardized female education and established optional formal education options for girls beyond compulsory elementary education. Girls education was aligned with the "Good Wife, Wise Mother" social doctrine, mandating schools to teach girls moral training, sewing, and housekeeping. These reforms established "shōjo" as a new social category of women, designating girls in the period between childhood and marriage.

Contemporaneously, mass media in Japan was growing rapidly and expanding into new markets, leading to a proliferation of magazines dedicated to an audience of shōjo that were published as sister magazines to existing shōnen (boys') magazines. While shōjo magazines of this era were fundamentally aligned with the "Good Wife, Wise Mother" ideal, some magazines took a conservative stance that emphasized moral education, while others took a liberal stance that encouraged ideals of sisterhood and the development of artistic skills; a notable example of the latter is Shōjo no Tomo, which would become the main competitor to Shōjo Club.

== History ==
=== Pre-war (1923–1937) ===
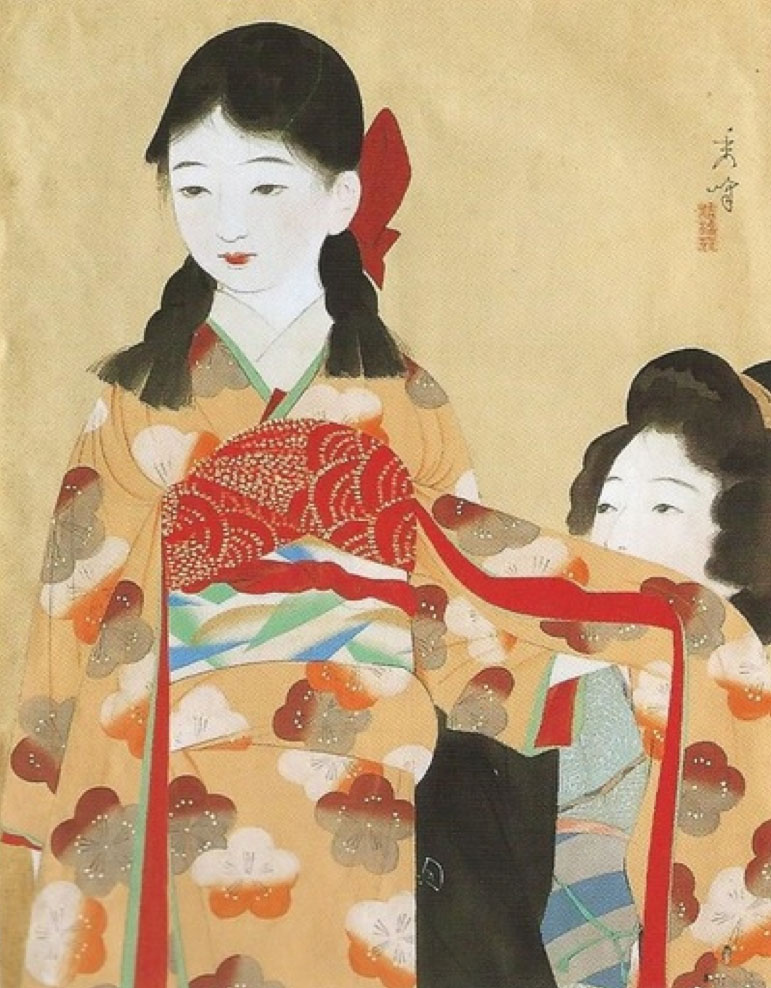
Frontispiece for the short story Haha no Ai (母の愛; lit. "A Mother's Love"), illustrated by Yamakawa Shūhō and published in the January 1927 issue

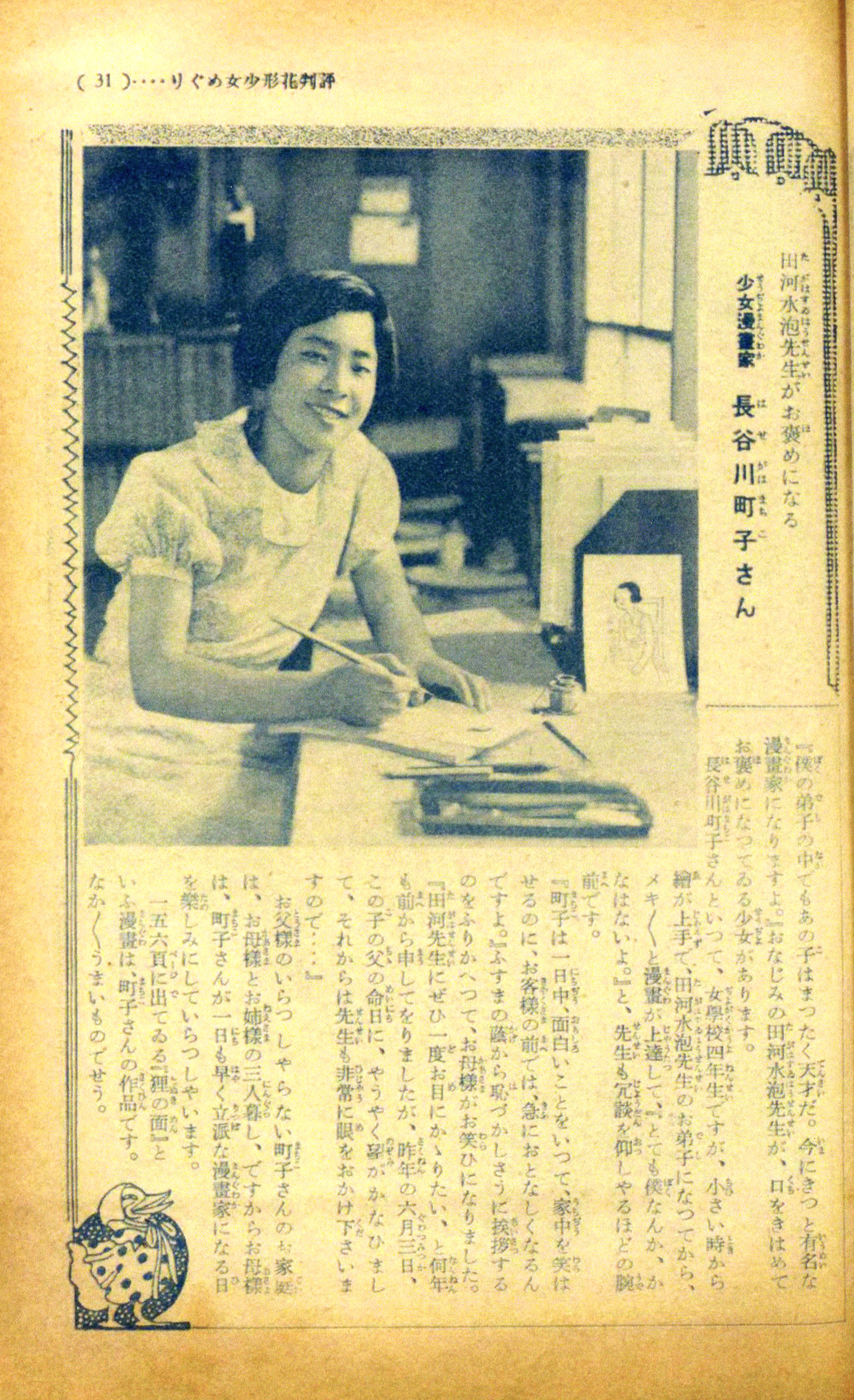
Article in the October 1935 issue on Machiko Hasegawa's debut as a manga artist at the age of 15

Seiji Noma, the founder of the publishing house Kodansha, launched Shōjo Club as a companion to the publisher's magazine Shōnen Club in January 1923. Like other Kodansha publications, Shōjo Club was dedicated to the moral education of its readership and aimed, in Noma's words, to instill in its female readers "the inner modesty and fortitude of samurai women". The magazine's articles were mainly educational in nature, and aligned with girls' school curriculums. The magazine additionally published literature, such as Class S short stories by Nobuko Yoshiya, illustrations by artists such as Kashō Takabatake, and manga by artists such as Suihō Tagawa. The magazine had a circulation of 67,000 in 1923 that grew to 492,000 by 1937, making Shōjo Club the best-selling magazine in Japan aimed at teenage girls.

=== Wartime (1937–1945) ===
The National Mobilization Law was passed in 1938 amid the Second Sino-Japanese War, which obligated the Japanese press to support the war effort and subjected publishers to increased scrutiny and censorship, though both Shōjo Club (and Kodansha broadly) closely collaborated with the government to support the war effort. Women's magazines faced particular criticism for their "sentimentality", leading to a decline in Class S literature and the reorientation of editorial content to emphasize patriotism. The war also brought about a paper shortage that peaked in 1945, forcing many magazines to fold, though Shōjo Club and Shōjo no Tomo were the sole shōjo magazines to continue publication throughout the entirety of the war.

=== Post-war (1945–1962) ===
Following the Surrender of Japan in 1945, Kodansha's publications pivoted from their pro-war stance to content on life in the post-war period, such as articles on how individuals could cope with ongoing food shortages. The Civil Information and Education department of the Supreme Commander for the Allied Powers was tasked with westernizing Japanese media, while the Civil Censorship Department enforced strict censorship of media. In response, Kodansha shifted the editorial content of Shōjo Club to be "enjoyable, fun, and bright".

Changes included the alteration of the spelling of the magazine's title from 少女倶楽部 to 少女クラブ to incorporate katakana, the reorientation of the target demographic of the magazine from middle school-aged girls to elementary school-aged girls, and a decline in Class S stories in favor of stories about families. Manga came to occupy an increasing proportion of the content of the magazine, especially after the success of Osamu Tezuka's manga series Princess Knight, which was serialized in the magazine from 1953 to 1956. Many popular manga artists, such as Shōtarō Ishinomori, Hideko Mizuno, Fujio Akatsuka, and Tetsuya Chiba would contribute to Shōjo Club; Toshiko Ueda also serialized the manga series Fuichin-san beginning in 1957, the title character of which became the magazine's mascot.

== Cessation ==
The dominant position that shōjo magazines occupied in teenage entertainment began to diminish in the post-war period, as the medium faced competition in the form of new categories of mass entertainment such as cinema, kashi-hon (rental) manga, and junia shōsetsu (ジュニア小説; "junior novels", the precursor to contemporary light novels). With the folding of Shōjo no Tomo in 1955, Shōjo Club became the sole remaining pre-war shōjo magazine amid an increasing number of new post-war magazines, such as Ribon and Himawari; Kodansha would itself launch a second shōjo magazine, Nakayoshi, in 1954.

The rise of television in the 1960s led to major upheaval in Japanese magazine publishing, and in 1962 Kodansha discontinued Shōjo Club, publishing the final issue of the magazine in December of that year. Shōjo Club was replaced with the weekly magazine Shōjo Friend, which published its first issue in January 1963.
