= Embassy of Japan, Kingston =

Japanese embassy in Jamaica

- Location: Kingston, Jamaica
- Address: 6th Floor, NCB Towers, North Tower, 2 Oxford Road
- Coordinates: 18.00074°N 76.78341°W
- Jurisdiction: Jamaica, The Bahamas, Belize
- Website: Official website

The Embassy of Japan in Kingston is the official diplomatic mission of Japan in Jamaica, and is also accredited to Belize and The Bahamas. Its current ambassador extraordinary and plenipotentiary is Yasuhiro Atsumi.

The embassy sponsors cultural events such as cosplay competitions and film festivals. In August 2023, it announced that it will invest J$50 million in the construction of a Japanese garden at the Hope Botanical Gardens in St. Andrew.
