= Princess Knight =

Japanese manga series by Osamu Tezuka

- The cover for the first volume of Princess Knight from the Osamu Tezuka Manga Complete Works edition

リボンの騎士 (Ribbon no Kishi)
- Genre: Fantasy
- Manga
- Written by: Osamu Tezuka
- Published by: Kodansha
- Magazine: Shōjo Club
- Original run: January 1953 – January 1956
- Volumes: 3
- Manga

The Twin Knights
- Written by: Osamu Tezuka
- Published by: Kodansha
- English publisher: NA: Vertical
- Magazine: Nakayoshi
- Original run: January 1958 – June 1958
- Volumes: 1
- Manga
- Written by: Osamu Tezuka
- Published by: Kodansha
- English publisher: JP: Kodansha (bilingual); NA: Vertical
- Magazine: Nakayoshi
- Original run: January 1963 – October 1966
- Volumes: 5
- Manga
- Written by: Osamu Tezuka
- Illustrated by: Kitano Hideaki
- Published by: Kodansha
- Magazine: Shōjo Friend
- Original run: April 1967 – April 1968
- Volumes: 1
- Anime television series
- Directed by: Osamu Tezuka; Chikao Katsui; Kanji Akabori
- Produced by: Tadayoshi Watanabe; Kazuyuki Hirokawa
- Music by: Isao Tomita
- Studio: Mushi Production
- Licensed by: AUS: Hanabee Entertainment; NA: Nozomi Entertainment; UK: Movie Makers; Tasley Leisures; Starlite Group
- Original network: Fuji TV
- English network: AU: Seven Network; IN: StarPlus; UK: The Children's Channel, Sky One; ZA: Bop TV
- Original run: April 2, 1967 – April 7, 1968
- Episodes: 52
- Anime film
- Directed by: Masayoshi Nishida
- Produced by: Minoru Kubota; Sumio Udagawa
- Written by: Mayumi Morita
- Music by: Tomoki Hasegawa
- Studio: Media Vision
- Released: 1999
- Runtime: 8 minutes
- Anime film
- The Ribbon Hero (2026)

Princess Knight, also known as Ribbon no Kishi, (Note: Ribbon no Kishi is originally written リボンの騎士, which is translated by Schodt (1996) as "A Knight in Ribbons", Gravett (2004) as "Knight in Ribbons", and by Power (2009) as "Knight with a ribbon".) is a Japanese manga series written and illustrated by Osamu Tezuka. This manga follows the adventures of Sapphire, a girl who was born accidentally with the blue heart of a boy and the pink heart of a girl. She pretends to be a prince to prevent the evil Duke Duralumin from taking over the kingdom through his son, Plastic. The gender-bending main character was inspired by the all-female musical theater group Takarazuka Revue in which women performed both female and male roles.

The story was ordered by an editor of Kodansha's magazine Shōjo Club who wanted Tezuka to produce a manga aimed towards a female audience that could replicate the success of his former boy-aimed stories. The author then created Princess Knight, originally serialized in that magazine from 1953 to 1956. The manga's popularity resulted into a radio dramatization in 1955, three other serializations between 1958 and 1968, and a 52-episode television anime series by Mushi Production that aired on Fuji TV from 1967 to 1968. It has also influenced several stage musicals since the 1980s and inspired remakes of the work by other authors. An anime film adaptation titled The Ribbon Hero was released on Netflix August 8, 2026.

The series' arrival in the English-speaking market was delayed by NBC Enterprises executives' perception that it could be interpreted as "sex switch". However, still in the 1970s, the television series got a dubbed version produced by Joe Oriolo. Renamed Choppy and the Princess, it was released to American, Australian, and British television audiences, with home video releases to follow. The manga would only reach the anglophone public years later, in 2001 when Kodansha International published a bilingual edition of Princess Knight, which was followed by a newer version by Vertical in 2011.

One of Tezuka's most famous works and widely regarded as a classic, Princess Knight has been very influential in the manga and anime industry. Its portrayal of gender roles is ambiguously interpreted by critics; some claim it has pro-feminist ideals and others think it expresses misogynist ideals of 1950s–60s Japanese society. Nonetheless, it started a tradition of androgynous-like heroines and established several trends in shōjo manga. It is considered one of the first works in this genre that is narrative-focused and that portrays a female superhero.

== Plot ==
Taking place in a medieval European-like fairy tale setting, Princess Knight is the story of Sapphire, who must pretend to be a male prince, so she can inherit the throne of Silverland as women are not eligible to do so. When she is born, her father, the King, announces his baby is a boy instead of a girl. The reason for this is that the next-in-line to the throne, Duke Duralumin, (Note: Originally known as "Duke of Duralumin" (ジュラルミン大公, Jurarumin Taikō), the name "Duralumin" was preserved in the English translation of Vertical. In the Right Stuf release, the character was named "Duralumon". He is also sometimes referred to as "Jeralmin".) is an evil man who would repress the people if his son, Plastic, were to become king. Duralumin and his henchman Baron Nylon often scheme to take over the kingdom and attempt to prove that Sapphire is really a girl. Sapphire can keep the façade because, when she was born, she received the blue heart of a boy as well as the pink heart of a girl. Because of this, God sent Tink, (Note: Originally known as "Tink" (チンク, Tinku), the name was preserved in the English translation of Vertical. In the anime versions, both in Joe Oriolo's first translation and the Right Stuf release, the character was named "Choppy".) a young angel-in-training, down to Earth to retrieve Sapphire's extra heart. Sapphire would not let Tink remove her boy's heart, however.

Sapphire and Tink experience a variety of adventures, including encounters with Satan, (Note: Originally known as "Devil Mephisto" (魔王メフィスト, Maō Mefisuto), the names "Satan" and "King Satan" have been used for both the manga and the anime in English.) a warlock who wants to steal Sapphire's special two-hearted soul and take over the kingdom. However, he is always frustrated by Tink and his fear of angels, and by his own daughter, Hecate, (Note: Originally known as "Hekate" (ヘケート, Hekēto), in Vertical's translation the character name is "Hecate".) a demonic-shapeshifting witch who at first appears to be evil like her father, but who covertly helps Sapphire foil her father's plans. Sapphire also dons a Zorro-style mask at night, fighting crime as the Phantom Knight, and gets involved with Franz Charming, the young prince of neighboring Goldland. Their relationship is multi-faceted; Franz is familiar with Sapphire as three entirely different people and has different feelings toward each. He is good friends with Prince Sapphire, is in love with the unnamed princess, and despises the Phantom Knight, who he believes is a rival for the Princess's affection.

As the story progresses, Duralumin stages a coup d'état to conquer Silverland, following the orders of Mr. X, a large man clad entirely in boxy red armor and the ruler of the X-Union, a neighboring, proto-fascist federation of nations that wants to conquer the three kingdoms (Silverland, Goldland, and Charcoal-land). The King and Queen are captured, but help Sapphire to flee. Duralumin is about to proclaim his son king and himself as regent when he is assassinated by Nylon, who has been driven near-insane by the Duke's constant abuse. The mentally deranged Nylon proclaims himself and welcomes Mr. X and his armies to Silverland. Mr. X, though, soon makes it clear that he has no intention of letting Nylon rule, even as a puppet monarch, and merely keeps him around as a churlish buffoon.

Sapphire and Franz try to prevent the King and Queen from being executed, but they are too late and the King and Queen are dropped in the sea. This culminates in the final battle, as Sapphire heads off to Silverland castle to confront Mr. X with the aid of three magic balls. Given to Sapphire by her parents, the balls represent the three kingdoms and are supposed to save Silverland: they are used at first to ring the kingdom's bells, magically giving to the people the will to fight the invaders.

Sapphire has the balls melted to form a magic axe, which she uses to rout Mr. X's troops, break up the castle's walls, and confront X himself. Sapphire ends up dueling Mr. X, with the help of Franz, and manages to wound him. Just as the enraged Mr. X is about to chop Sapphire and Franz in half, Tink calls on God for help, and a lightning bolt strikes Mr. X. As Sapphire seems to triumph, Mr. X rises from his apparent death and begins smashing the castle with his bare hands, eventually causing it to collapse onto himself. Nylon, who was swaying through the halls like a raving madman, is also crushed to death. Sapphire escapes the collapsing castle and stands triumphant in the sunlight. Tink has been mortally wounded by the castle's breakdown, and tells God that he is ready to sacrifice his life should Sapphire's parents be brought back from the dead. God then agrees to bring the King and Queen back to life, as Tink dies.

Sapphire and Franz end up getting married. Tink's spirit returns to heaven, where he has finally earned his wings.

== Production and style ==
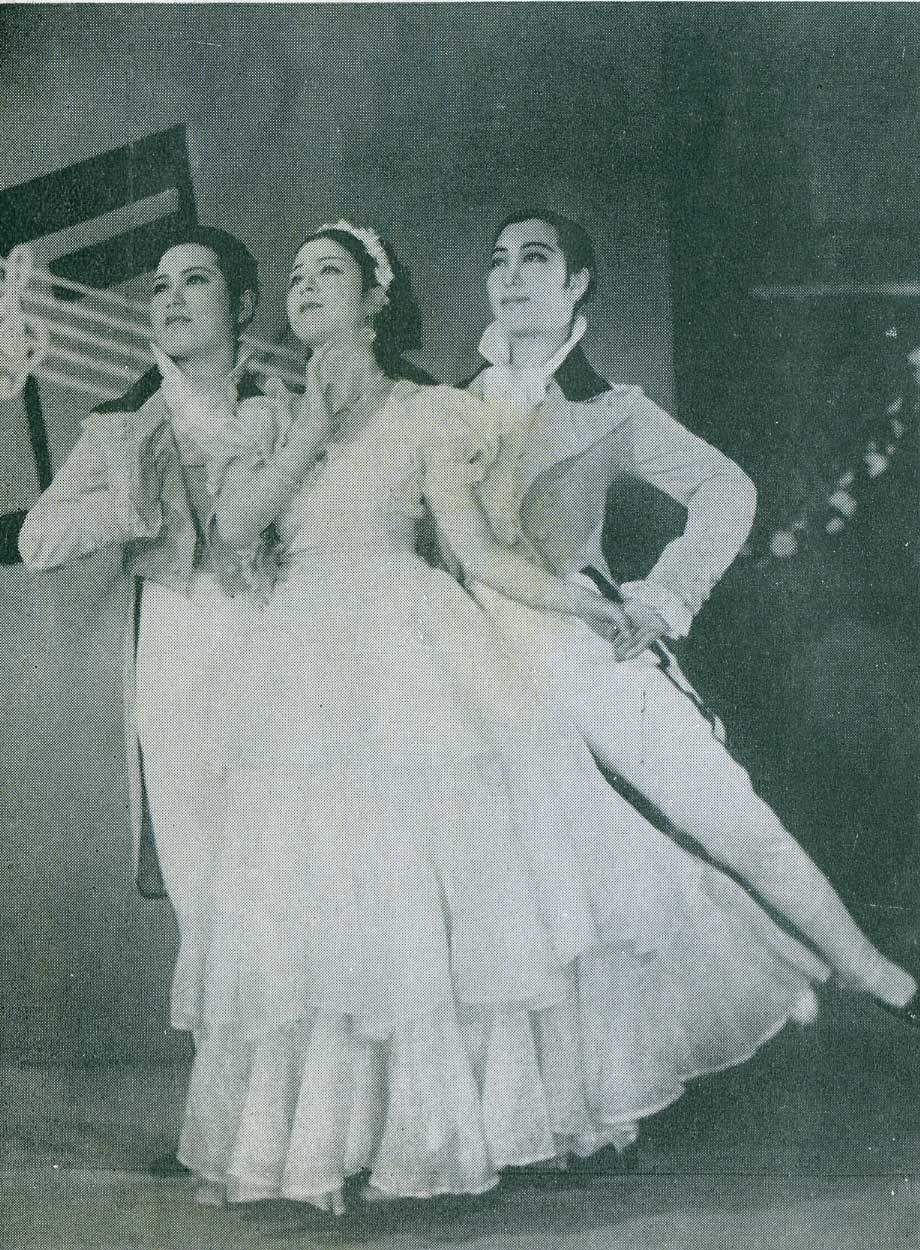
Takarazuka Revue's performances were Tezuka's main influence to create Princess Knight

During the 1950s, Osamu Tezuka was already popular having written Kimba the White Lion (1950) and Astro Boy (1952). In late 1952, a Shōjo Club's editor asked Tezuka if he would be able to create a work similar to his previous ones but aimed toward girls. Tezuka agreed and his first idea was to transpose the all-female musical theater group Takarazuka Revue into manga. Takarazuka's "aesthetic is on full display in Princess Knight", argued Natsu Onoda Power, in her book God of Comics.

Born in Osaka, Tezuka lived in Takarazuka City between five and twenty-four, and with a mother who was fan of the revue, he often watched its performances during his childhood and youthhood. Takarazuka's costumes, sets, and lyrics, as well as its gender representation and sexual politics were used by Tezuka on creating Princess Knight. Sapphire is based on the dansō no reijin ('beauty in male dress') of Takarazuka, and Franz is modeled after one of the main actresses, Yachiyo Kasugano. Nobuko Otowa as Puck in Takarazuka's version of A Midsummer Night's Dream influenced Tink's character.

Early Disney films' animation technique influenced Tezuka's art style, especially his way of drawing childlike features and eyes. The very large eyes were also inspired by Takarazuka's performances. The coloring and layout was influenced by the film The Tales of Hoffmann. Some aspects of Princess Knight are also reminiscent of his previous shōjo manga, Kiseki no Mori no Monogatari, which featured a feathered hat and men in white maillots as well as adventure-driven storylines. It was also influenced by Western literature, Christianity, Greek mythology, and European fairy tales—because of this it has been described as a "trippy pop culture pastiche". Reviewers have perceived influences from Cinderella, Fantasia's "Pastoral", Pinocchio, Sleeping Beauty, Snow White, Betty Boop, Captain Blood, Dracula, "Eros and Psyche", Hamlet, "The Sorcerer's Apprentice", Swan Lake, The Scarlet Pimpernel, and William Tell.

== Themes ==
Multiple critics have provided many possible interpretations on the presence of gender ambiguity and androgyny on Princess Knight. Patrick Drazen, author of the book Anime Explosion!, stated the androgyny in the series is "deceptive" as it addresses gender instead of sex, and more "specifically, gender-role expectations." "Tezuka's Gekiga: Behind the Mask of Manga"'s Philip Brophy summed up it as: "With its visualization of masculinity and femininity within one body it was able to depict conflicting selves within one-sexed body under pressure for social conformity, hence literally embodying the quest for identity and subjective agency". Ed Sizemore of Manga Worth Reading says Tezuka's central idea critiques "the false dichotomy that society creates among male and female." Rebecca Silverman of Anime News Network (ANN) and Sheena McNeil of Sequential Tart both wrote that Tezuka put feminist positionings on it (Note: Both Silverman and McNeil use as an example Sapphire's nurse saying "You, sir, are a terrible misogynist! The law stating a woman can't rule is ridiculous. I can't believe a learned man such as yourself would hold such prejudices." This is said when Sapphire's doctor and nurse have an argument over the policy that prohibits female rulers. Silverman dubbed it as one of the "feminist statements" of the manga, while McNeil called it "a feministic slap in the face right off the bat". The latter further argued that the nurse's indifferent reaction to their break up because of the fight makes her "all the more inspiring as a character, especially during this time period".) and Chris Mautner of The Comics Journal highlighted the presence of Friebe, "a swashbuckling" swordswoman, as another depiction of women in a non-subservient position (in contrast to the usual depiction).

At first glance, it appears Tezuka is asserting traditional gender roles. Looking more closely, we discover that Sapphire is not responding to which heart is more dominant. [...] Instead, Sapphire is acting as the people around her perceive her. If she is seen as a boy, then she is able to be strong and fierce. If she is seen as a girl, then she is frail and submissive. Tezuka is critiquing the false dichotomy that society creates among male and female. Sapphire needs to learn to be true to herself and not let others dictate who she is or what she can do.

— Ed Sizemore of Manga Worth Reading

On the other hand, Silverman affirmed it shows gender stereotypes and "some of the more misogynist ideals of 1960s Japan," as exemplified by the fact her boy's heart gives her physical strength. Mautner also found "some" sexism in the work, given as an example the fact she loses her swordsmanship ability when she is without her boy's heart. Drazen and Mautner stressed that the manga had broken with some gender expectations but did not abandon them, as Sapphire marries Franz in the end. Power stated that by this attitude Sapphire shows "her true happiness comes from being in a traditional female role." For Paul Gravett, it demonstrated she "was no feminist rebel after all" and he wrote in Manga: Sixty Years of Japanese Comics that Tezuka "created an exquisite world of indecision." Power concluded that "The image of Sapphire must have sent complex, if not conflicting, messages" to readers. This conflicts led Brophy to say "It may be more accurate to depict her characterization as schizophrenic rather than androgynous". (Note: As an example, Brophy mentions "a scene wherein Sapphire, wearing a dress, is happily weaving a garland of flowers for her mother but then at nine o'clock must become a 'prince'. Although at first softly lamenting her incomplete wreath, Sapphire in her prince attire – with a male facial expression and using male speech – takes her sword and destroys the wreath without hesitation.")

Snow Wildsmith of ICv2 described the series as having "younger characters [who] do not want to stick to the roles their parents proscribed for them and most of the women are tired of being told that they are the lesser sex." Mautner wrote that "if there's a central theme in Princess Knight, however, it's not that of sex roles but of parental expectations and filial duty". Drazen also exposed that the series deals with "another classically Japanese pair of opposites: duty and desire." Drazen said "she doesn't resent her duty" of having to be a boy and have fun with it, but that "only in private does she live out her feminine desires." Mautner expressed a similar view, affirming that even if she likes to be a boy "possesses a strong desire to indulge her female side."

== Publication ==
There have been four manga serializations of Princess Knight in Japan. The first serialization ran from January 1953 to January 1956 in Kodansha's magazine Shōjo Club, and was followed by a three tankōbon volumes release between December 30, 1954, and June 25, 1958. It was followed by several reissues; two volumes were published on October 11, and November 13, 1979, under the Osamu Tezuka Manga Complete Works line; on April 17, 1995, under KC Grand Collection line, and on November 12, 1999, under Manga Bunko line. In 2004, Geneon Universal Entertainment released a kanzenban edition of the manga that was republished by Fukkan.com in 2012. It was also released in a three-volume Kanzen Fukkoku-ban (完全復刻版; lit. 'Full reprint') edition on January 13, 2009, followed by a "Special Box" on January 14, 2009, and in an Osamu Tezuka Bunko Complete Works edition on February 10, 2011.

The second serialization, a follow-up to the Shōjo Club version, ran in Nakayoshi from January 1958 to June 1958. The title was changed to The Twin Knights (双子の騎士, Futago no Kishi) for publication in book form, but the serialization's name was still Princess Knight. It was first compiled by Suzuka Shuppan and released in a single tankōbon on May 15, 1960, which was republished by Mushi Pro Shōji on July 15, 1971. Kodansha published it in different lines and formats; on July 28, 1978, under the Osamu Tezuka Manga Complete Works line; on June 4, 1995, under the KC Grand Collection line; on November 12, 1999, under the Manga Bunko line; and on May 12, 2010, under the Osamu Tezuka Bunko Complete Works line.

The third serialization was a rewriting of the Shōjo Club version and ran from January 1963 to October 1966 in Nakayoshi, and was originally published into five tankōbon volumes by Kodansha between August 15, 1964, and June 15, 1966. It was followed by several rereleases and reissues; three volumes were published by Shogakukan in pocketbook format between March 10, and May 10, 1969; three volumes were published between June 13, 1977, and January 11, 1978, under the Osamu Tezuka Manga Complete Works line by Kodansha; in June 1982 it was published by Holp Shuppan; on December 14, 1994, it was released under KC Grand Collection line; on October 9, 1999, under Manga Bunko Line; and on October 9, 2009, under the Osamu Tezuka Bunko Complete Works line. A Kanzen Fukkoku-ban edition, along with a "Special Box", was published on May 29, 2009.

The fourth serialization was a science fiction story originally written by Tezuka, with the drawings done by Kitano Hideaki. It was serialized in the magazine Shōjo Friend in 1967, concurrently with its broadcast on television as animation. Kodansha encapsulated its chapters into two volumes released on May 3, 1967, and June 3, 1967. A tie-in to the anime series, Tezuka himself admitted that it was "a commercial flop, an ill-conceived" version.

Six volumes of Nakayoshi's 1963 Princess Knight were released between May 18, and July 27, 2001, in the United States in a bilingual (English/Japanese) edition by Kodansha International. A preview of the 1953 manga was released in the July 2007 issue of Viz Media's magazine, Shojo Beat. (Note: Shojo Beat's third volume and seventh issue contained a 25-page excerpt of some chapters and a contextual essay.) At the 2011 San Diego Comic-Con, Vertical announced that it had licensed the 1963 version (Note: Specifically, Vertical translated the 1977 reprint published under the Complete Works Edition line.) for an English-language translation in North America. Vertical published it in two parts; the first on November 1, 2011, and the second on December 6, 2011. In the following year, Vertical licensed The Twin Knights, which was released on July 30, 2013. Both series were rereleased by Vertical in ebook format; first, The Twin Knights on July 22, 2015, and then both Princess Knight volumes on August 12, 2015.

== Anime adaptation ==
The Princess Knight anime series was produced by Mushi Production and had Osamu Tezuka as executive director, and Chikao Katsui and Kanji Akabori as chief directors. The series of 52 episodes was originally broadcast in Japan on Fuji TV from April 2, 1967, to April 7, 1968. In addition to the anime series, there is also 28-minute pilot film that was produced in November 1966 but was not broadcast on television. It was released as an extra when the series was released on LaserDisc in Japan. All episodes were released on LaserDisc by Pioneer on March 28, 1997. The episodes were also distributed in DVD format; Nippon Columbia released two box sets on December 21, 2001, and June 1, 2002. A single box set was released by Columbia on July 23, 2008, and another was released by Takarashijima on October 29, 2010. A "Best Selection" DVD series was first released by Columbia on September 25, 2003, and rereleased on July 23, 2008.

Mushi Production submitted the anime adaptation to NBC Enterprises that was declined because its executives felt the series theme could be interpreted as "sex switch." Animator Joe Oriolo, however, purchased the anime's distribution rights, and along with Burt Hecht dubbed its episodes into English. In 1972, after a limited release under the title Princess Knight, Oriolo and Hecht edited three episodes and made it into a film titled Choppy and the Princess that was licensed to independent television in the United States and was syndicated in the 1970s and 1980s. In October 2012, Nozomi Entertainment, a Right Stuf's publishing division, acquired its distribution's rights for North America. Featuring an English-language and a Spanish-language dub, it used the edited and cut version broadcast in the 1970s and 1980s. The first part was released on August 20, 2013, while the second one was published on October 22, 2013.

The show also aired in Australia in the 1970s, and was released on home media in Australia and the United Kingdom. Movie Makers released seven episodes under the title The Adventures of Choppy and the Princess and three individual episodes without the title. The distributor Tasley Leisures released six episodes under the title Choppy and the Princess, Adventures 1-6. The Starlite Group released seven The Adventures of Choppy and the Princess DVDs in the United Kingdom in 2006, with the film also being available from the same company. In August 2013, Hanabee Entertainment licensed the series for an Australian release; it was first released on DVD into two parts on September 18, and October 6, 2013, respectively, while a box set was released on September 6, 2014.

An anime film adaptation titled The Ribbon Hero was announced on April 23, 2026. Produced by Twin Engine, animated by Outline, and directed by Yuuki Igarashi in his feature directorial debut, the film was released on Netflix on August 8, 2026.

=== Theater ===
At various times in his career, Tezuka worked on short original animation films, or "theater anime", which included some of the Princess Knight story. Samples of this work were shown in the "300 Inch Theater", which was held at Tezuka Osamu World in the Kyoto Station Building from July 1999. In this film, the Phoenix (from the eponymous Tezuka manga) plays the role of storyteller, and introduces two pictures. The first part tells the story of Princess Knight, and the second part talks about Minamoto Yoshitsune, who made his mark in the history of Kyoto as a person who became entangled in a struggle by another's wicked design in spite of his desire for peace just like Sapphire.

== Reception ==
Widely considered a classic, Princess Knight was very popular with girls in Japan by the time of its original release. One of the author's most popular works in Japan, it has been labeled as "a fascinating piece of anime history ... that's withstood the test of time" by Bamboo Dong of ANN. In 2005, Japanese television network TV Asahi conducted a "Top 100" online web poll and nationwide survey; Princess Knight placed 74th in the online poll and 71st in the survey. In 2006, TV Asahi conducted another online poll for the top one hundred anime, and Princess Knight did not make the general list, but ranked 77th in the "Celebrity List". After Vertical's statement that it would publish Princess Knight, critics Chris Butcher and Deb Aoki deemed it as one of the most anticipated manga announced at Comic-Con. In the following year, it was considered one of the best new "kids/teen" manga by critics Carlo Santos and Shaenon Garrity at Comic-Con. Aoki, for About.com, selected it as the second best new shōjo manga released in 2011 after Sailor Moon, stating it "can seem a little dated and quaint compared to its contemporary counterparts, but it's no less charming and fun to read." Gravett included Princess Knight on his book 1001 Comics You Must Read Before You Die.

Its art has been well received by critics, including Sizemore, Joseph Luster of Otaku USA, Wildsmith, Chris Kirby of The Fandom Post, and by Mautner, who stated, "Visually, Knight is a stunning achievement." On the other hand, Carlo Santos and Silverman of ANN said its art style may not appeal to modern readers, with Silverman deeming it a great "deterrent". Kirby wrote that Princess Knight is "a pleasure to look at, fun to read, and a piece of entertainment that excels at entertaining more than anything." Sizemore praised it as it "constantly delivering thrills at each turn," contrasting to Wildsmith, who considered the episodic nature of the series "chaotic and unfocused". Although also commended the formula, Santos stated the story in overall "has its weaknesses" and "allows itself ... logical loopholes." Luster asserted initially it focused too much in gags which "could easily become a tiresome formula", but the action in late chapters overcomes it. Sizemore called it "fun" but "deeply flawed in its storytelling." Shaun A. Noordin of The Star asserted, "The memorable characters, adventure, drama and comedy (not to mention a framework for exploring issues such as feminism, gender equality and identity) are all there, but the barrage of story arcs made it difficult for us to be invested in the narrative."

== Legacy ==
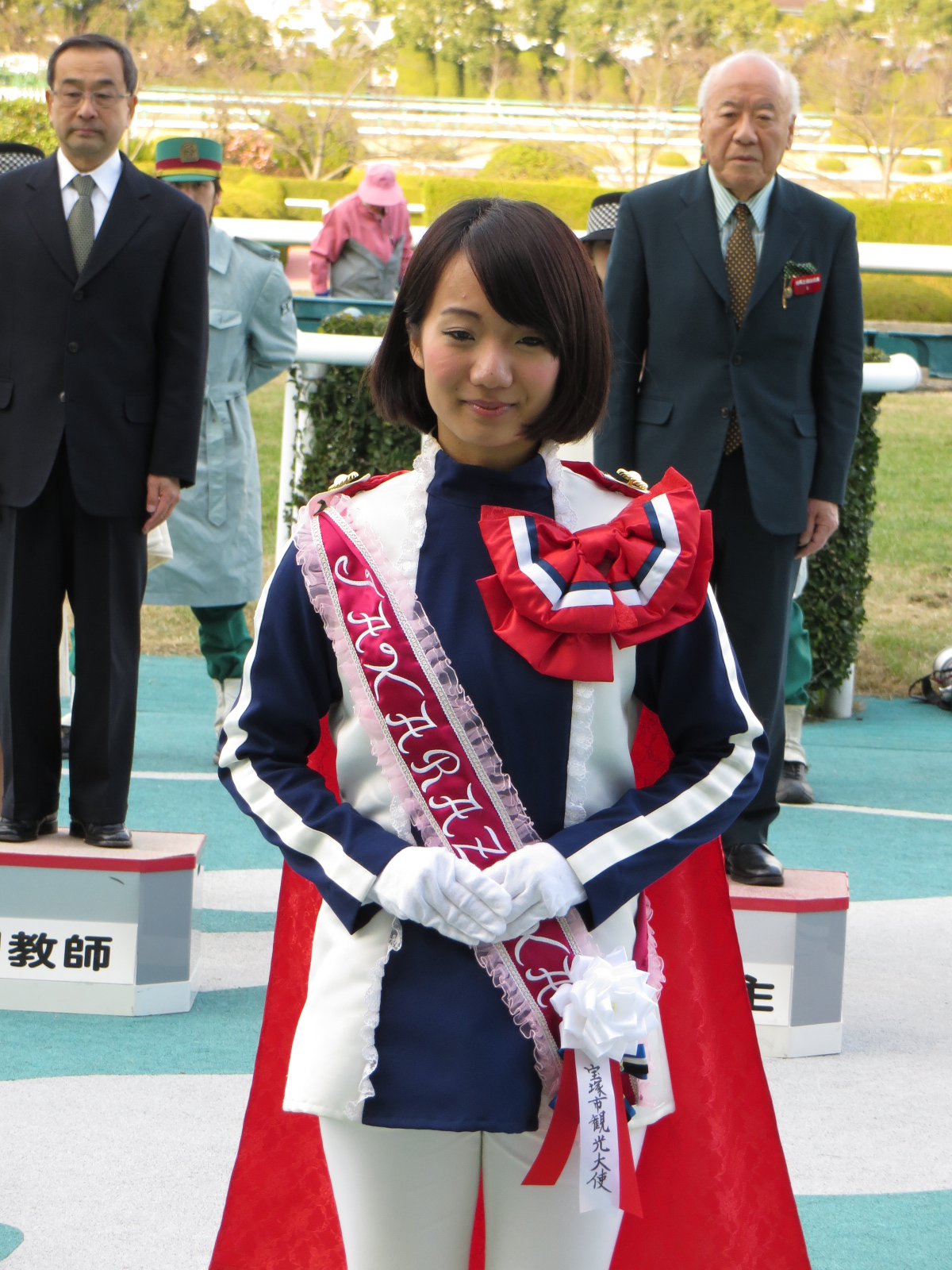
Sightseeing ambassador at Takarazuka, Hyōgo, wearing a Princess Knight costume, 2012.

=== Impacts on industry ===
Princess Knight marks the first time Tezuka used his "story comic" format—which uses a narrative structure and cinematic techniques—in a shōjo manga. The series changed the concept of shōjo manga from gag comics or strips teaching "good behavior" to narrative-focused works, and thus is considered the first modern work of the demographic. It also established elements that would be common in later works, including an idealized foreign (from a Japanese perspective) settings, a heroine with large eyes, and gender ambiguity with a certain amount of androgyny. In the 1970s, two trends were predominant in shōjo manga: the first featured "androgynous, masculine, or asexual protagonists searching for self and love" and the other had "more explicit romance involving an ordinary girl." Elements of both were already present in Tezuka's Sapphire.

The manga is considered to have started the genre of female superheroes, and regarded as a prototype for the magical girl genre. Martin Theron of ANN affirmed the series' "influence ... is immeasurable, and in a real sense every lead action heroine who has followed is a direct or indirect spiritual descendant of Princess Sapphire/Prince Knight." Indeed, Sapphire is one of the most recognizable heroines of Tezuka; between March 3–June 27, 2016, the Osamu Tezuka Manga Museum sponsored an art exhibit focused on the "Heroines of Osamu Tezuka," highlighting Sapphire and Pinoko of Black Jack. She was also considered the most iconic heroine in anime history by Thomas Zoth of Mania.com.

This work expanded the scope of Japanese popular culture by opening up the possibility of exploring a wider range of sexual orientations, which goes beyond clear gender binary homo- or heterosexuality. According to Brophy, "Shōjo manga's rich potential for complex representations of the human psyche in diverse sociocultural contexts was essentially constructed by Tezuka's androgynous character Sapphire." Featuring the first gender-ambiguous heroine, it influenced many works, specially shōjo manga, such as The Rose of Versailles, which possibilited Revolutionary Girl Utena, The Sword of Paros, and Sailor Moon's Sailor Uranus.

=== Remakes ===
A remake of the original Princess Knight manga called Sapphire: Princess Knight was written by Natsuko Takahashi and illustrated by Pink Hanamori. Serialized from the May 2008 issue to the July 2009 issue in Nakayoshi, it was compiled into four tankōbon between September 5, 2008, and September 4, 2009.

To commemorate the 60th anniversary of the series, a reboot version of Princess Knight started to be published on the online manga magazine Puratto Home by Home-sha in July 2013. Called Re:Born: Kamen no Otoko to Ribbon no Kishi (RE:BORN 仮面の男とリボンの騎士), it is a collaboration with Tezuka Productions and is illustrated by Shōko Fukaki with scenarios by Atsushi Kagurazaka. It lasted forty-one chapters, that were later released on three volumes, of which the first was released on July 25, 2014, along with a drama CD based on it, and the last was published on January 23, 2015.

=== Other adaptations ===
Because of the success of the first manga, a radio dramatization was created. A serial drama, the Princess Knight adaptation was broadcast on Radio Tokyo between April 4, 1955, and September 26, 1955. Almost thirty years later, a theater adaptation of the manga was created by the company Dengeki, running from July 5, 1984, to July 17, 1983. It played at Parco Space Part 3, was directed by Mitsumasa Shinozaki, written by Tsutomu Mukai, and starred Ran Ito. Another musical came in 1998; it was directed by Shunsaku Kawake, written by Kensuke Yokouchi, and starred Yoshihiko Inohara, Sae Isshiki and Ranran Suzuki. Yokouchi wrote another play and directed it himself; it was staged at Kanagawa Prefectural Youth Center in 2011, and starred Mikan Asakura. (Note: By the time of the production, "Mikan Asakura" was the actress' pseudonym, which later changed to "Nami" in 2013.) Yokouchi was also the screenwriter for two other stage adaptations in 2014 and 2016; both were directed by Masanari Ujigawa and staged at Rikkōkai Hall. The former starred Haruka Katayama and Aya Kamiki, while the latter featured Hirono Suzuki and Yui Itō.

In 2006, Princess Knight was adapted into a musical, Princess Knight: The Musical (リボンの騎士 ザ・ミュージカル, Ribbon no Kishi Za Myūjikaru), and performed in Japan by members of the popular idol groups Morning Musume and v-u-den with Ai Takahashi in the lead role. Directed by Shinji Ueda, with screenplay by Shinji Kimura and music by Masato Kai, it played at Shinjuku Koma Theater from August 1 to 27. The Up-Front Works record label Zetima released a music collection and a DVD of the musical on July 26, and November 29, 2006, respectively. Later, on December 25, its television broadcast was done by BS Japan.

In 2015, celebrating the 60th anniversary of Nakayoshi magazine, a musical directed by Yukio Ueshima, written by Sayaka Asai and with music composed by Shuhei Kamimura was staged. It starred Nogizaka46's Erika Ikuta and Reika Sakurai as Sapphire and Hecate respectively, while Keisuke Kaminaga and Tsunenori Aoki completed the main four in the poster, playing Prince Franz and the pirate Blood respectively. From November 12 to November 17, it ran at Tokyo's Akasaka ACT Theater and it was followed by exhibitions at Theater Brava in Osaka from December 3 to December 6.

== See also ==
- List of Osamu Tezuka anime
- List of Osamu Tezuka manga
- Osamu Tezuka's Star System

== Bibliography ==
- Drazen, Patrick (2002). Anime Explosion! – The What? Why? & Wow! of Japanese Animation. Stone Bridge Press. pp. 90–92. ISBN 978-1-880656-72-3.
- Johnson-Woods, Toni (2010). Manga: An Anthology of Global and Cultural Perspectives. Bloomsbury Publishing USA. ISBN 9781441107879.
- Ladd, Fred; Deneroff, Harvey (2008). Astro Boy and Anime Come to the Americas: An Insider's View of the Birth of a Pop Culture Phenomenon. McFarland & Company. p. 66–68. ISBN 9780786452576.
- Power, Natsu Onoda (2009). God of Comics: Osamu Tezuka and the Creation of Post-World War II Manga. University Press of Mississippi. p. 113–122. ISBN 9781604734782.
- Schodt, Frederik L. (1996). Dreamland Japan: Writings on Modern Manga. Stone Bridge Press. pp. 253–257. ISBN 9781880656235.
