= Odin: Photon Sailer Starlight =

- DVD cover
- Directed by: Toshio Masuda (chief); Takeshi Shirato
- Screenplay by: Eiichi Yamamoto; Toshio Masuda; Kazuo Kasahara
- Story by: Yoshinobu Nishizaki
- Produced by: Tomoharu Katsumata
- Cinematography: Shigeyoshi Ikeda
- Edited by: Yutaka Chikura
- Music by: Akira Takasaki; Fumitaka Anzai; Hiroshi Miyagawa; Kentarō Haneda; Masamichi Amano
- Production companies: Toei Animation; West Cape Corporation
- Distributed by: Toei Company
- Release date: August 10, 1985 (Japan)
- Running time: 139 minutes
- Country: Japan
- Language: Japanese

Odin: Photon Sailer Starlight (Japanese: オーディーン 光子帆船スターライト, Hepburn: Odin - Koshi Hansen Starlight), also known as Odin: Starlight Mutiny, is a 1985 Japanese science fiction anime film produced by Yoshinobu Nishizaki's West Cape Corporation which was previously known for Space Battleship Yamato (also known as Star Blazers). It was directed by Toshio Masuda with a music score by Hiroshi Miyagawa, both of whom worked on the Yamato series.

== Plot ==
Odin is set in the year 2099, which centers around the novice crew of the laser sailing space schooner Starlight as they embark on a historic interstellar test flight. They are intercepted by what seems to be a wrecked spaceship only to find that it contains a lone survivor; a young woman named Sara Cyanbaker. Unknown to the crew at this time, a mechanized space fleet approaches Earth and a scout vessel from that fleet was responsible for the destruction of Sara's ship.

Sara begins to have strange dreams about a place called Odin and a series of artifacts discovered on a lonely asteroid point to an ancient Norwegian mariner's folk song which mentioned the Norse god Odin. The crew decipher these artifacts and deduce that Odin may actually exist as a place, the paradise planet so often spoken of in mythology. The young crew is eager to make the journey but the captain and the ship's senior officers observe the need to follow the orders of Earth Command and return to Earth immediately. The crew mutinies and locks the senior officers in the officer's lounge and warp the ship to the location given in the artifacts. Upon arrival, the Starlight meet a cosmic being who appears before them in space. He identifies himself as Asgard and declares that he will block the gateway to paradise against corrupt beings of flesh and all other non-believers. As a result, the Starlight faces an almost endless swarm of mechanized attack ships. The Starlight crew successfully fights its way through to land on what appears to be a mechanized world only to face hordes of mechanized soldiers. Surviving the onslaught, Sara and the crew is horrified to learn that these soldiers are actually part living beings. A dying soldier hands a crew member a crystal memory chip and asks him to insert it into a computer display readout. Through it, the crew learn of the soldier's memories of Odin and the entire story of the alien people's exodus.

Legends once told of a paradise destroyed by a kingdom of fire.

Odin was once a planet that faced destruction by the radiation of its expanding sun, Canopus. Its people built giant computerized starships to monitor their exodus to find another world yet many stayed on Odin in the hopes that the fires of Canopus would die out. The computers on the ships ultimately developed sentience and transformed its humanoid refugees into cyborgs leaving those remaining on Odin the only ones who remained as themselves. The machines built larger machines to ensure that the mission succeeds resulting in an eventual corruption of the original purpose. Now these machines sought only to destroy all organic life. The dying soldier, noted that Sara not only looked like the queen of Odin's people, but that Sara was the queen's name. Sara confirms that there might be a connection as she recounts her own memories of The Tree of Life and how she was sheltered by two giants in her childhood. The cyborg soldier's dying words suggest that if Sara has these memories then Odin and its people may still live.

The crew promises to dedicate themselves to finding Odin. However, they must still defeat the master computer of this machine world; a being that calls itself Belgel. The crew finds a way to insert a computer virus which causes Belgel to overload and destroy the world-fortress. The movie ends simply with the Starlight crew pressing on, unhindered, to begin its search for the legendary planet Odin.

== Cast ==
- Keiko Han as Sara Cyanbaker
- Toshio Furukawa as Akira Tsukuba
- Gorō Naya as Shōnosuke Kuramoto / Narration
- Hideyuki Hori as Mamoru Nelson
- Katsuji Mori as Mitsuo Itami
- Kazuhiko Kishino as Thompson Tomonaga
- Kazuyuki Sogabe as Tōru Nara
- Noriaki Wakamoto as Naoki Ryūō
- Takeshi Katō as Takeshi Suzuka
- Tarō Ishida as Saint Asgard
- Tesshō Genda as Belgel
- Tōru Furuya as Jiro Ishige
- Yoku Shioya as Bōichi Nekota

== Reception ==
The movie came out in the popularity wake of Space Battleship Yamato, which had ended its run two years earlier with Final Yamato. Although sharing many similar directorial elements, it failed to gain any lasting popularity. The movie was also released in the U.S. by U.S. Manga Corps in both a dubbed format and an uncut subtitled format, of which it has the distinction of perhaps suffering the harshest editing for English release length. In contrast to the original uncut version, running 2 hours 15 minutes, the English dub runs only 90 minutes.

Despite attractive ship designs (most notably the Starlight) and beautiful animation, the film was panned by critics and mainstream fans alike as slow and plodding. Many criticize the movie's unresolved ending, as a trilogy was originally planned but canceled after underwhelming box office. It is also seen by many as Nishizaki's transparent attempt to recycle the themes in Yamato. The inclusion of music by the Japanese metal band Loudness, is both cheered and ridiculed.
