= Triton of the Sea =

Japanese manga series

- The cover for Triton of the Sea volume 1 from the Osamu Tezuka Manga Complete Works edition.

海のトリトン (Umi no Toriton)
- Genre: Adventure
- Manga
- Written by: Osamu Tezuka
- Published by: Kodansha
- Magazine: Sankei Shimbun
- Original run: September 1, 1969 – December 31, 1971
- Volumes: 4
- Anime television series
- Directed by: Yoshiyuki Tomino
- Produced by: Yoshinobu Nishizaki
- Written by: Yoshiyuki Tomino
- Studio: Animation Staff Room
- Original network: ABC
- Original run: April 1, 1972 – September 30, 1972
- Episodes: 27
- Anime film
- Directed by: Kazunori Tanahashi
- Produced by: Yoshinobu Nishizaki
- Studio: Academy Productions
- Released: July 14, 1979
- Runtime: 74 minutes

Triton of the Sea (海のトリトン, Umi no Toriton) is a 1969 Japanese manga series created by Osamu Tezuka for Kodansha. The manga was adapted by the Asahi Broadcasting Corporation into a 27-episode anime television series from April 1 to September 30, 1972, directed by Yoshiyuki Tomino (in his directorial debut). Digital Manga successfully crowd-funded the U.S. release of the manga on Kickstarter in 2012.

== Plot ==
5000 years ago, the Triton clan lived in Atlantis until the Poseidon clan destroyed them all out of envy, leaving Triton the last survivor of his kind. The white dolphin Ruka took the orphaned Triton to the caves in coastal Japan to protect him from his enemies.

Triton was taken in as a baby by the human boy, Kazuya Yasaki (矢崎和也). But Poseidon set off a huge tsunami that destroyed Kazuya's village and killed his father. Kazuya, his mother and Triton then moved to Tokyo, but Kazuya was cheated out of his salary and in his anger committed murder. He becomes a fugitive and works on a ship that, unbeknown to Kazuya, delivers goods to Poseidon's base.

As he grows older, Triton returns to the sea to take revenge on the Poseidon family. With his dolphin friends Ruka, Uru, Karu and Fin, he proceeds on a one-man war against the Poseidon family. During his journey, Triton meets Pipiko, the last surviving mermaid. Together, they work to stop Poseidon and his evil minions and get vengeance for their family. Triton kills all of Poseidon's 33 children one after another. Then he decides to go inside Poseidon's marine base to try to kill him. Supported by the human slaves working at the base, they almost succeeded, only to be betrayed by one of the slaves.

During his battle with one of Poseidon's sons, Triton came to know Ganomosu, the big turtle who has lived for many years at sea and is very wise. Ganomosu advised Triton to live on a floating island which is his granddad's shell and is surrounded by seven whirlpools.

Poseidon, who just managed to have another son with a sponge disguised as Pipiko, is unable to control this son, who is destroying everything in the sea. Triton and Poseidon came to a truce with turtle Ganomosu as witness, in which Triton will try to kill this monster provided Poseidon will not disturb the mermen and mermaids' peace anymore. Triton kills the monster by trapping it under the sun on dry land.

Pipiko and Triton marry and Pipiko lays seven eggs. Three months later, two boys and five girls emerge. They are named after the colours of the rainbow: Blue Triton, Green Triton, Indigo Triton, Yellow Triton, Orange Triton, Red Triton, Violet Triton.

Triton takes the children on an educational cruise around the seas on a yacht. It hits a storm and Green Triton is taken by humans. Triton goes on land to find her and he is drugged while Green Triton is taken to Tokyo. Triton and Blue Triton go to Tokyo to get Green back but the two are separated due to heavily polluted water. Triton, though, is met by Poseidon's general and is shown a piece of fake newspaper stating that Green Triton is dead.

Blue Triton, with the help of humans, finds and is re-united with Green Triton. Meanwhile, Triton, out of anger, triggered huge tsunamis to hit Tokyo at Poseidon's suggestion. Poseidon's general then advises the Tokyo media that the tsunamis are set off by Triton.

Triton finds Blue and Green Triton and realizes that he has been framed. As he tries to take his children back to sea he is shot. Kazuya and his friends finds Triton and together they exposes Poseidon's plan to frame Triton.

Triton goes after Poseidon to end the matter once and for all. Beforehand he asks Blue Triton to lead the mermen family in his absence. Triton then goes to Ganomosu, the huge turtle, and the two go to Poseidon's base for a final battle. The battle ended with a huge explosion at the base, killing everyone except Ganomosu.

Humans continue to hunt for mermaids and are led to the mermaid family's floating island by dolphins. Blue Triton then asks all the dolphins to push the island towards the human boat. They succeeded: The island crashes into the boat and both sink. The mermaid hunter dies during the crash. Blue Triton then meets Kazuya. He tells him that Triton is dead, and it is better for humans and mermen to stay away from each other.

Pipiko leads her children to meet Ganomosu, who is about to die. Ganomosu says he will provide himself as a sanctuary for her and her family out of his friendship with Triton. The mermen and mermaids from then on live on Ganomosu Island.

== Cast ==
- Triton: Yoku Shioya
- Pippy as "Pipiko": A mermaid who survived the genocide of the Triton family and who goes on to marry Triton. She bears him seven children. Akemi Hirokawa
- Heptaboda: Taeko Nakanishi
- Triton's Father: Keiichi Noda
- Triton's Mother: Toshiko Sawada
- Ruka: Haruko Kitahama
- Uru: Hiroshi Ōtake
- Karu: Kaneta Kimotsuki
- Fin: A sleepy-eyed dolphin friend of Triton's. Kazuko Sugiyama
- Proteus: Junpei Takiguchi
- Marcus: Kōji Yada
- Kazuya: A boy who takes in Triton and raises him from when he was a baby. For the first part of the story, the action centers around Kazuya before shifting gears to Triton.
- Ippei: Jouji Yanami
- Ganomoth:
- Medon: Ryusuke Shiomi
- Doriate: Hiroshi Masuoka
- Minotus: Hidekatsu Shibata
- Poseidon: The current ruler of the sea and leader of the Poseidon family. He intends to exterminate Triton and end the Triton family forever. Takeshi Watabe
- God of Poseidon: Yonehiko Kitagawa

== Blue Triton and Triton of the Sea ==
When the manga was originally serialized one page at a time in the Sankei Shinbun, it was called Blue Triton (青いトリトン, Aoi Toriton). The name was changed later when the anime series began on television, and then it became Triton of the Sea (海のトリトン, Umi no Toriton).

== See also ==
- List of Osamu Tezuka anime
- List of Osamu Tezuka manga
- Osamu Tezuka
- Osamu Tezuka's Star System
