= Space Carrier Blue Noah =

Japanese anime television series

- Space Carrier Blue Noah OP theme single

宇宙空母ブルーノア (Uchū Kūbo Burū Noa)
- Genre: Drama, Science fiction
- Anime television series
- Directed by: Kazunori Tanahashi
- Produced by: Takashi Iijima
- Written by: Seiji Matsuoka
- Music by: Hiroshi Miyagawa
- Studio: Academy Productions (Note: The studio went through numerous name changes, which are listed as follows for the sake of consistency with other articles listing the studio: Animation Staff Room (1972–1973); Academy Productions (1973–1980); Tokyo Animation (1980–1982); and West Cape Corporation (1982–1997).)
- Original network: NNS (YTV)
- English network: CA: CKVR-TV
- Original run: October 13, 1979 – March 30, 1980
- Episodes: 24

Space Carrier Blue Noah (Japanese: 宇宙空母ブルーノア, Hepburn: Uchū Kūbo Burū Noa) is a Japanese science fiction anime series produced by Academy Productions, which aired from October 13, 1979, to March 30, 1980. It was later dubbed in English as Thundersub and released in Spanish-speaking countries as Nave Anti-Espacial.

Set in 2052, the series follows Earth's battle for survival after an alien force known as the Death Force begins terraforming the planet. A group of students and survivors discover Blue Noah, a secret warship capable of space and underwater combat, and lead the fight to repel the invasion.

== Plot ==
In the year 2052, the planet Gotham faced annihilation as a roving black hole threatened to consume its sun and solar system. When all efforts to avert the disaster failed, a brilliant but authoritarian scientist, Leader Zytel (General Zee), revealed the Terror Star—a colossal spacefaring satellite capable of sustaining 200 million Gothamites. Granted absolute power to carry out the evacuation, Zytel led the survivors on a desperate search for a new home across deep space.

After thirty years of wandering, the Terror Star encountered Earth. Though not ideal for Gothamite physiology, the planet could be terraformed. Zytel dispatched disguised probes to assess its suitability. Earth's scientists, upon examining the unusual meteorites, uncovered evidence of intelligent alien surveillance. The nine global research centers, N1 to N9, coordinated to respond, gathering their top minds. Dr. Cromwell Collins, head of an oceanographic center affiliated with N1, warned his son Colin of the looming danger. Before being killed in a surprise Gothamite attack, he entrusted Colin with a glowing pendant and the word "Thundersub," urging him to reach N1.

As Earth's research centers and cities were devastated—only N1 and N9 surviving—Colin and his high school friends fled toward N1. Along the way, they found a mute girl, Anna, in shock from the invasion. At N1, while swimming near the bay, the group was pulled into a whirlpool that led to a hidden cave beneath the facility. There, Colin's pendant revealed a sealed chamber containing Blue Noah (Thundersub), a powerful, secret warship. When Colin spoke its name, the ship activated and surfaced.

Soon after, the returning test sub Tempest Jr.—piloted by Captain Noah and his crew—found Blue Noah. The Captain recognized the teens and learned Colin's father had designed the ship. He was also shocked to find Anna, his estranged daughter, aboard. She had believed he had abandoned her and her mother for duty. Despite tensions, the youths were welcomed aboard and assigned to the Tempest Jr..

As Terror Star entered Earth's orbit, its tidal effects triggered massive quakes, volcanic eruptions, and storms—killing 90% of the human population in a single day. Gothamite forces established sea fortresses to extract heavy water from the oceans, their primary energy source. Blue Noah began counterattacking and rescuing survivors, earning the attention and enmity of the Gothamite military arm, the Death Force, led by Col. Jrgens (Lupus).

The crew rescued Lt. Domingo from a downed fighter; he revealed that Blue Noah could be converted for space flight at N9 with an Aero Conversion Engine. En route to Bermuda, the team discovered that the Gothamites were building Gravity Control bases at both poles to make Earth hospitable for themselves—and deadly for humans. Blue Noah successfully destroyed the South Pole base, but Tempest Jr. failed to destroy the North Pole site and was nearly lost, with Skipper Bergen sacrificing himself to save his crew.

After regrouping, the fleet reached N9, where Blue Noah was upgraded and joined by three companion ships. With space combat capability, they launched simultaneous strikes, destroying the Gravity Control base in the North Pole and the Death Force's Earth headquarters in the Sahara, the latter by Lt. Domingo, who gave his life in the mission.

In space, Blue Noah confronted Terror Star. Hegeler, a Gothamite officer, discovered that most of the satellite's population had already perished due to a design flaw in its life support systems. Zytel planned to hide this truth by terraforming Earth and repopulating it with digital backups of Gothamite minds. When Hegeler confronted him, Zytel denied everything; a struggle ensued and Hegeler fatally stabbed him.

Meanwhile, Col. Jrgens engaged Blue Noah in a final duel and was killed. Captain Noah was mortally wounded during the battle and passed command to Colin before dying. When Terror Star's engines failed and sent it on a collision course with Earth, Hegeler forced a last-ditch engine restart. The satellite veered away just in time, realigning Earth's axis, but the stress caused Terror Star's systems to overheat and explode, sending it into the Sun.

With the Gothamite threat extinguished, Earth began to recover. Captain Noah was buried with honor, his epitaph reading "The man who saved Earth." Colin and Anna later married and founded an organization dedicated to preventing future extraterrestrial invasions.

== Voice cast ==
- Shin Kusaka: Tōru Furuya
- Kei Domon: Chiyoko Kawashima
- Ei Domon (Captain of the Blue Noah): Hidekatsu Shibata
- Chūji Shimizu (Chief Petty Officer, Captain of the Shīra) and Gulf (Godom's Governor-general on the Earth): Masatō Ibu
- Jürgens: Makio Inoue
- Leader Zytel and Domenico: Toshio Furukawa
- Hegeler (Godom's 2nd Governor-general on the Earth) and Seiji Matsukura: Masaharu Satō
- Sol-Gel and Jacopetti (Chief Cook): Kōji Yada
- Shō Hidaka: Ichiro Mizuki
- Hiroshi Izumi (Steerman of the Shīra): Akira Murayama
- Michirō Tamura and Taku Nakahira (Chief Officer of Intelligence and Communications): Shigeru Chiba
- Tatsuya Inoue: Hidemitsu Hori
- Katsuhiko Miyoshi and Kazuomi Hiraga (Chief Officer of Science and Technology): Kan Tokumaru
- Kenta Kōchiyama and Bunzō Shimanuki (Chief Engineer): Hiroshi Ōtake
- Dr. Sayoko Sakuramachi (Surgeon): Keiko Yamamoto
- President of the Earth Federation: Kunihiko Kitagawa
- Dr. Kenjirō Kusaka: Kōhei Miyauchi
- Iwase: Kōji Totani
- Kapira:
- Tara: Kazuko Matsuzawa
- Farrah Arnoul: Yumi Nakatani
- Narrator: Ryō Ishihara

== Production staff ==
- Planning and Original Design: Yoshinobu Nishizaki
- Producer: Takashi Iijima
- Director: Kazunori Tanahashi
- Script: Hideaki Yamamoto, Seiji Matsuoka, Takashi Yamada
- Storyboard General Director: Kenzō Koizumi
- Storyboard Director: Yoshiyuki Hane
- Production Director: Kazunori Tanahashi
- Character Design: Yoshiyuki Hane
- Mechanical Design: Yūji Kaida, Takayuki Masuo
- Special Effects Supervisor: Ryūichi Kaneko
- Music(compose): Masaaki Hirao, Hiroshi Miyagawa
- Music(arrangement): Motoki Funayama
- Theme Song: Space Carrier Blue Noah: Toward the Great Ocean
  - Lyrics: Michio Yamagami
  - Compose: Masaaki Hirao
  - Arrangement: Motoki Funayama
  - Vocals: Mayo Kawasaki
- Ending Theme: Night Cruise
  - Lyrics: Michio Yamagami
  - Compose: Masaaki Hirao
  - Arrangement: Motoki Funayama
  - Vocals: Mayo Kawasaki

== Episode list ==
Following is a list of all 24 episode titles, with an English translation first, followed by the original Japanese (and a rōmaji transliteration in parentheses).

1. (2-hour special) Birth of the Young Lions
  若き獅子たちの誕生
  (Wakaki Shishi-tachi no Tanjō)
2. The Blue Noah Descends South
  ブルーノア南下す
  (Burū Noa Nanka su)
3. Coral Reef Rescue Mission
  サンゴ礁救出作戦
  (Sangoshō Kyūshutsu Sakusen)
4. The Secret of Gotham Base
  ゴドム基地の秘密
  (Godomu Kichi no Himitsu)
5. Gotham's Terraforming Plan
  ゴドムの地球改造計画
  (Godomu no Chikyū Kaizō Keikaku)
6. Adam and Eve of the South Seas
  南海のアダムとイブ
  (Nankai no Adamu to Ibu)
7. Burning Southern Cross
  燃える南十字星
  (Moeru Minami Jūjisei)
8. Attack That Tower!
  あの塔を撃て!
  (Ano Tō wo Ute!)
9. Hurricane of Love and Anger
  愛と怒りのハリケーン
  (Ai to Ikari no Harikēn)
10. Detour of Decision
  決断のまわり道
  (Ketsudan no Mawari-michi)
11. Vow to Tomorrow
  あしたへの誓い
  (Ashita e no Chikai)
12. Sarah, Her Love
  ファラ、その愛
  (Fara, Sono Ai)
13. Crimson Tide Hell of Fear
  恐怖の赤潮地獄
  (Kyōfu no Akashio Jigoku)
14. Thrilling! The Dummy Strategy
  痛快! ダミー作戦
  (Tsūkai! Damī Sakusen)
15. First Report from Bermuda
  バミューダからの第一報
  (Bamyūda kara no Dai Ippō)
16. Heroic! Rush into the Arctic Ocean
  壮烈! 北極海突入
  (Sōretsu! Hokkyoku-kai Totsunyū)
17. Showdown in the Abyss
  深海の一騎打ち
  (Shinkai no Ikkiuchi)
18. The American Channel Breakthrough Strategy
  アメリカ海峡突破作戦
  (Amerika Kaikyō Toppa Sakusen)
19. Amazon Surprise Strategy
  アマゾン奇襲作戦
  (Amazon Kishū Sakusen)
20. 48 Hours in Bermuda
  バミューダ48時間
  (Bamyūda 48jikan)
21. Now, to Space
  いざ、宇宙へ
  (Iza, Uchū e)
22. Gotham's True Colors
  ゴドムの正体
  (Godomu no Shōtai)
23. Gotham, Where To Go?!
  ゴドムよ、何処へ?!
  (Godomu yo, Izuko e?!)
24. Earth, Forever!
  地球よ、永遠に!
  (Chikyū yo, Eien ni!)

The first episode was originally broadcast as a feature-length "TV special" to introduce the series, later split into four 30-minute episodes for rebroadcast by Japanese local TV stations:

1. 1-1.Wanderer of the Cosmos
  大宇宙の放浪者
  (Dai-uchū no Hōrōsha)
2. 1–2.The Hope of the Earth Is This!!
  地球の希望はこれだ!!
  (Chikyū no Kibō wa Kore da!!)
3. 1–3.A Big Crisis! Blue Noah
  大危機!ブルーノア
  (Dai Kiki! Burū Noa)
4. 1–4.Fire the Anti-proton Gun!
  反陽子砲 発射!
  (Han-yōshi-hō Hassha!)

== TV ==
- The complete series was aired dubbed in English on CKVR-TV and CFPL-TV in Canada, RPN-9 and IBC-13 in the Philippines (1983–84), NTA in Nigeria, StarPlus in India and on the NBC Super Channel in Europe (early 1990s?).

== Blue Noah specifications ==
- Standard Displacement: 170,000 standard tons
- Classification: Super Submarine Aircraft Carrier
- Fighter Capacity: 150

Closing the starboard and port flight decks makes it possible for the Blue Noah to submerge for underwater cruising. It is equipped with a lightwave booster, making both atmospheric and extra-atmospheric operation possible. The Tempest Junior mini-submersible is housed in the bow of the ship, large Bison attack helicopter known as "Rocketcopter" is stowed in the stern and the lower decks serve as a hangar for numerous fighter jets. The Tempest Junior features an anti-gravity drive allowing the crew to detach from the main ship for "away missions."

Blue Noah's most powerful weapon is the Anti-Proton Gun. When initiated, the prow of the ship separates into upper and lower halves, revealing a massive energy generator. Electrical power from all of the ship's onboard systems is diverted to power this generator, creating a massive burst of energy powerful enough to annihilate a target completely. This enormous energy requirement renders Blue Noah's systems temporarily offline after a single burst of the Anti-Proton Gun, and as such the weapon is used only as a last resort during Earth sorties. Extensive modifications are made to the Blue Noah prior to the final assault on the alien invaders, enabling the ship to use the Anti-Proton Gun repeatedly in space without the resulting system downtime.

== Other appearances ==
The 2009 anime film Space Battleship Yamato: Resurrection has an appearance by a ship called the Blue Noah, the flagship of Earth's immigration fleet. There are no indications that the events of both anime are connected.

== See also ==
- Space battleship
- Space Battleship Yamato: Resurrection
