= Yoshinobu Nishizaki =

Japanese anime producer (1934–2010)

Yoshinobu Nishizaki 西﨑義展
- Born: Hirofumi Nishizaki (西崎弘文, Nishizaki Hirofumi); 18 December 1934; Tokyo City, Tokyo Prefecture, Japan
- Died: 7 November 2010 (aged 75); Chichi-jima, Ogasawara, Tokyo, Japan
- Occupations: Anime producer, director, writer
- Notable work: Space Battleship Yamato series

Yoshinobu Nishizaki (西崎 義展, Nishizaki Yoshinobu; 18 December 1934 – 7 November 2010) was a Japanese film producer best known as one of the two co-creators of the anime series Space Battleship Yamato. He was sometimes credited as Yoshinori Nishizaki. He was born in 1934 and graduated from the Nihon University Art Department. He also founded the studio Academy Productions which produced Space Battleship Yamato as well as the 1980 anime series; Space Emperor God Sigma for Toei Company.

== Life and work ==
Office Academy
- Native name: オフィス • アカデミー株式会社
- Founded: 1963; 63 years ago (original); 1973; 53 years ago
- Founder: Yoshinobu Nishizaki
- Defunct: 1968; 58 years ago (original); 1982; 44 years ago
- Fate: Bankruptcy
- Successor: West Cape Corporation
- Key people: Yoshinobu Nishizaki
- Divisions: Tokyo Animation (1972–1982); Nishizaki Music Publishing (1977–1982)

West Cape Corporation
- Native name: ウェストケープ • コーポレション株式会社
- Predecessor: Office Academy
- Founded: July 1982; 44 years ago
- Founder: Yoshinobu Nishizaki
- Defunct: September 1997; 29 years ago
- Fate: Bankruptcy
- Successor: Enagio
- Key people: Yoshinobu Nishizaki; Eiichi Yamamoto
- Divisions: Japan Audivisual Network (1984–1991)

Nishizaki graduated in 1957 from Nippon University. His first love was music; he owned a jazz club and was also a jazz radio personality. He formed Office Academy in 1963 as a music production company. Nishizaki's entry into the anime world came in 1970 when he joined Osamu Tezuka's animation studio, Mushi Production, as a sales manager; his first job was to sell the studio's anime Marvelous Melmo to a TV broadcaster in Osaka. Nishizaki produced his first anime, Triton of the Sea, in 1972, and followed it up with the ambitious musical comedy Wansa-kun in 1973; both were based on Tezuka manga, but due to an apparent copyright mixup on Nishizaki's part, Tezuka lost the rights to the anime versions of both series, and Mushi Production made both shows without Tezuka's involvement. Both shows were also ratings disappointments.

After Mushi declared bankruptcy, Nishizaki hired Eiichi Yamamoto and his former staff from Mushi, restructured his old company Office Academy. Former Mushi Productions' branch studio Animation Staff Room (アニメーション・スタッフルーム, Animēshon Sutaffu Rūmu) was incorporated by Office Academy and rebranded as Academy Productions (アカデミー製作, Akademī Seisaku) (and rebranded again as Tokyo Animation in 1980). In 1974, Yoshinobu created the classic Space Battleship Yamato franchise alongside famous mangaka Leiji Matsumoto. At first its ratings were as disappointing as those of Nishizaki's previous ventures; however, the franchise exploded in popularity in 1977 with the release of a hugely successful movie-length edit of the TV series, and "Yamato Fever" continued unabated in Japan for the next six years. Slightly edited versions of the three Yamato TV series were also a cult success in the United States under the title Star Blazers. In 1982, Office Academy's subsidiaries, Tokyo Animation (東京動画, Tōkyō Dōga) and Nishizaki Music Publishing (西崎音楽出版, Nishizaki Ongaku Shuppan), were separated from the parent company and merged to form West Cape Corporation. In the same year, Office Academy ceased operations and transferred all of its intellectual property to the successor company.

Nishizaki's other works produced during and after Yamato's peak of popularity did not come close to matching the explosive popularity of Yamato, and during the 1990s, he began to fall into rough straits financially. His company, Japan Audiovisual Network (ジャパン・オーディオビジュアル・ネットワーク, Japan Ōdiobijuaru Nettowāku), founded in 1984, declared bankruptcy in 1991, and Nishizaki, as well as West Cape Corporation, declared bankruptcy in 1997 amidst his wrangling with co-creator Leiji Matsumoto over the copyrights to Yamato. In 1994, Nishizaki designed a short-lived follow-up series called Yamato 2520, and was later sued by Matsumoto for breach of copyright. The case over Yamato led to halting the production of the video series after only three episodes. The dispute was finally settled in 2003, with Nishizaki winning the use of the name Yamato and the original plot and characters but losing the use of the original conceptual art, ship and character designs to Matsumoto.

Nishizaki's anime film Space Battleship Yamato: Resurrection was released on December 12, 2009. There is also a live action film adaptation of the first TV series produced by Nishizaki which premiered in Japan during December 2010.

=== Anime produced by Nishizaki's companies ===
==== Television series and OVAs ====
Year	Title	Series director	Series composition	Character designer	Music composer	No. of episodes	Network
1972	Triton of the Sea	Yoshiyuki Tomino		Yukiyoshi Hane	Hiromasa Suzuki	27	ABC
1974	Space Battleship Yamato	Leiji Matsumoto	Yoshinobu Nishizaki	Nobuhiro Okasako	Hiroshi Miyagawa	26	NNS
1978	Space Battleship Yamato II	Noboru Ishiguro	Leiji Matsumoto	Kenzō Koizumi	Hiroshi Miyagawa	26	NNS
1979	Space Carrier Blue Noah	Kazunori Tanahashi	Seiji Matsuoka	Yukiyoshi Hane	Hiroshi Miyagawa	24	NNS
1980	Maeterlinck's Blue Bird: Tyltyl and Mytyl's Adventurous Journey	Hiroshi Sasagawa	Maru Tamura & Keisuke Fujikawa	Toyoo Ashida & Leiji Matsumoto	Hiroshi Miyagawa	26	FNS
1980	Space Emperor God Sigma (Note: Animation services. Produced by Toei Company.)	Takeyuki Kanda & Katsuhiko Taguchi	Katsuhiko Taguchi	Kazuhiko Udagawa & Kaoru Shintani	Hiroshi Tsutsui	50	TC12
1980	Space Battleship Yamato III	Eiichi Yamamoto		Kenzō Koizumi	Hiroshi Miyagawa	25	NNS
1981	Beast King Golion	Katsuhiko Taguchi	Susumu Takaku	Kazuo Nakamura	Masahisa Takeichi	52	TC12
1987	Urotsukidōji (Note: Produced only. Animation services were provided by Mu Animation Studio, Phoenix Entertainment and Studio Take-Off.)	Hideki Takayama & Yōsei Morino	Gorō Sanyō & Nobuaki Kishima	Various	Masamichi Amano	13	None (OVA)
1994	Yamato 2520 (Note: Produced only. Animation services were provided by Studio Take-Off.)	Takeshi Shirato	Yoshinobu Nishizaki	Toshiyuki Kubooka	David Matthews	3	None (OVA)

==== Feature films ====
Year	Title	Director	Story by	Screenplay by	Character designer	Music composer	Runtime
1977	Space Battleship Yamato	Toshio Masuda	Yoshinobu Nishizaki	Eiichi Yamamoto	Nobuhiro Okasako	Hiroshi Miyagawa	145 min
1978	Arrivederci Yamato	Toshio Masuda	Leiji Matsumoto	Keisuke Fujikawa	Kenzō Koizumi	Hiroshi Miyagawa	151 min
1979	Triton of the Sea	Kazunori Tanahashi	Osamu Tezuka	Seiji Matsuoka	Yukiyoshi Hane	Hiromasa Suzuki	74 min
1979	Yamato: The New Voyage	Yoshinobu Nishizaki	Leiji Matsumoto	Eiichi Yamamoto	Kenzō Koizumi	Hiroshi Miyagawa	95 min
1980	Be Forever Yamato	Tomoharu Katsumata	Leiji Matsumoto	Toshio Masuda	Kazuhiko Udagawa	Hiroshi Miyagawa	148 min
1983	Final Yamato	Takeshi Shirato	Eiichi Yamamoto	Kazuo Kasahara	Kazuhiko Udagawa	Kentarō Haneda	163 min
1985	Odin: Photon Sailer Starlight (Note: Co-produced with Toei Animation.)	Toshio Masuda	Yoshinobu Nishizaki	Eiichi Yamamoto & Kazuo Kasahara	Tomonori Kogawa & Shin'ya Takahashi	Various (Note: Hiroshi Miyagawa, Akira Takasaki, Kentarō Haneda, Fumitaka Anzai, and Masamichi Amano.)	139 min

== Legal troubles ==
On December 2, 1997, police stopped his car on the Tōmei Expressway in Shizuoka after he was driving suspiciously. He was arrested when police found inside his attache case 50g of stimulants, 7g of morphine, 9g of marijuana. While on bail he went to the Philippines on his English-registered cruiser the Ocean Nine; he returned to smuggle in an M16 with M203 grenade launcher, a Glock 17, and a large amount of ammunition. On January 21, 1999, Nishizaki was sentenced to two years and eight months in prison for the narcotics possession charge.

Later on February 1, 1999, he was arrested after a handgun, 131 bullets and 20 grams of stimulant drugs were seized from his house in Setagaya Ward, Tokyo. Nishizaki, voluntarily submitted two automatic rifles, 1,800 bullets, and 30 howitzer shells kept in a station wagon in his garage, police said. Police said that Nishizaki had hidden an Austrian handgun loaded with three bullets under a zaisu chair in a study. Nishizaki told police that he had bought the handgun in Hong Kong 10 years earlier. On February 20, 2003, he was sentenced to two years and eight months in prison for the possessing firearms charge. He was released from prison on December 9, 2007.

== Death ==
Nishizaki drowned on 7 November 2010 at Chichijima, Ogasawara, when he suffered an apparent heart attack after falling off the research steamboat Yamato.

== Filmography ==
- 1972: Triton of the Sea – Producer
- 1973: Little Wansa – Producer
- 1974: Space Battleship Yamato – Producer, original concept
- 1978: Arrivederci Yamato – Executive producer
- 1978: Space Battleship Yamato II – Executive producer
- 1979: Yamato: The New Voyage – Director, executive producer
- 1979: Space Carrier Blue Noah – Executive producer
- 1980: Maeterlinck's Blue Bird: Tyltyl and Mytyl's Adventurous Journey – Executive producer
- 1980: Space Emperor God Sigma – Executive producer
- 1980: Be Forever Yamato – Executive producer
- 1980: Space Battleship Yamato III – Executive producer
- 1981: Beast King GoLion – Executive producer
- 1983: Final Yamato – Executive producer
- 1985: Odin: Photon Sailer Starlight – Original concept, executive producer
- 1987: Urotsukidōji Series – Executive producer
- 1994: Yamato 2520 – Screenwriter, producer, episode director
- 2009: Yamato: Resurrection – Co-director, screenwriter, executive producer
