= Yan Wu Yi =

Yan Wu Yi may refer to following Japanese individuals whose name can be transliterated to Kanji pronounced by Hanyu Pinyin:

- 岩屋毅 (Yánwū Yì, 1957–), Japanese politician
- 塩屋翼 (Yánwū Yì, 1958–), Japanese actor and voice actor
