= Yamato 2520 =

Original video animation

- First volume LaserDisc cover

YAMATO2520 (Yamato Nī Gō Nī Zero)
- Created by: Yoshinobu Nishizaki
- Original video animation
- Directed by: Takeshi Shirato (1–3) (Note: Credited as Director (総監督) in episode 1, and as Chief Director (チーフ・ディレクター) in episode 2 and 3.); Yoshinobu Nishizaki (2); Shigenori Kageyama (3)
- Written by: Yoshinobu Nishizaki; Eiichi Yamamoto; Yasushi Hirano
- Music by: David Matthews
- Studio: West Cape (Note: Production and animation cooperation. Credited as Yamato Studio.) Studio Take-Off (Note: Animation studio.)
- Released: December 17, 1994 – August 25, 1996
- Runtime: 60 minutes each
- Episodes: 3 (+2 extra)

Yamato 2520 (YAMATO2520, Yamato Nī Gō Nī Zero) was Yoshinobu Nishizaki's attempt at a sequel to Space Battleship Yamato, set several hundred years after the original series. However, Nishizaki was sued by Leiji Matsumoto for breach of copyright. Ultimately, Yamato 2520 was left unfinished after only three episodes (of planned ten) were released. The episodes came out on VHS and LaserDisc for home media.

The OVA series features mechanical designs by Syd Mead and a soundtrack by jazz musician David Matthews.

== Cast ==
- Kazukiyo Nishikiori as Nabu Ancient
- Tomo Sakurai as Marcie Shima
- Yasunori Matsumoto as Aga Serene
- Ichirō Nagai as Tōgō Shima
- Yoko Asagami as Amethis
- Akira Kamiya as Rikiyard
- Chafūrin as Jog
- Isshin Chiba as Kemushi/Doc
- Shigeru Chiba as Speed
- Kenyū Horiuchi as Emilio
- Masatō Ibu as Blauné
- Kōji Ishii as Moai
- Hideyuki Umezu as Packard
- Ken Yamaguchi as Tonbe
- Konami Yoshida as Susha
- Hiro Yuuki as Konman
- Taichirō Hirokawa as Narrator
