= Yakuza Graveyard =

1976 film by Kinji Fukasaku

- Theatrical release poster
- Directed by: Kinji Fukasaku
- Written by: Kazuo Kasahara
- Starring: Tetsuya Watari
- Cinematography: Toru Nakajima
- Edited by: Isamu Ichida
- Music by: Toshiaki Tsushima
- Distributed by: Toei
- Release date: October 30, 1976
- Running time: 92 minutes
- Country: Japan
- Language: Japanese

Yakuza Graveyard, known in Japan as Yakuza no Hakaba: Kuchinashi no Hana (やくざの墓場 くちなしの花; "Yakuza Burial: Jasmine Flower"), is a 1976 Japanese yakuza film directed by Kinji Fukasaku. The screenplay by Kazuo Kasahara is based on a concept by Norimichi Matsudaira, Naoyuki Sugimoto and Kyo Namura.

Complex named it number 17 on their list of The 25 Best Yakuza Movies. Kino International released the film on DVD in North America in 2006.

== Plot ==
Kuroiwa, a police investigator born in Manchukuo, is cracking down on yakuza business but his rough methods often get him in trouble with his superiors and he is transferred to a new beat in Osaka. Kuroiwa is sleeping with the widow of a man he killed and she demands that he give her enough money to open up her own bar. When Kuroiwa humiliates and beats a group of young yakuza from the Nishida family, the Nishida family offers him money to be on their side in a turf war against the Yamashiro family, but he refuses. The Nishida family tells underboss Matsunaga's half-Korean wife Keiko to convince Kuroiwa to take their side. Meanwhile, Kuroiwa pressures the young yakuza members he had beaten into helping him arrest other criminals. He visits a gambling house to try to win the money he needs for his girlfriend and one of the young Nishida yakuza sees a Yamashiro yakuza in illegal possession of a weapon and follows him to tell Kuroiwa where he went. Kuroiwa arrives and discovers a group of former police officers now working with the Yamashiro family under the leadership of Police Vice President Teramitsu. Teramitsu offers him money but Kuroiwa burns it in disgust. Kanai of the Yamashiro family confronts the Nishida yakuza about planting a cop in their gambling house and a shootout erupts.

Keiko gives Kuroiwa the money he needs for his girlfriend and asks him to accompany her to Tottori, where her husband is imprisoned on a 15-year sentence. When she suggests to him that Ezaki should become the leader, he erupts in anger and tells her that she should have hung herself when he was condemned. Distraught, she attempts to throw herself into the ocean but is saved by Kuroiwa. The police make plans to gather dirt on the Nishida bosses in order to take down the family, but when Kuroiwa suggests going after the Yamashiro family as well they tell him to follow orders. Lieutenant Hidaka, Kuroiwa's old friend from the police academy, is assigned to the Nishida task force and tells Kuroiwa that Internal Affairs and his boss know that he is sleeping with the widow of the man he killed. The widow uses the money from Kuroiwa as a partial down payment on a bar.

Kuroiwa is invited to a pledge of brotherhood ceremony between the Yushin group and the Nishida family, where Iwata Goro is announced as new acting boss of the family on behalf of the boss Sugi. When Iwata stops Kuroiwa from touching Keiko, a large brawl erupts. Iwata later visits Kuroiwa with alcohol and foreign prostitutes and asks for his help with a gambler who ran out on a 30-million-yen debt. Kuroiwa learns that the debtor was forced to sell his Quonset huts to the Crime Prevention Association, which had signed a contract for 50 million, but one of the patrons was Kusumoto, a Yamashiro man who forcibly took 30 million as a fee to settle the debt with the Nishida family but never brought the money to Iwata. Kuroiwa also finds that the association is run by Sanko enterprises, a legit front for the Yamashiro family, so he suggests that Chief Akama could investigate Kusumoto to squeeze him on charges of extortion or fraud and get him to return the huts so that the debtor could sell them and get the money to pay Iwata. Iwata apologizes for the fight and says he will tell Matsunaga to divorce Keiko. Iwata confesses that he is full-blooded Korean and the two pledge brotherhood. Kusumoto is brought in and beaten for information, but Kuroiwa is relieved of duty and brought up on charges of soliciting foreign prostitutes, blackmailing the owner of a mahjong parlor under the name of the Nishida family, and using the Sanno police to drag a suspect into custody. They also accuse him of pledging brotherhood with a yakuza and sleeping with the mistress of the yakuza he killed.

A series of violent attacks are exchanged between the two families and eventually the riot police are called in to guard the leaders and headquarters of each organization and set up roadblocks. Hidaka tails Kuroiwa and finds where Iwata is hiding while recovering from a bullet wound in his leg, but Kuroiwa beats him to prevent him from calling in to the station. The police threaten Sugi with charges for instigating a riot but he makes a deal and agrees to make peace with the Yamashiro family once the Acting Boss Iwata is taken out. Kuroiwa taps Teramitsu's phone and overhears details about the deal but he is discovered and injected with what they call a truth serum used by the nazis and he tells them the location of Iwata's hideout. The police arrest Iwata and set him up with an easy escape opportunity to enable them to kill him and claim that it was due to falling during the escape. Sugi tells his men not to fight the Yamashiro family anymore and kicks out a remorseful Kuroiwa. Keiko injects him with heroin to make him settle down, then points a gun at him and accuses him of betraying her and Iwata but the bullet only hits him in the arm. She shoots up the rest of the heroin herself, explaining that she started shooting up when she was a 13-year-old hooker and that she does not belong to anyone. Kuroiwa claims her as his own and insists that he never betrayed her. To prove it, he marches into the police station and interrupts a meeting between the police and the Nishida family, which is agreeing to voluntarily disband, and tells Hidaka to arrest Teramitsu and the chief. They dismiss him as a drug addict so he shoots and kills Teramitsu. As Kuroiwa is walking toward Keiko's car, Hidaka runs out and shoots him dead.

== Cast ==
- Tetsuya Watari as Kuroiwa Ryu
- Meiko Kaji as Matsunaga Keiko
- Tatsuo Umemiya as Iwata Goro
- Hideo Murota as Hidaka
- Nobuo Kaneko as Akama
- Harumi Sone as Kanai Katsugi
- Takuzo Kawatani as Kajiyama
- Jirō Yabuki as Wakamoto Hideo
- Jūkei Fujioka as Kojima
- Yoshio Yoshida as Yamashiro Takashi
- Kin Sugai as Wakamoto Kimiyo
- Takao Yagi as Arai Hatsue
- Mikio Narita as Nozaki
- Junkichi Orimoto as Hatano Takechi
- Nagisa Oshima as Muramoto
- Kei Satō as Teramitsu Abara
- Takuya Fujioka as Sugi Masaki
- Kenji Imai as Matsunaga Shunji
- Nenji Kobayashi as Kitajima Akira
- Yasuo Matsumoto as Konichi Masao
- Kenta Mayumi as Fujioka Osamu
- Satoshi Nahen as Ikuma
- Mineko Maruhira as Sugimika
- Masaharu Arikawa as Ezaki Toshio
- Nobuo Yana as Ezaki Nobuhisa
- Hideo Shimada as Okawara Yoshiichi
- Teruo Fujinaga as Ueshima Takashi
- Shimoyama Takaya as Mizutani
- Tetsuo Ashida as Nishio
- Chisao Miyagi as Koike
- Kojiro Shirakawa as Asai
- Kuniomi Kitani as Okutani Isamu
- Takashi Shirai as Miyazaki
- Shigeru Inoue as Okamoto
- Katsutoshi Akiyama as Takeuchi Kiyoshi
- Yasuhiro Suzuki as Kenkichi
- Masataka Iwao as Kusumoto Masaharu
- Toshiyuki Sasaki as Miyake Noburo
- Shotaro Hayashi as Kito
- Toshio Tomogane as Hirokoshi
- Kazuo Kasahara as Kizu
- Masami Kodaka as Bito
- Takashi Ienoshima as Arai Shinkichi
- Kinji Nakamura as Shinzaki Bunpei
