= Space Battleship Yamato: Resurrection =

2009 film by Yoshinobu Nishizaki

- Directed by: Takeshi Shirato (Note: Chief Director (チーフディレクター)); Yoshinobu Nishizaki
- Screenplay by: Yoshinobu Nishizaki; Bull Ishihara; Atsuhiro Tomioka
- Story by: Yoshinobu Nishizaki (Note: Original Work (原作)); Shintaro Ishihara (Note: Original Plan (原案))
- Starring: Koichi Yamadera; Ayumi Fujimura; Ryoka Yuzuki
- Edited by: Masaki Sakamoto; Yoshinobu Nishizaki
- Music by: Kentaro Haneda; Hiroshi Miyagawa
- Production company: Enagio
- Distributed by: Toho
- Release date: December 12, 2009
- Running time: 135 minutes 123 minutes (Director's Cut)
- Country: Japan
- Language: Japanese

Space Battleship Yamato: Resurrection (宇宙戦艦ヤマト 復活篇, Uchū Senkan Yamato: Fukkatsu Hen) is a 2009 Japanese animated science fiction action film, and the first part of a planned series of films which are the latest addition to the Space Battleship Yamato saga. Resurrection is set in the year 2220, 21 years after the first Yamato story and 17 years after the story of the last film, Final Yamato. A wandering black hole is approaching the Solar System, and will surely destroy all life on Earth. The decision has been made to evacuate Earth's entire population. The planet to which Earth's population is being moved is called Amare, ruled by Queen Iriya, some 27,000 light years away in the Sairam star system. When the film opens, that task is already under way. The Yamato had been destroyed in 2203.

While planned as the first of a series of films, no others would be forthcoming. After the success of the live action film a year after the release of Resurrection, production began on a reboot series, based on the original 1974 series instead of further sequel films; Space Battleship Yamato 2199 began screening cinematically in April 2012.

== Plot ==
The film opens as the Earth flagship Blue Noah leads the First Emigration Fleet to Amare. Suddenly, thousands of unidentified ships appear and open fire. The warships of Earth's Fleet (EDF) counterattack, but are quickly overwhelmed. Blue Noah is damaged critically. On one of the failing support ships, Captain Yuki Mori Kodai, wife of the protagonist Susumu Kodai, orders her ship to do an emergency warp, but she vanishes mysteriously afterwards.

Thirty-eight-year-old Susumu Kodai, having quit the EDF sometime after Final Yamato, becomes captain of the cargo vessel Yuki. He picks up the distress signal from Blue Noah and quickly arrives at the wreck with a boarding party. Without warning, three enemy ships arrive. With Kodai at the helm, Blue Noah has just enough power to cover a small distance and fire one shot. Kodai's precise timing and maneuvering destroys all three ships.

Later, at the headquarters of the EDF, Commander Sanada discusses with Kodai about the approaching black hole. Kodai also learns that his wife became lost in the battle. Sanada wants Kodai to lead the Third Emigration Fleet, saying he should follow his wife's example of volunteering.

Kodai returns home, and is met by his daughter, Miyuki, who blames him for the supposed death of his wife. He is then called immediately back to HQ with news about the Second Emigration Fleet being destroyed by three different fleets, the Beldel and Furide and Ethos, not including the enemy fleet earlier. This means Earth now has four enemies. Kodai accepts command of the Third Emigration Fleet, and Sanada reveals his ship: the Yamato itself, newly rebuilt in the Aquarius ice asteroid. On the other side of the galaxy, a meeting took place, the leader of the Alliance and the fleet that attacked the Blue Noah and the First Emigration Fleet is revealed to be the SUS. Metzler, the Admiral of the SUS Fleet, the other Leaders, Amare, Beldel, Furide and Ethos were present. Metzler deceived the leaders that Earth is an invader, and they are barbarians showing the leaders footgate of Escort Ships from the First Emigration Fleet firing their Wave Motion Guns destroying many SUS Ships stunning the Leaders However, one leader—Gouri, admiral of the Ethos fleet belonging to the planet Ethos—is unsure.

The Yamato takes off and joins the Fleet, taking its place at the front as Flagship. In the planning room, the crew lays out the mission. The plan is to slingshot around a small black hole, BH199, and boost the arks and warships into high warp, propelling them to Amarh much faster than usual. Gouri watches the first group of arks slingshot and warp, and then, still unsure, orders an attack. Soon, the Yamato detects the Alliance Fleets and Kodai promptly orders all fighters on board to launch and the Emigration Escort Fleet to split into two groups to fight the Beldel and Ethos Fleets while the Yamato will fight the Furide. Soon, the Furide Fleet begins their attack with the Yamato drawing first blood on a Furide Ship. The enemy responded with a barrage of missiles only to be stopped by Shield Rockets fired from the Yamato.

On the other side of the battlefield, the Beldel Fleet is faced with a group of Emigration Escort Ships, both sides begin firing on each other in fury blaze of beams the Beldel launches their squadrons of fighters to battle, the squadrons of fighters from the Yamato intercepts the enemy squadrons and a dogfight ensures. The Furide Fleet begins a massive bombardment on the Yamato and the battleship responded with all guns blazing but 3 Furide Ships, the Furide Flagship among the 3, strayed off from the battle and straight for the Vulnerable Unarmed Arks and begins a bombardment of missiles, the Yamato notices the stray ships but is under heavy fire preventing the Battleship from moving, with quick thinking the Battleship deploys 3 docked heavy bombers and managed to successfully destroy 2 of the unsuspecting Furide Ships, one of the heavy bombers continued firing on the last surviving Furide ship which was the Flagship of the Furides and succeed in destroying the alien vessel killing the Furide Commander before they can cause more harm to the fleeing arks, meanwhile the Second Group of Escort Ships confronts the Ethos Fleet and started fighting taking losses on both sides, the Yamato was continuously hit hard by the Furide, thinking quick, Kodai orders a Missile Barrage which destroyed a large portion of the Furide Fleet, on board the Ethos Flagship Gouri notices the ferociousity of the Yamato in battle which inspires the Escort Fleet in battle, Gouri then orders the Fleets to concentrate on the Yamato, meanwhile the SUS Fleet which didn't participate the Battle, on board the SUS Flagship with Meltzlar onboard was quite surprised to see many Alliance Ships being destroyed, soon enough Escort Ships came to assist the Yamato in fighting the leaderless Furide Fleet, with majority of the arks successfully slingshoted from the black hole, Kodai orders the Escort Fleets to regroup and head for the black hole with the Yamato covering their escape, many ships were damaged while escaping, the Furide and Beldel Fleets turns their attention on the Yamato punishing the Battleship with barrage of fire, Ryo Kamijo, the Gunnery Officer of the Battleship prepares the Wave Motion Gun in anger only to be stopped with a slap from Kodai, explaining to him that if they fire the Gun, the Yamato will be drained of Energy leaving the Battleship Defenseless, obeying the Captain, the Gunnery officer turns off the Wave Motion Gun. As the Escort Fleet begins the Slingshot, on board the Ethos Flagship Gouri silently observes the Yamato in combat, Kodai witnesses an ark that didn't made the Slingshot and was under heavy fire from Alliance Ships, Kodai maneuvers the Yamato in between the Ark and the Enemy Fleets absorbing the fire to allow the Ark to Escape the Battleship was being pummeled heavily by the Combined Beldel and Furide Fleets even with the Shield Rockets being fired from the Yamato to defend the ark, both ships are still under heavy fire, when Gouri witnesses the Yamato putting herself in harm's way to defend an ark, Gouri concludes that he has been lied to. He orders the helmsman to fly in between the Yamato and the Beldel and Furides preventing them from firing, since the action of the Yamato is "not how barbarians act". He contacts Kodai and tells him that they were misled, twisted to do the bidding of the SUS. Seeing that the EDF Escort Fleet fought honorably, Gouri allows them to go in peace. It had some repercussions — he is later threatened by Barlsman, Commander-in-Chief of the SUS. However, Gouri holds his ground and states that it is the Ethos code of honor to let go an opponent who risks their lives in battle to let others live. Angered, Barlsman gives Gouri a very stern warning if he ever fail him again, the SUS will destroy the homeworld of the Ethos.

The Third Emigration Fleet and Escort Fleet successfully arrives at Amare, much to the joy of the Survivors of the first two Emigration Fleet, the Yamato descends to the Ocean and was greeted by a huge crowd with loud cheers, soon enough Kodai reaches land and spoke to an EDF Member who is a survivor of Yuki's ship, they entered a large hangar where the remains of destroyed Escort Ships from both the First and Second Emigration Fleets is kept, the survivor told Kodai what truly happened, Yuki's Ship found was completely empty, the Survivor passed Kodai a destroyed Captains Hat which belongs to Yuki. As the sun sets in the evening, the Bridge crew of the Yamato wondered if the people of Amare will call their Moon, Earth. Soon enough on Earth, EDF HQ was happy to hear that the Third Emigration Fleet successfully made it to Amare. Meanwhile, far away from Earth, the Black hole continues its journey to Earth. Back at Amare, Kodai spoke to Queen Iriya of Amare and she told Kodai about the Origins of the Alliance, they were then, the Victims of many Interstellar Wars fought by many Alien Species and as a result they were devastated, the devastation continued over generations and the devastation stopped when the SUS called for peace which gave birth to the Alliance. Kodai now realising the SUS is the leadership of the Alliance which the Queen confirms and stated that the Alliance is more of a Tyrannical Dictatorship under the guise of "Peace". The Amare came to hate the SUS but couldn't do anytjing as they were supplying the SUS with resources revealing that the Planet of Amare contain a rare Material which is sought by the SUS, in return the people of Amare receive protection from the SUS, after talking to the Queen Kodai was confronted by an Armed Amarean who is revealed to be General Pascal the leader of the Amare Military, he forces Kodai into a room, Kodai obeys the order only to be faced with 3 Armed Royal Guards upon entering, General Pascal demands that the Humans leave or they will be punished by the Alliance or destroy Amare, kodai refuses, the Royal Guards threats to kill him but the building shakes, realizing the SUS is attacking the City, General Pascal demands Kodai not to interfere, as it would make Amare-SUS relations worse. The SUS launches an Airstrike on the Amare City, dropping bombs on the streets killing numerous civilians, two Massive SUS Tanks and one Colossal SUS Siege Tank plowed the streets destroying buildings, the Amare Police along with armed citizens fought back, the Yamato floating at the distance, The Bridge crew was shocked, Ryo kamijo the gunnery officer demands the First officer to launch the Yamato to battle but they notices the SUS Bombers retreating, Kodai arrived on the bridge after returning from the City, he explains to the Crew of what he learned which stunned everyone, the Yamato goes on standby, the Yamato detects a second of wave of Bombers, this time with fighters among the groups of bombers they began their bombardment on the helpless city killing more civilians, the Amare Army now joining the fight against the SUS. The SUS War Machines firing at everything in their path destroying more buildings and killing countless. Above the skies the Ethos Fleet along with the Ethos Flagship arrives, seeing the devastation the SUS have created, Gouri contacted Metzlar asking why the SUS are attacking Amare, an ally of the Alliance, which Metzlar responses that Amare is sanctioned for defying the Alliance, horrified by the fact the SUS are attacking indiscriminately, Gouri confronts Metzlar that the Alliance wouldn't commit such acts which Metzlar finally reveals to Gouri that the SUS's decision is the decision of the Alliance and demands Gouri to start his attack on Amare which Gouri refuses, the SUS Fleet led by Metzlar descends from the sky to confront the Ethos Fleet, Gouri having enough of such Barbaric decisions, he insulted Metzlar ending the transmission, on board the Ethos Flagship the First Officer was surprised at Gouri insulting the SUS Admiral, Gouri, in an attempt to reclaim his honor and save Amare, orders the Ethos Fleet to prepare for battle. Back on the Yamato Kodak received a message from Gouri, both former enemies greeted each other with Salute, Gouri explains to Kodak of he's intentions on turning against the SUS and the Alliance, being pressed by the Alliance in exchange for "peace" which is how the Alliance operates, ending with a Salute, on board the SUS Flagship, Metzlar gives a big thumbs down and the SUS Fleet begins descending on the Ethos Fleet, both sides open fire on each other in a fury blaze of beams, Gouri aims for the Flagship of the SUS Maya on a Suicide Run, the Ethos Flagship bursts in speed towards the Maya in a final charge of honor, Kodai was shocked at what Gouri is doing, a vengeful Metzlar orders the Fleet to target the Ethos Flagship but the Resilient Ethos ship absorbs large amounts of fire and even ram pass a SUS Ship scaring Metzlar, the Ethos Flagship rams the Maya destroying the massive SUS Flagship killing Gouri and he's First Officer along with everyone else on both ships, but Metzlar managed to escaped with some surviving crew, both sides disengaged...

On board the Yamato Kodai salutes the fallen Admiral in silence, at the Amare City, Queen Iriya asked Pascal for he's thoughts on Ethos attacking the SUS which he didn't answer, a fellow Royal Guard reported that mass amounts of Citizens are gathered outside the Palace and their numbers are increasing, outside the streets the SUS Tanks slowly approaches the Palace firing at buildings, a fellow human survivor was caught in the crossfire, outside the Palace, the crowds cheer and wants to join the Yamato in battle. Back on the Yamato Kodai remembering that his wife always fought injustice, is inspired and informs Queen Iriya of his intention to declare war on the SUS. The Yamato fires volleys of missiles, destroying the SUS Fighters and Bombers and blowing up both SUS Tanks and the Colossal Siege Tank. The Queen is brought to tears and thanks Kodai and his crew for their bravery. As the arks return to Earth with a token force of escorts, the Escort Fleet follows the Yamato into battle, General Pascal is also inspired by Kodai's decision, the Amare Navy led by General Pascal on board the Amare Flagship joins the Escort fleet for one final battle: an assault on the nearby SUS space fortress. If it is destroyed, then the SUS will lose control over everything.

On the SUS Space Fortress, Metzlar meets with Barlsman and informs him of recent events and Barlsman assures him that there's no reason to panic.

Outside the Fortress, a massive combined Furide and Beldel and SUS Fleet stands ready and waits for their opponents to arrive for battle. The combined Fleet led by the Yamato and the Amare Flagship warps in, the Yamato deploys its Squadrons of fighters and heavy bombers, both sides starts firing on each other losing ships, the Squadrons of the Yamato faces off with Squadrons from the Beldel Fleet in a massive Dogfight, the Yamato then suffers damage from enemy Fire losing one of its main gun turrets, the ship's Warp Core starts to malfunction but was quickly fixed by the Chief Engineer Saving the Battleship from destruction, as the Battle rages into dangerous close quarters, kodai orders the Yamato To break off and aim for the center with cover for their squadrons, behind the combined enemy fleet, the SUS space fortress reveals itself from the mist of red clouds, surrounded by 5 massive pillars, Kodai surprised by the size of the fortress, orders Maho the Chief Navigator to analyse the fortress, inside the fortress, Barlsman was disappointed with Metzlar's tactics which he replied by ordering the Fortress Crew to prepare the Neutron Beam Cannons to fire on the Combined Earth and Amare fleet, the crew refuses as Allied ships were on the line of fire but Metzlar forces them to fire, outside the fortress, the 5 pillars are revealed to be the neutron guns, 2 of the pillars deployed its massive Gun barrel and fires a massive surge of neutron energy at the Fleets destroying almost all of the alliance ships, General Pascal orders the Amare Fleet to defend the Yamato the beam destroys the entire Amare Fleet and a large portion of the Escort Fleet, the Flagship of the Amare fleet was severely damaged defending the Battleship from the neutron beam with its shield, on board the burning Amare flagship, a dying Pascal bids the Yamato Good luck, the ship explodes, the bridge crew of the battleship was in total shock that the SUS fired on their own and was not so surprised when the surviving ships of the alliance turns and retreats from the battlefield, inside the fortress Metzlar requests they fire all 5 of the Neutron Guns on the Escort Fleet which Barlsman approves, the other 4 Pillars deploys their gun barrels and fires in unison, the Yamato and her Squadrons managed to escape the beam as they tear through the battlefield destroying the remaining Escort Ships, the Yamato fires a massive barrage on the fortress but they were deflected by its impenetrable shield, kodai orders the squadrons back to the ship, Maho reports to bridge about her findings and reveals to the crew about the inner workings of the space fortress, realising that the 5 pillars are also the shield generators for the fortress, the Yamato's First Officer requests to borrow the Shinano, Yamato's auxiliary ship but kodai refuses but the First Officer deliberately volunteers himself for this which kodai agrees, the Shinano fires a barrage of Wave Motion Missiles but they were ineffective, the Shinano was greeted with a massive barrage of anti air fire from 2 pillars damaging the Shinano, the First Officer already wounded, sacrifices himself and disables the defensive energy shield around the fortress by ramming destroying the Shinano shattering the shield like glass, inside the fortress a fearful Barlsman and Metzlar watch in horror while Kodai gives a Salute, he then orders the Crew to start up the wave motion gun while the fortress aims its Pillars on the Yamato, with the Wave Motion Gun ready, the Yamato unleashes five powerful shots, destroying the pillars revealing a massive sea and the main SUS Fortress sinks.

On board the Yamato, the crew celebrates but suddenly, an immense ship emerges from the sea, and bombards the Yamato with heavy beam fire before retreating into the sea and coming out from behind And bombarding the already damaged Yamato, the Immense Ship fired a Neutron Beam but the Yamato narrowly missed the shot, maho was in shock that such ship is Abel manipulate dimensions and wander them freely, the Damage Teams reports to Bridge of the damage the ship has suffered, the SUS Ship emerges from the front and pummels the Yamato with heavy Fire, when Kodai, realizing that the power source is the artificial sun behind it, uses the final available shot of the Wave Motion Gun on it, two small ships peeled off from the SUS Ship towards the Yamato pummeling the Battleship with fire but was swiftly destroyed by a missile barrage, the Yamato fires its last remaining Wave Motion Shot on the artificial sun collapsing the sun and turning it into a black hole. The Yamato escapes, while the enemy ship—with Metzlar and Barlsman in it—is torn apart and sucked into it. Metzler escaped the destruction of the SUS space fortress, and appears to the Yamato crew and reveals himself and the people of the SUS as energy beings that can change form, being sent to this galaxy from another universe. He then disappears.

The Yamato warps back to Earth, and the energy being Metzler appears again. He reveals that the black hole headed for Earth is artificially created and controlled: it will serve as a portal to "steal" Earth and take its resources, since they cannot be found in his world. Kodai realizes that it must have a power source. The Wave Motion Gun automatically reconfigured to enable it to fire all six shots in one go, a risky decision that could destroy the ship, but the crew unanimously agree that saving Earth is more important. The Yamato dives into the black hole, and as it reaches the core, the Wave Motion Gun fires, destroying the artificial weapon in a gigantic implosion. The blast from the Wave Motion Gun had ruptured and damaged the Yamato bow and front section; the third bridge (where the ship's navigation room resides) also suffers serious damage and is exposed to space, killing Chief Navigator Maho Orihara, who was working in it, and her assistants; but the ship is still space-worthy and orbits Earth in triumph. Earth can now be repopulated and the arks can return home. Kodai also reconciles with his daughter in the end.

== Production ==
In March 2002, a Tokyo court ruled that Yoshinobu Nishizaki legally owned the Yamato copyrights. Nishizaki and Matsumoto eventually settled; Nishizaki began work on a new movie, while Matsumoto planned a new Yamato series, both to take place after their respective stories. However, additional legal conflicts stalled both projects until August 2008, when Nishizaki announced plans for the release of his film on December 12, 2009.

The production makes ample use of CGI for the space battle scenes. Out of the 1860 cuts (shots) in the new film, 700 were produced with computer graphics. In particular, the battle scenes use composite 3D sequences and computer graphics; Nishizaki had established a new studio called Enagio in 2008 just to produce this film.

== Technology ==
The Yamato's size will be mostly unchanged at 263 metres in length and 62,000 tons in mass. The Yamato's signature wave-motion gun, which can take out an entire fleet, but which then leaves the ship drained of power — and vulnerable, has been improved to optionally fire six smaller shots in succession.

The film sees the reappearance of the Yamato's counter-attack missiles, not otherwise seen since the mission to Iscandar (first TV series). The defensive shield which forms upon detonation is now energy-based. Other defensive features include the battleship's armor, which is far stronger than originally depicted during the Battle of the Rainbow Nebula—in the film, the Yamato withstood a massive concentrated barrage from both Furide and Beldel Fleets and survived, and suffered minor to moderate damage during the battle against the SUS Dimensional Fortress. The armor finally gave way when the Yamato fired all 6 wave motion beams together, creating many holes in it.

Among the new technological items is a gravity-assisted warp process called a "long warp". The visual special effects for the Yamato undergoing warp have been improved, and now resemble something akin to Farscape's starburst. The Yamato's new multistage Wave Motion Gun can now fire a spectacular spray of tachyon-based energy in a succession of six bursts. Yamato's infamous third bridge is now painted blue, and houses more expensive gadgets to get blown up such as a 3-dimensional navigational cartography room.

As far as other ships go, a new model Earth battleship, "Super Andromeda", appears, as well as the Earth flagship, Blue Noah.

== Characters ==
=== Veteran ===
- Susumu Kodai (CV: Kōichi Yamadera), Captain of the Yamato, former Battle Commander.
- Yuki Mori Kodai (CV: Noriko Yume), Susumu's wife and former Radar/Computer Operator of the Yamato, captain of an escort battleship with the First Emigration Fleet, presumed lost in action.
- Tasuke Tokugawa (CV: Tōru Furuya), former Engineer of the Yamato, leaves his position as a commanding officer at the Earth Defense Force's Moonbase to become Chief Engineer of the Yamato.
- Shiro Sanada (CV: Takeshi Aono), Secretary of Science for the Earth Federation, former Science Officer of the Yamato.
- Jiro Shima (CV: Ryōtarō Okiayu), younger brother of Daisuke Shima, head of the Earth Federation's Migration Fleet.
- Dr. Sakezou Sado (CV: Ichirō Nagai) and Analyzer (CV: Kenichi Ogata), remain on Earth to watch over Dr. Sado's Safari Park.
- Captain Jūzō Okita (CV: Gorō Naya, stock footage)

=== New ===
==== Earth ====
- Miyuki Kodai (CV: Ayumi Fujimura) daughter of Kodai and Yuki, assistant to Dr. Sado.
- Kosaku Omura (CV: Chafurin), Vice Captain of the Yamato.
- Minoru Goda (CV: Akimitsu Takase), Artillery Specialist of the Yamato, replacing Nanbu.
- Atsushi Kobayashi (CV: Daisuke Namikawa), Chief Pilot of the Yamato's Cosmo Pulser Squad, replacing Katou.
- Miharu Sasaki (CV: Fuyuka Oura), Ship Doctor and Cosmo Pulser Pilot.
- Ryohei Nakanishi (CV: Kappei Yamaguchi), Communication Specialist of the Yamato, replaces Aihara.
- Yoichi Sakurai (CV: Kenji Nojima), Radar Specialist of the Yamato, replaces Ohta.
- Ryo Kamijo (CV: Kentarō Itō), New Tactical Commander of the Yamato.
- Saburo Kinoshita (CV: Kōsuke Toriumi), New Science Officer of the Yamato.
- Maho Orihara (CV: Ryōka Yuzuki), Chief Navigator of the Yamato, replaces the late Daisuke Shima.
- Sho and So Tenma (CV: Daisuke Sakaguchi), twin brothers, Engineers under Tasuke on the Yamato.
- Blue Noah Captain (CV: Osamu Kobayashi), captain of the Space Carrier Blue Noah

==== Aliens ====
- Queen Iriya (CV: Atsuko Tanaka) and General Pascal (CV: Kazuhiko Inoue) of Planet Amahr.
- Admiral Metzlar (CV: Hiroshi Yanaka) and Commander-in-Chief Balzman (CV: Shōzō Iizuka) of the SUS Empire.
- Admiral Gorui (CV: Masatō Ibu) and Captain Shihgal (CV: Takehito Koyasu) of Planet Ethos.

== Reception ==
The film debuted #7 at the Japanese box office but moved slowly off the charts a week later.

A reviewer on SciFiJapan said that he was pleased with the film, and that it gave the series a reboot that it had missed for 30 years. He went on to say, while the romance was definitely toned down, the action made up for it. "Computer enhancement works its greatest magic in scenes of outer space, especially those of black holes. The beauty and imagination of these scenes are nothing less than spectacular." However, he was disappointed by the enemy ship designs. "The weakest visual element in the film is the design of the enemy fleets. Yamato history is populated with dozens of sleek and exciting spaceship designs, so these new ship designs are a rather jarring and unimaginative change of pace." The reviewer concluded with, "SPACE BATTLESHIP YAMATO: RESURRECTION brings the famed space battleship back to the big screen in all its former glory, setting the stage for a live action version which will hit screen in Japan later this year. 2010 promises to be a banner year for Yamato fans, new and old."

On StarBlazers.com, a positive reviewer said that "I snapped to full attention for the finale. I can't say why, but it suddenly felt more like a true Yamato story than it did before. It gave me an immediate jolt of energy and took me all the way home, which makes it my favorite part." The review finished with this, referring to the character development: "To Nishizaki's credit, he tipped this in his Animage interview, saying his intention was to simply establish the new crew so they can be further developed "next time." I'd love to see a TV series spin off from this, but I have no idea if such a thing is possible. One thing's for sure: I'll be happy to see Part 2 in any Japanese theater."

== Other releases ==
The film was released on Region 2 DVD, UMD, and Blu-ray on July 23, 2010.
