= Space Emperor God Sigma =

Japanese anime television series

- Screenshot from Space Emperor God Sigma

宇宙大帝ゴッドシグマ (Uchū Taitei Goddo Shiguma)
- Genre: Mecha
- Created by: Saburō Yatsude
- Anime television series
- Directed by: Takeyuki Kanda (#1–12); Katsuhiko Taguchi (#13–50)
- Produced by: Heita Ezu (Tokyo Channel 12); Takashi Ijima; Itaru Orita (Toei)
- Music by: Hiroshi Tsutsui
- Studio: Tokyo Dōga (Note: Animation studio); Toei Company (Note: Production company)
- Licensed by: NA: Discotek Media
- Original network: Tokyo Channel 12
- Original run: March 19, 1980 – March 25, 1981
- Episodes: 50

Space Emperor God Sigma (宇宙大帝ゴッドシグマ, Uchū Taitei Goddo Shiguma) is a mecha anime television series aired from 1980 to 1981. It ran for 50 episodes. It is also referred to as "God Sigma, Empire of Space" and "Space Combination God Sigma".

== Concept ==
Space Emperor God Sigma was created by Toei's Television Division, under the name "Saburo Yatsude" and animated by Academy Production (who subcontracted Greenbox). The series was produced by Toei Company, and not by its own animation studio Toei Animation; Yoshinobu Nishizaki's Tokyo Dōga (later West Cape Corporation) provided the animation services. Toei Agency handled the advertising for the show, and its main sponsor was Popy (now Bandai's Boy's Toys Division).

This anime was the last that Takashi Ijima would work on; he had been part of Toei's TV division's projects since Chōdenji Robo Combattler V, which aired in 1976. Joined by Katsuhiko Taguchi, the chief director, the two created an anime that lasted for four full seasons, which was rare at the time of its broadcast. This show is a similar situation to the Robot Romance Trilogy, where Toei produced each show, but the animation was done by Nippon Sunrise.

== Story ==
The story is set in the year 2050 AD, and mankind has been steadily advancing its space technology. However, the planet is suddenly set upon by a mysterious enemy: the forces of Eldar, who came from 250 years in the future. In their time, 2300 AD, their planet Eldar was invaded by Earth, and soundly defeated by Earth's Trinity Energy, a mysterious energy used in their weaponry that possesses power many times that of a hydrogen bomb. The Eldar people's objective is to steal this Trinity Energy before it can be used against them.

The Eldar forces begin by taking over Jupiter's moon Io, one of the places humanity has immigrated to by then. After that, they begin to attack Trinity City with their legions of Cosmosauruses in order to steal the Trinity Energy. Toshiya and his friends use God Sigma to protect the planet and the Trinity Energy, and the battle evolves into a long war to retake Io.

== Characters ==
=== Trinity City ===
==== Toshiya Dan ====
Voiced by: Kei Tomiyama, Tomokazu Seki (in Super Robot Wars Z)
The protagonist of the show. He is an 18-year-old second-generation pioneer living on Jupiter's moon, Io. He is the main pilot of God Sigma.

==== Julie Noguchi ====
Voiced by: Yoshito Yasuhara
Assistant to Dr. Kazami, the head scientist and researcher at Trinity City, he is one of the three pilots of God Sigma.

==== Kira Kensaku ====
Voiced by: Tessho Genda
One of Toshiya's good friends, and also a native of Io.

=== Eldar's Forces ===
==== Supreme Commander Teral ====
Voiced by: Noriko Ohara, Hiromi Tsuru (in Super Robot Wars Z)
The supreme commander of the Eldar forces sent to Earth to steal the Trinity Energy.

==== Commander Leats ====
Voiced by: Shouzou Iizuka
The commander of the Cosmosauruses, under Teral's command.

==== Jeela ====
Voiced by: Rihoko Yoshida
A commander under Teral's command.

== Mecha ==
=== God Sigma ===
The completed giant robot formed when the Kuuraioh, Kaimeioh, and Rikushin'oh combine with the Big-Wing.

With the command "Sigma Formation", the three robots form a triangle, and when they shout "Trinity Charge", the Big-Wing flies to them and combines. Two separate combination scenes exist in the anime - one during the beginning, and one from the middle onwards.

Its total height was originally stated to be 265 meters tall, but since this would cause difficulties for the actual animation, it was changed to 66 meters. It weighs 1200 tons, and its power source is Trinity Energy. It possesses the ability to cruise from Earth to Jupiter and back. It can be controlled by the main pilot, Toshiya, but without the other two component robots' generators to supplement his own, it's not as powerful.

In the final episode, it and the giant mecha Gargos destroy each other, but it is repaired after the war and revamped to be a single-pilot machine, and Toshiya sets off with it by himself.

== Staff ==
- Original work: Saburo Yatsude
- Producer: Takashi Ijima, Heita Ezu (Tokyo Channel 12), Itaru Orita (Toei TV division)
- Music: Hiroshi Tsutsui
- Music performance: Tokyo Indoors Music Society
- Chief director: Takeyuki Kanda (episodes 1–10), Katsuhiko Taguchi (episodes 11–50)
- Character design: Kazuhiko Utaka
- Character concepts: Kaoru Shintani
- Design assistance: Yutaka Izubuchi
- Mechanical design: Katsushi Murakami, Submarine
- Artistic director: Kazuo Okada, Tadanoumi Shimokawa
- Music director: Jouhei Kawamura
- Production company: Toei Company, Ltd., Toei Agency (advertising)
- Animation services: Academy Production, Tokyo Dōga
- Animation assistance: Greenbox, Anime City, Sunluck

== Episodes ==
No.	Title	Directed by	Written by	Original release date
1	"Get Mad, Warrior of Io" "Okore Io no Senshi" (Japanese: 怒れ イオの戦士)	Directed by : Kenji Terada; Storyboarded by : Minoru Yokitani	Katsuhiko Taguchi	March 19, 1980
2	"Trinity Base Surfacing" "Toriniti Kichi Fujō" (Japanese: トリニティ基地浮上)	Kenji Terada	Hisashi Yamazaki	March 26, 1980
3	"Combining Toward Io" "Io ni Mukatte Gattai da" (Japanese: イオに向って合体だ)	Directed by : Takao Yotsuji; Storyboarded by : Yuichiro Yokoyama	Masaki Tsuji	April 16, 1980
4	"Cosmosaurus' Secret" "Kosumozaurusu no Himitsu" (Japanese: コスモザウルスの秘密)	Directed by : Kazuya Miyazaki; Storyboarded by : Saburo Nodera	Akira Nakahara	April 23, 1980
5	"Shrew Rescue Operation" "Jajauma Kyūshutsu Sakusen" (Japanese: じゃじゃ馬救出作戦)	Directed by : Kenji Terada; Storyboarded by : Higashi Numajiri	Akira Nakahara	April 29, 1980
6	"Little Intruder" "Chiisana Shinnyūsha" (Japanese: 小さな侵入者)	Directed by : Takao Yotsuji; Storyboarded by : Yuichiro Yokoyama	Masaki Tsuji	April 29, 1980
7	"Launch into The Moon" "Getsumen e Shutsugeki Seyo" (Japanese: 月面へ出撃せよ)	Directed by : Kazuya Yamazaki; Storyboarded by : Saburo Nodera	Akira Nakahara	April 30, 1980
8	"The Great Naughty Mission" "Wanpaku Dai Sakusen" (Japanese: わんぱく大作戦)	Directed by : Kiyoshi Yoko; Storyboarded by : Nobuyuki Kitajima	Akira Nakahara	May 7, 1980
9	"Survivor From Io" "Io kara no Seikan-Sha" (Japanese: イオからの生還者)	Directed by : Kazuya Yamazaki; Storyboarded by : Saburo Nodera	Akira Nakahara	May 14, 1980
10	"As a Father, as a Doctor" "Chichi to Shite Hakase to Shite" (Japanese: 父として博士として)	Directed by : Hitoshi Takaito; Storyboarded by : Kenji Terada	Masaki Tsuji	May 21, 1980
11	"Little Lover in Crisis" "Chiisana Koibito no Kiki" (Japanese: 小さな恋人の危機)	Directed by : Hideyoshi Oga; Storyboarded by : Tatsuma Ko	Hirohisa Soda	May 28, 1980
12	"Enemy Elder Star Found" "Teki Erudā Hoshi o Hakken" (Japanese: 敵エルダー星を発見)	Takao Yotsuji	Masaki Tsuji	June 4, 1980
13	"Io's Flowers Bloomed" "Io no Hana ga Saita" (Japanese: イオの花が咲いた)	Directed by : Kazuya Yamazaki; Storyboarded by : Saburo Nodera	Hisashi Yamazaki	June 11, 1980
14	"Angry Showdown" "Ikari no Taiketsu" (Japanese: 怒りの対決)	Directed by : Kazuya Yamazaki; Storyboarded by : Saburo Nodera	Hisashi Yamazaki	June 18, 1980
15	"Dangerous Presents" "Kikenna Purezento" (Japanese: 危険なプレゼント)	Hiroshi Kuno	Masaki Sakurai	June 25, 1980
16	"The Secret of the Enemy Commander Teral" "Tekishō Teraru no Himitsu" (Japanese: 敵将テラルの秘密)	Jun Narumi	Masaki Tsuji	July 2, 1980
17	"Giant Robot Buyer" "Kyodai Robotto no Kainushi" (Japanese: 巨大ロボットの買主)	Directed by : Jun Narumi; Storyboarded by : Tatsuma Ko	Akira Nakahara	July 9, 1980
18	"The Terrifying Combination Breaker" "Kyōfu no Gattai Kuzushi" (Japanese: 恐怖の合体くずし)	Jun Narumi	Hisashi Yamazaki	July 16, 1980
19	"Robot Unable to Launch" "Robotto Hasshinfuno" (Japanese: ロボット発進不能)	Directed by : Kazuya Yamazaki; Storyboarded by : Saburo Nodera	Hisashi Yamazaki	July 23, 1980
20	"Julie's Secret Savings" "Jurii no Himitsu Chokin" (Japanese: ジュリイの秘密貯金)	Directed by : Kazuyuki Okasako; Storyboarded by : Koji Enomoto	Masaki Sakurai	July 30, 1980
21	"Break the Meteorite Encirclement" "Inseki Hōimō o Yabure" (Japanese: 隕石包囲網を破れ)	Directed by : Kazuyuki Okasako; Storyboarded by : Raita Goto	Masaki Sakurai	August 6, 1980
22	"Sky Thunder King Does Not Return" "Kūrai-ō Kikan Sezu" (Japanese: 空雷王帰還せず)	Directed by : Kazuya Yamazaki; Storyboarded by : Saburo Nodera	Akira Nakahara	August 13, 1980
23	"I Saw a Phantom Fish" "Maboroshi no Sakana o Mita" (Japanese: 幻の魚を見た)	Hiroshi Kuno	Masaki Sakurai	August 20, 1980
24	"200km to Io" "Io e 200 Kiro" (Japanese: イオへ200キロ)	Kazuyuki Okasako	Akira Nakahara	August 27, 1980
25	"Base Movement Command" "Kichi Idō Shirei" (Japanese: 基地移動指令)	Directed by : Kazuya Yamazaki; Storyboarded by : Saburo Nodera	Akira Nakahara	September 3, 1980
26	"Cute Rebel" "Kawaii Hangyaku-sha" (Japanese: 可愛い反逆者)	Directed by : Kazuya Yamazaki; Storyboarded by : Saburo Nodera	Akira Nakahara	September 10, 1980
27	"Enemy of 2300" "2300-nen no Teki" (Japanese: 2300年の敵)	Hideyoshi Oga	Masaki Sakurai	September 17, 1980
28	"Prelude to a New Battle" "Atarashiki Tatakai no Jokyoku" (Japanese: 新しき戦いの序曲)	Directed by : Kazuya Yamazaki; Storyboarded by : Saburo Nodera	Akira Nakahara	September 24, 1980
29	"Behold the White Flag of the Earth" "Chikyū no Shirahata o Miyo" (Japanese: 地球の白旗を見よ)	Hiroshi Kuno	Masaki Sakurai	October 1, 1980
30	"Full of Danger" "Kiken ga Ippai" (Japanese: 危険がいっぱい)	Directed by : Kazuya Yamazaki; Storyboarded by : Saburo Nodera	Akira Nakahara	October 8, 1980
31	"Latest Io Information" "Io Saishin Jōhō" (Japanese: イオ最新情報)	Directed by : Hiroyuki Ki; Storyboarded by : Koji Enomoto	Akira Nakahara	October 15, 1980
32	"Duel for the Moon" "Tsuki o Kaketa Kettō" (Japanese: 月を賭けた決闘)	Directed by : Shigeyasu Yamauchi; Storyboarded by : Koichiro Moriyama	Satoshi Suyama	October 22, 1980
33	"Hell's Stadium" "Jigoku no Sutajiamu" (Japanese: 地獄のスタジアム)	Kazuyuki Okasako	Satoshi Suyama	October 29, 1980
34	"Enemy Commander Teral's Tears" "Tekishō Teraru no Namida" (Japanese: 敵将テラルの涙)	Koichiro Moriyama	Masaki Sakurai	November 5, 1980
35	"The Day of Teral's Execution" "Teraru Shokei no Hi" (Japanese: テラル処刑の日)	Hiroshi Yoshida	Akira Nakahara	November 12, 1980
36	"My Julie's Younger Sister" "Waga Juri no Imouto" (Japanese: 我がジュリイの妹)	Jun Narumi	Satoshi Suyama	November 19, 1980
37	"The Secret of 2300" "2300-nen no Himitsu" (Japanese: 2300年の秘密)	Hiroshi Kuno	Masaki Sakurai	November 26, 1980
38	"Departure to Io" "Io e no Tabidachi" (Japanese: イオへの旅立ち)	Hideo Watanabe	Masayuki Shimada	December 3, 1980
39	"Who is the Traitor" "Ugaririmono wa Dareda" (Japanese: 裏切者は誰だ)	Kazuyuki Okasako	Satoshi Suyama	December 10, 1980
40	"Deadly Mars" "Shi o Maneku Kasei" (Japanese: 死を招く火星)	Johei Matsura	Akira Nakahara	December 17, 1980
41	"Birthday is the Day of the Funeral" "Tanjōbi wa Sōshiki no Hi" (Japanese: 誕生日は葬式の日)	Hiroshi Yoshida	Masaki Sakurai	December 24, 1980
42	"Insurrection in Mars" "Kasei no Hanran" (Japanese: 火星の反乱)	Hiroyuki Ki	Satoshi Suyama	December 31, 1980
43	"Pick up Teral's Bones" "Teraru no Hone o Hiroe" (Japanese: テラルの骨を拾え)	Jun Narumi	Masayuki Shimada	January 7, 1981
44	"Io Has Disappeared" "Io ga Kieta" (Japanese: イオが消えた)	Hiroshi Kuno	Masaki Sakurai	January 14, 1981
45	"Fighting Earthlings on Io" "Tatakau・Io no Chikyūjin" (Japanese: 闘う・イオの地球人)	Johei Matsura	Akira Nakahara	January 21, 1981
46	"Demented Declaration of Defeat" "Kyōki no Haikboku Sengen" (Japanese: 狂気の敗北宣言)	Kazuya Yamazaki	Masaki Sakurai	January 28, 1981
47	"Dr. Kazami's Rebellion" "Kazami Hakase no Hangyaku" (Japanese: 風見博士の反逆)	Hiroshi Yoshida	Hirohisa Soda	February 4, 1981
48	"Standing on the Land of Io" "Io no Ji ni Tatsu" (Japanese: イオの地に立つ)	Johei Matsura	Hisashi Yamazaki	February 11, 1981
49	"Gravestones on Io" "Io ni Tatsu Bohyō" (Japanese: イオに立つ墓標)	Kazuyuki Okasako	Masaki Sakurai	February 18, 1981
50	"Journey towards the Future" "Mirai e no Tabidachi" (Japanese: 未来への旅立ち)	Kazuya Yamazaki	Masaki Sakurai	February 25, 1981

== Theme songs ==
Opening theme: "Ganbare! Uchuu no Senshi" (Do Your Best, Space Warrior!)

- Vocals: Isao Sasaki, Koroogi '73, Columbia Yurikago-kai
- Lyrics: Saburo Yatsude
- Composition: Asei Kobayashi
- Arrangement: Masahisa Takeichi

Ending theme: "Red Blue Yellow"

- Vocals: Kumiko Kaori, Koroogi '73, Columbia Yurikago-kai
- Lyrics: Saburo Yatsude
- Composition: Asei Kobayashi
- Arrangement: Masahisa Takeichi

The ending theme, "Red Blue Yellow", consists of the planets in the Solar System in order. At the time of the show's broadcast, Pluto was actually inside the orbit of Neptune. This was not reflected in the animation, the reason being that the show itself is set in the year 2050. Also, the rings of Jupiter had just been discovered the year before, so in the ending animation, Jupiter is depicted with rings. However, in contrast to the actual rings of Jupiter, which are too thin to see a shadow cast on the planet, the picture of Jupiter in the ending sequence does have the shadow of rings on it.

== Media ==
The series was telecast in Italy, simply titled God Sigma.

God Sigma toys were released under the premier Godaikin toy label in Japan and Hong Kong in the 1980s.

In March 2011, Pony Canyon released a complete DVD box set, which only had a limited production run.

In July 2024, Discotek Media released a Blu-ray box set. It is the first English release of the series.

== Appearances in other works ==
Space Emperor God Sigma appears in various games by Banpresto (currently Bandai Namco Games). Its first appearance was in a 1992 Famicom game called Shuffle Fight. Its second was in the 2008 PS2 game Super Robot Wars Z, but by this time, Toshiya's voice actor Tomiyama Kei had died, so the role was given to Tomokazu Seki instead. In the same game, a robot from Gravion called God Σ Gravion appears, triggering a conversation between the characters of each series. God Sigma also appears in the game's two-part sequel, 2nd Super Robot Wars Z: Hakai-hen and Saisei-hen.
