= Kazuo Kasahara =

Japanese screenwriter

Kazuo Kasahara (笠原 和夫, Kasahara Kazuo; 8 May 1927 – 12 December 2002) was a Japanese screenwriter particularly known for his work in the yakuza film genre. He was born in the Nihonbashi area of Tokyo and dropped out of Nippon University.

== Works ==
- Battles Without Honor and Humanity (1973)
- Battles Without Honor and Humanity: Deadly Fight in Hiroshima (1973)
- Battles Without Honor and Humanity: Proxy War (1974)
- Battles Without Honor and Humanity: Police Tactics (1974)
- Cops vs. Thugs (1975)
- Yakuza Graveyard (1976)
- The Battle of Port Arthur (1980)
- Final Yamato (1983)
- Odin: Photon Sailer Starlight (1985)

== See also ==
- Kinji Fukasaku
- Haruhiko Arai – a screenwriter and a movie critic who wrote 'Dramas of Showa' (published from Ohta Publishing) about Kasahara with Kasahara.
