= Tōru Furuya =

Japanese voice actor (born 1953)

- 古谷 徹
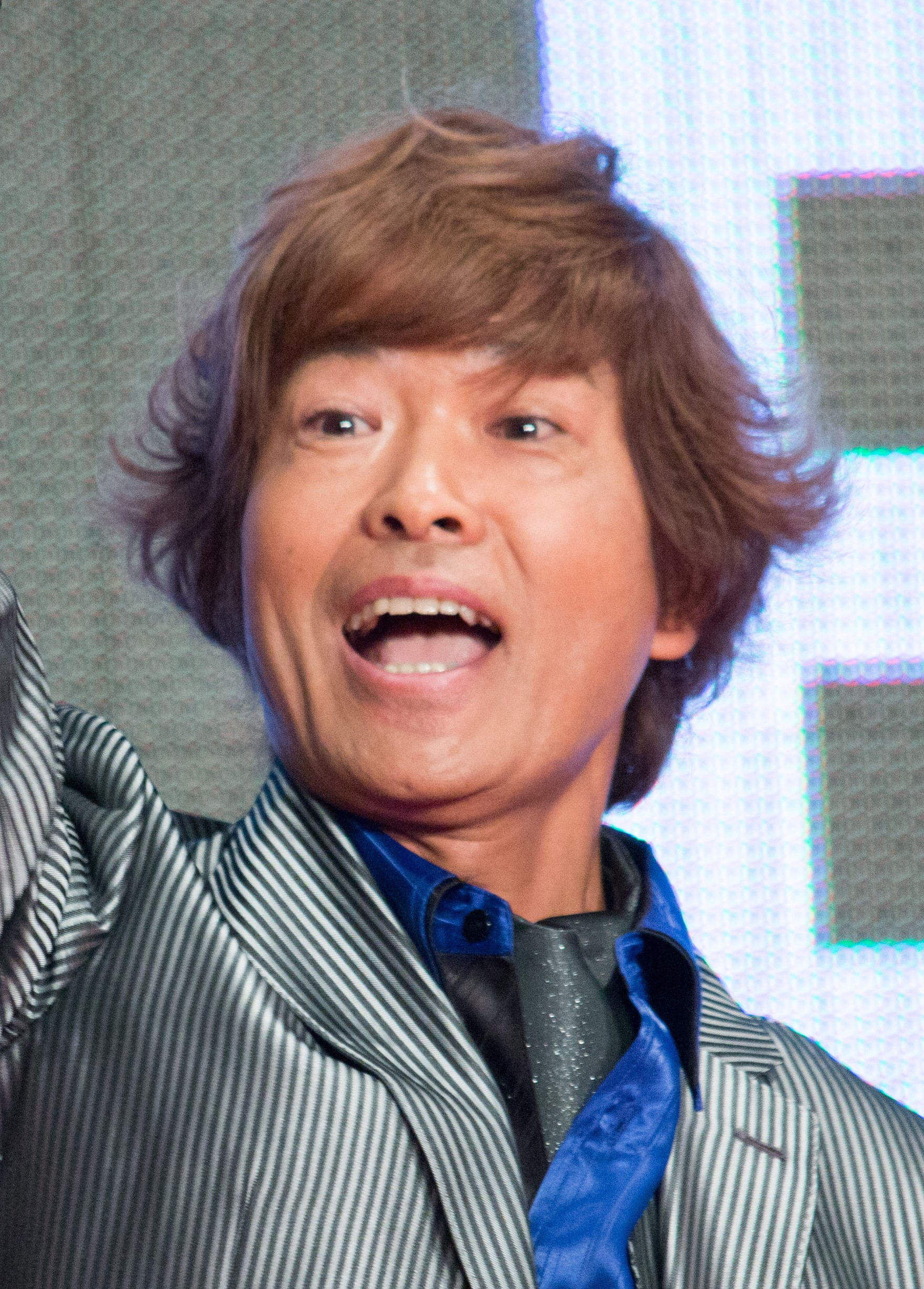
- Furuya at the 2015 Tokyo International Film Festival
- Born: July 31, 1953 (age 73); Yokohama, Kanagawa Prefecture, Japan
- Occupations: Actor; voice actor; narrator
- Years active: 1958–present
- Agent: Aoni Production
- Notable work: Star of the Giants as Hyūma Hoshi; Mobile Suit Gundam as Amuro Ray; Saint Seiya as Pegasus Seiya; Dragon Ball as Yamcha; Kimagure Orange Road as Kyōsuke Kasuga; Sailor Moon as Tuxedo Mask; One Piece as Sabo; Detective Conan as Rei Furuya/Tōru Amuro/Bourbon; Super Mario Bros.: The Great Mission to Rescue Princess Peach! as Mario
- Spouses: Mami Koyama (m. 1976–1983); Satomi Majima (m. 1985)
- Children: 1
- Website: www.torushome.com

Tōru Furuya (古谷 徹, Furuya Tōru; born July 31, 1953, in Yokohama, Kanagawa Prefecture) is a Japanese actor and narrator. As a child, he was a member of Gekidan Himawari, a children's acting troupe. He has been employed by talent management firm Aoni Production since 1982.

Furuya is most known for the anime roles of Amuro Ray (Gundam), Hyūma Hoshi (Star of the Giants), Pegasus Seiya (Saint Seiya), Yamcha (Dragon Ball), Kyōsuke Kasuga (Kimagure Orange Road) and Tuxedo Mask (Sailor Moon). He considers them his most important roles. He also voiced Mario in several anime and commercials, starting with the film Super Mario Bros.: The Great Mission to Rescue Princess Peach!, released in 1986.

He also used a pseudonym, Noboru Sōgetsu (蒼月 昇, Sōgetsu Noboru), when playing Ribbons Almark in Mobile Suit Gundam 00 (he used his real name in the narration role) and as Zen Kirishima in Sekai-ichi Hatsukoi. Both the narration role and Ribbons Almark were Furuya's first role in a non-Universal Century Gundam series. He is also the most well known official dubbing voice for Hong Kong action film actor Yuen Biao.

== Personal life ==
Furuya married voice actress Mami Koyama in 1976; they would later divorce in 1983. He married Satomi Majima on March 23, 1985.

On May 22, 2024, Furuya posted a public apology to Twitter, confirming a recent report and interview in Shūkan Bunshun magazine in which it was reported that he had an extramarital affair with a female fan 37 years his junior. The affair lasted for around four and a half years, until September 2023. He admitted to raising his hand to strike her once, as well as pressuring her into having an abortion.

Because of this, his Showroom program was abruptly cancelled and he was dropped from Metaphor: ReFantazio, with all of his characters getting recast.

On June 22, 2024, Furuya announced that he would step down from his roles in Detective Conan and One Piece. On June 28, 2024, Bandai Namco Filmworks began to consider employing a new voice actor for Amuro Ray for later works of the Gundam series in wake of Furuya's affair being made public. On October 4, 2024, Toei Animation announced that the role of Yamcha had been recast to Ryōta Suzuki for Dragon Ball Daima.

== Appearances ==
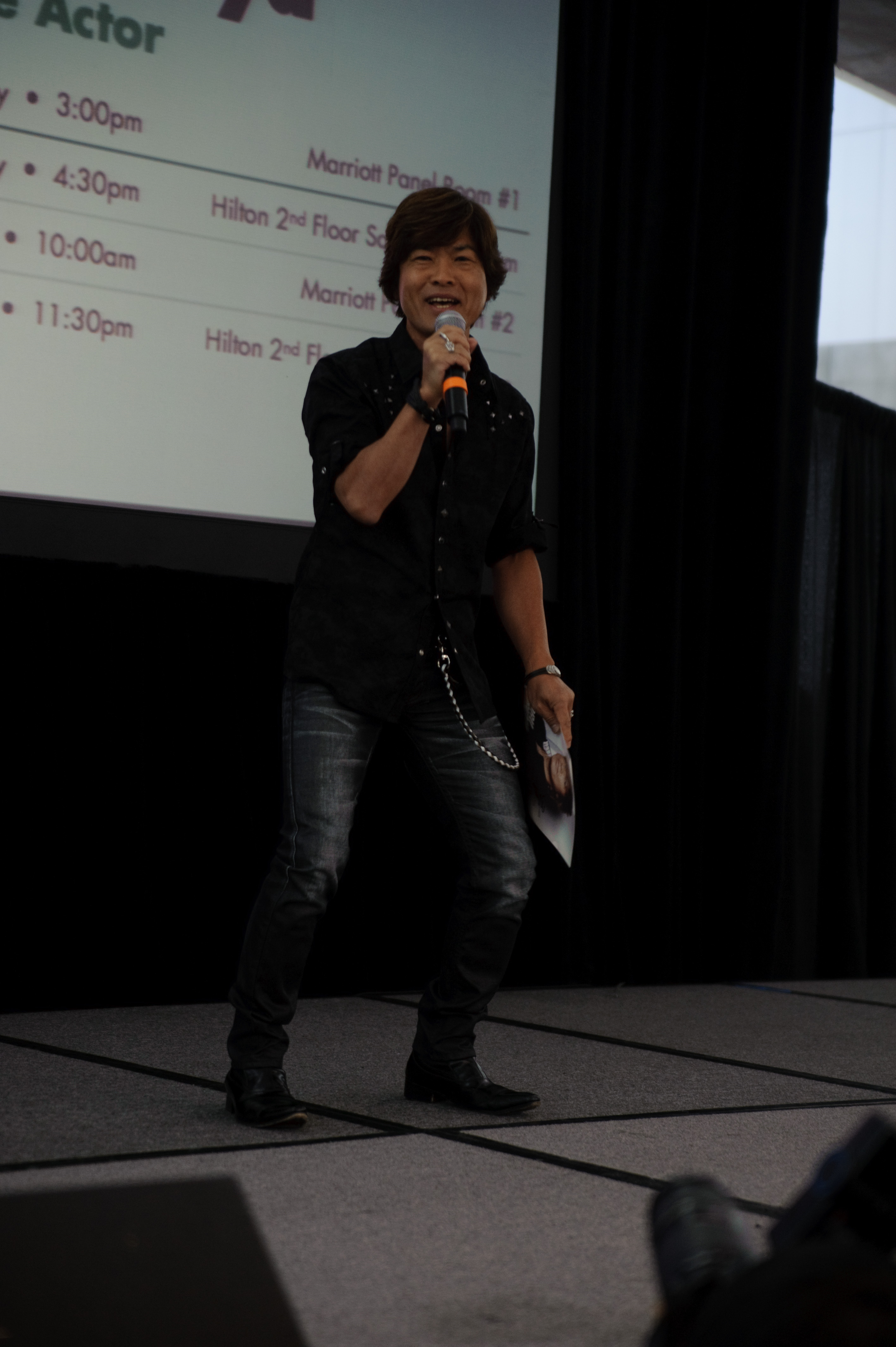
Furuya at FanimeCon 2011 Opening Ceremony

In 2011, Furuya appeared as a guest at the FanimeCon convention held that year at the San Jose McEnery Convention Center in San Jose, California.

Furuya was featured as a guest at Tsukino-Con in British Columbia in February 2017. Furuya was going to be featured as a guest at MomoCon 2024, but his appearance was cancelled due to the affair/abuse scandal.

== Filmography ==
=== Television animation ===
1960s

- Kaizoku Ōji (1966), Kid
- Star of the Giants (1968), Hyūma Hoshi

1970s

- Steel Jeeg (1975), Hiroshi Shiba
- Groizer X (1976), Jō Umisaka
- Hyōga Senshi Gaisragger (1977), Ken Shiki
- Yakyūkyō no Uta (1977), Yamai
- Gordian Warrior (1979), Ryōma Okamoto
- Mobile Suit Gundam (1979), Amuro Ray
- Space Battleship Yamato III (1979), Tasuke Tokugawa
- Space Carrier Blue Noah (1979), Shin Himoto

1980s

- Maeterlinck's Blue Bird: Tyltyl and Mytyl's Adventurous Journey (1980), Tyltyl
- Marine Snow no Densetsu (1980), Hiro Umino
- Queen Millennia (1981), Daisuke Yomori
- The Swiss Family Robinson: Flone of the Mysterious Island (1981), Franz Robinson
- Akū Daisakusen Srungle (1983), Jet
- Nanako SOS (1983), Shūichi Iidabashi
- Nine (1983), Katsuya Niimi
- Plawres Sanshiro (1983), Shingu Narita
- Special Armored Battalion Dorvack (1983), Masato Mugen
- Stop!! Hibari-kun! (1983), Kōsaku Sakamoto
- Katri, Girl of the Meadows (1984), Martti
- Twin Hawks (1984), Taka Sawatari
- Video Warrior Laserion (1984), Takashi Katori
- Mobile Suit Zeta Gundam (1985), Amuro Ray
- Urusei Yatsura (1985), Shingo Oniwaban
- Dragon Ball (1986), Yamcha, Kogamera
- Highschool! Kimen-gumi (1986), Harumage Don
- Saint Seiya (1986), Pegasus Seiya
- Kimagure Orange Road (1987), Kyōsuke Kasuga
- Dragon Ball Z (1989), Yamcha, Saibaiman
- Dragon Quest (1989), Abel

1990s

- Kyatto Ninden Teyandee (1990), Puma Pochi
- 21 Emon (1991), Wantonakku Kōshaku (Duke Wantonakku)
- Cooking Papa (1992), Toshio Nekkota
- Sailor Moon (1992), Mamoru Chiba/Tuxedo Mask/King Endymion
- Marmalade Boy (1994), Shinichi Namura
- Dr. Slump (1997), Suppaman
- Dragon Ball GT: A Hero's Legacy (1997), Puck
- The Big O (1999), Bonnie Fraser
- Great Detective Conan (1996), Hiroshi Akimoto, Tōru Amuro/Bourbon/Rei Furuya
- GTO (1999), Suguru Teshigawara

2000s

- Detective School Q (2003), Hitoshi Shinoda
- Akagi (2005), Narration
- Black Jack (2005), Dr. Daigo Ōedo
- Ultimate Girls (2005), UFOman
- Mobile Suit Gundam 00 (2007), Narration, Ribbons Almark
- Casshern Sins (2008), Casshern
- Mōryō no Hako (2008), Mysterious Man (Shunkō Kubo)
- Dragon Ball Kai (2009), Yamcha
- Kūchū Buranko (2009), Hideo Tsuda

2010s

- Inuyasha: The Final Act (2010), Shikon no Tama
- Pocket Monsters: Best Wishes! (2011), Burgh
- Un-Go (2011), Jirou Shimada
- Gintama (2011), General Eren/Elizabeth
- Saint Seiya Omega (2012), Sagittarius Seiya, Narration
- Dragon Ball Kai Majin Boo Saga (2014), Yamcha
- Mobile Suit Gundam-san (2014), Narration
- One Piece (2014), Sabo
- Dragon Ball Super (2015), Yamcha
- GeGeGe no Kitarō (2018), Ibukimaru

2020s

- D4DJ First Mix (2020), Ryūjin Kofune
- Detective Conan: Police Academy Arc (2021), Rei Furuya
- Birdie Wing: Golf Girls' Story (2022), Reiya Amuro
- Detective Conan: Zero's Tea Time (2022), Rei Furuya/Tōru Amuro
- Fluffy Paradise (2024), Dale
- Highspeed Etoile (2024), Narrator
- Mobile Suit Gundam GQuuuuuuX (2025), Endymion unit

=== Anime films ===
- Star of the Giants series (1969–1982), Hyūma Hoshi
- Be Forever Yamato (1980), Tasuke Tokugawa
- Toward the Terra (1980), Tony
- Mobile Suit Gundam (1981), Amuro Ray
- Mobile Suit Gundam: Soldiers of Sorrow (1981), Amuro Ray
- The Legend of Sirius (1981), Sirius
- Mobile Suit Gundam: Encounters in Space (1982), Amuro Ray
- Queen Millennia (1982), Daisuke Yomori
- Final Yamato (1983), Tasuke Tokugawa
- Genma Taisen (1983), Jō Azuma
- Nine (1983), Katsuya Niimi
- Windaria (1986), Izu
- Dragon Ball series (1986–1988), Yamcha
- Super Mario Bros.: The Great Mission to Rescue Princess Peach! (1986), Mario
- 11 Piki no Neko to Ahōdori (1986), Toraneko Taishō
- Saint Elmo – Hikari no Raihousha (1987), Issei Yūki
- Saint Seiya series (1987–2012), Pegasus Seiya
- Mobile Suit Gundam: Char's Counterattack (1988), Amuro Ray
- Dragon Ball Z series (1990–), Yamcha
- Ultraman: The Adventure Begins (1989), Scott Masterson/Ultraman Scott
- Kim's Cross (1990), Kim Jae-Ha
- Sailor Moon series (1993–2001), Mamoru Chiba
- Lupin III: Dead or Alive (1996), Pannish
- Pocket Monsters the Movie: Mewtwo Strikes Back (1998), Sorao
- Mobile Suit Zeta Gundam: A New Translation - Heirs to the Stars (2005), Amuro Ray
- Mobile Suit Zeta Gundam: A New Translation II - Lovers (2005), Amuro Ray
- Mobile Suit Zeta Gundam: A New Translation III - Love is the Pulse of the Stars (2006), Amuro Ray
- Detective Conan: The Private Eyes' Requiem (2006), Ito Suehiko
- Paprika (2006), Dr. Kosaku Tokita
- Space Battleship Yamato: Resurrection (2009), Tasuke Tokugawa
- Bleach: Hell Verse (2010), Shuren
- Mobile Suit Gundam 00 The Movie: A wakening of the Trailblazer (2010), E.A. Ray
- Expelled from Paradise (2014), Alonzo Percy
- Sekai-ichi Hatsukoi: Yokozawa Takafumi no Baai (2014), Zen Kirishima
- One Piece Film: Gold (2016), Sabo
- Detective Conan: The Darkest Nightmare (2016), Rei Furuya/Tōru Amuro
- Eureka Seven: Hi-Evolution 1 (2017), Adrock Thurston
- Detective Conan: Zero the Enforcer (2018), Rei Furuya/Tōru Amuro
- Even if the World Will End Tomorrow (2019), narrator
- The Legend of the Galactic Heroes: Die Neue These Seiran (2019), Freiherr Flegel
- The Journey (2021), Aus
- Mobile Suit Gundam: Hathaway (2021), Amuro Ray
- Detective Conan: The Bride of Halloween (2022), Rei Furuya/Tōru Amuro
- Mobile Suit Gundam: Cucuruz Doan's Island (2022), Amuro Ray
- Detective Conan: Black Iron Submarine (2023), Rei Furuya/Tōru Amuro
- Mobile Suit Gundam: Hathaway – The Sorcery of Nymph Circe (2026), Amuro Ray

=== Original video animation (OVA) ===
- Prefectural Earth Defense Force (1986), Hiroaki Narita
- One-pound Gospel (1988), Kosaku Hatanaka
- Kimagure Orange Road (1989), Kyōsuke Kasuga
- Legend of the Galactic Heroes (1989), Andrew Fork
- Amada Anime Series: Super Mario Bros. (1989), Mario
- Urusei Yatsura: The Electric Household Guard (1989), Shingo Oniwaban
- Utsunomiko (1990), Utsunomiko
- Kyōfu Shinbun (1991), Rei Kigata
- Kyūkyoku Chōjin R (1991), Tsuyoshi
- Super Mario World: Mario to Yoshi no Bōken Land (1991), Mario
- Macross II (1992), Feff
- Black Jack (1995), Leslie
- Arcade Gamer Fubuki (2002), Mysterious Person
- Saint Seiya: Hades — Chapter Sanctuary (2002), Pegasus Seiya
- Mobile Suit Gundam Unicorn: Episode 7: Over the Rainbow (2014), Amuro Ray
- Mobile Suit Gundam: The Origin (2015), Amuro Ray

=== Original net animation (ONA) ===
- Baki (2018–20), Narrator
- Baki Hanma (2021), Narrator

=== Video games ===
- Super Robot Wars series, Amuro Ray, Hiroshi Shiba, Ribbons Almark, Mr. Zone
- SD Gundam G Generation series, Amuro Ray, Ribbons Almark
- Super Dodge Ball (1994), Kenji
- Sailor Moon games (1994), Tuxedo Mask
- Overdrivin' DX (1996), vehicle commentary narration
- BS Super Mario USA Power Challenge (1996), Mario
- Excitebike: Bun Bun Mario Battle Stadium (1997), Mario
- BS Super Mario Collection (1997), Mario
- Cyberbots: Full Metal Madness (1997), Jin Saotome
- Sega Rally 2 (1998), narration
- Menkyo wo Torō! (2000), Yūichi Amano
- Kessen II (2001), Liu Bei
- Mobile Suit Gundam: Federation vs. Zeon (2001), Amuro Ray
- Mobile Suit Gundam Z: AEUG vs. Titans (2003), Amuro Ray
- Mobile Suit Gundam: Gundam vs. Zeta Gundam (2004), Amuro Ray
- Another Century's Episode (2005), Amuro Ray
- Ninety-Nine Nights (2006), Dwingvatt
- Ski Jumping Pairs: Reloaded (2006)
- Dragon Shadow Spell (2007), Suihi
- Dynasty Warriors: Gundam series, Amuro Ray, Ribbons Almark
- Sands of Destruction (2008), Taupy Toplan
- Mobile Suit Gundam: Gundam vs. Gundam (2008), Amuro Ray
- Mobile Suit Gundam: Gundam vs. Gundam Next (2009), Amuro Ray, Ribbons Almark
- Kamen Rider: Climax Heroes (2009), theme song performer
- Mobile Suit Gundam: Extreme Vs. (2010), Amuro Ray
- Saint Seiya Omega Ultimate Cosmo (2012), Pegasus Seiya
- Mobile Suit Gundam: Extreme Vs. Full Boost (2014), Amuro Ray, Ribbons Almark
- Xenoblade Chronicles 2 (2017), Godfrey
- SD Gundam Battle Alliance (2022), Amuro Ray

=== Live action ===
- Tokyo Defense Command: The Guardman (????), episode 90, ransom delivery boy
- Pussy Soup (2008), William Thomas Jefferson III (voice)

=== Tokusatsu ===
- UFO Daisensou: Tatakae! Red Tiger Episodes 1-4, voice of Red Tiger
- GoGo Sentai Boukenger vs. Super Sentai, voice of Aka Red/Gao Red/Magi Red
- Kaizoku Sentai Gokaiger, voice of Aka Red
- Unofficial Sentai Akibaranger Season Tsuu Episode 12, voice of unofficial Giant God Prism Ace

=== Radio drama ===
- Nissan A, Abe Reiji ~ beyond the average ~, Reiji Amuro

=== Dubbing roles ===
==== Live-action ====
- Yuen Biao
  - The Young Master (2014 Blu-ray edition), Sang Kung's son / Fourth Brother
  - Project A (2011 Wowow edition), Inspector Hong Tin-Tsu
  - Zu Warriors from the Magic Mountain (1992 TBS edition), Di Ming Qi / Dik Ming Kei
  - Wheels on Meals, David
  - Millionaires Express, Fire Chief Tsao Cheuk Kin
  - Mr. Vampire II, Yen
  - Dragons Forever, Tung Te-Biao / Timothy
  - Licence to Steal, Swordsman
  - Kickboxer, Lau Zhai
  - The Hero of Swallow, Li San
  - The Seven Heroes of Shaolin
  - Enter the Phoenix, Georgie Hung's father
  - Rob-B-Hood, Inspector Steve Mok
  - Tai Chi Hero, Li Qiankun
  - The Bodyguard, Cop
- Bull, Benjamin "Benny" Colón (Freddy Rodriguez)
- Casablanca (New Era Movies edition), Victor Laszlo (Paul Henreid)
- Couple or Trouble, Billy Park (Kim Sung-min)
- Disciples of the 36th Chamber, Fong Sai-Yuk (Hsiao Ho)
- The Goonies (1988 TBS edition), Brandon "Brand" Walsh (Josh Brolin)
- The Hunter (1982 Fuji TV edition), Tommy Price (LeVar Burton)
- The Karate Kid Part II, Daniel LaRusso (Ralph Macchio)
- Memphis Belle, Richard "Rascal" Moore (Sean Astin)
- Method Man, Shao Lung (Peter Chen Lau)
- My Darling Clementine (1969 TV Asashi edition), James Earp (Don Garner)
- Pacific Rim, Dr. Newton Geiszler (Charlie Day)
- Pacific Rim Uprising, Dr. Newton Geiszler (Charlie Day)
- Rio Bravo (1973 TV Asashi edition), Colorado Ryan (Ricky Nelson)
- Superman (1983 TV Asashi edition), Jimmy Olsen (Marc McClure)
- Superman II (1984 TV Asashi edition), Jimmy Olsen (Marc McClure)
- Superman III (1985 TV Asashi edition), Jimmy Olsen (Marc McClure)
- West Side Story (1979 TBS edition), Action (Tony Mordente)

==== Animation ====
- Sinbad Jr. and His Magic Belt, Sinbad Jr.

== Awards ==
Year	Award	Category	Notable work	Result
2019	13th Seiyu Awards	Best Supporting Actor	Detective Conan: Zero the Enforcer	Won
