= Maeterlinck's Blue Bird: Tyltyl and Mytyl's Adventurous Journey =

Japanese anime television series

- Cover art from the DVD release of the series

メーテルリンクの青い鳥 チルチルミチルの冒険旅行 (Maeterlinck no Aoi Tori: Tyltyl Mytyl no Bōken Ryokō)
- Genre: Adventure, Fantasy, Drama, Romance, Family
- Anime television series
- Directed by: Hiroshi Sasagawa
- Produced by: Tetsuhisa Yamada
- Written by: Keisuke Fujikawa; Maru Tamura
- Music by: Hiroshi Miyagawa
- Studio: Academy Production
- Original network: FNS (Fuji TV)
- Original run: January 9, 1980 – July 9, 1980
- Episodes: 26

Maeterlinck's Blue Bird: Tyltyl and Mytyl's Adventurous Journey (メーテルリンクの青い鳥 チルチルミチルの冒険旅行, Mēterurinku no Aoi Tori: Chiruchiru Michiru no Bōken Ryokō) is a 1980 Japanese animated television series directed by Hiroshi Sasagawa, with character designs from Leiji Matsumoto. It is based on the 1908 play by Maurice Maeterlinck. The series was 26-episodes long when aired on Japanese television. The series was made in Japan between 1978 and 1979.

== Plot ==
Set in a German-speaking country in the 1970s, the series is about a 12-year-old girl called Mytyl and her 13-year-old brother Tyltyl seeking happiness, represented by The Blue Bird of Happiness, aided by the good fairy Bérylune. They are accompanied on their journey by their cat and dog, Tylette and Tylo, who are given anthropomorphic forms and the ability to talk by Bérylune.

== Characters ==
- Tyltyl (voiced by Toru Furuya)
- Mytyl (voiced by Mami Koyama)
- Tylô (Tyrol) (the dog) (voiced by Ichiro Nagai)
- Tylette (Shanet) (the cat) (voiced by Fuyumi Shiraishi)
- Berylune (the fairy) (voiced by Fusako Amachi)
- Queen of the Night (voiced by Akihiro Miwa)
- Tyltyl and Mytyl's parents (voiced by Koji Yada (father), Miyoko Shoji (ep 1) and Mari Okamoto (mother))
- Water (voiced by Yoko Asagami)
- Fire (voiced by Kenichi Ogata)
- Time (voiced by Koji Yada)
- Bread (voiced by Toshio Furukawa)
- Milk (voiced by Masako Nozawa)
- Sugar (voiced by Tomiko Suzuki)
- Light (voiced by Mari Okamoto)

== Production crew ==
Producer / Planning: Yoshinobu Nishizaki
Chief Director: Hiroshi Sasagawa
Script: Keisuke Fujikawa, Maru Tamura
Original Character Design: Leiji Matsumoto
Animation Character Design and Supervising Animation Director: Toyoo Ashida
Assistant Animation Director: Yoshiyuki Hane
Art Director: Kazue Ito
Sound Director: Atsumi Tashiro, Yasunori Honda
Music: Hiroshi Miyagawa
Production: Toei Animation (uncredited), Office Academy, Fuji TV

== Episodes ==
1. One warm evening, a visitor (January 9, 1980)
2. Sing! Dance! The merry fairies (January 16, 1980)
3. The forest of darkness is full of mysteries (January 23, 1980)
4. Guardian of the dark, queen of the night (January 30, 1980)
5. Good evening, ghost (February 6, 1980)
6. The birds who grasped freedom (February 13, 1980)
7. Welcome to the land of sickness (February 20, 1980)
8. The land where time has stopped (February 27, 1980)
9. A happiness a little too full of itself (March 5, 1980)
10. Pleased to meet you, motherly love (March 12, 1980)
11. Secret of the palace of the night (March 19, 1980)
12. Desert with no oasis (March 26, 1980)
13. Mechanical blue bird (April 9, 1980)
14. Invitation to the graveyard (April 16, 1980)
15. Revolt of the animals!! (April 23, 1980)
16. Children who are yet to be born (April 30, 1980)
17. I'm now being born... (May 7, 1980)
18. The land of gold is full of dreams! (May 14, 1980)
19. Giant of the isle of topsy-turvy (May 21, 1980)
20. Deep sea is the gathering place of demons (May 28, 1980)
21. Devil-inhabited mansion (June 4, 1980)
22. Face-off against the queen of the night (June 11, 1980)
23. Fight the beast! Mother's life in the balance (June 18, 1980)
24. Break through the demon's trap (June 25, 1980)
25. Queen of night, dead at dawn (July 2, 1980)
26. Where are you going, blue bird? (July 9, 1980)

== Music ==
Opening song

- Shiawase no Babira Torarira / "Babyla Tolarilla of Happiness"

Lyrics by: Michio Yamagami
Composition and arrangement by: Hiroshi Miyagawa
Song by: Midori Fukuhara
Ending song

- Mado Akari / "Window Lights"

Lyrics by: Michio Yamagami
Composition and arrangement by: Hiroshi Miyagawa
Song by: Hideki Osuga
Insert songs

- 1. Ima Hoshi Mono wa Ai / "What I Want Now is Love"

Lyrics: Michio Yamagami
Composition and arrangement: Hiroshi Miyagawa
Performance: Midori Fukuhara

- 2. Obake no Fugue / "Haunted Fugue"

Lyrics: Michio Yamagami
Composition and arrangement: Hiroshi Miyagawa
Performance: Fusako Amachi

- 3. Yoseitachi no Fantasy / "Fairies Fantasy"

Lyrics: Michio Yamagami
Composition and arrangement: Hiroshi Miyagawa
Performance: Midori Fukuhara and Fusako Amachi

- 4. Yoru no Joo / "Queen of the Night"

Lyrics: Michio Yamagami
Composition and arrangement: Hiroshi Miyagawa
Performance: Akihiro Miwa

- 5. Jumon no Uta (Babira Torarira) / "Spell Song (Babyla Tolarilla)"

Lyrics: Michio Yamagami
Composition and arrangement: Hiroshi Miyagawa
Performance: Fusako Amachi

- 6. Ano Hi no You Ni / "Like That Day"

Lyrics: Michio Yamagami
Composition and arrangement: Hiroshi Miyagawa
Performance: Fusako Amachi

- 7. Ryukan no Matsuri / "Flu Festival"

Lyrics: Michio Yamagami
Composition and arrangement: Hiroshi Miyagawa
Performance: La Ronde

- 8. Mada Awanai Hito no Tame Ni / "For Those Who Haven't Met Yet"

Lyrics: Michio Yamagami
Composition and arrangement: Hiroshi Miyagawa
Performance: Hideki Osuga

- 9. Shiawase Party / "Happiness Party"

Lyrics: Michio Yamagami
Composition and arrangement: Hiroshi Miyagawa
Performance: La Ronde

- 10. Wasurenbo no Kashi no Ki / "Forgotten Oak Tree"

Lyrics: Michio Yamagami
Composition and arrangement: Hiroshi Miyagawa
Performance: Junpei Takiguchi
