= Hiroshi Ōtake =

Japanese actor (1932–2022)

- 大竹 宏
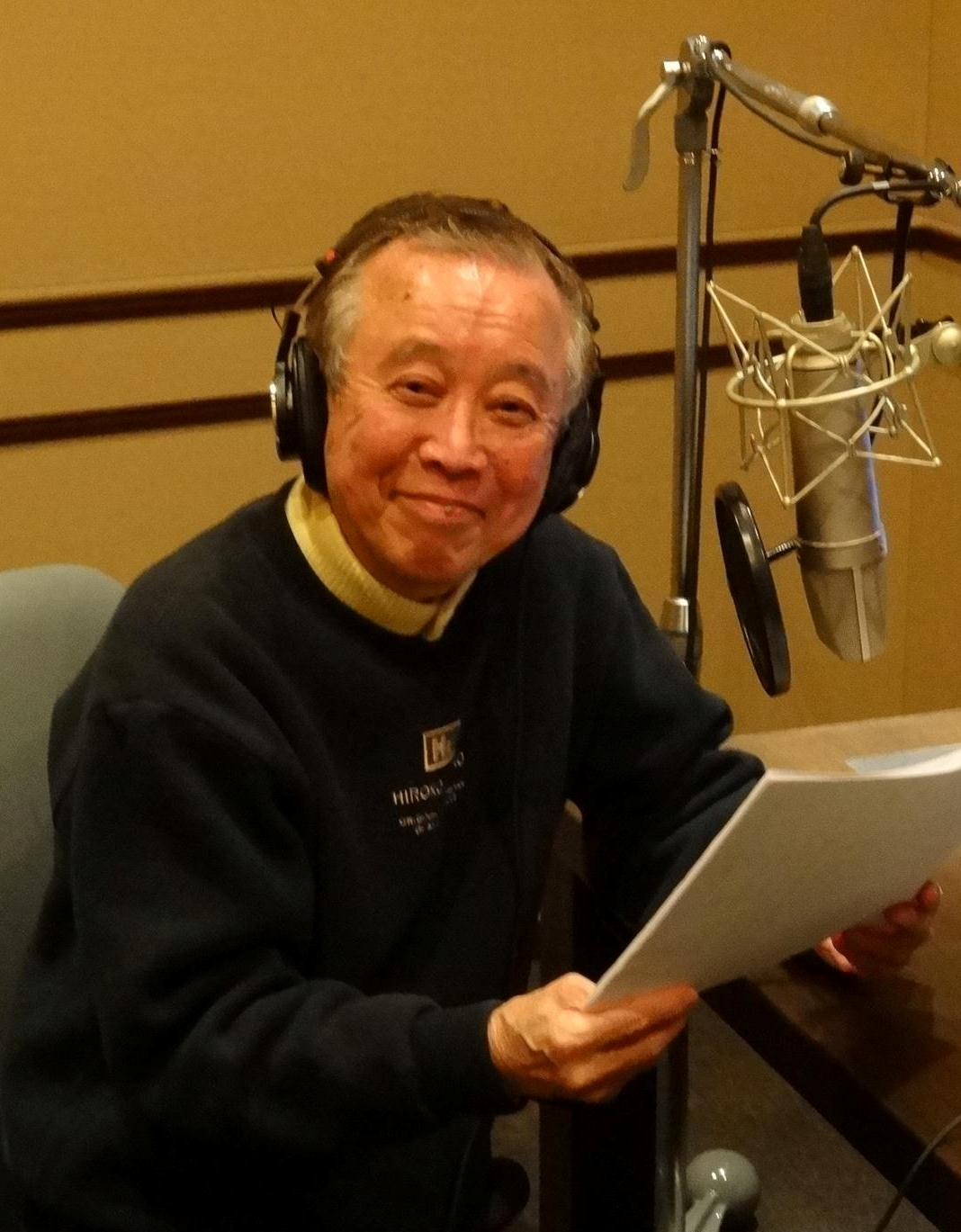
- Born: March 14, 1932; Kanagawa Prefecture, Japan
- Died: August 1, 2022 (aged 90)
- Occupations: Actor; voice actor
- Years active: 1956–2022
- Agent: 81 Produce

Hiroshi Ōtake (Japanese: 大竹 宏, Hepburn: Ōtake Hiroshi; March 14, 1932 – August 1, 2022) was a Japanese actor and voice actor who was affiliated with 81 Produce.

He is best known for his roles as Nyarome in Mōretsu Atarō, Daisho in Himitsu no Akko-chan, Boss in Mazinger Z, Perman 2 (Booby) in Perman, King Nikochan in Dr. Slump, and Buta Gorilla in Kiteretsu Daihyakka.

== Death ==
Ōtake died of acute heart failure on August 1, 2022, at the age of 90.

== Voice roles ==
=== Cinematic animation ===
- Akira (Nezu)
- Jack and the Witch (Fox)
- Little Nemo: Adventures in Slumberland (Oompa)
- Neo Tokyo (444–1)
- Robin Hood (Otto)
- Little Witch Academia: The Enchanted Parade (Mayor)

=== Television animation ===
- Kaibutsu-kun (Dracula)
- Kaibutsu-kun (TV) 2 (Bem)
- Kinnikuman (Nakano-san [eps. 50–58])
- Kiteretsu Daihyakka (Buta Gorilla, Ben)
- The Kabocha Wine (Monta Akai)
- Space Pirate Captain Harlock (Yattaran)
- Cyborg 009 (Albert Heinrich/004)
- Tatakae!! Ramenman (Janku)
- Doraemon (NTV anime) (Unknown role)
- Dokaben (Daigorō Unryū)
- Dr. Slump and Arale-chan (King Nikochan, Tsuruten Tsun)
- Dragon Ball (Carrot Master, Suke-san)
- Dragon Quest (Zanack)
- Police Academy: The Animated Series (Thomas 'House' Conklin)
- Pāman (Pāman 2 (Booby))
- Majokko Megu-chan (Papa Kanzaki, Crow, Boss)
- Bikkuriman (Black Zeus)
- Pani Poni Dash (Jijii)
- Himitsu no Akko-chan (original 1969 series) (Daisho)
- Hunter × Hunter (2011) (Zeno Zoldyck)
- Pokémon (Satoshi's Okorizaru, Hippie, Dr. Midorikawa)
- Mazinger Z (Boss)
- Maison Ikkoku (Saotome)
- Mōretsu Atarō (Nyarome)
- Maeterlinck's Blue Bird: Tyltyl and Mytyl's Adventurous Journey (Spirit of the Water)
- Yume Senshi Wingman (Doctor Anbaransu)
- Wakusei Robo Danguard A (Banta)
- Wansa-kun (Herahera)
- Majokko Tickle (Tontaro)
- Death Note (Roger Ruvie)
- Hustle Punch (Black)

=== Tokusatsu ===
- Robot Detective (Hikooman (ep. 7), Reitooman (ep. 18))
- Akumaizer 3 (Frangen (ep. 27))
- Chōriki Sentai Ohranger (Bara Clothes (ep. 23))
- Gekisō Sentai Carranger (President Gynamo)
- Gekisō Sentai Carranger vs. Ohranger (President Gynamo)
- Seijū Sentai Gingaman (Sutoijii (ep. 10))

=== Video games ===
- Asura's Wrath (The Golden Spider)
- Crash Bandicoot Gatchanko World (Ebeneezer Von Clutch) (Japanese dub)

=== Dubbing roles ===
- Charlie and the Chocolate Factory (2008 NTV edition) (Grandpa George (David Morris))
- The Empire Strikes Back (1980 Movie theater edition) (Major Bren Derlin (John Ratzenberger))

== Awards ==
| Year | Award | Category | Result |
|---|---|---|---|
| 2015 | Tokyo Anime Award Festival 2015 | Merit Award | Won |
| 2015 | 9th Seiyu Awards | Merit Award | Won |
