= Yoku Shioya =

Japanese actor and voice actor (born 1958)

- 塩屋 翼
- Born: Tsubasa Shioya; June 24, 1958 (age 68); Kagoshima Prefecture, Japan
- Occupations: Actor; voice actor
- Years active: 1966–present
- Agent: Raccoon Dog
- Relatives: Kōzō Shioya (brother)

Yoku Shioya (塩屋 翼, Shioya Yoku; born June 24, 1958) is a Japanese actor and voice actor affiliated with Raccoon Dog.

He made his debut in Triton of the Sea (1972). He has also done some voice directing in anime, such as Basilisk: The Kouga Ninja Scrolls.

His notable voice roles include Ryota Miyagi in Slam Dunk and Will A. Zeppeli in JoJo's Bizarre Adventure. His real name is Tsubasa Shioya (written with the same kanji) and his older brother was voice actor Kōzō Shioya.

== Filmography ==
=== Television animation ===
- Triton of the Sea (1972) (Triton)
- Science Ninja Team Gatchaman (1972) (Jinpei the Swallow)
- Space Runaway Ideon (1980) (Cosmo Yuki)
- Ashita no Joe 2 (1981) (Jirō Shioya)
- Star Musketeer Bismark (1984) (Shinji Hikari)
- Saint Seiya (1986) (Siren Sorento)
- Transformers: Super-God Masterforce (1988) (Buster)
- Kariage-kun (1989) (Kariage-kun)
- Transformers: Victory (1989) (Hellbat)
- Magical Taruruto-kun (1990) (Jabao Jaba)
- Goldfish Warning! (1991) (Syuichi Kitada)
- Nangoku Shōnen Papuwa-kun (1992) (Gionkamen Arashiyama)
- Sailor Moon (1993) (Misha) (ep. 39)
- Slam Dunk (1994–96) (Ryota Miyagi)
- Rurouni Kenshin (1996) (Dr. Oguni Gensai)
- Cowboy Bebop (1999) (Miles)
- JoJo's Bizarre Adventure: Phantom Blood (2012) (Will A. Zeppeli)
- Kirakira PreCure a la Mode (2017) (Noir)
- Xuan Yuan Sword Luminary (2018) (An Ce)
- Blue Miburo (2025) (Ryōken)

=== Theatrical animation ===
- Mobile Suit Gundam I (1981) (Marker Clan)
- The Ideon: A Contact (1982) (Cosmo Yuuki)
- The Ideon: Be Invoked (1982) (Cosmo Yuuki)
- Doraemon: Nobita's Little Star Wars (1985) (Freedom Alliance member)
- Gargara (1989) (Rin)
- Mobile Suit Gundam F91 (1991) (Birgit Pirjo)
- Slam Dunk: Shohoku's Greatest Challenge! (1995) (Ryota Miyagi)
- Slam Dunk: Howling Basketman Spirit!! (1995) (Ryota Miyagi)
- Perfect Blue (1998) (Takao Shibuya)

=== OVAs ===
- Legend of the Galactic Heroes (1989) (Graf Alfred von Lansberg)
- Mobile Suit Gundam 0083: Stardust Memory (1991) (Nick Orville)

=== Tokusatsu ===
- Akuma-kun (1966) (ep. 13)
- Spectreman (1971) (Tamio, Jun Hayata) (ep. 34 - 35 (Tamio), 59 - 60(Jun Hayata))
- Silver Kamen Giant (1972) (boy) (ep. 23)
- Barom-1 (1972) (Tetsuya, Tooru) (ep. 14 (Tetsuya), 35 (Tooru))
- Iron King (1973) (boy) (ep. 24)
- Seijuu Sentai Gingaman (1998) (Gaaragaara) (ep. 31)
- Uchu Sentai Kyuranger (2017) (Ikargen) (ep. 6 - 9, 11 - 12)

=== Video games ===
- Super Robot Wars Alpha (2000) (Birgit Pirjo)
- Tatsunoko Fight (2000) (Karochi Taiki, Jinpei)
- Super Robot Wars Alpha 2 (2003) (Birgit Pirjo)
- Super Robot Wars Alpha 3 (2005) (Cosmo Yuuki)
- Super Robot Wars Z2: Destruction Chapter (2011) (Akira Kiso)
- Super Robot Wars Z2: Rebirth Chapter (2012) (Akira Kiso)
- JoJo's Bizarre Adventure: All Star Battle (2013) (Will A. Zeppeli)
- Saint Seiya: Brave Soldiers (2013) (Siren Sorrento)
- Super Robot Wars Z3: Hell Chapter (2014) (Akira Kiso)
- Tales of Zestiria (2015) (Neif)
- Super Robot Wars Z3: Heaven Chapter (2015) (Akira Kiso)
- Saint Seiya: Soldiers' Soul (2015) (Siren Sorrento)
- JoJo's Bizarre Adventure: Eyes of Heaven (2015) (Will A. Zeppeli)
- Triangle Strategy (2022) (Archibald Genoe)
- JoJo's Bizarre Adventure: All Star Battle R (2022) (Will A. Zeppeli)

=== Dubbing ===
==== Animation film ====
- An Extremely Goofy Movie (Bobby)

==== Animation television ====
- Johnny Test (Dukey)
- Peanuts (Linus Van Pelt)
- RWBY (Tyrian Callows)
- Teenage Mutant Ninja Turtles (Donatello)
- Transformers: Prime (Fast Willy)

==== Live-action film ====
- The Burning (1985 Fuji TV edition) (Alfred (Brian Backer))
- Christine (1990 TV Asahi edition) (Arnold "Arnie" Cunningham (Keith Gordon))
- Encino Man (Stanley "Stoney" Brown (Pauly Shore))
- Evilspeak (Stanley Coopersmith (Clint Howard))
- Executive Decision (Dennis Cahill (Oliver Platt))
- Lucky Stars Go Places (Top Dog (Alan Tam))
- Mr. Vampire (Chau-sang (Chin Siu-ho))
- Murmur of the Heart (Laurent Chevalier (Benoît Ferreux))
- Red Dawn (Danny (Brad Savage))

==== Live action television ====
- CHiPs (Bruce Nelson (Bruce Penhall))
- The Greatest American Hero (Paco Rodriguez (Don Cervantes))
