= List of animated television series of 1978 =

A list of animated television series first aired in 1978.

Animated television series first aired in 1978
Title	Episodes	Country	Year	Notes	Technique
The Adventures of the Little Prince	39	Japan	1978–79	Japanese title: Hoshi no Ojisama Puchi Puransu	Anime
The All New Popeye Hour	56	United States	1978–83	Spin-off of Popeye	Traditional
The All-New Pink Panther Show	13	United States	1978–79		Traditional
Battle of the Planets	85	United States; Japan	1978–80		Traditional
Buford and the Galloping Ghost	13	United States	1978	Spin-off of Yogi's Space Race	Traditional
The Buford Files	13	United States	1978	Segment on Buford and the Galloping Ghost.	Traditional
Captain Future	53	Japan	1978–79		Anime
Captain Kremmen		United Kingdom	1978–81		Traditional
Challenge of the Superfriends	16	United States	1978		Traditional
Crazylegs Crane	16	United States	1978		Traditional
Dinky Dog	32	United States	1978–79	The All New Popeye Hour Segment	Traditional
Fabulous Funnies	13	United States	1978		Traditional
Fangface	24	United States	1978–80		Traditional
The Freedom Force	5	United States	1978	Tarzan and the Super 7 segment	Traditional
Future Boy Conan	26	Japan	1978		Anime
Galaxy Express 999	113	Japan	1978–81		Anime
Galaxy Goof-Ups	13	United States	1978–79	Yogi's Space Race segment	Traditional
The Galloping Ghost	13	United States	1978	Segment on Buford and the Galloping Ghost.	Traditional
Gatchaman II	52	Japan	1978–79		Anime
Godzilla	26	United States	1978–79	Spin-off of Godzilla	Traditional
Haikara-San: Here Comes Miss Modern	42	Japan	1978–79	Known as Mademoiselle Anne in Italy, Marc et Marie in France	Anime
Ikkyū-san	26	Japan	1978		Anime
Invincible Steel Man Daitarn 3	40	Japan	1978–79		Anime
Jana of the Jungle	13	United States	1978		Traditional
Kagee Aesop Monogatari	26	Japan	1978		Anime
Majokko Tickle	45	Japan	1978–79		Anime
Manga Hajimete Monogatari	305	Japan	1978–84		Anime
Manga Kodomo Bunko	51	Japan	1978–79		Anime
Manta and Moray	7	United States	1978	Tarzan and the Super 7 segment	Traditional
Märchen der Völker	39	West Germany	1978		Traditional
The Metric Marvels	7	United States	1978–79		Traditional
The Moomins	78	Polish People's Republic; Austria; West Germany	1978–82		Traditional
The New Fantastic Four	13	United States	1978		Traditional
Nick Knatterton	15	West Germany	1978–80		Traditional
Once Upon a Time... Man	26	France	1978–79		Traditional
Papivole	52	Belgium; France	1978		Cut-Out
Pink Lady Monogatari: Eiko no Tenshitachi	35	Japan	1978–79		Anime
Quaq Quao	26	Italy	1978		Stop-Motion
Shin Ace o Nerae!	25	Japan	1978–79		Anime
Space Battleship Yamato II	26	Japan	1978–79	AKA Star Blazers: The Comet Empire (USA)	Anime
Space Pirate Captain Harlock	42	Japan	1978–79		Anime
Starzinger	73	Japan	1978–79		Anime
The Story of Perrine	53	Japan	1978		Anime
Superstretch and Microwoman	11	United States	1978	Tarzan and the Super 7 Segment	Traditional
Tarzan and the Super 7	33	United States	1978–80	Also live-action.	Traditional
Tōshō Daimos	44	Japan	1978–79		Anime
Treasure Island	26	Japan	1978–79		Anime
Uchū Majin Daikengo	26	Japan	1978–79		Anime
Ute, Schnute, Kasimir	3500	West Germany	1978		Traditional
Wattoo Wattoo Super Bird	60	France	1978		Traditional
Web Woman	10	United States	1978	Tarzan and the Super 7 Segment	Traditional
Yogi's Space Race	13	United States	1978		Traditional

== See also ==
- List of animated feature films of 1978
- List of Japanese animation television series of 1978
