= 1978 in animation =

Events in 1978 in animation.

== Events ==
=== February ===
- February 23: The Peanuts TV special What a Nightmare, Charlie Brown! premieres on CBS.

=== March ===
- March 1: Karel Zeman's Krabat – The Sorcerer's Apprentice premieres.
- March 11: Masami Hata's Chirin no Suzu (Ringing Bell) premieres, the first animated feature produced by Sanrio to be aimed more at young adults, and featuring a remarkable tone shift in the second half of the film.
- March 27: Jannik Hastrup's Danish animated feature The Thralls is first released in theaters.

=== April ===
- April 2: The first episode of Starzinger premieres.
- April 3: 50th Academy Awards: The Sand Castle by Co Hoedeman wins the Academy Award for Best Animated Short.
- April 4: The first episode of Hayao Miyazaki's Future Boy Conan airs.

=== May ===
- May 12: Hisayuki Toriumi's Science Ninja Team Gatchaman: The Movie premieres.
- May 16–30: Jean-François Laguionie's Rowing Across the Atlantic premieres during the 1978 Cannes Film Festival. It will later win a Short Film Palme d'Or.

=== June ===
- June 3: The first episode of Haikara-San: Here Comes Miss Modern airs.
- June 16: The film Grease premieres which has an animated opening sequence created by John David Wilson.
- June 23: Lionel Jeffries' The Water Babies which combines animation and live-action, is first released.

=== July ===
- July 6: The first episode of Wattoo Wattoo Super Bird airs.
- July 14: Leiji Matsumoto's Farewell to Space Battleship Yamato is first released.

=== September ===
- The first episode of Quaq Quao airs.
- September 30: The first episode of Il était une fois... l'Homme (Once Upon a Time... Man), the first series in the Once Upon a Time... franchise by Albert Barillé, airs.

=== October ===
- October 19: Martin Rosen's animated feature film, Watership Down, an adaptation of Richard Adams' novel Watership Down, premieres.
- October 22: Nelvana releases its first animated Halloween special, The Devil and Daniel Mouse.
- October 24: René Goscinny and Morris' second animated feature film based on the Lucky Luke series, La Ballade des Dalton, premieres in France.

=== November ===
- November 2: Takashi Masunaga's anthology film Metamorphoses premieres, a retelling of Metamorphoses by Roman poet Ovid set to music by Joan Baez and Mick Jagger.
- November 6: Eunice Macaulay and John Weldon's Livraison Spéciale (Special Delivery) is first released.
- November 13: To celebrate the character's 50th anniversary, Mickey Mouse receives a star at the Hollywood Walk of Fame. He is the first animated character and general fictional character to receive this honor.
- November 15: Ralph Bakshi releases his animated film adaptation of the Ring trilogy by J. R. R. Tolkien: The Lord of the Rings.

=== December ===
- December 16:
  - Soji Yoshikawa's The Mystery of Mamo is first released, the first animated film in the Lupin III franchise.
  - Don Bluth's The Small One is first released, produced by Walt Disney Productions.

== Specific date unknown ==
- Ishu Patel's animated short Afterlife premieres.
- Robert Awad, André Leduc and Tim Reid's L'Affaire Bronswik (The Bronswik Affair) premieres, an animated mockumentary.
- Yefim Gamburg's Ograblenie po... (Robbery Style...) premieres.
- Janet Perlman and Derek Lamb's Why Me? premieres.

== Films released ==
- January 5 - Gold Wing 123 (South Korea)
- January 23 - Kongjui & Patchui (South Korea)
- March 10 - The Ballad of the Daltons (France)
- March 11 - Ringing Bell (Japan)
- March 18 - Thumbelina (Japan)
- March 27 - The Thralls (Denmark)
- April - Proszę słonia (Poland)
- May 3 - Metamorphoses (Japan and United States)
- May 12 - Science Ninja Team Gatchaman: The Movie (Japan)
- May 15 - Wilhelm Busch – Die Trickfilm-Parade: Max und Moritz und andere Streiche (Germany)
- June 23 - The Water Babies (United Kingdom)
- June 30 - Mickey Mouse Jubilee Show (United States)
- July 14 - Farewell to Space Battleship Yamato: Warriors of Love (Japan)
- July 23 - 77 Group's Secret (South Korea)
- July 26 - Robot Taekwon V vs. Golden Wings Showdown (South Korea)
- July 31 - Run, Wonder Princess! (South Korea)
- August 19 - The Phoenix (Japan)
- August 27 - One Million-Year Trip: Bander Book (Japan)
- September 23 - King Fang (Japan)
- October 19 - Watership Down (United Kingdom and United States)
- October 28 - Black Beauty (United States)
- November 2 - Twelve Days of Christmas (United States)
- November 4 - Los Supersabios (Mexico)
- November 15 - The Lord of the Rings (United States)
- November 25 - Not Everything that Flies is a Bird (Germany and Yugoslavia)
- December 7 - Dallyeora Majingga X (South Korea)
- December 16 - Lupin III: The Mystery of Mamo (Japan)
- December 23 - The Stingiest Man in Town (United States and Japan)
- December 26 - The Talking Parcel (United Kingdom)
- December 31 - Captain Future: The Great Race in the Solar System (Japan)
- Specific date unknown:
  - Fantasia's Attic (Spain)
  - Ferda the Ant. How Ferda Lived in the World and Stories about his Friend Little Back (Czechoslovakia and Soviet Union)
  - The Magic Flute (Italy and Australia)
  - Xigua pao (China)

== Television series ==
- January 1 - Perrine Monogatari debuts on Fuji TV and Sat.1.
- March 6 - Majokko Tickle debuts on TV Asahi.
- March 14 - Space Pirate Captain Harlock debuts on TV Asahi.
- April 1 - Tosho Daimos debuts on TV Asahi.
- April 2 - Starzinger debuts on Fuji TV.
- April 4 - Future Boy Conan debuts on NHK General TV.
- April 10 - Highschool Baseball Ninja debuts on Fuji TV.
- June 3:
  - Haikara-san ga Tōru debuts on TV Asahi.
  - Invincible Steel Man Daitarn 3 debuts on Nagoya TV.
- July 4 - The Adventures of The Little Prince debuts on TV Asahi.
- July 6 - Wattoo Wattoo Super Bird debuts on A2.
- September - Quaq Quao debuts in syndication.
- September 9:
  - Buford and the Galloping Ghost debuts on NBC.
  - Challenge of the Super Friends and Fangface debut on ABC.
  - Crazylegs Crane, Dinky Dog, Manta and Moray, Superstretch and Microwoman, Tarzan and the Super 7, The All-New Popeye Hour, The Freedom Force, and Web Woman debut on CBS.
  - Fabulous Funnies, Galaxy Goof-Ups, The Godzilla Power Hour, Jana of the Jungle, The Buford Files, The Galloping Ghost, The New Fantastic Four, and Yogi's Space Race debut on NBC.
- September 12 - Battle of the Planets debuts in syndication.
- September 14 - Galaxy Express 999 debuts on Fuji TV.
- September 30 - Once Upon a Time... Man debuts on FR3.
- October 1 - Gatchaman II debuts on Fuji TV.
- October 8 - Treasure Island debuts on NTV.
- October 14 - Space Battleship Yamato 2 debuts on Yomiuri TV.
- November 7 - Captain Future debuts on NHK General TV.

== Births ==
=== January ===
- January 1: Jose Garibaldi, American animator (Good Vibes, Electric City, The Epic Tales of Captain Underpants, The Lego Movie 2: The Second Part), illustrator and character designer (Teenage Mutant Ninja Turtles).
- January 8: Scott Whyte, American actor (voice of Uncle Andrew and Porcupunk in Power Players, Sparrow in the Miraculous: Tales of Ladybug & Cat Noir episode "Miraculous World: New York – United Heroez", Dryden Vos in Star Wars: Maul – Shadow Lord).
- January 9: AJ McLean, American musician and member of the Backstreet Boys (voice of Kuchimba in The Lion Guard episode "The Underground Adventure", himself in the Arthur episode "Arthur, It's Only Rock and Roll" and the Static Shock episode "Duped").
- January 24: Kristen Schaal, American actress and comedian (voice of Mabel Pines in Gravity Falls, Louise Belcher in Bob's Burgers, Victoria Best in WordGirl, Trixie in Toy Story 3 and Toy Story 4, Sarah Lynn in BoJack Horseman, Barb in Cloudy with a Chance of Meatballs 2, Shannon in Despicable Me 2, Bella the Belhop in the Amphibia episode The Plantars Check In, Jake Jr. in Adventure Time, herself in the Scooby-Doo and Guess Who? episode "The Horrible Haunted Hospital of Dr. Phineas Phrag!").
- January 25: Volodymyr Zelenskyy, Ukrainian politician and former actor (dub voice of Paddington Bear in Paddington and Paddington 2).
- January 28:
  - Stephen Farrelly, Irish pro wrestler (voiced himself in Scooby-Doo! and WWE: Curse of the Speed Demon and The Jetsons & WWE: Robo-WrestleMania!).
  - Mark Hildreth, Canadian actor (voice of Milton Dyer in Ninjago, Vert Wheeler in Hot Wheels Battle Force 5, Quicksilver in Wolverine and the X-Men, Pan in Class of the Titans, Thundermutt in Krypto the Superdog, Angel in X-Men: Evolution, Heero Yuy in Mobile Suit Gundam Wing, Sir Gallop and Sir Zeke in King Arthur and the Knights of Justice, Deathlok in the Hulk and the Agents of S.M.A.S.H. episode "Deathlok").

=== February ===
- February 2:
  - Eden Espinosa, American actress (voice of Cassandra in Rapunzel's Tangled Adventure, Queen of Hearts in Alice's Wonderland Bakery).
  - Rich Sommer, American actor (voice of Del Hanlon in Regular Show, Daniel Turner in Elena of Avalor, Keith Nash in Close Enough).
- February 3: Eliza Jane Schneider, American actress, singer, playwright, and dialect coach (portrayed Liza in Beakman's World, voice of various characters in Popzilla, Sweet Older Lady in Foodfight!, Chido's Mom in Sanjay and Craig, Lola in the Johnny Bravo episode "Berry the Butler", Charisse in the King of the Hill episode "I'm with Cupid", Jenny in The Zeta Project episode "The Wrong Morph", Moofy in the Invader Zim episode "The Girl Who Cried Gnome", Martha in the Squirrel Boy episode "Diss and Make Up", Ewok Nerd in The Cleveland Show episode "Hot Cocoa Bang Bang", Baroness von Gunther and Georgette Taylor in the Batman: The Brave and the Bold episode "Scorn of the Star Sapphire!", continued voice of Liane Cartman, Wendy Testaburger, Sheila Broflovski, Shelly Marsh, Sharon Marsh, Mrs. Crabtree, Principal Victoria, and other various characters in South Park).
- February 7: Matt Warburton, American television writer and producer (The Simpsons).
- February 10: Stéphane Nutini, French network and computer technician (Miraculous: Tales of Ladybug & Cat Noir, Iron Man: Armored Adventures) (d. 2024)
- February 20: Jay Hernandez, American actor (voice of Bonnie's Dad in Toy Story 4 and Toy Story 5, himself in the BoJack Horseman episode "A Horse Walks Into a Bar").
- February 21: Nicole Parker, American actress (voice of Penelope Pitstop in Wacky Races, Siobhan in Bunnicula).
- February 26: Paul Beard, American animator (animator for the last three seasons of Blue's Clues, and Blue's Room and Wonder Pets!) (d. 2005),
- February 28: Geoffrey Arend, American actor (voice of Riddler in Batman: Hush, Sean Connery and Christopher Walken in Celebrity Deathmatch, Tony Perotti in the American Dad! episode "Garbage Stan").

=== March ===
- March 1:
  - Donovan Patton, American actor and television host (portrayed Joe in Blue's Clues and Blue's Clues & You!, voice of Daniel in Maya & Miguel, Bot in Team Umizoomi, Mr. Reese in Clarence, Chef Zesty in Creative Galaxy, Catrat in Gabby's Dollhouse, Hector Hare in The Tom and Jerry Show episode "The Tortoise Don't Play Fair", Luster Dock in the Sunny Day episode "Blair's Appointment", additional voices in Monsters University and We Bare Bears).
  - Jensen Ackles, American actor (voice of Batman in the Tomorrowverse, Jason Todd in Batman: Under the Red Hood).
- March 17: Patrick Seitz, American actor (voice of Dio Brando in JoJo's Bizarre Adventure, Enji Todoroki / Endeavor in My Hero Academia, Kunikida Doppo in Bungo Stray Dogs, Kenpachi Zaraki and Isshin Kurosaki in Bleach, Laxus Dreyar in Fairy Tail, Agil in Sword Art Online, Kunzite in the Viz Media dub of Sailor Moon, Thor in Marvel Future Avengers, Etrigan the Demon in Justice League Action, Mumm-Ra and Tygra in ThunderCats Roar).
- March 23: Nicholle Tom, American actress (voice of Supergirl in the DC Animated Universe, Ryce Newton in Beethoven).
- March 25: Tomohisa Shimoyama, Japanese director (Super Shiro) and animator (Fullmetal Alchemist: The Sacred Star of Milos, The Night Is Short, Walk On Girl).

=== April ===
- April 20: C. Raggio IV, American animator (Camp Lazlo, The Marvelous Misadventures of Flapjack), character designer (The Marvelous Misadventures of Flapjack, The Powerpuff Girls, The Mighty B!, Disney Television Animation) and storyboard artist (The Replacements, Illumination, The Angry Birds Movie 2), (d. 2019).
- April 26: Stana Katic, Canadian actress (voice of Lois Lane in Superman: Unbound, Wonder Woman in the Tomorrowverse).

=== May ===
- May 2: Kumail Nanjiani, Pakistani-American actor and comedian (voice of Jay in The Lego Ninjago Movie, Prismo in Adventure Time).
- May 4: Daisuke Ono, Japanese voice actor (voice of Erwin Smith in Attack on Titan, Jotaro Kujo in JoJo's Bizarre Adventure, Sebastian Michaelis in Black Butler, Leon in Pokémon, Japanese dub voice of Nod in Epic, Guy in The Croods, and Prince Gumball in Adventure Time).
- May 10: Kenan Thompson, American actor and comedian (voiced and portrayed the title character in Fat Albert, voice of Greedy Smurf in The Smurfs and The Smurfs 2, Riff in Rock Dog, Bricklebaum in The Grinch, Gus in Wonder Park, Bloodbones in Playmobil: The Movie, Tiny Diamond in the Trolls franchise, Rocky Rhodes in The Mighty B!, Sue Sezno in Sit Down, Shut Up, Ronald in Nature Cat, himself in the Scooby-Doo and Guess Who? episode "Quit Clowning!").
- May 12: Jason Biggs, American actor (voice of Leonardo in the first two seasons of Teenage Mutant Ninja Turtles).
- May 15: David Krumholtz, American actor (voice of Kareem Lavash in Sausage Party, Timo in All Hail King Julien, Cobalt Ferrero in the Star vs. the Forces of Evil episode "Marco Jr.").
- May 22: Ginnifer Goodwin, American actress (voice of Judy Hopps in the Zootopia franchise and Once Upon a Studio, Fawn in Tinker Bell and the Legend of the NeverBeast, Gwen in the Sofia the First episode "Gizmo Gwen", Purple-Haired Mermaid in the SpongeBob SquarePants episode "Welcome to the Bikini Bottom Triangle").
- May 26: Benji Gregory, American actor (voice of Biff Jr. in Back to the Future, Edgar in Once Upon a Forest, Benjamin "Ben" Letterman in Fantastic Max, Andy in the Pound Puppies episode "Pups on the Loose"), (d. 2024).
- May 28: Jake Johnson, American actor and filmmaker (voice of Peter B. Parker/Spider-Man in Spider-Man: Into the Spider-Verse and Spider-Man: Across the Spider-Verse, Barry in The Lego Movie, Grouchy Smurf in Smurfs: The Lost Village, Joel Zadak in Allen Gregory, Mr. Structor in High School USA!, Oxnard in BoJack Horseman, Ben Hopkins in Hoops, Dave in the We Bare Bears episode "The Island").

=== June ===
- June 2: Justin Long, American actor (voice of Alvin Seville in the Alvin and the Chipmunks films, Spyro in Skylanders Academy, Senn in Battle for Terra, Lem Kerlpog in Escape from Planet Earth, Roboto in Masters of the Universe: Revelation).
- June 5: Nick Kroll, American actor, comedian, writer and producer (voice of Stu in The Life & Times of Tim, Andrew LeGustambos in Sit Down, Shut Up, Reuben Grinder in WordGirl, Andy Dick, Student, Dry Cleaner, Costgo Employee and Henry Watkins Jr. in American Dad!, Douche in Sausage Party, Gunter in Sing and Sing 2, Professor Poopypants in Captain Underpants: The First Epic Movie, Mr. Desanto in Bob's Burgers, Sergei in The Secret Life of Pets 2, Uncle Fester in The Addams Family and The Addams Family 2, Scary Carnie in The Bob's Burgers Movie, Ricky in the Family Guy episode "Into Harmony's Way", Lem in The Simpsons episode "Halloween of Horror", Cleb in the SuperMansion episode "Babes in the Wood", Jerry in the Animals episode "Pigeons.", co-creator and voice of Nick Birch, Maury the Hormone Monster, Lola Skumpy, Coach Steve Steve and other various characters in Big Mouth, Rick and Todd in Human Resources).
- June 6:
  - Judith Barsi, American child actress (voice of Ducky in The Land Before Time, Anne-Marie in All Dogs Go to Heaven), (d. 1988).
  - Dave King, American television producer and writer (The Simpsons, Santa Inc.).
- June 7: Bill Hader, American actor and comedian (voice of Fear in Inside Out, Flint Lockwood in Cloudy with a Chance of Meatballs and Cloudy with a Chance of Meatballs 2, Leonard in The Angry Birds Movie and The Angry Birds Movie 2, Spamley in Ralph Breaks the Internet, Guy Gagne in Turbo, the title character in The Cat in the Hat).
- June 12:
  - Jeremy Rowley, American actor (voice of Bunsen in Bunsen Is a Beast, Mayor Webb in Bless the Harts, Gregor in the Mike Tyson Mysteries episode "Kidnapped!").
  - Timothy Simons, American actor and comedian (voice of Drew Pickles in Rugrats, Supersonic Stu in Big Hero 6: The Series, Huginn in Rise of the Teenage Mutant Ninja Turtles, Butcher Boy in Ralph Breaks the Internet).
- June 13: Ethan Embry, American actor (voice of Electro in Spider-Man: The New Animated Series, Melampus in Hercules, Bodhi in The Zeta Project episode "His Maker's Name").
- June 18:
  - Tara Platt, American actress (voice of Ikuko Tsukino in Sailor Moon, Temari in Naruto, Reina in Rave Master, Kali Belladonna in RWBY, Washimi in Aggretsuko, Jennifer Nocturne, Ester, and Subdora in the Ben 10 franchise, Dream Girl in Legion of Super Heroes).
  - Ben Gleib, American actor and comedian (voice of Marshall in Ice Age: Continental Drift, Goya and Dali in The Book of Life, NewsGroup in Jay & Silent Bob's Super Groovy Cartoon Movie!).
- June 19: Zoe Saldaña, American actress (voice of Captain Celaeno in My Little Pony: The Movie, Maya in Maya and the Three, Adelina Fortnight in Missing Link, Maria Posada in The Book of Life).
- June 29: Nicole Scherzinger, American signer, songwriter, dancer, actress, and television personality (voice of Sina in the Moana franchise, Mo's Mother in Ralph Breaks the Internet, Miranda Trese in Trese).

=== July ===
- July 6:
  - Tia Mowry, American actress (voice of Sasha in the Bratz franchise, Lemonjella LaBelle in Detention, Sindy Sauernotes in Fresh Beat Band of Spies).
  - Tamera Mowry, American actress (voice of Orangejella LaBelle in Detention, Emma Squared in The Adventures of Hyperman, Esther in Family Guy).
- July 8: Tony Mines, English animator, writer, director and producer (The Lego Group, co-founder of Spite Your Face Productions), (d. 2022).
- July 19:
  - R.J. Williams, American actor (voice of the title character in Kissyfur, Kit Cloudkicker in TaleSpin, Cavin in season 6 of Adventures of the Gummi Bears).
  - Chiara Zanni, Canadian actress (voice of Alex in Camp Candy, Jubilee in X-Men: Evolution, the title character in Hamtaro, Molly in Oban Star-Racers, Yura of the Hair, the Infant, and Hakudoshi in Inuyasha, Petunia Pig in Baby Looney Tunes, Fiona Munson in Kid vs. Kat, Daring Do in My Little Pony: Friendship Is Magic, Colby in Henry Hugglemonster).

=== August ===
- August 3: Tommy Dewey, American actor, producer, and writer (voice of Stu Pickles in Rugrats).
- August 9: Brad Breeck, American composer and musician (Disney Television Animation).
- August 14: Neil Newbon, English actor (voice of Petra Fortis in Kingsglaive: Final Fantasy XV, Tank Driver in Jackboots on Whitehall).
- August 18: Andy Samberg, American actor and comedian (voice of Johnny in the Hotel Transylvania franchise, Brent McHale in the Cloudy with a Chance of Meatballs franchise, Benedict Arnold in America: The Motion Picture, Dale in Chip 'n Dale: Rescue Rangers, Rip Digman in Digman!, Ben Reilly in Spider-Man: Across the Spider-Verse, Pawbert in Zootopia 2).
- August 21:
  - Christopher Willis, Australian-born English composer (Disney Television Animation).
  - John Disco, Scottish record producer, sound engineer and songwriter (performed the closing theme song from The Powerpuff Girls).
- August 22: James Corden, English actor and comedian (voice of Biggie in the Trolls franchise, Hi-5 in The Emoji Movie, Vernkot in Planet 51, Percy in Smallfoot).
- August 23:
  - Kobe Bryant, American former professional basketball player (wrote and narrated Dear Basketball, voiced himself in The Proud Family episode "One in a Million"), (d. 2020).
  - Andrew Rannells, American actor (voice of Archie Andrews in Archie's Weird Mysteries, Connor in Cubix, Monty and Harley in Pokémon, Alexander Hamilton in Liberty's Kids, Mako Tsunami, Noah Kaiba, Leon von Schroeder, and Leon Wilson in Yu-Gi-Oh! Duel Monsters, Streex and Shrimp Louie in Street Sharks, young Zoro in the 4Kids dub of One Piece, Skye in Sofia the First, Andrei in Welcome to the Wayne, King Peppy in Vampirina, Matthew MacDell in Big Mouth, William Clockwell in Invincible, Aten in Ridley Jones, himself in The Simpsons episode "How Lisa Got Her Marge Back").
- August 25: Kel Mitchell, American actor and comedian (voice of T-Bone in Clifford the Big Red Dog, Dutch in Motorcity, Carlos in The Proud Family episode "Forbidden Date").
- August 28: Rachel Kimsey, American actress (voice of Wonder Woman in Justice League Action and the Scooby-Doo and Guess Who? episode "The Scooby of a Thousand Faces!", Maria Romanova in Justice League: Warworld).
- August 31: Mike Erwin, American actor (voice of Strikemaster Ice in Jackie Chan Adventures, Roy Harper in Teen Titans and the Justice League Unlimited episode "Patriot Act").

=== September ===
- September 4: Wes Bentley, American actor (voice of Niander Wallace in Blade Runner: Black Lotus).
- September 7: Devon Sawa, Canadian actor (voice of Flash Thompson in the Spider-Man: The New Animated Series episode "Flash Memory", additional voices in Action Man).
- September 18: Billy Eichner, American actor (voice of Chef Pig in The Angry Birds Movie, Mr. Ambrose in Bob's Burgers, Walter Bigman in the Green Eggs and Ham episode "Boat", himself in the Family Guy episode "Pawtucket Pete").

=== October ===
- October 4:
  - Dana Davis, American actress and novelist (voice of Claire in Motorcity, Kelly in Star vs. the Forces of Evil, Kit in Craig of the Creek, Lonnie in She-Ra and the Princesses of Power, Jess in Amphibia).
  - Phillip Glasser, American former actor (first voice of Fievel Mousekewitz in the An American Tail franchise).
- October 7: Omar Benson Miller, American actor (voice of Raphael in Rise of the Teenage Mutant Ninja Turtles and Rise of the Teenage Mutant Ninja Turtles: The Movie, Randy Carmichael in Rugrats).
- October 10: Edan Gross, American businessman and former child actor (voice of Flounder in The Little Mermaid, Tyrone Turtle in Tiny Toon Adventures, Christopher Robin in Winnie the Pooh and Christmas Too, Tom Skelton in The Halloween Tree, the title character in Little Dracula).
- October 16: Novie Edwards, Canadian actress (voice of Reanne from Girlstuff/Boystuff, Jackie in Cyberchase, Leshawna in Total Drama, Kira in Iggy Arbuckle, Chef Betty in Rusty Rivets, Lina in Yin Yang Yo!).
- October 20: Dionne Quan, American actress (voice of Shi Shou in The Wild Thornberrys, Kimi Finster in Rugrats, Trixie Tang in The Fairly OddParents, Kodama Twins in the Shorty McShorts' Shorts episode "Dudley and Nestor Do Nothing").
- October 21: Will Estes, American actor (voice of Willy in Once Upon a Forest, Jonny Quest in Jonny's Golden Quest).
- October 26: CM Punk, American professional wrestler and actor (voice of CM Punkrock in The Flintstones & WWE: Stone Age SmackDown!, Zebro Zabrowski in Zootopia 2).

=== November ===
- November 6: Nicole Dubuc, American actress (voice of Iris West in Young Justice, Nuala in Miles from Tomorrowland, Honey in The Rocketeer), and writer (Transformers, My Little Pony: Friendship Is Magic).
- November 12: Sharmeen Obaid-Chinoy, Canadian-Pakistani journalist, filmmaker and political activist (3 Bahadur, Sitara: Let Girls Dream).
- November 16:
  - Vyvan Pham, American actress (voice of Julie Yamamoto in the Ben 10 franchise, Cricket in Generator Rex, Ullu in The Lion Guard, Katana in the Batman: The Brave and the Bold episode "Enter the Outsiders!").
  - Cal Brunker, Canadian animator (Looney Tunes: Back in Action, Cyberchase, Kronk's New Groove), storyboard artist (Blue Sky Studios, Illumination, 9, Spliced, Ratchet & Clank), screenwriter (Arctic Dogs, Bigfoot Family) and film director (Escape from Planet Earth, The Nut Job 2: Nutty by Nature, PAW Patrol: The Movie).
- November 19:
  - Daniel Chong, American animator and producer (Pixar, creator of We Bare Bears).
  - Chad Doreck, American actor (voice of Brad Carbunkle in My Life as a Teenage Robot, Centola in the Rocket Power episode "Reggie's Big (Beach) Break").
- November 30: Gael García Bernal, Mexican actor and producer (voice of Héctor in Coco).

=== December ===
- December 7: Shiri Appleby, American actress (voice of Cynthia in the Batman Beyond episode "Terry's Friend Dates A Robot").
- December 10: Rita Rani Ahuja, American actress and producer (voice of Alexandrite in Steven Universe).
- December 17: Cav Bøgelund, Danish animator and comics artist (Våbenbrødre), (d. 2018).
- December 18: Josh Dallas, American actor (voice of Frantic Pig in Zootopia).
- December 27: Colin Heck, American animator (Film Roman, Futurama, Neighbors from Hell), storyboard artist (Nickelodeon Animation Studio, Harvey Birdman, Attorney at Law, Teen Titans, The Simpsons, Family Guy, American Dad!, Drawn Together, The Simpsons Movie, Futurama, Batman: The Brave and the Bold, Neighbors from Hell, Chicago Party Aunt), character designer (American Dad!), writer (Harvey Beaks) and director (Allen Gregory, The Legend of Korra, Ben 10, Harley Quinn).
- December 28: John Legend, American singer and songwriter (voice of Jim Posey in The Mitchells vs. the Machines, himself in The Simpsons episode "The Miseducation of Lisa Simpson").

=== Specific date unknown ===
- Alessandro Carloni, Italian film director, animator, and art director (DreamWorks Animation).
- Dave Creek, American animator (Happiness Is a Warm Blanket, Charlie Brown) and character designer (Bob's Burgers, Brickleberry, Central Park, The Great North), (d. 2021).

== Deaths ==
=== January ===
- January 18:
  - Clark Haas, American comics artist, animator and animation producer (Clutch Cargo, Hanna-Barbera), dies at age 58.
  - Junius Matthews, American actor (voice of Archimedes in The Sword in the Stone, Rabbit in the Winnie the Pooh franchise), dies at age 87.

=== February ===
- February 9: Woody Gelman, American animator, comics artist, novelist and publisher (worked for Fleischer Studios and Famous Studios), dies of a stroke at age 62.
- February 28: Dorothy Jones, American screenwriter and wife of Chuck Jones (Gay Purr-ee), dies at age 70.

=== April ===
- April 3: Winston Sharples, American composer (Van Beuren Studios, Fleischer Studios, Famous Studios), dies at age 69.
- April 19: Joe Dougherty, American actor (original voice of Porky Pig), dies at age 79.
- April 21: Thelma Boardman, American actress (voice of Minnie Mouse from 1937 to 1938, and 1941 to 1942), dies at age 68.

=== June ===
- June 1: John W. Burton, American film producer (head of Warner Bros. Cartoons from 1958 to 1960) and cinematographer, dies at age 71.

=== July ===
- July 26: Mary Blair, American artist, animator and designer (The Walt Disney Company), dies at age 66.

=== August ===
- August 24: Louis Prima, American jazz musician and actor (voice of King Louie in The Jungle Book), dies at age 67.
- August 26: Steve Gravers, American actor (voice of Blackwolf in Wizards), dies at age 56 from lung cancer.

=== September ===
- September 9: Jack L. Warner, American film studio executive, co-founder and president of Warner Bros., (credited with the decision to sell the rights of all of the 400 cartoons which Warner Bros. made before 1948 for $3,000 apiece), dies at age 86.
- September 30: Edgar Bergen, American actor, comedian and puppeteer (narrator in the Mickey and the Beanstalk segment in Fun and Fancy Free), dies at age 75.

=== October ===
- October 8: Karl Swenson, American actor (voice of Merlin in The Sword in the Stone), dies at age 70.
- October 10: J.R. Bray, American animator, cartoonist, and film producer (Colonel Heeza Liar), dies at age 99.

=== November ===
- November 20: Tom Okamoto, Japanese-American animator and comics artist (Walt Disney Animation Studios), dies at age 62.

=== December ===
- December 4: Brian Lewis, British illustrator, comics artist and animator (Yellow Submarine), dies at age 49.
- December 23: Louis de Rochemont, American filmmaker, (producer and artistic director for Animal Farm), dies at age 79.
- December 28: Władysław Nehrebecki, Polish animator and television director (Bolek and Lolek), dies at age 55.

== See also ==
- 1978 in anime
