= 1978 in anime =

The events of 1978 in anime.

== Events ==
- September 14 - Artland is created

== Releases ==
English name	Japanese name	Type	Demographic	Regions
The Story of Perrine	ペリーヌ物語 (Perīnu Monogatari)	TV	Family, Children	Spain, Italy, Germany, France, Japan, Philippines, Portugal, Arabia, China (Taiwan), Korea
Magical Girl Tickle	魔女っ子チックル (Majokko Chikkuru)	TV	Shōjo	Spain, France, Italy, Poland, Japan
Metamorphoses	星のオルフェウス (Hoshi no Orufeusu)	Movie	Family	Japan, United States
Ringing Bell	チリンの鈴 (Chirin no Suzu)	Movie	Family, Children	Japan, United States
Space Pirate Captain Harlock	宇宙海賊キャプテンハーロック (Uchū Kaizoku Kyaputen Hārokku)	TV	Seinen	France, Italy, Spain, Germany, Japan, Korea
Danguard Ace: The Great Space Battle	惑星ロボ ダンガードA 宇宙大海戦 (Wakusei Robo Danguard Ace: Uchū Daikaisen)	Movie	Shōnen	Japan
Thumbelina	世界名作童話 おやゆび姫 (Sekai Meisaku Dōwa: Oyayubi Hime)	Movie	Family, Children	Japan, United States, French, Spain, Italy, Poland, Russia, Arabia
Ikkyū-san and the Mischievous Princess	一休さんとやんちゃ姫 (Ikkyū-san to Yancha Hime)	Movie	Family, Children	Arabia, Japan, China (Taiwan)
Candy Candy: The Call of Spring	キャンディ・キャンディ 春の呼び声 (Kyandi Kyandi: Haru no Yobigoe)	Movie	Shōjo	Japan
Fighting General Daimos	闘将ダイモス - (Tōshō Daimos)	TV	Shōnen	Japan, Spain, Italy, Philippines, Poland, China (Hong Kong), China (Taiwan)
Starzinger	SF西遊記スタージンガー (Esu Efu Saiyūki Sutājingā)	TV	Shōnen	Japan, United States, Korea, Spain, Germany, Italy, Philippines, Sweden
Future Boy Conan	未来少年コナン (Mirai Shōnen Konan)	TV	Shōnen	Italy, France, Portugal, Spain, Japan, Arabia, China (Taiwan), Korea
Highschool Baseball Ninja	一球さん (Ikkyū-san)	TV	Shōnen	Japan
Manga History of Origins	まんがはじめて物語 (Manga Hajimete Monogatari)	TV	Family	Japan, Arabia
Haikara-San: Here Comes Miss Modern	はいからさんが通る (Haikara-san ga Tōru)	TV	Shōjo	Japan, Italy, Russia, Arabia, Korea
The Adventures of the Little Prince	星の王子さま プチ・プランス (Hoshi no Ōjisama Puchi Puransu)	TV	Family, Children	Germany, Spain, Japan, Italy, France, Poland, Portugal, Arabia, United States
Science Ninja Team Gatchaman: The Movie	科学忍者隊ガッチャマン 劇場版 (Kagaku Ninjatai Gatchaman: Gekijōban)	Movie	Shōnen	Japan, French, China (Taiwan), United States
Space Pirate Captain Harlock: Mystery of the Arcadia	宇宙海賊キャプテン・ハーロック アルカディア号の謎 (Uchū Kaizoku Kyaputen Hārokku: Arcadia-gou no Nazo)	Movie	Shōnen	Japan, Spain, Italy
Candy Candy's Summer Vacation	キャンディ・キャンディ キャンディの夏休み (Kyandi Kyandi no Natsu Yasumi)	Movie	Shōjo	Japan, Italy
Daikengo	宇宙魔神ダイケンゴー (Uchū Majin Daikengo)	TV	Shōnen	Japan, Korea, Spain, Italy
Invincible Steel Man Daitarn 3	無敵鋼人ダイターン3 (Muteki Kōjin Daitān 3)	TV	Shōnen	Japan, Italy
Farewell to Space Battleship Yamato	さらば宇宙戦艦ヤマト 愛の戦士たち (Saraba Uchū Senkan Yamato Ai no Senshitachi)	Movie	Shōnen	Italy, France, Japan, Russia, Chinese (Taiwan)
One Million-Year Trip: Bander Book	100万年地球の旅バンダーブック (Hyakumannen chikyû no tabi: Bandâ bukku)	TV movie	Shōnen	Japan, France, Italy
I'm Teppei	おれは鉄兵 (Ore wa Teppei)	TV	Shōnen	Japan, Italy, Russia
Galaxy Express 999	銀河鉄道スリーナイン (Ginga Tetsudō Surī Nain)	TV	Shōnen	Japan, United States, France, Spain, Italy, Portugal
King Fang	大雪山の勇者 牙王 (Daisetsusan no Yūsha Kibaō)	TV movie	Family	Japan, Arabia
Gatchaman II	科学忍者隊ガッチャマンII (Kagaku Ninjatai Gatchaman Tsū)	TV	Shōnen	Japan, France, Italy
Manga Children's Library	まんがこども文庫 (Manga Kodomo Bunko)	TV	Family	Japan
Treasure Island	宝島 (Takarajima)	TV	Family	Portugal, Germany, France, Italy, Spain, Netherlands, Japan, Arabia, China (Taiwan)
New Aim for the Ace!	新エースをねらえ! (Shin Ēsu o Nerae!)	TV	Shōjo	Japan, Spain, Italy
Space Battleship Yamato II	宇宙戦艦ヤマト2 (Uchū Senkan Yamato Tsū)	TV	Shōnen	Japan, United States, Italy, Arabia, Portugal
The Pink Lady Story: Angels of Glory	ピンク・レディー物語 栄光の天使たち (Pink Lady Monogatari: Eikou no Tenshi-tachi)	TV	Shōjo	Japan
Captain Future	キャプテン・フューチャー (Kyaputen Fyūchā)	TV	Shōnen	French, United States, France, Spain, Italy, Germany, Arabia
The Mystery of Mamo	ルパン三世 ルパンVS複製人間 (Rupan Sansei: Rupan tai Kurōn)	Movie	Seinen	Japan, United States, United Kingdom, France, Spain, Italy, Netherlands, Portugal, Russian
The Stingiest Man in Town	町一番のけちんぼう (Machi Ichiban no Kechinbō)	TV	Family	Japan, United States
Captain Future: The Great Race in the Solar System	キャプテンフューチャー・華麗なる太陽系レース (Kyaputen Fyūchā: Kareinaru Taiyokei Race)	Movie	Shōnen	Japan, France, Germany
Picadon	ピカドン (Pikadon)	Short	Family	Japan

== See also ==
- 1978 in animation
