= List of animated feature films of 1978 =

This is a list of animated feature films first released in 1978.

== List ==
Title	Country	Director	Production company	Animation technique	Format	Notes	Release date	Duration
77 Group's Secret; 77단의 비밀 (77 Danui Bimil)	South Korea	Bak Seung-cheol	Samdo Film Co., Ltd.	Traditional	Theatrical		July 23, 1978	70 minutes
The Ballad of the Daltons; La Ballade des Dalton	France	René Goscinny; Henri Gruel; Morris; Pierre Watrin	Dargaud Films; Les Productions René Goscinny; Studios Idefix; Les Artistes Associés (distributor)	Traditional	Theatrical		March 10, 1978	82 minutes
Black Beauty	United States	Chris Cuddington	Hanna-Barbera Australia	Traditional	Television special	Originally aired as the 26th installment of the CBS animated anthology series Famous Classic Tales (1970–1984).	October 28, 1978	50 minutes
Captain Future: The Great Race in the Solar System キャプテンフューチャー・華麗なる太陽系レース (Captain Future: Kareinaru Taiyoukei Race)	Japan	Tomoharu Katsumata	Toei Animation; NHK (distributor)	Traditional	Television special		December 31, 1978	58 minutes
Dallyeora Majingga X 달려라 마징가 X (Run Mazinger X)	South Korea	Kim Hyeon-yong	Sekyung Heung Industry Co., Ltd.	Traditional	Theatrical		December 7, 1978	67 minutes
Donald Duck's Cartoon Mania	United States	David Hand; Jack King; Wilfred Jackson; Dick Lundy; Clyde Geronimi; Charles Nichols; Jack Hannah	Walt Disney Productions	Traditional	Theatrical; Compilation film	Film compiled from Disney theatrical animated shorts; originally released theatrically for overseas markets and never in the United States.	July 16, 1978	78 minutes
Fantasia's Attic; El Desván de la Fantasia	Spain	Cruz Delgado; José Ramón Sánchez	Estudios Cruz Delgado	Traditional	Theatrical			75 minutes
Farewell to Space Battleship Yamato: Warriors of Love さらば宇宙戦艦ヤマト 愛の戦士たち (Saraba Uchū Senkan Yamato Ai no Senshitachi)	Japan	Leiji Matsumoto; Toshio Masuda	Group TAC; Toei Company (distributor)	Traditional	Theatrical	Second feature film in the Space Battleship Yamato series; same storyline later reused and expanded on for the TV series Space Battleship Yamato II (1978–1979).	July 14, 1978	151 minutes
Ferda the Ant. How Ferda Lived in the World and Stories about his Friend Little Back; Ferda Mravenec. Jak se měl Ferda ve světě a Příhody brouka Pytlíka	Czechoslovakia; Soviet Union	Hermína Týrlová	Filmové Studio Gottwaldov; Ústrední Pujcovna Filmu (distributor)	Traditional	Theatrical	First Soviet full-length animated film made in the commonwealth with other countries.		60 minutes
The Flintstones: Little Big League	United States	Chris Cuddington	Hanna-Barbera Productions; Hanna-Barbera Pty, Ltd.	Traditional	Television special		April 6, 1978	60 minutes
Gold Wing 123 황금날개 123 (Hwang Geumnalgae 1.2.3.)	South Korea	Kim Cheong-gi	Sejong Cultural Corporation	Traditional	Theatrical		January 5, 1978	71 minutes
The Island of Nevawuz	Australia	Paul Williams	Fable Film Productions; Australian Film Commission	Stop motion	Theatrical			48 minutes
King Fang 大雪山の勇者 牙王 (Daisetsusan no Yūsha Kibaō)	Japan	Eiji Okabe	Nippon Animation	Traditional	Television film		September 23, 1978	70 minutes
Kongjui & Patchui 콩쥐 팥쥐 (Kongjwi Patjwi)	South Korea	Gang Tae-ung	U Production	Stop motion	Theatrical		January 23, 1978	72 minutes
Krabat – The Sorcerer's Apprentice; Krabat, Čarodějův učeň	Czechoslovakia; West Germany	Karel Zeman	Bavaria Atelier; Ceskoslovenský Filmexport; Filmové Studio Gottwaldov; Krátký Film Praha; Süddeutscher Rundfunk (SDR); Ustredni Pujcovna Filmu	Cutout	Theatrical		March 1, 1978	73 minutes
The Light Princess	United Kingdom	Andrew Gosling	BBC	Traditional/Live action	Television film		December 24, 1978	56 minutes
The Lord of the Rings	United States; United Kingdom	Ralph Bakshi	Fantasy Films; United Artists	Traditional/Rotoscope	Theatrical	First American animated feature to be presented in Dolby Stereo; at a running time of 133 minutes, the film is the longest American animated feature.	November 15, 1978	133 minutes
Lupin III: The Mystery of Mamo ルパン三世 ルパンVS複製人間 (Rupan Sansei: Rupan tai Kurōn)	Japan	Sōji Yoshikawa	Tokyo Movie Shinsha; Toho (distributor)	Traditional	Theatrical	First animated feature film installment in the Lupin III manga and anime franchise.	December 16, 1978	102 minutes
The Magic Flute; Il flauto magico	Italy; Australia	Emanuele Luzzati; Giuilio Gianini	Thalia Film	Traditional/Cutout/Live action	Theatrical			54 minutes
Metamorphoses 星のオルフェウス (Hoshi no Orufeusu)	Japan; United States	Terry Ogisu; Takashi; Hiro Tsugawa	Sanrio	Traditional	Theatrical; Anthology film	Later edited down to 82 minutes and reissued on May 3, 1979, under the title Winds of Change.	October 27, 1978	89 minutes
Mickey Mouse Jubilee Show	United States	Walt Disney; Ben Sharpsteen; James Algar; Riley Thomson; Charles Nichols; Milt Schaffer	Walt Disney Productions	Traditional	Theatrical; Compilation film	Film compiled from Disney theatrical animated shorts; originally released theatrically for overseas markets and never in the United States.	June 30, 1978	76 minutes
Not Everything that Flies is a Bird; Nicht alles, was fliegt, ist ein Vogel; Nije Ptica Sve Sto Leti	Germany; Yugoslavia	Borislav Sajtinac	Stockmann Film Verlag	Traditional	Theatrical; Compilation film	Compilation film of several shorts.	November 25, 1978	79 minutes
One Million-Year Trip: Bander Book; 100万年地球の旅バンダーブック (Hyakumannen chikyû no tabi: Bandâ bukku)	Japan	Osamu Tezuka	Tezuka Productions; Nippon TV (distributor)	Traditional	Television film	First two-hour animated television special, the first installment of the Tezuka Star System series of specials and the inaugural animated special produced for Nippon TV's 24 Hour TV "Love Saves the Earth" telethon.	August 27, 1978	94 minutes
The Phoenix 火の鳥 (Hi no Tori)	Japan	Kon Ichikawa	Toho (distributor); Firebird Productions; Tezuka Productions	Traditional/Live action	Theatrical; Live-action animated film	Animated hand drawn elements in otherwise mostly live action feature film.	August 19, 1978	137 minutes
Popeye vs. the Red Indians Braccio di Ferro contro gli indiani	United States; Italy	Seymour Kneitel; Izzy Sparber; Bill Tytla	Famous Studios (archive footage); G.P.S. Distribuzione Cinematografica; United Artists (distributor)	Traditional	Theatrical; Compilation film	Compilation of 12 Famous Studios Popeye the Sailor theatrical animated shorts; originally released theatrically for overseas markets and never in the United States.	December 23, 1978	80 minutes
Puff the Magic Dragon	United States	Charles Swenson; Fred Wolf	Murakami Wolf Swenson; Yarrow/Muller-My Company	Traditional	Television special		October 30, 1978	30 minutes
Ringing Bell チリンの鈴 (Chirin no Suzu)	Japan	Masami Hata	Sanrio	Traditional	Theatrical		March 11, 1978	47 minutes
Robot Taekwon V vs. Golden Wings Showdown 로보트 태권V 대 황금날개의 대결 (Roboteu taegwonbeuiwa hwanggeumnalgaeui daegyeol)	South Korea	Kim Cheong-gi	Sejong Cultural Corporation	Traditional	Theatrical		July 26, 1978	66 minutes
Run, Wonder Princess! 날아라 원더공주 (Narara Wondeogongju)	South Korea	Kim Cheong-gi	U Production	Traditional	Theatrical		July 31, 1978	75 minutes
Science Ninja Team Gatchaman: The Movie 科学忍者隊ガッチャマン 劇場版 (Kagaku Ninjatai Gatchaman: Gekijōban)	Japan	Hisayuki Toriumi	Shochiku (distributor); Tatsunoko Production	Traditional	Theatrical; Compilation film	Alternate retelling of the plot of the animated television series Science Ninja Team Gatchaman, compiling the first three minutes of original material with key footage through episodes 1 to 2, 51 to 53 and 102 to 105.	May 12, 1978	110 minutes
The Stingiest Man in Town 町一番のけちんぼう (Machi Ichiban no Kechinbō)	United States; Japan	Arthur Rankin Jr. Jules Bass; Katsuhisa Yamada	Rankin/Bass Productions; Topcraft	Traditional	Television special	Animated adaptation of the live action musical TV special of the same title, that first aired as a part of The Alcoa Hour on NBC in December 23, 1956.	December 23, 1978	56 minutes
Los Supersabios	Mexico	Anuar Badín	Kinemma S.A.	Traditional	Theatrical		November 4, 1978	78 minutes
The Talking Parcel	United Kingdom	Brian Cosgrove	Cosgrove Hall Films	Traditional	Television film		December 26, 1978	40 minutes
The Thralls; Trællene	Denmark	Jannik Hastrup	Dansk Tegnefilm; Traellenes Boern	Traditional	Theatrical		March 27, 1978	84 minutes
Thumbelina 世界名作童話 おやゆび姫 (Sekai Meisaku Dōwa: Oyayubi Hime)	Japan	Yugo Serikawa	Toei Animation	Traditional	Theatrical	Second film in the anthology film series Sekai Meisaku Dōwa (lit. "World Masterpiece Fairy Tales"); Osamu Tezuka provided the character designs for this feature.	March 18, 1978	64 minutes
The Water Babies	United Kingdom; Poland	Lionel Jeffries	Pethurst International Ltd. (distributor); Studio Miniatur Filmowych	Traditional/Live action	Theatrical		June 23, 1978	105 minutes
Watership Down	United Kingdom	Martin Rosen	Nepenthe Productions; CIC (distributor); Avco Embassy Pictures (distributor)	Traditional	Theatrical	First ever animated feature film to be presented in Dolby Stereo.	October 19, 1978	102 minutes
Wilhelm Busch – Die Trickfilm-Parade: Max und Moritz und andere Streiche	Germany	Hermann Leitner; John Halas	Studio Hamburg; Polyphon	Traditional/Live action	Theatrical		May 15, 1978	82 minutes
Xigua pao 西瓜炮 (Waterwater Cannon)	China	Jin Xi	Shanghai Fine Arts Film Studio	Stop motion	Theatrical			45 minutes

== Highest-grossing animated films of the year ==
Rank	Title	Studio	Gross	Ref
1	Farewell to Space Battleship Yamato	Group TAC	¥4,300,000,000 ($43,000,000)	
2	The Lord of the Rings	Fantasy Films	$30,471,420	

== See also ==
- List of animated television series of 1978
