= A Journey Through Fairyland =

- Directed by: Masami Hata
- Written by: Kyu Takabatake
- Story by: Shintarô Tsuji
- Produced by: Atsushi Tomioka; Tsunemasa Hatano
- Starring: Masachika Ichimura; Tomoko Kaneda
- Cinematography: Iwao Yamaki
- Edited by: Satoshi Yoshioka
- Music by: Naozumi Yamamoto
- Production company: Sanrio Films
- Release dates: October 19, 1985 (JP); 1989 (US)
- Running time: 91 minutes
- Country: Japan
- Language: Japanese

A Journey Through Fairyland (Japanese: 妖精フローレンス, Hepburn: Yōsei Furōrensu; lit. Fairy Florence) is a 1985 Japanese animated film by Sanrio, the company behind Unico, The Sea Prince and the Fire Child and Ringing Bell, though this story is less sought out as a rarity among Sanrio cult classic collectors.

Sanrio's final feature-length anime film until 2007, it was brought to America in 1989 through a company called Celebrity Home Entertainment. Unlike previous works, this one mainly focuses on music more than plot, prompting it to be compared with Disney's older work Fantasia (Video Business review). The one original piece is "My Name is Florence", which contains lyrics and performed in the film; all other songs on the soundtrack are works of classical composition, written by Beethoven and other similarly noteworthy composers.

== Summary ==
A gentle and talented boy named Michael played beautiful music on his oboe, and his greatest love was to play for and tend to the flowers in the greenhouse at the school of music where he attended. Unfortunately, his gardening made him constantly late for orchestra practice and resulted in his dismissal from the school. When Michael fell asleep that same night, he was awakened by a dainty Flower Fairy named Florence, who would take him on an enchanted journey to a land where flowers came alive, treble notes were mischievous, and adventure beckoned. There, he would soon come to realize that his love of flowers and desire to become a great musician could go hand-in-hand and help him to become focused in life and discover himself.

== Voice cast ==
Character	Original	English
Michael	Masachika Ichimura	Jeremy Graham
Florence	Tomoko Kaneda	Audra Sears Henning
Music Teacher/Prof. Low Note	Asei Kobayashi	A. Gregory
Musica/Treble	Mizuki Nakajima	A. Gregory
Laura	Chika Takami	Barbara Jane Henning
Narrator	-	Jo Catanzaro

== Classical music ==
1. Voices of Spring Waltz - Johann Strauss II
2. Oboe Sonata - Gaetano Donizetti
3. Symphony No. 5 - Ludwig van Beethoven
4. Nocturne No. 1 op. 9 - Frederic Francois Chopin
5. Salut d'amour (Meeting of Flower) - Edward William Elgar
6. Symphony No. 8 "Unfinished" - Franz Peter Schubert
7. Oboe Concerto in D minor, II Adagio - Alessandro Marcello
8. Fugue in G minor - Johann Sebastian Bach
9. Souvenir - Drdla
10. Hungarian Dances No. 5 - Johannes Brahms
11. Piano Sonata No. 11 1st mov - Wolfgang Amadeus Mozart
12. Waltz of the Flowers from The Nutcracker - Peter Ilyich Tchaikovsky
13. Tritsch-Tratsch-Polka - Johann Strauss II
14. Barcarolle from Les Contes d'Hoffmann - Jacques Offenbach
15. Duet of Love - Naozumi Yamamoto
16. Symphonie Fantastique 4th mov - Louis Hector Berlioz
17. Flight of the Bumblebee - Rimsky-Korsakov
18. L' Arlesienne Suite No. 2 "Farandole" - Georges Bizet
19. Symphonie Fantastique 5th mov - Louis Hector Berlioz
20. The Firebird - Igor Fyodorovitch Stravinsky
21. Clair de Lune - Claude Achille Debussy
22. Salut d'amour (Separation of flower) - Edward William Elgar
23. Oboe Concerto 3rd mov - Wolfgang Amadeus Mozart
24. Violin Concerto 3rd mov - Felix Mendelssohn
