= Super Watermelon Island =

- Steven Universe episode
- Amethyst (left), Garnet (center), and Pearl prepare to fuse into Alexandrite.
- Episode no.: Season 3 Episode 1
- Directed by: Ki-Yong Bae (animation); Sue Hong Kim (animation); Jasmin Lai (art); Joe Johnston (supervising); Ian Jones-Quartey (co-executive producer)
- Written by: Joe Johnston; Jeff Liu
- Original air date: May 12, 2016
- Running time: 11 minutes

Guest appearance
- Rita Rani Ahuja as Alexandrite

Episode chronology
| ← Previous "Log Date 7 15 2" | Next → "Gem Drill" |

"Super Watermelon Island" is the first episode of the third season of American animated television series Steven Universe, which premiered on May 12, 2016 on Cartoon Network. It was written and storyboarded by Joe Johnston and Jeff Liu. The episode was viewed by 1.693 million viewers.

The episode resolves the threat of Malachite, established at the end of the first season. After astral projecting into one of the Watermelon Stevens and learning that they have founded a civilization on Mask Island, Steven finds Malachite on the island as well; he tells the Gems, who warp there and fuse into Alexandrite to defeat Malachite and break her fusion.

== Plot ==
The episode begins with Steven (Zach Callison) waking up in the body of a Watermelon Steven, one of the sentient watermelons shaped like himself that he created in the first-season episode "Watermelon Steven". Steven sees that the Watermelon Stevens have created their own society on Mask Island, complete with homes, jobs and rituals. Steven's watermelon body is selected for one such ritual and led to the top of a cliff. Suddenly, Malachite (Kimberly Brooks as Jasper and Jennifer Paz as Lapis Lazuli) rises up from the ocean and devours him whole.

Steven wakes up at his family's barn in his own body and tells Garnet (Estelle), Amethyst (Michaela Dietz), and Pearl (Deedee Magno Hall) that Malachite is active. They tell Steven to stay put with Peridot (Shelby Rabara) while they go to the island to fight Malachite. Steven astral-projects into another Watermelon Steven to help them.

On Mask Island, the Crystal Gems fuse into Alexandrite (Rita Rani Ahuja), and she and Malachite engage in battle. During the fight, Alexandrite accidentally destroys the warp pad the Crystal Gems used to teleport to the island.

As Malachite gains the advantage, Steven rallies the frightened Watermelon Stevens, who have taken refuge in a cave. The Watermelon Stevens arm themselves and march into battle.

Malachite immobilizes Alexandrite in a block of ice. Before she can finish her off, the Watermelon Stevens begin their assault, managing to down and distract Malachite for long enough for Alexandrite to free herself. As Malachite begins smashing the Watermelon Stevens, Alexandrite reengages in the battle. She soon gains the upper hand and defeats Malachite, who de-fuses into her component Gems, Lapis and Jasper, both unconscious.

Alexandrite defuses herself back into an exhausted Garnet, Amethyst, and Pearl. They thank Steven and the Watermelon Stevens for their bravery and enjoy a brief moment of celebration; but suddenly, the island begins to tremble and a giant fissure forms across the beach. Amethyst manages to catch Lapis, but Jasper falls in. Garnet realizes that the earthquake portends the emergence of the Cluster, an underground geo-weapon that threatens to destroy the Earth, and tells Steven that he must drill to the Earth's core with Peridot to destroy the Cluster. As he begins to regain consciousness, the Gems remind Steven that they love him.

== Production ==
The episode was written and storyboarded by Joe Johnston and Jeff Liu and directed by Ki-Yong Bae & Sue Hong Kim (animation), Jasmin Lai (art), Joe Johnston (supervising) and Ian Jones-Quartey (co-executive producer). The episode makes reference to Gulliver's Travels in that the Watermelon Steven's attack on Malachite is similar to how the Lilliputians down Gulliver.

=== Music ===
The episode features instrumental songs "Watermelon Steven", "Collaboration/Malachite VS Alexandrite: Part 1" and "Malachite VS Alexandrite: Part 2" all composed by Aivi & Surasshu.

== Broadcast and reception ==
"Super Watermelon Island" premiered on May 12, 2016 on Cartoon Network. Its initial American broadcast was viewed by approximately 1.693 million viewers. It received a Nielsen household rating of 0.46, meaning that it was seen by 0.46% of all households. The episode was the first of a two-part episode which was the first episode of the "In Too Deep" special event in which five new episodes aired across four weeks.

The episode received generally positive reviews, specifically with the conclusion of the Malachite story arc and the progress in the Cluster arc. James Whitbrook of io9 declared the entire In Too Deep event as the "show at its best" and said the episode provided an effective and satisfying close on the current storyline. Eric Thurm of The A.V. Club, however, was more critical of the episode, giving the episode a B+, saying that the assault on the Cluster felt "increasingly-delayed" and that the Malachite/Alexandrite fight lacked "resolution of emotional stakes" which had made previous fight scenes more enjoyable. However, he did concede that he was "quibbling because of high expectations".
