= Masami Hata =

Japanese film director, screenwriter and animator

- 波多 正美
- Born: November 5, 1942 (age 83); Taipei, Taiwan
- Citizenship: Japan
- Occupations: Animator, filmmaker
- Years active: 1965–present

Masami Hata (波多 正美, Hata Masami; born 5 November 1942) is a Japanese animator and director known for his contributions to television and theatrical animation.

== Biography ==
Born in 1942 in Taihoku (now Taipei) during the Japanese occupation of Taiwan, Masami Hata was raised in Japan's Toyama Prefecture.

Hata began his career in 1965 as an animator at Mushi Production, directing episodes of Wonder 3 (The Amazing 3). During his time at Mushi Production, he also contributed to other notable series, including Ribbon no Kishi (Princess Knight) and Ashita no Joe.

Following the closure of Mushi Production in 1973, Hata briefly worked with Tokyo Movie Shinsha, where he provided storyboards and directed episodes for various television series. In 1975, he joined Sanrio as the company expanded into animation production. During his tenure at Sanrio, which lasted for over a decade, Hata directed several feature-length animated films, including the 1978 film Ringing Bell, the 1981 film The Legend of Sirius, and the 1985 film Fairy Florence.

After the dissolution of Sanrio's animation division, Sanrio Films, in 1985, Hata continued his career as a freelance director and storyboard artist, contributing to a range of television series and theatrical productions across different studios.

Notably, Hata was selected as the co-director of the 1989 TMS film Little Nemo: Adventures in Slumberland along with William Hurtz after a lengthy production process. Before reaching him, the film passed through numerous other creative hands, including Isao Takahata, Hayao Miyazaki, Ray Bradbury, Chris Columbus, Brad Bird, Frank Thomas, Ollie Johnson, Paul Julian, Jean "Mœbius" Giraud, and Brian Froud.

== Filmography ==
Title	Year	Role
Wonder 3	1965	Script (ep 50), Episode Director (eps 28, 40, 50)
Gokuu no Daibouken	1967	Episode Director
Ribbon no Kishi	1967	Episode Director (ep 16)
Wanpaku Tanteidan	1968	Episode Director
Animal 1	1968	Episode Director (ep 2)
Senya Ichiya Monogatari	1969	Key Animation
Ashita no Joe	1970	Episode Director (eps 5, 14, 31, 74)
Cleopatra	1970	Key Animation
Andersen Monogatari (TV)	1971	Animation Director
Kunimatsu-sama no Otoridai	1971	Episode Director
Jungle Kurobee	1973	Storyboard (eps 3, 5, 9)
Wansa-kun	1973	Episode Director (eps 2, 7, 13)
Kouya no Shounen Isamu	1973	Storyboard
Ace wo Nerae!	1973	Storyboard (eps 7, 10, 12, 14, 16, 21, 23, 25)
Judo Sanka	1974	Episode Director
Hajime Ningen Gyatoruz	1974	Episode Director
Manga Sekai Mukashibanashi	1976	Episode Director
Jetter Mars	1977	Episode Director
Chiisana Jumbo	1977	Episode Director
Chirin no Suzu	1978	Director
Animation Kikou: Marco Polo no Bouken	1979	Storyboard (ep 18)
Hoshi no Orpheus	1979	Key Animation
Sirius no Densetsu	1981	Director, Screenplay
Yume no Hoshi no Button Nose	1985	Storyboard, Episode Director, Chief Animation Director
Yousei Florence	1985	Director
Super Mario Bros.: The Great Mission to Rescue Princess Peach!	1986	Director
Nayuta	1986	Director
Little Nemo: Adventures in Slumberland	1989	Director
Hello Kitty no Cinderella	1989	Chief Animation Director
Kiki to Lala no Aoi Tori	1989	Director, Chief Animation Director
My Melody no Akazukin	1989	Chief Animation Director
Tezuka Osamu Monogatari: Boku wa Son Gokuu	1989	Director, Screenplay
Kerokero Keroppi no Daibouken	1989	Director
Kerokero Keroppi no Daibouken: Fushigi na Mame no Ki	1990	Director
Hello Kitty: Mahou no Mori no Ohimesama	1991	Chief Animation Director, Screenplay
Kerokero Keroppi no Sanjuushi	1991	Director (Chief), Screenplay
Taabou no Ryuuguusei Daitanken	1991	Chief Animation Director
Kerokero Keroppi no Soratobu Yume no Fune	1992	Director
Kerokero Keroppi no Tomodachitte Ii na	1992	Director
Yousei Dick	1992	Director
Kerokero Keroppi no Ganbare! Keroppooz	1992	Director
Kerokero Keroppi no Kyouryuu ga Deta	1992	Director
Kerokero Keroppi no Christmas Eve no Okurimono	1992	Director
Kerokero Keroppi no Bokura no Ohimesama	1992	Director
Kerokero Keroppi no Tomodachi wa Mahoutsukai	1993	Director
Kiki to Lala no Ohimesama ni Naritai	1993	Director
Kerokero Keroppi no Yowamushi-ouji no Daibouken	1993	Director
Kerokero Keroppi no Bouken: Pink no Kinoko	1993	Director
Kiki to Lala no Hansel to Gretel	1993	Director
Kerokero Keroppi no Gulliver no Bouken	1993	Director
Kerokero Keroppi no Kero Kero House no Himitsu	1993	Director
Kiki to Lala no Hakuchouza no Ohimesama	1993	Director
Hello Kitty no Yume Dorobou	1993	Director
Kiki to Lala no Hoshi no Dance Shoes	1993	Director
Kerokero Keroppi no Robin Hood	1994	Director
Kerokero Keroppi no Tomodachi ni Narou yo	1994	Director
Hello Kitty no Alps no Shoujo Heidi II: Klara to no Deai	1994	Director
Hello Kitty no Papa Nante Daikirai	1994	Director
Kerokero Keroppi no Bokutachi no Takaramono	1994	Director
Kerokero Keroppi no Sora wo Tobetara	1994	Director
Kiki to Lala no Habatake! Pegasus	1994	Director
Kiki to Lala no Papa to Mama ni Aitai	1994	Director, Screenplay
Hello Kitty no Shoukoujo	1994	Director
Hello Kitty no Shiawase no Tulip	1995	Director
Ike! Ina-chuu Takkyuu-bu	1995	Director
Hello Kitty no Minna no Mori wo Mamore!	1996	Director
Kerokero Keroppi no Bikkuri! Obakeyashiki	1996	Director
Elmer no Bouken: My Father's Dragon	1997	Director
Anime TV de Hakken! Tamagotchi	1997	Director
DT Eightron	1998	Director
Initial D First Stage	1998	Storyboard, Episode Director
Ojarumaru	1998	Storyboard (eps 76, 84, 85)
Aesop's World	1999	Director
InuYasha	2000	Storyboard (various episodes)
Hello Kitty no Oyayubi-hime	2001	Chief Animation Director
Inuyasha the Movie: Affections Touching Across Time	2001	Storyboard, Episode Director
Astro Boy: Tetsuwan Atom	2003	Episode Director (ep 29)
Hi no Tori	2004	Storyboard (eps 5, 13)
Nezumi Monogatari: George to Gerald no Bouken	2007	Director, Storyboard
Stitch!	2008	Director
Stitch! Itazura Alien no Daibouken	2009	Director
Hajime no Ippo: Rising	2013	Storyboard (ED1), Episode Director (ep 8)
Garo: Honoo no Kokuin	2014	Episode Director (eps 2, 4, 9, 14, 21)
Garo: Guren no Tsuki	2015	Storyboard (ep 3)
JoJo's Bizarre Adventure: Diamond is Unbreakable	2016	Episode Director (ep 19)
Onihei	2017	Storyboard (ep 6), Episode Director (eps 1, 7, 12)
Dororo	2019	Episode Director (ep 13)
Adachi and Shimamura	2020	Episode Director (ep 11)
Isekai Maou to Shoukan Shoujo no Dorei Majutsu Ω	2021	Episode Director (ep 6)
Kanojo mo Kanojo	2021	Episode Director (eps 1, 6)
Pluto	2023	Key Animation
