= Picadon =

- A screenshot from the film.
- ピカドン
- Directed by: Renzo Kinoshita
- Screenplay by: Sayoko Kinoshita
- Produced by: Renzo Kinoshita; Daizaburo Hayashi; Toshihiro Komori
- Cinematography: Satoru Isobe
- Music by: Reijiro Koroku; Production Nova
- Production company: Studio Lotus
- Release date: September 19, 1978
- Running time: 8 minutes
- Country: Japan

Picadon (Japanese: ピカドン Pikadon, 'atomic bomb') is a 1978 Japanese short animated documentary war film anime, produced and directed by Renzō Kinoshita.

== Plot ==
The sound of a ticking clock permeates a typical summer morning in Hiroshima on August 6, 1945. A mother opens some sliding doors to let in fresh air, and is met with the sound of chirping cicadas. Her young son and preteen daughter prepare for school, while her husband leaves for work. As the children and father depart, the narrative shifts to a broad view of the community, particularly mothers, young children, and factory workers supporting the war effort. A young child throws a stone into a pond, which briefly flashes with sunlight. A man glances warily at the shadow cast by passing military planes as air raid alarms sound. A young boy throws a paper airplane from a balcony, and the score abruptly halts when the plane falls inertly to the ground.

The Enola Gay appears, and the civilians look up as Little Boy releases. It detonates with a blinding flash, followed by a massive explosion that decimates the Hiroshima Prefectural Industrial Promotion Hall (now the Hiroshima Peace Memorial) and flattens the rest of the city. Graphic depictions of the bomb's effects include skin sloughing off bodies, a breastfeeding mother shielding her infant as both melt into an indiscernible mass, and a schoolgirl gaping at her charred hands. The sequence culminates in a photograph of the ruined Industrial Promotion Hall with a solitary animated figure amongst the rubble. A reprise of the boy throwing the paper airplane shows the craft soaring from the past into a rebuilt modern-day Hiroshima, where it casts its shadow over the city.
