= Rita Rani Ahuja =

American actress

- Born: Silver Spring, Maryland, U.S.
- Occupations: Actress, producer
- Years active: 2002–present

Rita Rani Ahuja is an American actress and producer. She is best known for directing Bombay Skies and voicing Alexandrite on the Cartoon Network television series Steven Universe.

== Awards and nominations ==
Ahuja's short film Bombay Skies won numerous awards, including Best Short Film at the 2008 LA Femme Film Festival in Los Angeles. She also won the 2003 Images Award from the Filmi Film Festival in Toronto, Canada for her work as an actress in the feature film Trade Offs.

== Filmography ==
Film
Year	Film	Role	Notes
2003	Trade Offs	Neha	
2003	American Addiction	Varsha	
2005	Behind the Curtain	Ms. Kubelick	
2005	Wedding Crashers	Indian Bridesmaid	
2006	Bombay Skies	Anjali	
2010	Peep World	Doctor	
2015	The Way We Weren't	Dr. Sahni	
Television
Year	Title	Role	Notes
2006	The Path to 9/11	Additional voice (voice)	
2006	Sleeper Cell	Female Worshipper #1	
2014, 2016	Steven Universe	Alexandrite (voice)	Episodes: "Fusion Cuisine" & "Super Watermelon Island"
