= List of Future Boy Conan episodes =

This article is a list of all 26 episodes of Future Boy Conan, an anime television series by Nippon Animation. The series began airing in Japan on 4 April 1978 at 7:30 pm on the NHK TV network in Japan. It ran for about seven months, with episode 26 airing on 31 October 1978.

== Episodes ==
No.	Title	Original release date
1	"Remnant Island"; Transliteration: "Nokosarejima" (Japanese: のこされ島)	April 4, 1978
On Remnant Island, a tiny surviving enclave of humanity on the devastated Earth, Conan lives alone with his grandfather until a young girl, Lana, washes up on the shore. Two soldiers of Industria land their hydroplane and kidnap Lana. While threatening the intruders with a missile, Conan's grandfather is mortally injured when one of the soldiers opens fire on him, detonating the launcher.
2	"The Journey"; Transliteration: "Tabidachi" (Japanese: 旅立ち)	April 11, 1978
After Lana is kidnapped by the two soldiers from Industria, Conan fails to rescue her. Conan's grandfather dies from his injuries. After burying his grandfather, Conan builds a boat and sets off to rescue Lana.
3	"The First Friend"; Transliteration: "Hajimete no Nakama" (Japanese: はじめての仲間)	April 18, 1978
Conan arrives at an island where a wild boy, Jimsy, lives. After an initial fight, Conan develops a good friendship with Jimsy. The Barracuda comes to the same island, getting the inhabitants to salvage for plastic. After Conan finds out the Barracuda is from Industria, he and Jimsy plan to stow away aboard the ship.
4	"The Barracuda"; Transliteration: "Barakūda-gō" (Japanese: バラクーダ号)	April 25, 1978
Jimsy and Conan sneak onto the ship, but Jimsy gets drunk and alerts the captain of their presence. After the boys are caught, Captain Dyce lets Conan and Jimsy stay on the ship if they will take punishment. Jimsy passes out and Conan takes both their beatings. They work on the ship doing random jobs. Finally, the ship sets sail for Industria.
5	"Industria"; Transliteration: "Indasutoria" (Japanese: インダストリア)	May 9, 1978
After the Barracuda arrives in Industria, Conan is thrown in the brig after he assaults Monsley who was visiting the ship. Lepka, the self-serving chief administrator of Industria's High Committee, tries to threaten Lana into telling him where her grandfather is. Monsley decides to take Conan in for "re-education". When the soldiers come to take him, Conan escapes and, after a rough flight through the bowels of Industria, eventually finds Lana.
6	"Dyce's Rebellion"; Transliteration: "Daisu no Hangyaku" (Japanese: ダイスの反逆)	May 16, 1978
While making their escape, Conan and Lana come upon a plane from the last war that Lepka wants to power with Dr. Lao's solar energy process for his plans of world conquest. They are captured, and Lepka threatens to hurt Conan if Lana doesn't tell him where her grandfather is, but she refuses. Upon witnessing Lepka's viciousness, Dyce decides to help Lana. Dyce and his crew kidnap Lana and make their escape on the Barracuda.
7	"Chase"; Transliteration: "Tsuiseki" (Japanese: 追跡)	May 23, 1978
Dyce escapes in the fog. Lepka gets permission to use the gunboat and Falco to pursue Dyce. Conan escapes from jail and sneaks onto the Falco. Jimsy informs Lana that he is a companion of Conan. Dyce meets with Lana and when she gets angry that he left Conan he opens the window and threatens to throw her out. The Falco sees the light and follows the Barracuda. Conan escapes and attempts to board the Barracuda.
8	"Escape"; Transliteration: "Tōbō" (Japanese: 逃亡)	May 30, 1978
Lana escapes and uses a lifeboat to save Conan. The gunboat boards the Barracuda and captures Dyce and his crew. Lana and Conan escape on the lifeboat. While trying to make it to the shore, the gunboat blows up the lifeboat, but Conan and Lana survive and make it to the nearby island, where they discover an old battlefield littered with tanks. Lana hears her grandfather by telepathy, and Conan and Lana set out to cross the desert.
9	"The Salvage Ship"; Transliteration: "Sarubēji sen" (Japanese: サルベージ船)	June 6, 1978
After crossing the desert, Lana and Conan are discovered by a man named Patch, who works at an Industrian salvage platform where a passenger ship is about to be uplifted from the seabed. After proving his diving skills to Patch, Conan and Lana are set to work. Terit, an ambitious worker on the platform who longs to be elevated to a higher grade of citizenship in Industria, tries to identify them. He sneaks onto the Falco, which stopped by, and informs Monsley that Conan and Lana are there.
10	"Doctor Lao"; Transliteration: "Rao Hakase" (Japanese: ラオ博士)	June 13, 1978
Terit returns to Industria and is given a radio to inform Lepka when Lana meets her grandfather. However, an earthquake hits the desert island; Patch goes down and gets trapped beneath the ship, and Conan rescues him. When Patch is revealed to be Dr. Lao, Terit informs Industria of Dr. Lao's presence; but another tremor causes the beach near the salvaging platform to sink into the ocean, and the platform begins to float out to sea. Knowing that Industria will send forces to capture them, Lao, Conan, and Lana escape in a small lifeboat.
11	"Flight"; Transliteration: "Dasshutsu" (Japanese: 脱出)	June 20, 1978
Returning to the desert island, Conan, Lana and Dr. Lao recover the flying machine Lao used to escape from Industria, but they need to return there to fix it completely. While flying to the city, they find and rescue Dyce, who was left to die in the desert for his act of rebellion. The Falco arrives and attacks, but Conan tricks the crew into crashing their plane. When another earthquake occurs, Lao begins to surmise that the Earth's crust is breaking up, heralding yet another cataclysm. Following their arrival, Conan and Dyce go to rescue the crew and retake the Barracuda, while Lao and Lana infiltrate the Triangle Tower. However, Monsley has had time to inform Lepka that Lao is back in Industria.
12	"Core Block"; Transliteration: "Koa Burokku" (Japanese: コアブロック)	June 27, 1978
Lana and Lao descend to the Triangle Tower's Core Block to acquire the IC chip they need to repair their flyer. While Dyce and his crew - minus Jimsy, who refuses to abandon Conan - turn tail, Conan frees some prisoners who have rebelled against Lepka, and together they search for Lao. Luke, the leader of the prisoners, leads Conan and Jimsy to the Core Block, but Lepka and his soldiers arrive there as well. With the help of the ex-prisoners, Conan's group escapes the Core Block and heads to High Harbor, with Dyce and his crew joining them along the way.
13	"High Harbor"; Transliteration: "Haihābā" (Japanese: ハイハーバー)	July 4, 1978
Lao drops the children off on the Barracuda and heads back to Industria in order to aid its citizens against the impending cataclysm. The Barracuda proceeds to High Harbor, where the local residents initially meet the ship with hostility until Lana is able to explain that the crew has joined their side now. While the Barracuda crew is allowed to disembark from their damaged ship, Lana gives Conan and Jimsy a tour of the island, thereby encountering Orlo, the overjoyous villagers and Lana's aunt and uncle. After hearing her story, Conan and Jimsy are allowed to stay.
14	"A Day on the Island"; Transliteration: "Shima no Ichinichi" (Japanese: 島の一日)	July 11, 1978
Conan, Jimsy, and Lana go to Windmill Village, High Harbor's industrial district. After taking a brief tour, Conan and Jimsy decide they will go fishing and hunting to earn their daily bread. While fishing, Conan meets Mr. Gull, who takes care of the village fish preserve, and begins working for him. Jimsy meanwhile is chased by and kills a massive wild boar when they both fall over the edge of a cliff. He butchers and cooks the pig, and brings it back to the village for the people to eat. The victory is short-lived, however, since the pig was not wild but belonged to Orlo. After learning of this, Conan and Jimsy go to Orlo to take responsibility.
15	"Wasteland"; Transliteration: "Kōchi" (Japanese: 荒地)	July 18, 1978
As they reach the mountain, Conan and Jimsy are attacked and captured by Orlo's anarchist gang. They make a deal that Orlo will forget about his lost pig, if they can prove that they really brought it down by defeating another one of his boars. Using cleverness and teamwork, they succeed, and Jimsy decides to work for Orlo. However, when Orlo's sister Tera tries to steal a goat from Tito, a herder from another village on the other side of the island, Jimsy quits. Just as matters begin to get ugly, Lana, who has noticed Conan and Jimsy's absence, arrives and gives a memento of her mother, a valuable necklace, to compensate for the lost pig.
16	"Their Hut"; Transliteration: "Futari no Koya" (Japanese: 二人の小屋)	August 1, 1978
Lana has a premonition about an Industrian attack on High Harbor, a message she is sure was sent by her grandfather. To ease her mind, Conan takes her to Tito's village, where Jimsy has become a pig herder, and he also shows her the treehouse they have erected to live in. Meanwhile, Orlo is visited by Dyce, who has tired of life on land and wants to set out to sea again. Dyce convinces Orlo to help fix the Barracuda, in return for Dyce helping to kill Conan and Jimsy. But at the very moment the deed is to be committed, Industrian troops under Monsley launch an attack against High Harbor.
17	"Battle"; Transliteration: "Sentō" (Japanese: 戦闘)	August 8, 1978
Conan and Jimsy, who have escaped Orlo's attempt on their lives, scout out the Industrian ship, while Lana warns the village about the incursion. Orlo's men try to fight the invaders but are defeated. After rescuing Tera, Conan, Jimsy and Dyce hurry to the village to help the villagers organize their defense. By landing on the wrong side of the island, Monsley has lost the element of surprise, but Orlo and his men switch sides for Industria, infiltrate High Harbor's defenses and betray them from within. Lana is knocked out by a cannon blast, and when Conan sees Jimsy's pet piglet, which was entrusted to Lana, arrive on its own, he immediately rushes to save her.
18	"Gunboat"; Transliteration: "Gan Bōto" (Japanese: ガンボート)	August 15, 1978
Conan saves Lana from Industria's soldiers but gets knocked out; Lana manages to hide him before she gets captured and taken aboard the gunboat. Industria occupies High Harbor, and Orlo is installed as a puppet governor. To deprive them of their only means of support, Conan and Gil, the only villager to escape, prepare to sink the gunboat with explosives. But after planting the charge, Conan learns that Lana is aboard and boards the vessel to retrieve her, but ends up captured. After tricking the crew into taking him out of his cell, the charge detonates, sinking the ship and allowing Conan to rescue Lana from her cell.
19	"Giant Tsunami"; Transliteration: "Ōtsunami" (Japanese: 大津波)	August 29, 1978
With the gunboat gone, Monsley decides to repair the Barracuda and use it in its place, while Orlo's gang is sent out to find Conan. Conan and Gil plan to blow up the Barracuda; Dyce, while getting away from the Industrians, stumbles upon Lana in the fish preserve. When the island's animals begin to act strangely, Lana knows that another earthquake is about to happen, and rushes to warn the villagers. When Orlo stops her, Lana telepathically informs Conan that a tidal wave is coming. Conan warns everybody, and they all run to higher ground as the wave rushes in. With the Barracuda stranded atop the island's forest by the flood, the soldiers give up and the villagers win the war.
20	"To Industria Again"; Transliteration: "Futatabi Indasutoria He" (Japanese: 再びインダストリアへ)	September 12, 1978
The village chief lets the soldiers join their community. Conan decides to return to Industria using an old seaplane left by Dr. Lao in the fish preserve cave. Together with Jimsy, Monsley, Lana as a last-minute joiner, and Dyce as a stowaway, Conan departs High Harbor; but just upon reaching Industria, the group encounters the restored Falcon. After letting Lana, Dyce, and Jimsy disembark, Conan and Monsley distract the Falcon by leading it away from their friends.
21	"The Citizens Underground"; Transliteration: "Chika no Jūmin-tachi" (Japanese: 地下の住民たち)	September 19, 1978
Conan and Monsley crash into Industria and are captured. Under pursuit, Lana, Dyce, and Jimsy find a way into the underground barracks of Industria's lower-class citizenry. They eventually come across Luke and his friends, and learn from them that Dr. Lao managed to make a deal with the High Council to evacuate Industria, but they were all detained by Lepka, who subsequently appointed himself dictator. Monsley witnesses Lepka viciously torturing Lao and ruthlessly planning to flush Lana out of hiding by flooding the entire underground residential area. She tries to persuade him to follow Dr. Lao's advice, but when Lepka stubbornly refuses to follow a more peaceful path, Monsley openly turns against him and helps Conan escape. However, before she can accompany Conan, she gets shot, forcing Conan to leave her behind.
22	"Rescue"; Transliteration: "Kyūshutsu" (Japanese: 救出)	September 25, 1978
Conan descends to the residential area to rescue Lana. After overhearing Lepka's intentions to flood the caverns, he attempts to defuse the bombs used to create the flooding breach, but is unsuccessful. Lana gives herself up to save the residents; but after she is back in his hands, Lepka seals the exit anyway, leaving the people to drown. When he takes Lana to her grandfather, however, he is forced to learn that Dr. Lao has gone numb and blind from his tortures, rendering further threats against him useless, so he tries to force Lana to contact him by threatening to plunge her off the Triangle Tower. In the meantime Conan rejoins Dyce and Jimsy, and they exit the caverns through a flooded earthquake fissure, where they rescue Monsley, who was about to be executed. They manage to open the main shutter to the caverns, and the residents storm the Triangle Tower.
23	"Solar Tower"; Transliteration: "Taiyō-tō" (Japanese: 太陽塔)	October 3, 1978
Conan continues going up the tower to confront Lepka, who attempts to flee via a flying machine, with Lana as his hostage. Conan cripples the vessel and saves Lana, while Lepka apparently perishes aboard the crashing machine. While Dyce takes Monsley away for medical treatment and keeps her company, Lana wakes Dr. Lao, and together they and the High Council scientists work to complete the Solar Tower and activate the satellite. The link-up is successfully established, and Industria gains the power it needs to facilitate the evacuation program. After preparations are initiated, Lao uses the Triangle Tower's holographic park to explain to Conan, Lana and Jimsy that the old world's dream of unlimited power - an unattainable illusion - was responsible for the great catastrophe that devastated the Earth, and that humanity shall henceforth learn to live in harmony with nature again.
24	"Gigant"; Transliteration: "Giganto" (Japanese: ギガント)	October 17, 1978
As new earthquakes begin to herald Industria's incoming destruction, Lepka, who has survived the crash of his flyer, and a troop of loyalists secretly channel some solar power underground to charge up the Giganto, a giant warplane left over from the last war. When the power leak is discovered and cut, Lepka's forces covertly seize the control room and continue to divert power to the plane. Noticing the takeover, Lana and Monsley escape aboard the Falco to inform the others. Conan and his friends have just finished raising the sunken passenger ship when Lana and Monsley warn them about Lepka, and they return to Industria; but having completed recharging, the Giganto takes off. Conan's group attempts to stop it, but ends up crashing through the plane's surface. After pushing the Falco back out to enable Monsley and Lana to return to Industria, Conan, Jimsy and Dyce infiltrate the Giganto.
25	"The End of Industria"; Transliteration: "Indasutoria no Saigo" (Japanese: インダストリアの最期)	October 24, 1978
Evading Lepka's attempts to eliminate them, Conan, Jimsy, and Dyce start inflicting critical damage to the Giganto. While Dyce and Jimsy eventually end up getting jettisoned inside the tail rudder, Conan confronts Lepka as he tries to get away in an escape pod. Despite Conan's attempt to save them, Lepka and the rest of his men are left to perish aboard the doomed Giganto. A week later, as the final stage of the cataclysm arrives, all the Industrians except the High Council mount the restored passenger ship and watch Industria sink into the sea.
26	"Finale"; Transliteration: "Daidan'en" (Japanese: 大団円)	October 31, 1978
On its way to High Harbor, the passenger ship recovers Conan, Dyce and Jimsy from the sea; and after asking Conan to look after Lana, Dr. Lao dies contently. Sometime later, the old and new inhabitants of High Harbor conduct a double celebration surrounding Dyce and Monsley's wedding and the relaunch of the Barracuda. Many of the new settlers, including Conan, Lana, Jimsy, Tera, Luke, Monsley and the Barracuda's crew, leave to establish a new colony on Remnant Island, now expanded by the cataclysm into a new continent.

== See also ==
- Future Boy Conan
