= List of Space Battleship Yamato II episodes =

This article is a list of episodes from the television show Space Battleship Yamato II in order by production number.

== Episodes ==
| No. | Title | Original release date |
|---|---|---|
| 1 | "2201: The Yamato Returns!"; Transliteration: "2201-Nen Yamato Kikan Seyo!" (Japanese: 2201年ヤマト帰還せよ!) | October 14, 1978 |
| 2 | "The Comet Appears; Remodeling the Yamato!"; Transliteration: "Suisei Shutsugen・Yamato o Kaizō Seyo!" (Japanese: 彗星出現・ヤマトを改造せよ!) | October 21, 1978 |
| 3 | "Earth's Crisis Awakens the Yamato!"; Transliteration: "Chikyū no Kiki ni Tate Yamato!" (Japanese: 地球の危機に起てヤマト!) | October 28, 1978 |
| 4 | "Blast off to the Unknown!"; Transliteration: "Michi e no Hasshin!" (Japanese: 未知への発進!) | November 4, 1978 |
| 5 | "Open Main Guns! Target: Yamato!"; Transliteration: "Shuhō Zenkai! Mokuhyō Yamato!" (Japanese: 主砲全開! 目標ヤマト!!) | November 11, 1978 |
| 6 | "Heavy Fighting! The Space Marines!"; Transliteration: "Gekisen! Kūkan Kiheitai" (Japanese: 激戦! 空間騎兵隊) | November 18, 1978 |
| 7 | "Counter-attack! The Invisible Space Submarine!"; Transliteration: "Guakushū! Sugata Naki Senchūkan (Supēsu Sabu)" (Japanese: 逆襲! 姿なき潜宙艦（スペース・サブ) | November 25, 1978 |
| 8 | "Space Storm! Escape is Impossible!"; Transliteration: "Uchū Kiryū! Dasshutsu Fukanō" (Japanese: 宇宙気流! 脱出不可能) | December 2, 1978 |
| 9 | "Charge! Destroy the Yamato!"; Transliteration: "Totsugeki! Yamato o Bakuchin Seyo!" (Japanese: 突撃! ヤマトを爆沈せよ) | December 9, 1978 |
| 10 | "Crisis Relief! The Roar Of The Wave-Motion Gun"; Transliteration: "Kiki Toppa! Hoero Hadō-hō" (Japanese: 危機突破! 吠えろ波動砲) | December 16, 1978 |
| 11 | "Leader Desslok, the Vengeful Demon!"; Transliteration: "Fukushū no Oni・Desurā Sōtō" (Japanese: 復讐の鬼・デスラー総統) | December 23, 1978 |
| 12 | "Will The Yamato Perish In the Hollow Planetoid?"; Transliteration: "Yamato Kūdō Wakuesei ni Shisu!?" (Japanese: ヤマト空洞惑星に死す!?) | December 30, 1978 |
| 13 | "Fierce Attack! The Telezart Landing Operation!"; Transliteration: "Mōkō! Terezāto Jōriku Sakusen" (Japanese: 猛攻! テレザート上陸作戦) | January 6, 1979 |
| 14 | "Counterstrike! The Discovery of Trelaina!"; Transliteration: "Hangeki! Teresa o Hakken Seyo" (Japanese: 反撃! テレサを発見せよ) | January 13, 1979 |
| 15 | "Trelaina: the Beginning of Love"; Transliteration: "Teresa・Ai no Hajimaru" (Japanese: テレサ・愛のはじまり) | January 20, 1979 |
| 16 | "Trelaina: Farewell to Love!"; Transliteration: "Teresa・Ai to Wakare!" (Japanese: テレサ・愛と別れ) | January 27, 1979 |
| 17 | "Telezart - Disperse into Space!"; Transliteration: "Terezāto・Uchū ni Chiru!" (Japanese: テレザート・宇宙に散る!) | February 3, 1979 |
| 18 | "The Decisive Battle! All Ships, Combat-Ready!"; Transliteration: "Kessen・Zenkan Sentō Kaishi!" (Japanese: 決戦・全艦戦闘開始!) | February 10, 1979 |
| 19 | "Yamato--Collision in Warp!!"; Transliteration: "Yamato・Gekitotsu Wāpu!!" (Japanese: ヤマト・激突ワープ!!) | February 17, 1979 |
| 20 | "Yamato--A Daring Surprise Attack!"; Transliteration: "Yamato・Kishū ni Kakero!" (Japanese: ヤマト・奇襲に賭けろ!) | February 24, 1979 |
| 21 | "Courage: The Death Of Captain Gideon!"; Transliteration: "Sōretsu・Hijikata Kanchō no Shi!" (Japanese: 壮烈・土方艦長の死!) | March 3, 1979 |
| 22 | "Yamato, Fight to the Last!"; Transliteration: "Yamato・Tettei Kōsen Seyo!" (Japanese: ヤマト・徹底抗戦せよ!) | March 10, 1979 |
| 23 | "The Destined Showdown!"; Transliteration: "Shukumei no Taiketsu!" (Japanese: 宿命の対決!) | March 17, 1979 |
| 24 | "Life and Death Struggle! Two Brave Men!"; Transliteration: "Shitō Futari no Yūshi!" (Japanese: 死闘 二人の勇士!) | March 24, 1979 |
| 25 | "Strategic Invasion of the Imperial City!"; Transliteration: "Yamato Toshi Teikou Kōryaku Sakusen" (Japanese: ヤマト 都市帝国攻略作戦) | March 31, 1979 |
| 26 | "Be Forever, Yamato"; Transliteration: "Yamato yo Eien (Towa) ni" (Japanese: ヤマトよ永遠（とわ）に) | April 4, 1979 |
