= Wattoo Wattoo Super Bird =

- Genre: animated
- Written by: René Borg, Hubert Ballay
- Narrated by: Dorothée
- Composer: Hubert Ballay
- Country of origin: France
- Original languages: English (originally French)
- No. of episodes: 60

Production
- Producers: René Borg, Platforme 2000, Star Productions
- Running time: 5 Minutes

Original release
- Network: Antenne 2
- Release: 1978 – 1978

Wattoo Wattoo Super Bird is a French cartoon series created in 1978. Consisting of 60 five-minute episodes, the series was intended to teach morals to children.

== Plot ==
The eponymous Wattoo Wattoo is a black and white ovoid bird. He comes from a cube-shaped planet called Auguste. In the first episode he becomes aware of the very stupid and extremely wasteful race called Zwas. The Zwas are goose-like creatures (in French, "les Zwas" sounds like "les oies" = the geese) that live on the Earth in cities very much like our own. They have exaggerated human characteristics, they are irascible, badly behaved and generally thoughtless. However, the Zwas are not without kindness; many of them keep pets called Credo who are spheroid cats, dogs and other similar creatures. Often the actions of the Zwas puts the Credos in danger.

Throughout the series Wattoo Wattoo helps the Zwas overcome their problems through the use of his seemingly magical powers. He can shapeshift into any shape. Should he need the help of others of his race he has only to whistle. Other identical birds respond to the call and come down from space like comets. As they fly down they vibrate and duplicate themselves until they are a flock ready to take on whatever challenge is required of them.

== Cast ==
The series was written and directed by René Borg, co-written by Hubert Ballay and narrated by Dorothée in the original French language version.
