= Quaq Quao =

Animated television series

- Genre: Animation, Family
- Written by: Francesco Misseri
- Directed by: Francesco Misseri
- Theme music composer: Piero Barbetti
- Country of origin: Italy
- Original language: Onomatopoeia/gibberish (no language spoken)
- No. of episodes: 26

Production
- Running time: 5–6 minutes
- Production company: PMBB

Original release
- Network: Rete 2
- Release: September 1978 – June 1979

Quaq Quao is an Italian animated series for children ages 2–5 years based on the adventures of a duck.

The series consisted of 26 episodes of five to six minutes duration. It was filmed using stop-motion with origami figures and was written and directed by Francesco Misseri with music by Piero Barbetti. It was first broadcast in Italy in 1980, but as early as 1976 in other countries.

== Plot ==
Each episode is formulaic and has almost exactly the same plot. Quaq Quao is a white origami duck with a yellow beak. He is young, adventurous and a little bit cheeky.

Quaq Quao has a brief interaction with his mother, a larger version of himself, which seems to be a lesson, as he repeats the actions and quacks of his mother. He bids her farewell and heads off on his own for the day. He sings the Quaq Quao theme song and performs acrobatics in the water, generally having a good time before he meets the guest creature for the episode. The creature is usually another animal, although four of the creatures were a jack-in-the-box (The Bugbear - probably an Italian misunderstanding of what a bugbear is), a racecar, a cloud and a train. He quacks at the creature and behaves like a duck, and the creature makes sounds and behaves appropriately for its type.

The two are initially antagonistic towards each other and attempt to outsmart or outperform each other by one-upmanship, culminating in a shouting match where each tries to convince the other that their "language" is the proper one, but finally become friends and imitate each other by changing colour and/or minor changes in design, making each other's sounds, and behaving like each other. Quaq Quao swims back to his mother, all the while singing the theme tune in the style of the other creature.

He regains his normal appearance just before re-encountering his mother. When he returns, she greets him by quacking, and he responds by making the sounds of his new friend. His mother is alarmed and quacks again. Quaq Quao becomes slightly subdued, and he once again responds by quacking. His mother is satisfied, and the two swim off-screen together.

Just before the episode ends, Quaq Quao races back on screen and makes the sound of his friend again in defiance of his mother. He then races off-screen again to rejoin his mother.

Because there is no human dialogue, Quaq Quao, his mother and most of the creatures could be any gender, although one of the few intelligible words that Quaq Quao speaks is "Mama" near the end of each episode, after being reprimanded, implying that the parent duck is indeed Quaq Quao's mother.

== Animation ==
Because of the formulaic nature of the episodes, several economies of animation are possible. There are only a few versions of the following scenes:

- The initial "lesson" scene with his mother
- His outward journey
- The final scene with his mother

These scenes are used alternately in different episodes to give the impression of more animation than was actually created. All changes in his appearance are reverted just before he meets up with his mother again, so the final scene never needs to be customised for a particular episode, except for Quaq Quao making the sound of his new friend in a couple of places. This meant that the animators could focus their efforts on the animation for the individual interactions between Quaq Quao and the other creature.

== Episode list ==
Episode number	Title
1	The Small Donkey
2	The Lamb
3	The Horse
4	The Seal
5	The Monkey
6	The Bugbear
7	The Mouse
8	The Frog
9	The Racecar
10	The Piglet
11	The Parrot
12	The Cloud
13	The Cockerel
14	The Tiger
15	The Elephant
16	The Dove
17	The Robin
18	The Turkey
19	The Hen
20	The Hyena
21	The Little Train
22	The Bee
23	The Bull
24	The Cat
25	The Dog
26	The Wolf Cub

== In popular culture ==
The show's theme tune was sampled as part of "Quack Quack" by Rompeprop.
