= Ikkyū-san (manga) =

Japanese manga series

- Cover of Ikkyū-san volume 5

一球さん
- Genre: Sports
- Manga
- Written by: Shinji Mizushima
- Published by: Shogakukan
- Imprint: Shōnen Sunday Comics
- Magazine: Weekly Shōnen Sunday
- Original run: 1975 – 1977
- Volumes: 14
- Anime television series
- Directed by: Hiroshi Fukutomi
- Produced by: Ihiro Oba; Souichi Besshi
- Written by: Seiji Matsuoka; Ryuzo Nakanishi; Taketomi Oshima; Koichi Mitsuki
- Music by: Masahito Maruyama
- Studio: Nippon Animation
- Original network: FNS (Fuji TV)
- Original run: April 10, 1978 – October 23, 1978
- Episodes: 26

Ikkyū-san (Japanese: 一球さん, pronounced [ik̚kʲɨᵝːsã̠ɴ]), also known as Highschool Baseball Ninja, is a Japanese manga series written and illustrated by Shinji Mizushima. It was serialized in Shogakukan's Weekly Shōnen Sunday from 1975 to 1977, with its chapters collected in fourteen tankōbon volumes published by Shogakukan. An anime television series was adapted by Nippon Animation. It aired on Fuji TV from April 10 to October 23, 1978.

== Plot ==
High-school student Ikkyū Sanada knows nothing about baseball, but his talents are recognized by the manager of the baseball club, and he takes up the sport. While his ignorance of the game leads him to make many mistakes, Ikkyū—who is in fact a descendant of ninja—displays superhuman abilities and leads the team to the High School Baseball Championships.

== Characters ==
Ikkyū Sanada (真田 一球, Sanada Ikkyū)
Voiced by: Yu Mizushima
Reiko Ashida (芦田 麗子, Ashida Reiko)
Voiced by: Chiyoko Kawashima
Rentaro Gomi (五味 連太郎, Gomi Rentarō)
Voiced by: Shozo Iizuka
Shiro Ikkaku (一角 志郎, Ikkaku Shirō)
Voiced by: Masaya Taki
Iwakaze Kantoku (岩風 監督)
Voiced by: Akio Nojima
Chairman Sumiyoshi (住吉理事長, Sumiyoshi Riji-chō)
Voiced by: Ichiro Nagai
Miyoshi Hotta (堀田 三吉, Hotta Miyoshi)
Voiced by: Toshio Furukawa
Koji Tsukasa (司幸 司, Tsukasa Kōji)
Voiced by: Toru Furuya
Shun Otomo (大友 俊, Ōtomo Shun)
Voiced by: Kazuyuki Sogabe
