= Science Ninja Team Gatchaman: The Movie =

- Theatrical release poster
- Directed by: Hisayuki Toriumi
- Written by: Jinzō Toriumi; Satoru Suyama
- Based on: Science Ninja Team Gatchaman
- Produced by: Ippei Kuri; Katsumi Ueno
- Starring: Katsuji Mori; Isao Sasaki; Kazuko Sugiyama; Yoku Shioya; Shingo Kanemoto; Tōru Ōhira; Mikio Terashima; Nobuo Tanaka
- Edited by: Hajime Taniguchi
- Music by: Koichi Sugiyama
- Production company: Tatsunoko Production
- Distributed by: Shochiku; Shochiku Fuji
- Release date: May 12, 1978
- Running time: 110 minutes
- Country: Japan
- Language: Japanese

Science Ninja Team Gatchaman: The Movie (科学忍者隊ガッチャマン 劇場版, Kagaku Ninjatai Gatchaman: Gekijōban) is a 1978 Japanese anime superhero science fiction film and a version of the anime series of the same name.

== Plot ==
Sosai X traveled millions of light years to reach the planet Earth and creates a mutant Berg Katse. Thirty years later he is the leader of the terrorist organization known as Galactor. They want to conquer the world. Since Galactor controls the mechanical monster "Turtle King," the nations of the world live in fear.

Earth's only hope lies with five teenagers who can move like shadows. They are Gatchaman, five superheroes who arrive in their spaceship "God Phoenix" to stop Galactor's Machiavellian plans of world domination.

== Cast ==
Character	Japanese	English
Ken the Eagle (G1)	Katsuji Mori	Leraldo Anzaldua
Joe the Condor (G2)	Isao Sasaki	Brian Jepson
Jun the Swan (G3)	Kazuko Sugiyama	Kim Prause
Jinpei the Swallow (G4)	Yoku Shioya	Luci Christian
Ryu the Owl (G5)	Shingo Kanemoto	Victor Carsrud
Dr. Kozaburo Nambu	Toru Ohira	Andy McAvin
Red Impulse	Hisayoshi Yoshizawa	John Tyson
Berg Katse	Mikio Terashima	Edwin Neal
Leader X	Nobuo Tanaka	Charles C. Campbell
Director Anderson	Teiji Omiya	Marty Fleck
Sabu	Hiroya Ishimaru	Chris Patton
Narrator	Kiyoshi Kobayashi	George Manley

== Production ==
The movie is a feature-length retelling of the events of the TV series consisting primarily of footage from key episodes, namely the first two episodes, 51-53 (the V2 project arc) and the final four episodes. However, the first three minutes of the movie consists of newly animated footage depicting the arrival of Leader X on Earth and the birth of Berg Katse.

Instead of the music from the TV show by Bob Sakuma, an original score was composed by Koichi Sugiyama. It was notably the very first anime score to be performed by the NHK Symphony Orchestra.

== Other credits ==
- Kihachi Okamoto - Executive Producer
