= Ringing Bell =

1978 Japanese anime drama film

- Poster of the film

チリンの鈴 (Chirin no Suzu)
- Manga
- Written by: Takashi Yanase
- Published by: Froebel-Kan
- Published: 1978
- Anime film
- Directed by: Masami Hata
- Produced by: Shintaro Tsuji; Tsunemasa Hatano
- Written by: Takashi Yanase
- Music by: Taku Izumi; The Brothers Four
- Studio: Sanrio Films
- Licensed by: NA: Discotek Media
- Released: March 11, 1978 (Japan); April 8, 1983 (US)
- Runtime: 47 minutes

Ringing Bell (チリンの鈴, Chirin no Suzu; lit. Chirin's Bell) is a 1978 Japanese animated film adaptation of the storybook of the same name written by Takashi Yanase, the creator of Anpanman. It is most notable by fans and critics as a family film which makes a sharp, sudden turn into a dark and violent story that criticizes and reflects upon the theme of revenge and war.

Ringing Bell was produced by Sanrio and originally shown as a double feature alongside the US/Sanrio co-production The Mouse and his Child. It is Sanrio's first anime film to have a dark plot; only two films they co-produced with Sunrise, The Ideon: A Contact and The Ideon: Be Invoked – both of which serve as the conclusion to Yoshiyuki Tomino's Space Runaway Ideon – follow suit. It is among Sanrio's first works to be aimed at young adult audience members in and outside Japan.

== Synopsis ==
A young lamb named Chirin lives a carefree life with his flock on a farm. He is adventurous and prone to getting lost, so he wears a bell around his neck so his mother can always find him. She warns him that he must never venture beyond the farm's fence, or else he might be killed by the wolf that lives in the nearby mountains. Soon after, the wolf sneaks into the barn at night and kills the sheep, including Chirin's mother, just when she protected Chirin.

Seeking revenge, and disillusioned by the apathy from all the other sheep towards him over his mother's death, Chirin ultimately leaves the farm and pursues the wolf up the mountain for revenge. Over the course of his journey, he witnesses many sights and wonders while also discovering how fierce the world outside the farm is before eventually catching up with the wolf. However, he quickly realizes that he cannot fight him, and instead asks the wolf to train him to become strong. The wolf agrees, despite knowing Chirin intends to kill him one day. Over the course of this training, Chirin grows into a powerful, sure-footed, and fearless ram with deadly horns. Three years later, Chirin has transformed into a ruthless killer and thrown away his quest for vengeance; having come to view his mentor as a father figure and the mountains his new home. Together, they dominate the lands; killing anyone who dares to oppose them.

One day, the wolf takes him down to the farm that Chirin once came from; but does not see or accept it as his home anymore. After dealing with the guard dogs outside, the wolf orders Chirin to kill the sheep within himself; however, when another mother sheep throws herself on top of her lamb, Chirin's remembrance of his mother causes him to retreat. Despite Chirin's pleas, the wolf advances on the flock resolute to finish Chirin's training. The two fight, and Chirin fatally wounds the wolf with his horns. As he dies, the wolf confesses that while he accepted his death at the might of a stronger foe long ago, he is grateful that his student was the one to do so.

Despite saving them, Chirin is rejected by his terrified flock and is forced to return to the mountains; now alone. After hallucinating the wolf's return, Chirin laments that he has nowhere left to go, and no one else to love (or would love him), crying out in sorrow for the wolf to come back. Chirin is never seen again, but the faint ringing of his bell can still be heard on stormy nights, much like the howls of the lone wolves before him.

== Cast ==
- Minori Matsushima (Barbara Goodson in the English dub) as Chirin (チリン), a young, cheerful and innocent lamb who has no understanding of life and death. He always wears a bell around his neck.
  - Akira Kamiya (Gregg Berger in the English dub) voices Chirin as an adult ram. As a result of his quest to kill the wolf, he grows into an antelope-like ram with grey wool and long horns, but is rejected by his friends as a result of his monstrous appearance.
- Taeko Nakanishi (Alexandra Kenworthy in the English dub) as Chirin's mother, a ewe who is very loving towards her son Chirin. Her death at the paws of the Wolf sets the plot in motion.
- Seizō Katō (Bill Capizzi in the English dub) as the Wolf (ウォー Woe in the Japanese version), an aging black wolf with a scar across one eye. The wolf lives in the mountains surrounding the farm and kills and eats his prey based on the belief that he must continue the cycle of nature.
- Hitoshi Takagi and Ron Gans are the respective narrators of the Japanese version and English dub.

== Reception and legacy ==
Though the film is not as well known outside Japan, Western critics such as Justin Sevakis of Anime News Network praised the dark storyline and artwork, and noted that it delivered a "sort of quick punch-to-the-face of the innocent." Sevakis also commented that "there is almost nothing uplifting about Ringing Bell and yet it maintains its sense of adorable while simultaneously destroying our concepts of the beauty of nature."

Paul Lê reviewed the film for Bloody Disgusting, dubbing it "Nightmare Fuel for All Ages" in the review's title. Lê wrote, "Ringing Bell is a brutal watch at any age, especially today when cultural attitudes and standards regarding children's media have shifted," and concluded, "The [film's] goal here is not too clear, and adults will have a hard time breaking everything down for younger viewers."

The film was released on region 1 DVD in 2014 by Discotek Media and was also available on the Crunchyroll video streaming service, but as of July 2025 is no longer offered by that service.
