= Studio Mother =

Japanese animation studio

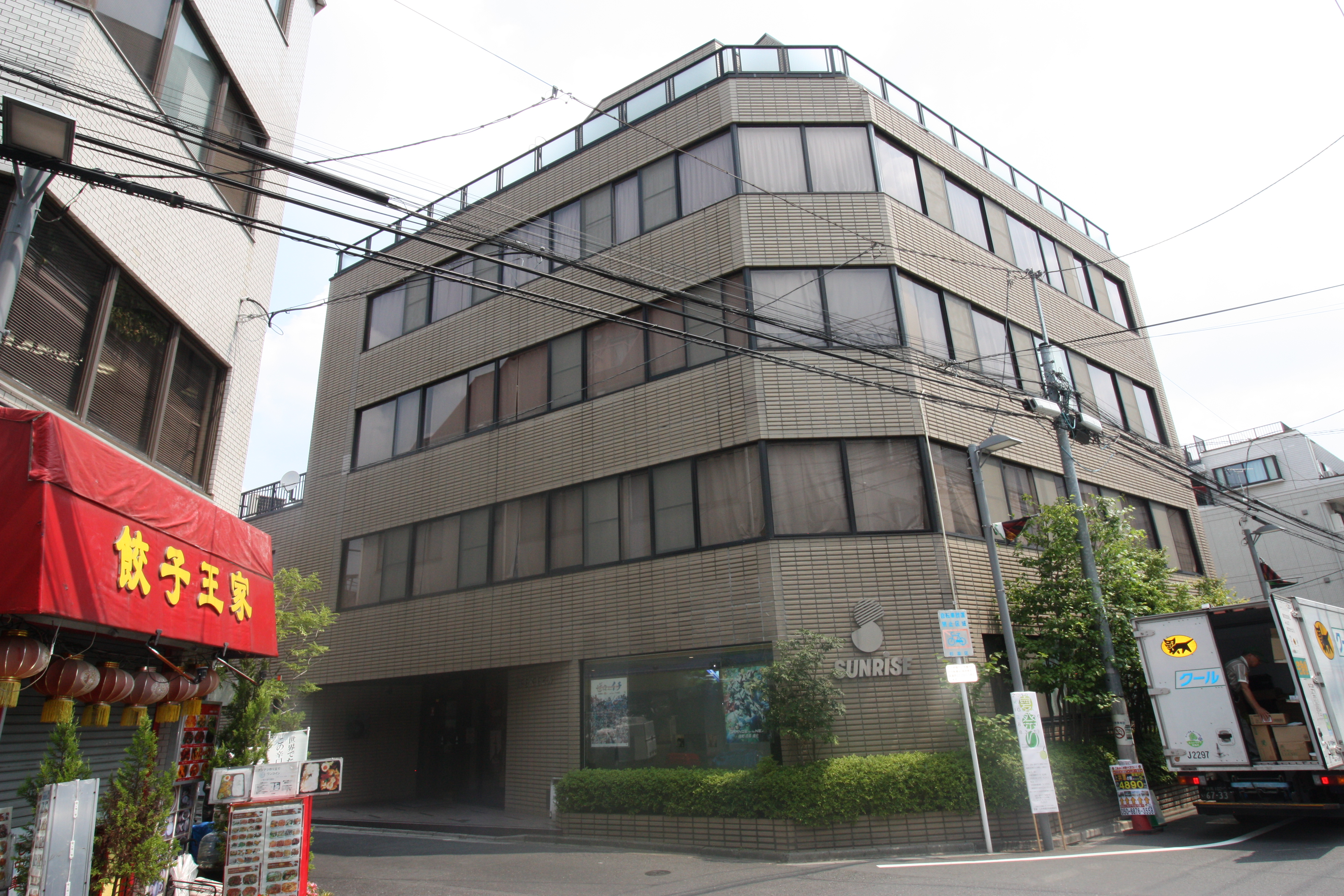
- The 2KI building, where Studio Mother's main studio is located
- Native name: 株式会社 Studio Mother
- Romanized name: Kabushiki-gaisha Sutajio Mazā
- Type: Kabushiki-gaisha
- Industry: Japanese animation
- Predecessor: Xebec
- Founded: May 2019; 7 years ago
- Headquarters: 1-8-5 Kami-Igusa, Suginami, Tokyo, Japan
- Key people: Kiyonori Hiramatsu
- Total equity: ¥ 64,000,000
- Number of employees: 57 (As of April 2025)
- Website: studio-mother.co.jp

Studio Mother Co., Ltd. (Japanese: 株式会社 Studio Mother(スタジオ・マザー), Hepburn: Kabushiki-gaisha Sutajio Mazā; stylized as studio Mother) is a Japanese animation studio based in Suginami, Tokyo. The studio was founded in 2019, and is composed of many staff from the former Xebec studio, the majority of whose assets were sold off by its parent IG Port to Sunrise.

== Establishment ==
The studio was founded in Suginami by Voyager Holdings in May 2019, and later received investments from Bandai Namco Arts, currently under the legal entity Bandai Namco Music Live to strengthen the development of the Space Battleship Yamato franchise through its partnership with copyright holder Voyager Holdings.

Studio Mother was led by Yukinao Shimoji, who was formerly a producer (and later CEO) of Xebec, until his passing in February 2022. Kiyonori Hiramatsu, the representative director of Asread and board member of Studio Mother, was appointed representative director of the company.

== Works ==
=== TV series ===
Title	Director(s)	First run start date	First run end date	Eps	Note(s)	Ref(s)
Arifureta: From Commonplace to World's Strongest Season 2	Akira Iwanaga	January 13, 2022	March 31, 2022	12	Based on a light novel by Ryo Shirakome. Co-produced with Asread.	
More Than a Married Couple, But Not Lovers	Takao Kato; Junichi Yamamoto	October 9, 2022	December 25, 2022	12	Based on a manga by Yūki Kanamaru.	
As a Reincarnated Aristocrat, I'll Use My Appraisal Skill to Rise in the World	Takao Kato	April 7, 2024	December 22, 2024	24	Based on a light novel by Miraijin A.	
There's No Freaking Way I'll be Your Lover! Unless...	Natsumi Uchinuma	July 8, 2025	September 23, 2025	12	Based on a light novel by Teren Mikami.	

=== Films ===
Title	Director(s)	Release date	Note(s)	Ref(s)
The "Space Battleship Yamato" Era: The Choice in 2202	Atsushi Sato	June 11, 2021	Recap film compiling Star Blazers 2199 and Star Blazers 2202.	
Star Blazers: Space Battleship Yamato 3199	Harutoshi Fukui; Naomichi Yamato	July 19, 2024	Sequel to Star Blazers 2205.	

=== Original net animations ===
Title	Director(s)	First run start date	First run end date	Eps	Note(s)	Ref(s)
Koala's Diary	Takao Kato	October 2, 2025	September 17, 2026	49	Based on a manga by Yuami.	
