= Space Battleship Yamato: Nijū Ginga no Hōkai =

2005 video game

- Developer: Bandai
- Publisher: Bandai
- Platform: PlayStation 2
- Release: JP: July 4, 2005
- Genre: Action
- Modes: Single-player, multiplayer

Space Battleship Yamato: Nijū Ginga no Hōkai (宇宙戦艦ヤマト二重銀河の崩壊, Uchū Senkan Yamato Nijū Ginga no Hōkai; Space Battleship Yamato: Collapse of the Double Galaxy) is the third game in the PS2 trilogy of Space Battleship Yamato games.
