= Space Battleship Yamato: Iscandar e no Tsuioku =

2004 video game

- Developer: Bandai
- Publisher: Bandai
- Platform: PlayStation 2
- Release: JP: October 6, 2004
- Genre: Action
- Modes: Single-player, multiplayer

Space Battleship Yamato: Iscandar e no Tsuioku (宇宙戦艦ヤマトイスカンダルへの追憶, Uchū Senkan Yamato Iscandar e no Tsuioku; Space Battleship Yamato: Reminiscences of Iscandar) is the first game in the PS2 trilogy of Space Battleship Yamato games.
