= Star Blazers: Space Battleship Yamato 3199 =

Japanese anime film series

- Star Blazers 3199
- Poster of the first film of the series

ヤマトよ永遠に REBEL3199 (Yamato yo Towa ni: Rebel 3199)
- Genre: Adventure; Military science fiction; Space opera
- Created by: Leiji Matsumoto; Yoshinobu Nishizaki
- Anime film series

Theatrical Edition
- Directed by: Harutoshi Fukui; Naomichi Yamato
- Produced by: Hideto Furuichi
- Written by: Harutoshi Fukui (Note: Series composition and screenplay); Hideki Oka (Note: Screenplay)
- Music by: Shu Kanematsu; Akira Miyagawa; Hiroshi Miyagawa
- Studio: Studio Mother (Note: Movies 1–3); Satelight (Note: Movies 4–7)
- Released: July 19, 2024 – October 30, 2026
- Films: 7
- Original net animation

TV Edition
- Directed by: Harutoshi Fukui; Naomichi Yamato
- Produced by: Hideto Furuichi
- Written by: Harutoshi Fukui; Hideki Oka
- Music by: Shu Kanematsu; Akira Miyagawa; Hiroshi Miyagawa
- Studio: Studio Mother (Note: Episodes 1–10); Satelight (Note: Episodes 11–26)
- Licensed by: Crunchyroll
- Released: July 19, 2024 – October 30, 2026
- Episodes: 26
- Related
- Star Blazers 2199 (2012 film series); Star Blazers 2202 (2017 film series); Star Blazers 2205 (2021 film series)

Star Blazers 3199, known in Japan as Be Forever Yamato: Rebel 3199 (Japanese: ヤマトよ永遠に REBEL3199, Hepburn: Yamato yo Towa ni: Rebel 3199), is a Japanese military science fiction animated film series produced by Studio Mother and Satelight. The series is a sequel to Star Blazers: Space Battleship Yamato 2205 and a remake of both Be Forever Yamato and Space Battleship Yamato III, originally based on the Space Battleship Yamato television series created by Yoshinobu Nishizaki and Leiji Matsumoto. The series was released in theatres and on TV streaming simultaneously, with a total of seven films running for twenty-six episodes. The first film was released on July 19, 2024 and the last on October 30, 2026.

== Synopsis ==
=== Setting ===
The story of the series is set in the year of 2207, and transitions to the year 3199.

== Characters ==
=== 65th Escort Corps former members ===
Susumu Kodai (古代 進, Kodai Susumu)
Voiced by: Daisuke Ono
Yuki Mori (森 雪, Mori Yuki)
Voiced by: Houko Kuwashima
Shirō Sanada (真田志郎, Sanada Shirō)
Voiced by: Hōchū Ōtsuka
Daisuke Shima (島 大介, Shima Daisuke)
Voiced by: Kenichi Suzumura
Ryusuke Domon (土門竜介, Domon Ryusuke)
Voiced by: Tasuku Hatanaka
Tasuke Tokugawa (徳川太助, Tokugawa Tasuke)
Voiced by: Nobuhiko Okamoto
Heiji Bando (板東平次, Bando Heiji)
Voiced by: Wataru Hatano
Miyako Kyozuka (京塚みやこ, Kyozuka Miyako)
Voiced by: Tomo Muranaka
Shigeru Sakamoto (坂本 茂, Sakamoto Shigeru)
Voiced by: Kent Itō
Caroline Raiden (キャロライン雷電, Kyarorain Raiden)
Voiced by: Chitose Morinaga
Tetsuya Kitano (北野哲也, Kitano Tetsuya)
Voiced by: Ryuichi Kijima
Yasuo Nanbu (南部康雄, Nanbu Yasuo)
Voiced by: Kenji Akabane
Kenjiro Ohta (太田健二郎, Ohta Kenjiro)
Voiced by: Yuki Chiba
Yoshikazu Aihara (相原義一, Aihara Yoshikazu)
Voiced by: Masato Kokubun
Shuzo Sado (佐渡酒造, Sado Shuzo)
Voiced by: Shigeru Chiba
Toru Hoshina (星名 透, Hoshina Toru)
Voiced by: Motoki Takagi
Yuria Hoshina (星名百合亜, Hoshina Yuria)
Voiced by: Aya Uchida
Hiroki Shinohara (篠原弘樹, Shinohara Hiroki)
Voiced by: Daisuke Hirakawa
Miki Saijo (西条未来, Saijo Miki)
Voiced by: Satomi Moriya
Shiori Nagakura (永倉志織, Nagakura Shiori)
Voiced by: Kazusa Amagai
Kiryu Mikage (桐生美影, Mikage Kiryu)
Voiced by: Eriko Nakamura

=== Earth Defense Force leadership ===
Kotetsu Serizawa (芹沢虎鉄, Serizawa Kotetsu)
Voiced by: Tesshō Genda
Heikuro Todo (藤堂平九郎, Todo Heikuro)
Voiced by: Toshihiko Kojima
Shino Todo (藤堂信乃, Todo Shino)
Voiced by: Tomoko Shiota

=== Earth Defense Force other members ===
Saki Todo (藤堂早紀, Todo Saki)
Voiced by: Ayahi Takagaki
Seiya Kitano (北野誠也, Kitano Seiya)
Voiced by: Kohsuke Toriumi
Takeshi Ageha (揚羽 武, Ageha Takeshi)
Voiced by: Yūto Uemura
Megumi Kanzaki (神崎 恵, Kanzaki Megumi)
Voiced by: Megumi Hayashibara
Mina Ichinose (市瀬美奈, Ichinose Mina)
Voiced by: Tomoyo Kurosawa
Urara Kusakabe (日下部うらら, Kusakabe Urara)
Voiced by: Arisa Komiya
AU09 New Analyzer (AU09 新アナライザー, AU zero kyū shin anaraizā)
Voiced by: Chō

=== Earthling civilians ===
Kozo Nanbu (南部康造, Nanbu Kozo)
Voiced by: Shinobu Matsumoto
Jiro Shima (島 次郎, Shima Jiro)
Voiced by: Anan Furuya
Makoto Kato (加藤真琴, Kato Makoto)
Voiced by: Rina Satō
Tsubasa Kato (加藤 翼, Kato Tsubasa)
Voiced by: Natsumi Takamori
Yoshiro Kosaka (香坂芳郎, Kosaka Yoshiro)
Voiced by: Mitsuo Iwata

=== Dezarium army ===
Alphon (アルフォン, Arufon)
Voiced by: Makoto Furukawa
Isidore (イジドール, Ijidōru)
Voiced by: Shun Horie
Lambell (ランベル, Ranberu)
Voiced by: Takuya Eguchi
Skulldart (スカルダート, Sukarudāto)
Voiced by: Naoya Uchida
Sada (サーダ, Sāda)
Voiced by: Marina Inoue

=== Bolar Federation ===
Vilke Boroze (ヴィルキ・ボローズ, Vuiruki Borōzu)
Voiced by: Satoshi Taki
Ciev Revals (チェフ・レバルス, Chefu Rebarusu)
Voiced by: Takeshi Maruyama
Djerba Gdan (ジェルバ・グダン, Jeruba Gudan)
Voiced by: Tetsu Inada

== Production ==
The project was announced in January 2022 as a sequel to Star Blazers: Space Battleship Yamato 2202. It was later revealed to be a seven-part film series. The series was also released on TV, running for a total of twenty-six episodes. The series is animated by Studio Mother, featuring a combination of returning and new casts and staff members. The series is directed by Harutoshi Fukui and Naomichi Yamato, with Shōji Nishizaki as producers and Harutoshi Fukui as scriptwriter. Crunchyroll licensed the series.

== Release ==
The first film was released on July 17, 2024. The second film was released on November 22, 2024. Its ending theme is performed by Daisuke Ono.

No.	Title (Note: The English titles were taken from IMDb.)	Original release date
Part 1: Dark Invasion
1	"Begin the Secret Operation! Head for the New Yamato!"; Transliteration: "Himitsu sakusen hatsudō! Yamato e mukae!!" (Japanese: 秘密作戦発動！ ヤマトへ向かえ!!)	July 19, 2024
Two years after the destruction of Iscandar, the original Yamato crew is split up to various positions. As an unknown ship enters the Solar System, Yasuo and his friends steal top secret information from Nanbu Industries and find evidence of a government conspiracy. Onboard the Ginga, Kodai prepares to formally propose to Yuki to marry her as well as adopt Sasha as their child. The Ginga itself is on a mission to use the Cosmo Reverse system to rebuild Saturn after its destruction during the war with Gatlantis. Upon detecting the unknown ship, Earth attempts to mount a defense, but the ship proves to be immune to wave motion weaponry. Yuki also notices that Earth leadership is not committing its full forces, and she suspects they already knew about the ship's arrival. The ship lands just outside of Earth's capital while escorted by Dezarium ships. Suddenly, all former Yamato crew members receive a transmission urging them to rally at the Yamato, which is Earth's last hope.
2	"The Silent Invasion! Ginga, Take Up Your Arms!"; Transliteration: "Shizukanaru shinryaku ginga yo buki o tore!" (Japanese: 静かなる侵略・銀河よ武器をとれ！)	July 19, 2024
The Dezarium begin their invasion of Earth's capital, though mysteriously only a few Earth military units attempt to resist them. The intelligence director Shiino then broadcasts a report stating that the Dezarium are not their enemy. Director Todo reveals to Yuki that due to Dezarium's technological superiority, they have no choice but to fake their surrender, and orders her to escape. Kodai pilots a transport craft to survey the situation at the capital but is shot down, but he manages to reunite with Yuki. Rallying with other Yamato crew members at Okita's grave, Kodai and Yuki receive new orders to be extracted at the hangar underneath the presidential residence. However, as the crew evacuates, they are ambushed by Dezarium soldiers and Yuki is wounded and accidentally left behind. In space, the Ginga attempts to cover the escape of the Asuka, but cannot get its weapons operational due to Cosmo Reverse. However, Kanzaki inexplicably resonates with the Cosmo Reverse and it fires a single volley that allows the Asuka to warp to safety, while the Ginga itself is damaged and crash lands on the Moon. As more Dezarium ships arrive in Earth's orbit, their leader declares that they have returned home while Yuki is found by a Dezarium soldier.
Part 2: Red Sun Sortie
3	"Shocking! The Dezarium's Dark Millennium of History!"; Transliteration: "Shokkingu! Dezariumu no ankoku Chitose no rekishi!" (Japanese: ショッキング！デザリウムの暗黒千年の歴史!)	November 22, 2024
The Hyuuga is intercepted by Dezarium ships, but is not fired upon and the crew are confused when they see their IFF declares them as friendly. On the Asuka, the crew are worried that Kodai will be unable to act as captain due to the loss of Yuki, and Captain Kitano advises him that he cannot afford to show weakness when he takes command of the Yamato. Yuki awakens to find herself in Dezarium custody while their representative Skulldart makes a public speech, explaining that the Dezarium are actually humans from the year 3199. However, due to numerous galactic wars and overuse of wave motion weaponry, a space time rift in Saturn's former location was torn open and devastated Earth and the universe. The future humans were forced to become cyborgs to survive, and used the rift to time travel back to 2207 in hopes of averting the tragedy with the massive ship they landed on Earth, the Grand Reverse. He also admits many Earth government officials have agreed to accept Dezarium. The speech is interrupted as a Bolar Federation fleet invades the Solar System to investigate Dezarium's use of the "Light of Uralia". The Bolar fleet is easily repelled by the Dezarium, and the Bolar fleet commander is convinced they possess the Light of Uralia. Dezarium's open show of force to defend Earth quickly wins public approval among humanity.
4	"Fire the Starting Gun! The New Battleship Yamato Comes to Life!"; Transliteration: "Sutātāgan o hassha seyo! Shinsenkan'yamato ga yomigaeru!" (Japanese: スターターガンを発射せよ！新戦艦大和が甦る！)	November 22, 2024
Dezarium attempts to confiscate the Ginga as well as Kanzaki, who was rendered comatose in the crash, stating that they are now officially part of the Earth government. However, since the Ginga crashed in a Gamilas diplomatic zone, Captain Todo uses that as a pretext to refuse their orders. Meanwhile, the Asuka arrives at the abandoned Icarus Observatory where the Yamato has been secretly stored. Kodai is reunited with Sanada and Commander Yamanami, and is surprised to see Sasha present as well, but his trauma over Yuki's loss prevents him from getting close to her. Yuki meets Alphon, a Dezarium intelligence officer who is willing to trade her information about Dezarium to win her trust. He claims Gamilas and Iscandar would have been destroyed by the Bolar in the future anyways, so they did not see any reason not to destroy Gamilas so they could transport Iscadar back to their own time. Sanada explains to Kodai that Earth leadership knew about Dezarium's true nature, but split into pro and anti-Dezarium factions. Furthermore, the Dezarium need both the Yamato and Sasha to complete the Grand Reverse, as they are the last remnants of Iscandar's technology. A Dezarium battleship then attacks the observatory, but the Yamato launches and destroys it with new wave motion shells that counter its shields.
5	"Fierce Clash! Destroy the Invincible Battleship!"; Transliteration: "Gekitotsu muteki senkan o hakai seyo!" (Japanese: 激突！無敵戦艦を破壊せよ！)	November 22, 2024
Yamato moves to the edge of the Solar System to investigate the fate of the Earth fleet that made first contact with Dezarium, only to find all crew members seemed to have suffered some type of mental regression due to contact with Grand Reverse. Meanwhile, Dezarium begins shipping migrants to Earth to aid in the development of Grand Reverse. Sanada comes to the conclusion that the Grand Reverse is actually a hyperon bomb, and when it detonates it will "reformat" the brains of all humans on Earth, allowing the Dezarium to take their bodies. A Dezarium battleship commanded by Ranbel then arrives and attacks the Yamato, but the ship has trouble fighting back due to Ranbel's ship possessing a cloaking system. Working together, the Yamato crew uses the wave motion weaponry of the Asuka and a derelict Earth warship to disable the cloaking system. Realizing he is at a disadvantage, Ranbel retreats. Yamanami decides the Yamato will cross the spacetime rift at the galactic core and sail to Dezarium to confirm if they really are future humans, but having lost faith in Kodai's ability to command, he demotes him and orders him to return to Earth on the Asuka.
6	"Alphon Infiltrates! Get Back Sasha!"; Transliteration: "Arufon sen'nyū! Sāsha o torimodose!" (Japanese: アルフォン潜入！サーシャを取り戻せ！)	November 22, 2024
Kodai petitions Yamanami to stay on the Yamato as the tactical officer, but Yamanami refuses, pointing out Kodai is too distracted thinking about Yuki and cannot commit to the mission. Kodai voluntarily boards the Asuka against the protests of Domon and the rest of the crew, including Sasha. Meanwhile on Earth, the Dezarium begin confiscating the wave motion cores of all of the Earth warships under construction. Alphon asks Yuki what she would do if Kodai were to be killed, and she coldly replies she would find a way to kill Alphon no matter what. Alphon transfers his mind to a spare body on Ranbel's ship and ambushes the Yamato again. However, the attack is a ruse to cover Alphon secretly boarding the Yamato and he manages to capture Sasha and Niimi. Hearing of the attack, Kodai returns but is unable to stop Alphon from escaping. Kodai tries to have the Yamato pursue Alphon, but Yamanami points out they have no way of tracking Dezarium's stealth technology and reminds Kodai he is no longer the captain. Kodai then realizes that the rest of the crew has lost faith in him for abandoning the ship.
Part 3: Aquamarine Asteroid
7	"The Terrible Orfevre Zone! Yamato, Bet It All on a Surprise Attack!"; Transliteration: "Ma no orufe chū-iki Yamato, kishū ni kakero!" (Japanese: 魔のオルフェ宙域・ヤマト、奇襲に賭けろ！)	April 11, 2025
In order to foster better relations, the Dezarium propose integrating Dezarium children in human schools, where the Dezarium girl Frulul meets Makoto's son Tsubasa. Tsubasa later goes out of his way to protect Frulul from bullies. In space, Yamanami decides that the Yamato will take a Gamilan subspace gate as a shortcut to the galactic core and bypass Bolar Federation space. However, they will need to pass through the hazardous Orfevre Zone first. Kodai carefully studies the movements of the stealth battleship and decides to transfer to the Yamato's fighter wing. Ranbel attempts to ambush the Yamato, hoping to capture it, but is caught off guard when the Yamato turns the tables on him with the use of decoys and a modified radar that can counter his ship's stealth. Alphon orders Ranbel to retreat and they escape. Sasha and Niimi are successfully transferred to another Dezarium ship while Alphon decides to return to Earth to deal with the human resistance.
8	"Activate the Space Battleship Arizona! Reveal the true nature of the Dezarium!"; Transliteration: "Uchū senkan Arizona shidō! Dezariamu no shōtai o abake!!" (Japanese: 宇宙戦艦アリゾナ始動！ デザリアムの正体を暴け!!)	April 11, 2025
During art class, Frulul is asked to draw what she is feeling, and she decides to draw a picture of Tsubasa. At Chairman Ageha's museum, Yasuo and the resistance prepare to broadcast the truth about the Dezarium to all of Earth, but they need access to Grand Reverse. They commandeer the partially complete battleship Arizona and have it fire on the Grand Reverse as a distraction while Air Cavalry troops infiltrate it from underground. Yasuo and the Air Cavalry publicly crash a party being held on the Grand Reverse, where Yasuo reveals the effects Grand Reverse has on humans and raises the issue of the Grandfather Paradox, threatening to burn the The Starry Night painting in the present time to prove the one in Dezarium's possession is fake. However, Skulldart makes a charismatic and convincing argument that raises doubts about the validity of the Grandfather Paradox, and the resistance members in charge of destroying The Starry Night cannot bring themselves to destroy a important cultural piece. Skulldart also claims the brain damage caused by the Grand Reverse was an accident, and that Dezarium medical technology can cure it. The Asuka covers the resistance's retreat but is captured, and public opinion of the Dezarium only increases. Seeing these developments, Yamanami decides to continue on to Dezarium.
9	"Friendship torn apart! Yamato, break through the subspace gate at all costs!" Transliteration: "Hikisaka reta yūjō! Yamato, kesshi no A kūkan toppa! !" (Japanese: 引き裂かれた友情！ ヤマト、決死の亜空間突破!!)	April 11, 2025
Gamilan citizens, angry over the destruction of their homeplanet at Dezarium's hands, begin staging terrorist attacks on the capital. This causes a resurgence of deep seated resentment and hate against the Gamilans. Realizing that this is a ploy to destroy the Earth-Gamilas alliance, the Gamilan ambassador requests to the Earth President to issue an order to banish all Gamilans from Earth to prevent further incidents and to preserve the anti-Dezarium President's legitimacy. Yuki meanwhile learns Alphon uses mind transference to switch bodies whenever he has to travel vast distances, but he will die if his original body is killed. The Yamato heads for the subspace gate but is intercepted by Dezarium forces. Alphon gets into a fighter duel with Kodai and fighter pilot Takeshi Ageha protects Kodai at the cost of damage to his craft. Having delayed the Yamato long enough, Alphon and his forces withdraw, allowing Yamato and its fighters to enter the gate while Ranbel secretly follows them. In subspace, Takeshi's fighter falls behind and loses navigation. Sanada proposes using a rare application of the pure wave motion core to have Domon communicate with Takeshi telepathically and guide him back to the ship. Domon is successful, and Takeshi rejoins the formation. However, as the Yamato reaches the other end of the gate, Ranbel fires his ship's main cannon at the Gamilan fleet waiting on the other side.
10	"The Fierce Attack of the Deusura-III! The Terrible Operation Asteroid!"; Transliteration: "Deusūra III mōkō! Kyōi no asuteroido sakusen!!" (Japanese: デウスーラIII猛攻！ 驚異のアステロイド作戦!!)	April 11, 2025
Believing the Yamato is in league with the Dezarium, the Gamilan fleet led by the Deusura attacks. Unwilling to fight the Gamilans, Kodai suggests the Yamato flee until they find a chance to clear up the misunderstanding. The Deusura proves to be willing to use everything at its disposal, including the Desler Cannon to try and destroy the Yamato. Domon and his friends volunteer to take the Cosmo Hound to deploy magnetic bouys that attract numerous asteroids to the Deusura's hull, completely disabling it. However, the Cosmo Hound is struck by debris is a dives into subspace, damaging it and causing it to sink further into subspace. They are rescued by Frakken, who happened to be in the area with his dimensional submarine, and he orders the Deusura to stand down. The Yamato is then personally invited by Desler to visit Galman. On Earth, the Dezariam continue with their plans despite the setback. Shiino assures them the resistance won't be a threat since they have Kitano as a mole. At Galman, Desler awaits the arrival of Yamato alongside Sasha, who is now a young woman.
Part 4: Light Blue Maiden (Sasha)
11	"Sasha, a Reunion Across Time" (Japanese: サーシャ・時を超えた再会)	October 10, 2025
With the planet Barth suffering from global cooling, they decide to send their fleet led by General Ram to attack Galman to win favor with the Bolar Federation. Meanwhile, Kodai meets Sasha on Galman, and she explains that she was supposed to be sent to Dezarium after she was captured, but instead of arriving in 3199 as planned she arrived 15 years earlier in 3184. She was later able to escape Dezarium and was rescued by the Gamilans but Niimi was killed during the escape. On Earth, the Dezarium reveal this information as well, saying they needed to send the infant Sasha through the spacetime rift so as not to cause a paradox. However, with the future Sasha meeting the Yamato crew, they are unsure of what will happen. On Galman, the crew learns that the planet is also suffering from global cooling, and like wave motion energy, Gamilan Gestham engines are starting to lose effectiveness. On the way to meeting Desler, Kodai learns Galman houses hundreds of intact Iscandarian battleships, but they lack the wave motion cores to operate them. Ram's fleet then attacks Galman, with Ram attempting a suicide attack on Galman's capital. In order to stop him, the Yamato overloads its wave motion core to disable his ship. The energy wave generated by the Yamato's overload then causes the Iscandarian ships and ruins under Galman to activate.
12	"Frulul's Day Off" (Japanese: フルールの休日)	October 10, 2025
As the Gamilan citizens are expelled from Earth, Tsubasa shows Frulul his father's grave and Makoto meets Frulul's father Maxim. As the Gamilans begin exploring the newly activated Iscandarian ruins, Sanada shows Kodai a recording left behind by Niimi, and Sasha reveals Niimi was able to create a program that can rewrite the code of Mother Dezarium, the AI that commands the entire Dezarium race. However, Sasha becomes frustrated at Kodai's hesitation, correctly realizing he truly wants to return to Earth to find Yuki. On Earth, Frulul spends a whole day with Tsubasa and Makoto to visit Tsubasa's grandfather. Alphon and Maxim reflect on their role in fulfilling Mother Dezarium's plan, and it revealed that they and Ranbel are the last three "non-standard" Dezarium who can feel human emotions. On Galman, an imprisoned Ram is secretly contacted by his superiors, who ask him for his flagship's self destruct code to disable Galman's defenses so they can attack the planet with a planet destroyer missile. Ram balks at the plan until he is reminded Barth is reliant on aid from the Bolar Federation.
13	"All Ships, Sortie! Eliminate the Planet Destroyer Missile!" (Japanese: 全艦隊出動！ 惑星破壊ミサイルを撃滅せよ!!)	October 10, 2025
A gala is held at the Ageha Museum to further promote Earth-Dezarium relations. Makoto, Tsubasa, and Frulul are in attendance as well as Yuki and Alphon. However, Alphon cryptically tells Yuki to stay away from Hall 2, but is alarmed when he learns Tsubasa and Frulul have gone missing. The two children wander into Hall 2, and Alphon quickly removes them. Outside, it is revealed that the pro-Dezarium faction has plotted with Dezarium to stage a false flag terrorist attack on Hall 2 to discredit the resistance. Alphon is barely able to save Tsubasa and Frulul, but is caught in the blast, though Yuki pulls him from the rubble. On Galman, Ram has a change of heart and warns the Gamilans about the Bolar Federation's plot, and the self destruction of his flagship is averted. The Yamato and Gamilan fleet mobilize to intercept the planet destroyer missile but are unsure where it will attack from. Sasha insists she knows where it will appear, but the crew begins to doubt her until Kodai lies about detecting the missile to support her. Sasha's prediction proves to be correct and the Yamato shoots down the planet destroyer missile. Back on Earth, the terrorist attack at the museum causes another surge of public support for Dezarium while the government uses it as a pretext to institute martial law.
14	"Enter the Dark Gas Clouds! Chase the Witch of Uralia!" (Japanese: 暗黒ガス雲突入！ ウラリアの魔女を追え!!)	October 10, 2025
Ram is interrogated, and he reveals that both Galman and Barth are being affected by an astrological phenomenon the Bolar Federation calls the "Witch of Uralia", which freezes large sections of space. He reveals that the source of the Witch of Uralia is officially located in the galactic core, but a similar effect is emanating from the Ganel Nebula. Desler decides to send a fleet as well as the Yamato to investigate the nebula. The crew ask Sasha to man the radar due to her enhanced senses, but she insists they stop should wasting time and head directly to Dezarium before angrily storming out. After having a discussion with Ram and Yabu's family, Sasha has a change of heart and formally joins the Yamato crew. As the Yamato leaves with Frakken's submarine Zerendal, Yanbel is ordered to prevent them from investigating the Witch. In subspace, the Yamato is attacked by Dezarium tentacles, with the Zerendal destroying them, but it is disabled in the process and begins sinking into subspace. Sasha uses her senses to guide Kodai in firing the Wave Motion Gun to eject the Zerendal back into regular space. Sasha also confides to Kodai she wants to return to Dezarium due to her guilt over leaving behind Niimi to die. Both the Yamato and Zerndal return to regular space, where they discover the Witch is in fact a massive Dezarium space station.
Part 5: White Heat Galactic War
15	"Fight to the Last! Protect the Immigrant Fleet!" (Japanese: 徹底抗戦・移民船団を守れ！)	February 20, 2026
The Bolar Federation learns about the investigation in the Ganel Nebula through their spies, and instruct a fleet to retrieve Ram at any cost. Ram tells the Yamato crew and Gamilans that the Witch is an ancient Bolar myth used to justify their expansionism due to their home system slowly freezing. However, there is evidence the Witch does indeed exist that the Bolar Federation has covered up. They also study the Dezarium phase armor and find out that they rely on power transmitted from the planet Dezarium itself, which is relayed through the space station in the Ganel Nebula. If it can be destroyed, it will cripple the Dezarium fleet. They then receive word of the Bolar Federation attacking the convoy transporting the Gamilan exiles from Earth to Galman and help the Gamilans capture the Bolar fleet. They are also reunited with the Hyuga and its crew. Ram volunteers to take the Bolar prisoners back to the Bolar homeworld, as he plans to petition the Bolar leader Bemlarze for assistance. On Earth, Yuki realizes that Alphon truly feels sadness for the atrocities he has committed, but he remains dedicated to his mission to save the future.
16	"The Climactic Battle! Take Down the Dezarium Fortress" (Japanese: 決戦・デザリアム要塞を攻略せよ！)	February 20, 2026
On Earth, Dezarium organizes a Dezarium Supporters Club to enforce peace now that the police and military have been discredited. Tooru approaches Makoto and asks her to spy on the Supporter Club but she refuses in order to protect Tsubasa. In space, Ram is able to convince Bemlarze to grant him a personal audience. The combined Earth-Gamilas fleet attacks the space station, destroying one of the Golba-class battleships protecting it while submarines sever the phase energy lines in subspace, disabling the space station's phase shield. However, Alphon and Ranbel thwart the fleet's efforts to destroy the second Golba-class battleship, which reactivates the space station's phase shield. Both Kodai and several fighters are trapped behind the shield and Kodai is forced to land on the station where he is confronted by Alphon.
17	"The Universe Revives, Awaken! Super Yamato!" (Japanese: よみがえる宇宙・目覚めよ超（スーパー）ヤマト)	February 20, 2026
Seeing that Kodai is willing to die to destroy the space station, Alphon points out the remaining Golba cannot power the phase shield indefinitely and the Earth-Gamilas fleet will inevitably prevail. He is willing to give up the space station if Kodai allows him to evacuate the crew. They both head to the bridge, but they are both surprised to find nobody there. Alphon comes to the realization that the majority of the Dezarium forces are likely just automated AI controlled directly by Mother Dezarium. He then attempts to kill Kodai, but is interrupted by the arrival of a Bolar fleet led by Ram, who destroy the second Golba. Seeing that the battle is lost, Alphon spares Kodai's life and tells him Yuki is waiting for him on Earth before retreating. The space station's core is destroyed, demolishing the entire station and reversing the freezing effect. This also triggers a reaction in the Yamato's wave motion core, unlocking its full power. With both Galman and Barth saved, the Yamato continues on to the spacetime rift.
18	"Chain Warp! Yamato, Cross Over Time!" (Japanese: 連続ワープ！ ヤマト、時間を超えろ!!)	February 20, 2026
The Dezarium are encouraged at the fact the Yamato's capabilities as a fragment of Iscandar are exceeding their expectations, but are aware that their original plans have been derailed. The Hyuga prepares to return to Earth to inform the resistance of the Dezariums' weakness. Learning of this, Shiino orders Kitano to sink the Hyuga over a residential area and make it look like a terrorist attack, despite the fact that his brother is onboard. Alphon falls into a coma due to his mind transference being incomplete, so Yuki volunteers to help awaken him. She enters Alphon's transfer pod and manages to view some of his memories, and he is successfully awakened. However, Alphon's assistant suddenly attacks Yuki, claiming his family was killed aboard the space station. Alphon subdues him, insisting the station was unmanned. At the Moon, the Hyuga crew already suspects Kitano is a spy and he shoots down their ship, but makes sure to do so in an area where the Ginga crew can recover them. On Earth, Alphon comes to the realization the rest of the Dezarium have had their memories rewritten to believe the Yamato committed war crimes, while the Earth government spreads propaganda of the same. The Yamato prepares to enter the spacetime rift, which requires precise positioning and timing. With the new super charger capability, the Yamato is able to warp up to six times in succession. They successfully enter the rift, but instead of traveling to the future, they end up in the past.
Part 6: Azure Labyrinth
19	"July 21, 2026 - The Yamato Appears in Tokyo" (Japanese: 令和八年七月二十一日・ヤマト東京へ現る)	June 26, 2026
The Yamato finds themselves over Tokyo in the year 2026. They decide to flee when JSDF fighter planes attempt to intercept them and escape into orbit. The crew are nervous that their presence has disrupted the past and may cause further conflict, so they decide to contact Ryoichi Saito, a diplomat who happens to be the ancestor of one of the crew. Saito is shown the future 200 years, and he agrees to help. In 2207, the resistance broadcasts evidence of Dezariam's wrongdoings and insists the Yamato will bring hope, and begin their offensive to end the occupation. Alphon runs away with Yuki, now wondering whether his memories about Dezarium being the future Earth were all a fabrication by Mother Dezarium. Alphon's assistant Isidor later visits Maxim, and insists they remove their com-medals in order to see if Alphon's suspicions that Mother Dezarium is rewriting their memories is true or not.
20	"The Stolen Yamato - The Choice of 2026" (Japanese: 奪われたヤマト・西暦2026年の選択)	June 26, 2026
Skulldart continues to spread propaganda that Yamato is in the wrong, which creates an anti-Yamato fervor that results in Okita's grave being desecrated. Yuki and Alphon meanwhile seek shelter with Makoto. In 2026, Domon suggests that they use this opportunity to intervene in Gamilas' unification wars and unite them with Galman before the Bolar Federation is formed, which will hopefully avert the disastrous war with Gamilas in the future. However, the senior officers turn him down, not wanting to interfere with the past. As Yamanami and Sanada leave the ship to have an audience with the Japanese Prime Minister, Domon and his friends lead a mutiny and seize the Yamato. Kodai decides to join the mutiny, feeling it is his duty to stay onboard the Yamato. While observing the wave motion core, Sasha has a troubling vision of Starsha before returning to her quarters to retrieve a set of com-medals.
21	"Terrifying! The Black Space Battleship Yamato!" (Japanese: 戦慄！ 黒い宇宙戦艦ヤマト!!)	June 26, 2026
Yuki and Alphon are extracted by the resistance, but Makoto and Tsubasa are arrested for aiding them. In 2026, Sasha distributes the com-medals among the mutineers, as the connection they form will allow her to power up the Wave Motion core even further. However, it is all actually a ploy by Mother Dezarium to seize control of the Yamato and convert its Wave Motion energy into phase energy, with Sasha acting as her agent. In 2207, Grand Reverse begins to activate its hyperon bomb function, shocking both the humans and Dezarium. Sasha, who is channeling Mother Dezarium's control, decides to cut the connection after she realizes Kodai is her true family. The crew comes to their senses. Realizing they do not want to erase their loved ones they remove their com-medals and end the mutiny. On Earth, Alphon tries to explain the functionality of Grand Reverse, but Isidor reveals he has defected as well and points out their memories are not reliable due to Mother Dezarium's manipulation. Sasha resists Mother Dezarium's attempts to rewrite her memories, and is instructed by Starsha to head to Earth to rescue someone. Alphon ruminates to Yuki that their need to synchronize humanity's will to the true wave motion core contradicts the Grand Reverse's hyperon bomb function, meaning Mother Dezarium is hiding something from them.
22	"Begin the Counterattack! Revive, Ginga!" (Japanese: 反撃開始！ よみがえれ銀河!!)	June 26, 2026
Yasuo leads a resistance team to recover the stolen wave motion cores but are captured. Shiino attempts to convince Makoto to persuade Yasuo to cooperate with the Dezarium, threatening to declassify evidence of Kato collaborating with Gatlantis in order to save Tsubasa, but Makoto calls her bluff. Elsewhere, the rest of the resistance continues with their part of the plan, staging diversionary attacks on the Grand Reverse while Saki leads an attack to retake the Ginga and Yuki waits for Yasuo to bring a wave motion core to power up the Arizona. Yasuo is freed by his father, who reveals he knew the Dezarium lied about their origins but had his own reasons for siding with them. Saki is wounded trying to get Kanzaki out of her treatment pod, and ends up synchronizing with her thoughts. Kanzaki manages to activate the Cosmo Reverse, which powers up the Ginga and it begins destroying the Golba battleships in orbit around Earth. Alphon is brought to Skulldart, and he surmises that Mother Dezarium never had any intention to save the future. In 2026, Sasha files through a tear in reality and finds a still alive Niimi, who doesn't appear to have any memories of Sasha.
Part 7: Rainbow Samsara
23	"Arizona Takes Off! Defeat the Grand Reverse!!" (Japanese: 次回 アリゾナ発進! グランドリバースを倒せ!!)	October 30, 2026
Yasuo's father admits he sided with Dezarium to steal their technology, as he was afraid humanity would not get a chance to recover from the various wars it fought already. Sasha is confused why Niimi has no memories of her, until Analyzer reveals this is the present Niimi who was captured two months prior. Mother Dezarium then arrives and admits that the older Sasha is in fact a clone with false memories. She attempts to reassert control over Sasha, but she resists and teleports herself, Niimi, and Analyzer to Earth's surface. Sanada comes to the conclusion that they never actually traveled through time, and the 2026 Earth is in fact an elaborate deception created by the Dezarium. At the real Earth, Kanzaki dies and the Cosmo Reverse overloads before the Ginga can finish off the last Golba, but Yasuo commands a drone fleet to destroy it. The Dezarium attempt to hold Yasuo's father hostage, but he urges his son to keep fighting as he triggers a suicide bomb. After the Golbas are destroyed, the Arizona receives its wave motion core and begins attacking the Grand Reverse. With their hand forced, Mother Dezarium has the Grand Reverse take off. At the fake Earth, Kodai arrives to extract Sasha, Niimi, and Analyzer, but Sasha decides to stay behind.
24	"All-Out Attack! Resistance Fleet, Assemble!!"	October 30, 2026
Ranbel receives orders to stop the Yamato, but even he begins to suspect something is wrong with Mother Dezarium. On Earth, the Grand Reverse begins to advance on the capital, but the partisan Earth fleet joins forces with the Arizona and manages to stop its movement, but fail to cause any significant damage. On the fake Earth, the Yamato continues to try and find Sasha until Ranbel warps into the system, ready to battle them. Alphon and Isidor sabotage the Grand Reverse from the inside by eject all of its legs, while Maxim guides Makoto and Tsubasa to escape. The partisan fleet works together to push the Grand Reverse into space, and Mother Dezarium admits that the other Dezarium have no free will, and were programmed to believe they are humans from 3199 in order to trick Earth into accepting them. She then takes direct control of Isidor and guns down Alphon. At the fake Earth, the Yamato fires a supercharged wave motion gun at Ranbel's ship, forcing him to retreat. However, the attack has the side effect of incinerating the surface of the fake Earth.
25	"Stand Up! Sasha - For the Sake of Love"	October 30, 2026
Sanada theorizes that the true Dezarium race has been long extinct due to their over reliance on phase energy, and all that remains is Mother Dezarium. The surface then completely burns away to reveal the planet's true nature as the Dezarium homeworld. On Earth, Skulldart reasserts control of the Grand Reverse and has it re-enter Earth atmosphere so it can detonate. The Dezarium civilians struggle to cope with the revelation their entire lives were fabricated. Sasha also tries to cope with the revelation she is not the real Sasha, and Analyzer assures her that what matters are the relationships she has already made with the Yamato crew. However, Mother Dezarium captures Sasha and issues an ultimatum to the Yamato: turn their wave motion core into a new phase core so she can open the "gates to Heaven", or she will detonate the Grand Reverse. Sasha resists Mother Dezarium's control, stating that even is she is an artificial life, that does not mean she cannot still live as a human, and she battles her over control of the Dezarium network. Both Shiino and Kitano sacrifice themselves to change the Grand Reverse's trajectory so it doesn't crash on the capital, and Skulldart is killed in the impact. Sasha then heads for Dezarium's phase core while Mother Dezarium and a revived Skulldart await her arrival.
26	"Love Until That Day"	October 30, 2026
Yuki finds a mortally wounded Alphon, who tells her to contact Yamato with his com-medal and inform them to destroy the Grand Reverse's control system on the Dezarium homeworld to halt its detonation. Ranbel decides to join forces with the Yamato to attack Dezarium's core, and he sacrifices himself to open a path. The Yamato then confronts the core itself, but are shocked to discover Sasha is still inside. Mother Dezarium attempts to break Kodai's will by pointing out he does not have the resolve to kill Sasha and that he should just surrender. However, Sasha insists that Kodai believe in her, so he fires the wave motion gun and destroys the core along with Sasha and Mother Dezarium. Finally remembering her original purpose to help humanity, Mother Dezarium launches an escape pod containing the real Sasha as a final act of kindness, which the Yamato recovers. Back on Earth, the Grand Reverse shuts down for good, and the Dezarium begin to dissolve due to the lack of phase energy to maintain their bodies. Tsubasa is forced to say goodbye to Frulul as she dies while humanity comes to accept the Dezarium were the enemy. Afterwards, Earth, Galman, and the Bolar Federation begin rebuilding while the Yamato returns to Earth.
