= List of Space Battleship Yamato episodes =

This article is a list of episodes from the television show Space Battleship Yamato in order by production number.

== Episodes ==
No.	Title	Original release date
1	"SOS Earth! Revive Space Battleship Yamato!" "The Battle at Pluto" (Japanese: SOS地球!!甦れ宇宙戦艦ヤマト)	October 6, 1974
The Earth Defense Force has its last battle with the Gamilas near Pluto. Meanwhile, a mysterious spaceship crashes on Mars.
2	"The Opening Gun! Space Battleship Yamato Starts!" "Carrier Attacks the Sleeping Yamato" (Japanese: 号砲一発!!宇宙戦艦ヤマト始動!!)	October 13, 1974
The wreckage of the Imperial Japanese Navy battleship Yamato holds a secret. Finally, there is hope.
3	"Yamato Launch! The Challenge of 296,000 Light Years!" "Ultra-Menace Missile" (Japanese: ヤマト発進!!29万6千光年への挑戦!!)	October 20, 1974
4	"World of Wonder! Yamato Leaps Past Light!" "Test Warp to Mars" (Japanese: 驚異の世界!!光を飛び越えたヤマト)	October 27, 1974
5	"Escape the Floating Continent! Crisis Calls the Wave-Motion Gun!" "Jupiter's Floating Continent" (Japanese: 浮遊大陸脱出!!危機を呼ぶ波動砲!!)	November 3, 1974
6	"Space Destroyer Yukikaze Sleeps in the Ice Field" "Paladin" (Japanese: 氷原に眠る宇宙駆逐艦ゆきかぜ!)	November 11, 1974
7	"Yamato Sinks! Fateful Battle to Destroy the Enemy Stronghold!" "The Reflex Gun, Part 1" (Japanese: ヤマト沈没!!運命の要塞攻略戦!!)	November 17, 1974
The Yamato arrives on Pluto and launches an attack on the base that has been bombarding Earth. But the base has a secret satellite reflective gun that hits the Yamato. It manages to crash-land in Pluto's ocean only to be sunk right away.
8	"Yamato Braves Death! Destroy the Reflex Gun!" "The Reflex Gun, Part 2" (Japanese: 決死のヤマト!!反射衛星砲撃破せよ!!)	November 24, 1974
Playing a game of hide-and-seek underwater, the Yamato distracts base command while a commando led by Kodai goes to the surface to destroy the reflective gun and meeting blob-like Plutonians along the way. The explosion floods the base and the Gamilas are forced to evacuate.
9	"Revolving Defense! Asteroid Belt!" "The Asteroid Ring" (Japanese: 回転防禦!!アステロイド・ベルト!!)	December 1, 1974
Gamilas who saved their fleet are told to either win or die against the Yamato. The latter is heavily damaged and goes into hiding in an asteroid belt: Sanada using the asteroids as camouflage while repairing, then as an impenetrable ring of defense. The enemy fleet is annihilated.
10	"Farewell, Solar System! From the Galaxy, With Love!" "We Will Return" (Japanese: さらば太陽圏!銀河より愛をこめて!!)	December 8, 1974
Now the Yamato has some breathing room, the crew uses the opportunity to emit last minute transmissions towards the Earth, which will not be possible once they leave the Solar System. Everybody is concerned by how desperate the situation on Earth has become, even if Kodai and Okita don't have anybody left to transmit to.
11	"Resolution! Break Through the Gamilons' Absolute Defense Line!" "Desslok Mines" (Japanese: 決断!!ガミラス絶対防衛線突入!!)	December 15, 1974
The Yamato encounters a Gamilas minefield and attempts to cross it, but at some point the mines move closer on their own, so the ship has to stop and Analyzer is sent out to find the control mine and disable it, which he manages even though drunk at the time.
12	"Certain Death! The Wishing Star of Orion, Hell-star!" "The Sea of Fire" (Japanese: 絶体絶命!!オリオンの願い星、地獄星)	December 22, 1974
Near Orion the Yamato falls into a three-folded Gamilas trap: a magnetic barrier immobilizes it while missiles are being fired. Then a matter and energy eating gas cloud is sent after them. Finally the only way out of the barrier is through an active star. The Yamato attempts the passage.
13	"Hurry, Yamato! Earth is Suffering!" "The Gamilon Pilot" (Japanese: 急げヤマト!!地球は病んでいる!!)	December 29, 1974
On a reconnaissance mission, Kodai captures a Gamilon pilot. The crew is shocked to see Gamilons are pretty much humans. Follows Kodai's flashback of year 2192 when Japan was meteor bombarded for the time, his parents died, and his brother was enlisted as a space cadet.
14	"The Galaxy's Ordeal! The Year 2200 Advances!" "Octopus Starstorm" (Japanese: 銀河の試練!!西暦2200年の発進!!)	January 5, 1975
The Yamato sits out a space storm for three weeks, waiting for a corridor through a star cluster, as according to Shima bypassing it would take at least forty days. Tensions are high among the crew, Kodai and Shima come to blows. Yuki asks Okita to let her make New Year's mochi to lighten the mood.
15	"Desperate Escape! The Galaxy's Different Dimension" "Galactic Whirlpool" (Japanese: 必死の逃亡!!異次元のヤマト)	January 12, 1975
Closing in on planet Balan, the Yamato gets lost in a weird time dimension where both Wave-Motion and sub engines start acting up. Unfortunately Domel and his fleet are doing manoeuvres in the close vicinity. Only Okita's shrewdness and Starsha's guidance can save the Yamato now.
16	"Planet Beemela, Underground Prison of Condemned Criminals" "Stop at Beeland" (Japanese: ビーメラ星、地下牢の死刑囚!!)	January 19, 1975
Yuki is still being harassed by Analyzer, who declares that he wants to marry her. Okita sends Yuki and Analyzer to the surface of the planet Beemela to find and bring back edible plants, but the two are captured by a group of rebels among the Beemelarians who suspect them of being Gamilan invaders.
17	"Charge! Balanodon Special Attack Group!" "Balanosaurus" (Japanese: 突撃!!バラノドン特攻隊)	January 26, 1975
18	"Floating Fortress Island! Two Men Brave Death!" "Magnetron Wave" (Japanese: 浮かぶ要塞島!!たった二人の決死隊!!)	February 2, 1975
19	"Homesickness of Space! My Mother's Tears are My Tears!" "Communication Satellite" (Japanese: 宇宙の望郷!!母の涙は我が涙)	February 9, 1975
Aihara is suffering from severe homesickness, which sends him over the edge when he contacts Earth and sees his father die before his very eyes. After his appeals to Shima to turn the ship around fail, Aihara decides to strike out for home himself, not suspecting that he's being lured into a Gamilas trap.
20	"The Day Planet Balan's Sun Fell!" "The Artificial Sun" (Japanese: バラン星に太陽が落下する日!!)	February 16, 1975
21	"Desperate Challenge from Lysis' Fleet!" "Challenge of the Rainbow Galaxy" (Japanese: ドメル艦隊!!決死の挑戦状)	February 23, 1975
22	"Decisive Battle! Fight for Honor at the Rainbow Star Group!" "Battle of the Rainbow Galaxy" (Japanese: 決戦!!七色星団の攻防戦!!)	March 2, 1975
23	"Finally Arrived! Crest of the Magellanic Cloud's Wave!" "Dragged to Gamilon" (Japanese: 遂に来た!!マゼラン星雲波高し!!)	March 9, 1975
24	"Death Struggle! God, Weep for the Gamilons!" "The Battle of Gamilon" (Japanese: 死闘!!神よガミラスのために泣け!)	March 16, 1975
25	"Iscandar! A Dying Planet of Love!" "Iscandar" (Japanese: イスカンダル!!滅びゆくか愛の星よ!)	March 23, 1975
26	"Earth! Yamato Returns!" "The Journey Home" (Japanese: 地球よ!!ヤマトは帰って来た!)	March 30, 1975
