= Koala's Diary =

Japanese manga series

- First tankōbon volume cover

コアラ絵日記 (Koala E Nikki)
- Manga
- Written by: Yuami
- Published by: Kadokawa Shoten
- Original run: June 11, 2021 – present
- Volumes: 5
- Original net animation
- Directed by: Takao Kato
- Studio: Studio Mother
- Released: October 2, 2025 – present
- Runtime: 1 minute
- Episodes: 26

Koala's Diary (コアラ絵日記, Koala E Nikki) is a Japanese manga series written and illustrated by Yuami. Originally serialized as a web manga on Twitter since June 2021, it was later acquired by Kadokawa Corporation, who then began publishing the series in print in March 2022. Five tankōbon volumes have been released as of December 2025. An original net animation (ONA) adaptation produced by Studio Mother began releasing on YouTube in October 2025.

== Plot ==
A Koala living in Japan writes diary entries about the good things life has to offer.

== Characters ==
Koala (コアラさん, Koara-san)
Voiced by: Aya Uchida
Crow-san (カラスさん, Karasu-san)
Voiced by: Aya Uchida
Emu-san (エミューさん)
Voiced by: Aya Uchida
Hedgehog-san (ハリネズミさん, Harinezumi-san)
Voiced by: Aya Uchida

== Media ==
=== Manga ===
| No. | Japanese release date | Japanese ISBN |
|---|---|---|
| 1 | March 17, 2022 | 978-4-04-680919-3 |
| 2 | December 22, 2022 | 978-4-04-682116-4 |
| 3 | December 26, 2023 | 978-4-04-683176-7 |
| 4 | February 14, 2025 | 978-4-04-684477-4 |
| 5 | December 22, 2025 | 9784-04-685251-9 |

=== Anime ===
An original net animation (ONA) adaptation was announced on June 11, 2025. The series is animated by Studio Mother and directed by Takao Kato, with Chiharu Hara designing the characters and Atsushi Umebori and Slavomir Stanislaw Kowalewski composing the music. It began releasing on YouTube on October 2, 2025. The anime's theme song "Niji to" (With a Rainbow) performed by Punipuni Denki featuring Kan Sano.
