= Star Blazers: Space Battleship Yamato 2202 =

2017 Anime television series by Nobuyoshi Habara

- Star Blazers 2202
- DVD cover of the first film

宇宙戦艦ヤマト2202 愛の戦士たち (Uchū Senkan Yamato 2202 Ai no Senshi-tachi)
- Genre: Adventure, military science fiction, space opera
- Created by: Leiji Matsumoto; Yoshinobu Nishizaki
- Anime film series

Theatrical Edition
- Directed by: Nobuyoshi Habara
- Produced by: Hirotaka Furukawa
- Written by: Harutoshi Fukui (Note: Series composition and screenplay); Hideki Oba (Note: Screenplay)
- Music by: Akira Miyagawa
- Studio: Xebec
- Released: February 25, 2017 – March 1, 2019
- Runtime: 50 minutes (film 1); 100 minutes (films 2–7)
- Films: 7
- Serial novel
- Written by: Yuka Minakawa
- Illustrated by: Michio Murakawa
- Published by: Kadokawa
- Imprint: Kadokawa Shoten
- Original run: October 13, 2017 – present
- Volumes: 4
- Anime television series

TV Edition
- Directed by: Nobuyoshi Habara
- Produced by: Hirotaka Furukawa
- Written by: Harutoshi Fukui; Hideki Oba
- Music by: Akira Miyagawa; Hiroshi Miyagawa
- Studio: Xebec
- Licensed by: Crunchyroll
- Original network: TXN (TV Tokyo, TV Osaka)
- Original run: October 6, 2018 – March 30, 2019
- Episodes: 26
- Anime film

The "Space Battleship Yamato" Era: The Choice in 2202
- Directed by: Atsushi Sato
- Written by: Yuka Minakawa; Harutoshi Fukui
- Music by: Akira Miyagawa; Hiroshi Miyagawa
- Studio: Xebec; Studio Mother
- Released: June 11, 2021
- Runtime: 120 minutes
- Related
- Star Blazers: Space Battleship Yamato 2199 (2012 film series); Star Blazers: Space Battleship Yamato 2205 (2021 film series); Star Blazers: Space Battleship Yamato 3199 (2024 film series)

Star Blazers 2202, known in Japan as Space Battleship Yamato 2202: Warriors of Love (宇宙戦艦ヤマト2202 愛の戦士たち, Uchū Senkan Yamato Ni-ni-zero-ni Ai no Senshi-tachi), is a Japanese military science fiction animated film series produced by Xebec, the remake of Space Battleship Yamato II and the sequel to Star Blazers: Space Battleship Yamato 2199, originally based on the Space Battleship Yamato television series created by Yoshinobu Nishizaki and Leiji Matsumoto. It is directed by Nobuyoshi Habara (Fafner in the Azure) and written by Harutoshi Fukui (Mobile Suit Gundam Unicorn) with official character designs by Nobuteru Yuki. The first film of the series was released simultaneously in Japanese theaters and streaming services starting February 25, 2017. Similar to the first film series, the second loosely adapts both the animated series Space Battleship Yamato II and the film Arrivederci Yamato.

== Story ==
In 2202, three years after the Gamillas invasion of the Solar system, the people in the Solar System are finally at peace. The Earth's biosphere has been restored with the Cosmo Reverse System brought by the Yamato at the end of Space Battleship Yamato 2199. With the end of the war, there is a peace treaty between Earth and Gamillas which will strengthen their military bond and secure true peace. In addition to the reconstruction of Earth, the joint forces form a new intergalactic defense fleet with a new ship, Andromeda, to be its new symbol of power. Earth is set on a path of military expansion despite Starsha Iscandar's wishes of peace, and developing new forms of wave motion gun despite the agreement between Starsha and the crew of the Yamato.

When a new threat called Gatlantis, also known as the White Comet Empire, starts to wreak havoc on a newly reformed galaxy, the goddess Teressa calls upon the Yamato once more in order to fight back against the new threat.

== Production ==
The film series was first teased by producer Shoji Nishizaki in the Yamato Crew Report Magazine, stating that production of the sequel is in development. But added that it wasn't yet greenlighted. The first teaser of the film series was revealed on March 31, 2016, with an illustration by Makoto Kobayashi. It was later confirmed that director Nobuyoshi Habara, best known for the Fafner in the Azure anime and Fukui Harutoshi, the author of the Novel series Mobile Suit Gundam Unicorn will both direct and write the film series. Later on, the first teaser video of the film series was released.

Bandai Visual then later confirmed that the film will be released in both theaters in Japan as well as in several video streaming services in a limited basis. In December 2016, the official website confirmed that Kenjiro Tsuda will replace Keiji Fujiwara as Isami Enomoto while Hiroshi Kamiya and Masaki Terasoma were added as part of the cast. It soon followed with Sayaka Kanda as the voice of Teresa alongside a new 30 second trailer. Bandai Visual later released a special trailer of the film with the song "From Yamato with Love" and followed with the 12-minute preview stream of the first chapter.

The second film was released on June 24, 2017 the third released on October 14, 2017, while the fourth film is released on January 27, 2018. The fifth film was released on May 25, 2018; the sixth film on November 2, 2018 and the seventh and final film was released on March 1, 2019.

As with the first series, Space Battleship Yamato 2199, Voyager Entertainment and Funimation both licensed the series in North American territories, which commenced weekly streaming with an English-dubbed version (via Funimation) and an English Subtitled version (via Crunchyroll) on May 9, 2018.

== Media ==
=== Anime films ===
Space Battleship Yamato 2202: Warriors of Love was released in Japanese theaters and on video streaming services starting February 25, 2017, with Blu-Ray Releases following after the film's limited release. The theme song for the films is titled "Space Battleship Yamato 2202"' (宇宙戦艦ヤマト2202, Uchū Senkan Yamato Ni-ni-zero-ni) by the Osaka Shion Wind Orchestra and later, by Isao Sasaki while the ending songs are derived from the original Space Battleship Yamato II anime and film.

=== Anime television series ===
The TV version of the film series was broadcast on TV between October 6, 2018 and March 30, 2019. It was Xebec's final anime series.

==== Episode list ====
No.	Title	Original release date
1	"A.D 2202 – Revive, Space Battleship Yamato" "Seireki 2202-nen Yomigaere Uchū Senkan Yamato" (西暦2202年・甦れ宇宙戦艦ヤマト)	February 25, 2017 (Theatrical) (Note: Episodes 1 and 2 premiered in Japanese cinemas on February 25, 2017 with the subtitle "Starting Chapter")
A planet called Telezart comes under attack by a race known as the Gatlantis, who wish to conquer the world and use its power for their own gain. Meanwhile, Earth and Garmillas, now allies after their ten year war, fight side by side to retake a world lost. The Yamato crew are angered by the revelation of the Andromeda class battleship. The crew receive a vision from a planet called Telezart, calling for their aid.
2	"Tension – Reach the Embassy on the Moon" "Kinpaku getsumen taishikan ni senkō seyo" (緊迫・月面大使館に潜行せよ)	February 25, 2017 (Theatrical)
Tensions run high amongst the Terran and Garmillan factions. Four new Andromeda class battleships are revealed and launched, a blunt show of force. The Yamato crew reunite at heroes hill, to honour Captain Juzo Okita, the crew that have passed, and the day of their return. They discuss a vision they all saw, and their next move. Susumu Kodai is asked to go to the Moon by Garmillan liaison, Keyman.
3	"Shock – Legacy of the Cosmo Reverse" "Shōgeki Kosumo Ribāsu no Isan" (衝撃・コスモリバースの遺産)	June 24, 2017 (Theatrical) (Note: Episodes 3 to 6 premiered in Japanese cinemas on June 24, 2017 with the subtitle "Departure Chapter")
After making it to the Moon, Governor Barrell of the Garmillas faction informs Kodai that there is something he needs to witness. He orders Keyman to escort him to the Time Fault, which is a sub-dimension where time is 10x faster than in the outside world. There, the Wave-Motion Gun Fleet is being constructed, much to Kodai's chagrin.
4	"Departure to the Unknown!" "Michi e no Hasshin!" (未知への発進！)	June 24, 2017 (Theatrical)
The Yamato crew is resolute in their resolve, and they have decided to follow their hearts and head to the world of Telezart, where the cosmo wave came from. This leads to the Yamato crew leading a mutiny against the United Nations Cosmo Force, and stealing the Yamato to head to Telezart. They use the underground docks of the Garmillan wartime city to launch the Yamato.
5	"Clash! Yamato vs. Andromeda" "Gekitotsu! Yamato tai Andoromeda" (激突！ヤマト対アンドロメダ)	June 24, 2017 (Theatrical)
The Yamato heads for deep space, but cannot warp until their engine is repaired. The former fighter squadron pilots on a training exercise with the Andromeda fleet go AWOL, and head to Yamato. The Andromeda then arrives to attempt to disable the Yamato, but her crews resolve is strong and she blows past it. UNCF command rescinds their order to stop Yamato, and then tells them to head to Telezart as a mission.
6	"Battle to the Death – The 11th Planet Rescue Operation" "Shitō Dai-jū ichi-ban Wakusei" (死闘・第十一番惑星)	June 24, 2017 (Theatrical)
Yamato finds a lifeboat, one launched from the 11th planet of the Solar System, Brumus. Shiori Nagakura, a space marine, recounts how Gatlantis launched a surprise attack against the colony world. Many civilians are killed in the opening moments of the battle. The survivors battle Gatlantis forces, and are slowly overwhelmed. Before they are executed, the Yamato warps in a successfully evacuates the civilians and remaining marines.
7	"The Beam of Light Flashes! The Radiance of the Wave Motion Gun" "Kōbōissen! Hadō-hō no Kagayaki" (光芒一閃！波動砲の輝き)	October 14, 2017 (Theatrical) (Note: Episodes 7 to 10 premiered in Japanese cinemas on October 14, 2017 with the subtitle "True Love Chapter")
A large fleet of Gatlantis warships have warped out over Brumus. They begin taking a large cone shape above the planet. The Yamato, trapped underground, devises a plan of escape. Analyzer, the Yamato's Autonomous Unit, along with Shiro Sanada discern that the cone shaped fleet is a large gun, aimed at Earth. With no other choice, the Yamato launches, and against the promise of Juzo Okita, fires the wave motion gun, disabling the fleet.
8	"Trap at Planet Stravaze!" "Wakusei Shutorabāze no Wana!" (惑星シュトラバーゼの罠！)	October 14, 2017 (Theatrical)
The Yamato leaves Brumus and heads to the planet Stravaze, where it plans to link with a Garmillan fleet that will take the civilians back to Earth. During the exchange of ships, they come under attack by rebel Garmillan forces, seeking to destroy the former ruler, Desslers, shadow from Garmillas.
9	"Zwordar, The Devil's Alternative" "Zwōdā, Akuma no Sentaku" (ズォーダー、悪魔の選択)	October 14, 2017 (Theatrical)
In a Akerius ruin on Stravaze, Gatlantis Emperor Zwordar explains how he will force Kodai to choose the mass lives of the civilians, or Mori Yuki, his love. The artificial body detonates, but Hajime Saito, one of the Cosmo Marines, saves Kodai from the explosion. Kodai is torn between which ship to save, and which to sacrifice. Yuki offers herself as sacrifice. The Yamato uses the Wave Motion Gun and collapses the rift, saving all lives.
10	"Spellbound: The Space Fireflies Beckon a Crisis" "Genwaku Kiki o yobu Uchū Hotaru" (幻惑・危機を呼ぶ宇宙ホタル)	October 14, 2017 (Theatrical)
After escaping the near tragedy of Stravaze, the Yamato resumes course to Telezart. En-route, what seemingly appear to be fireflies begin to float around and into the Yamato. The crew, in a trance-like state, capture these fireflies and keep them in containers around the ship. This sends the crew into a hyper-emotional state, which makes them act more irrationally. With the help of Keyman, they are able to neutralize the infestation.
11	"Dessler's Challenge!" "Desurā no chōsen!" (デスラーの挑戦！)	January 27, 2018 (Theatrical) (Note: Episodes 11 to 14 premiered in Japanese cinemas on January 27, 2018 with the subtitle "Karma Chapter")
The Gatlantis fleet at Brumus gives chase to the Yamato, bent on revenge. They are swiftly destroyed by Abelt Dessler, who wishes to 'prove' himself to the Gatlantis Emperor. He then hunts down the Yamato, using long-range missiles to send them on a particular planned path. The Yamato warps into a sub-dimension, one born of a dying star. Dessler uses his Wave Motion gun to try and destroy Yamato; however, they ride the energy like a wave and use it to escape.
12	"The Shocking White Comet Empire: The Yamato Rams Through!" "Kyōi no Kakushoku Suisei Teikoku Yamato Kyōkō toppa!" (驚異の白色彗星帝国・ヤマト強行突破！)	January 27, 2018 (Theatrical)
The Yamato is ambushed by the White Comet, Gatlantis's homeworld. The ship is pulled into the Comet, seemingly by unnatural forces. The silver priestess of Gatlantis, Sabera, resonates with a sleeper-agent of a similar design, which causes her mind to crash. Zworder murders Sabera, and allows Yamato to escape.
13	"The Terezart Landing Operation: Strike the Enemy Missile Fleet!" "Terezāto Jōriku Sakusen Teki Misairu Kantai o Tatake!" (テレザート上陸作戦・敵ミサイル艦隊を叩け！)	January 27, 2018 (Theatrical)
Arriving at Telezart, the Kodai and the crew devise a plan to punch through the Gatlantis fleet blockading the world. Using a warp booster plane and mechanized units, they jump behind enemy lines and destroy the rear-guard. The main Gatlantis force uses a specialized missile to destabilize Yamato. With the mechanized units holding the Yamato, Kodai shows his resolve and fires the Wave Motion Gun, destroying the Gatlantis fleet.
14	"The Zabaibal Onslaught: Finding Teresa" "Zabaibaru Mōkō Teresa o Kakken seyo" (ザバイバル猛攻・テレサを発見せよ)	January 27, 2018 (Theatrical)
The Gatlantis have a ground assault force, which begins to attack Yamato, who pulls back to a safe range. Some mechanized units head to ground to establish a landing zone. The onslaught is heavy, until Saito drops a few large asteroids on the enemy tank brigade, forcing them into close combat. With the enemy forces destroyed, Telezart fully reveals itself.
15	"Teresa, Cry for Dessler!" "Teresa yo, desurā no tame ni nake!" (テレサよ、デスラーのために泣け！)	May 15, 2018 (Theatrical) (Note: Episodes 15 to 18 premiered in Japanese cinemas on May 15, 2018 with the subtitle "Purgatory Chapter")
Teresa reads through Desslers mind, dredging up old memories from a time long passed. Kodai sneaks up behind him, intent on ending him for good. Keyman arrives minutes later, wanting to find out the truth. It is revealed that he himself is a Dessler, and nephew to Albelt Dessler. Keyman turns his gun on Kodai and knocks him unconscious.
16	"So long, Teresa! The Bouquet of Two Desslers" "Saraba teresa yo! Futari no desurā ni hanataba o" (さらばテレサよ！二人のデスラーに花束を)	May 15, 2018 (Theatrical)
Keyman finds himself questioning his choices, and goes back to Teresa to seek guidance. Albelt also finds that he himself requires answers, and also seeks Teresa's counsel, even if he does not necessarily want it. Keyman, now having a new purpose, frees the captives aboard Dessler's ship and flees back to the Yamato.
17	"Saturn's Offshore Battle: Gather the Wave Motion Fleet!" "Dosei oki Kaisen Hadō-hō Kantai Shūketsu seyo!" (土星沖海戦・波動砲艦隊集結せよ！)	May 15, 2018 (Theatrical)
Gatlantis have begun their second phase of invading the Solar System, by sending an advanced force to Saturn. The UNCF fleet moves to defend Saturn, but are slowly overwhelmed. On Earth, the President of Terra declares open war with Gatlantis. Admiral Yamanami, in charge of Andromeda, takes his fleets and counter-attacks against Gatlantis.
18	"Yamato's Despair: Once More, the Devil's Alternative" "Yamato zettaizetsumei akuma no sentaku futatabi" (ヤマト絶体絶命・悪魔の選択再び)	May 15, 2018 (Theatrical)
Just as Gatlantis prepares to slaughter the Terran fleet, Wave Motion Gun shots crash through Saturn's rings and destroy a portion of the Gatlantis fleet. Terran ships jump through the rocks and begin their assault, as more de-warp into the system. Before the fleets can fight for too long, the White Comet jumps into Saturn and destroys a chunk of it. The Wave Motion fleet scattered, the Yamato attempts to use the Wave Motion Gun to disable the White Comet, but are instead knocked out of commission and dragged into the white abyss.
19	"Yamato's Successor, Its Name Is Ginga" "Yamato o tsugu mono, sononaha ginga" (ヤマトを継ぐもの、その名は銀河)	November 2, 2018 (Theatrical) (Note: Episodes 19 to 22 premiered in Japanese cinemas on November 2, 2018 with the subtitle "Resurrection Chapter")
The Space Battleship Ginga, a Yamato class battleship, begins counter-attack operations against Gatlantis. Gatlantis attempt to thwart Ginga and her fleet, but are ultimately wiped out. Meanwhile, Yamato has crashed on a world within the White Comet, and the crew are exploring the ancient ruins on the planet.
20	"Gatlantis, the Cursed Child" "Gatorantisu, norowa reshi ko-ra" (ガトランティス、呪われし子ら)	November 2, 2018 (Theatrical)
Kodai and Keyman have departed Yamato in search for answers. They stumble across ancient ruins, in which an old AI is guarding vital information about Gatlantis. The AI takes over Analyzers body, and wishes to speak to the last human of this world. They take the AI to Toko Katsuragi, the Gatlantis spy, who is pure blood. Elsewhere, Zwordar orders the White Comet to warp to Mars Defence Line.
21	"Escape the Nightmare!!" "Akumu kara no dasshutsu!!" (悪夢からの脱出！！)	November 2, 2018 (Theatrical)
Katsuragi tells the AI to reveal everything about the planet, and Gatlantis. It is revealed to Kodai and the crew that Gatlantis are artificial, and that they have a major kill switch right under their leaders feet. Zwordar orders the planet Yamato is on to be destroyed. At the Mars Defence Line, Admiral Yamanami with an upgraded Andromeda, fights through hordes of enemy ships in an attempt to reach the centre of the White Comet. He sees that Yamato is alive, and using his ship as a sacrifice, rescues Yamato.
22	"The Destined Confrontation!" "Shukumei no taiketsu!" (宿命の対決)	November 2, 2018 (Theatrical)
The Yamato receives repairs and upgrades at the shipyard above Mars, where much of Ginga's parts are transferred over. Repaired, the Yamato sets out to chase after the White Comet and end the war once and for all. However, before the Yamato can get far, she is attacked by Dessler, who struck a deal with Gatlantis. Kodai orders the Yamato to warp into Desslers ships bow, where they can board and disable the ship.
23	"Warriors of Love" "Ai no senshi-tachi" (愛の戦士たち)	March 1, 2019 (Theatrical) (Note: Episodes 23 to 26 premiered in Japanese cinemas on March 1, 2019 with the subtitle "Nova Chapter")
Keyman and Dessler face off on the bridge. The Gatlantis envoy attempts to force Keyman to kill Dessler, so he can see their emotions. Kodai arrives on the scene and attempts to stop the conflict, and is nearly shot dead for it. Yuki, who had been tailing Kodai, leaps out from behind cover and takes his bullet. The grief overwhelming, the Gatlantis envoy plans to stand down until a guard executes him. Dessler bids Yamato a farewell, and leaves the area for good. Meanwhile, Gatlantis has jumped ahead and has begun to invade Earth.
24	"Yamato, Attack the Comet Empire!" "Yamato, Suisei Teikoku o kōryaku seyo!" (ヤマト、彗星帝国を攻略せよ！)	March 1, 2019 (Theatrical)
The Yamato warps to Earth, just ahead of the White Comet. Using Dessler's ship as a shield, they fire the Transit Wave Motion Gun, which destroys the protective layers surrounding the Gatlantis homeworld. Garmillas warps in to defend the planet while the Yamato sneaks on ahead. Yamato charges through the White Comet, becoming heavily damaged. The fighter squadron make it a bit further, and head to the throne room, where they come face to face with Zwordar.
25	"Farewell, Space Battleship Yamato" "Saraba Uchū Senkan Yamato" (さらば宇宙戦艦ヤマト)	March 1, 2019 (Theatrical)
Zwordar activates Golem, which wipes out the Gatlantis race, all but himself. He is absorbed into the Ark of Destruction, which begins to transform. The Yamato manages to escape the area, but the gravity anchor is holding them. Keyman, using a Wave Motion torpedo, sacrifices himself to free Yamato. Too damaged to continue, the Yamato is evacuated. Using the now bleeding core of the Yamato, Kodai, as well as Yuki, use the Yamato to destroy what remains of the Ark of Destruction, ending the war.
26	"Earth, Yamato Is ..." "Chikyū yo, Yamato wa..." (地球よ、ヤマトは...)	March 1, 2019 (Theatrical)
Six months have passed since the Gatlantis war. The surviving Yamato crew are at Heroes Hill, mourning their lost comrades. In the Time Fault Factory, the Yamato warps out from a higher dimension. Kodai and Yuki are alive, but trapped in this higher dimension. Yamanami, Sanada, and a few others attempt to convince the Earth Council to let them use the Time Fault as a booster, to save Kodai and Yuki. It's put to a vote, and the Yamato Crew win unanimously. Yamato is boosted to the higher dimension, and Kodai and Yuki are rescued. The Yamato returns to real-space and returns to Earth.

=== Recap film ===
The "Space Battleship Yamato" Era: The Choice in 2202 (『宇宙戦艦ヤマト』という時代 西暦2202年の選択, "Uchū Senkan Yamato" to Iu Jidai: Seireki 2202-nen no Sentaku), a recap film that compiles the Yamato 2199 and Yamato 2202 anime series with new scenes by Studio Mother, was planned to be released on January 15, 2021, but was postponed to June 11, 2021, due to COVID-19 epidemic.

=== Novel ===
An ongoing novel adaptation by Yuka Minakawa was published by Kadokawa under the Kadokawa Shoten imprint on October 13, 2017. 4 volumes were published so far.
