= Star Blazers: Space Battleship Yamato 2199 =

Television anime

- Star Blazers 2199
- Official poster for the series showing some of the main characters and the titular spaceship

宇宙戦艦ヤマト2199 (Uchū Senkan Yamato 2199)
- Genre: Adventure, military science fiction, space opera
- Created by: Leiji Matsumoto; Yoshinobu Nishizaki
- Anime film series

Theatrical Edition
- Directed by: Akihiro Enomoto (films 1–3); Yutaka Izubuchi (films 4–7)
- Produced by: Atsushi Ariyoshii; Hideaki Matsumoto; Fumi Teranishi; Mikio Gunji; Tetsuya Matsubara (films 1–3)
- Written by: Yutaka Izubuchi
- Music by: Akira Miyagawa
- Studio: AIC (films 1–3); Xebec (films 4–7)
- Licensed by: NA: Voyager Entertainment (Licensing Rights) Crunchyroll (Home Video)
- Released: April 7, 2012 – August 24, 2013
- Runtime: 50 minutes (film 1); 100 minutes (films 2–7)
- Films: 7
- Anime television series

TV Edition
- Directed by: Yutaka Izubuchi; Akihiro Enomoto
- Produced by: Atsushi Ariyoshii; Hideaki Matsumoto; Fumi Teranishi; Mikio Gunji
- Written by: Yutaka Izubuchi
- Music by: Akira Miyagawa
- Studio: AIC (ep. 1–10); Xebec (ep. 11–26)
- Licensed by: NA: Voyager Entertainment (Licensing Rights) Crunchyroll (Streaming & Home Video)
- Original network: JNN (MBS)
- Original run: April 6, 2012 (premiere on Family Gekijo); April 7, 2013 – September 29, 2013
- Episodes: 26
- Anime film

A Voyage to Remember
- Directed by: Takao Kato
- Written by: Takao Kato; Shigeru Morita
- Music by: Akira Miyagawa; Hiroshi Miyagawa
- Studio: AIC; Xebec
- Released: October 11, 2014
- Runtime: 120 minutes
- Related
- Odyssey of the Celestial Ark (2014 film, sequel); Star Blazers 2202 (2017 film series, sequel); Star Blazers 2205 (2021 film series, sequel); Star Blazers 3199 (2024 film series, sequel)

Star Blazers 2199, known in Japan as Space Battleship Yamato 2199 (宇宙戦艦ヤマト2199, Uchū Senkan Yamato Ni-ichi-kyū-kyū), is a 2012–2013 Japanese military science fiction anime television series that is a remake of the first Space Battleship Yamato television series created by Yoshinobu Nishizaki and Leiji Matsumoto in 1974, known in the United States as Star Blazers. The series is a space opera, and was originally screened back-to-back in theaters across Japan, a few episodes at a time prior to release on home video, and aired on television from April 7, 2013, to September 29, 2013. Voyager Entertainment currently licensed the series outside Japan, with Funimation streaming their English dub of the series starting on November 8, 2017.

Two movies based on the series were released in 2014: A Voyage to Remember and Odyssey of the Celestial Ark. A sequel series, Star Blazers: Space Battleship Yamato 2202, was released in theaters from 2017 to 2019.

== Plot ==
In 2191, Earth made first contact with aliens called Gamilas. The first attempt at peaceful contact with the Gamilas failed, resulting in interstellar war. The United Nations Cosmo Navy, even though outmatched by the Gamilas' space naval forces, was able to stop their direct assaults on Earth in the Second Battle for Mars, though it suffered heavy losses in the process. The Gamilas, from their military base on Pluto, then began a planetary bombardment with modified asteroids called planet bombs. These bombs hampered the United Nations' efforts to rebuild their space fleet and forced Earth to construct underground cities to protect humanity. The planet bombs altered the atmosphere and irradiated the planetary surface, causing the complete destruction of the planet's biosphere. The Gamilas then started what is believed to be their first step in terraforming—preparing the Earth to be inhabited by themselves—by introducing plant life that was lethal to any life on Earth. With mankind facing extinction, the United Nations started planning for a small colony of humans to leave Earth in an attempt at the survival of humanity, called the Izumo Plan. But in early 2198, Starsha, from the planet Iscandar, learned of Earth's situation and dispatched her sister Yurisha to Earth. Yurisha brought with her the designs to what is called the Dimensional Wave Motion Engine, providing for interstellar flight along with other technological assistance to Earth. The Iscandarans revealed that they could reverse the damage done to the Earth with the Cosmo Reverse System. For technical reasons they could not send the system directly and would need Earth to send a ship for it. The United Nations then scrapped the Izumo Plan in order to build a new Cosmo Navy ship to retrieve the Cosmo Reverse System. The new ship was designed as a heavily armed space battleship. To conceal the ship's construction from the Gamilas, Earth built the new ship at the same site as the sunken World War II Yamato battleship. The new space battleship was also named the Yamato, for which the series Space Battleship Yamato 2199 is named.

Over the course of the series, the Yamato and its crew were continually attacked by Gamilan forces on Jupiter, the moons of Saturn, and Pluto. As the Yamato battled its way out of the Solar System and the Milky Way Galaxy, Gamilas leader Abert Dessler took a personal interest in the unusually advanced and seemingly unstoppable Earth vessel. Suspicious of Iscandar's involvement in the humans' quest, Dessler schemed to stop the Yamato at all costs before it could fulfill its mission—even as political intrigue plagued his empire. To this end, he ordered his top military commanders and most sophisticated spacecraft into the fight, putting the determination of the Yamato crew to even more rigorous tests as they coped with questions about their mission and strange incidents aboard their own ship.

== Cast ==
Yamato crew

Characters	Japanese	English
Susumu Kodai	Daisuke Ono	Christopher Wehkamp, Jeannie Tirado (young)
Daisuke Shima	Kenichi Suzumura	Ricco Fajardo
Juzo Okita	Takayuki Sugo	Brian Mathis
Yuki Mori	Houko Kuwashima	Mallorie Rodak
Shiro Sanada	Hōchū Ōtsuka	
Hikozaemon Tokugawa	Mugihito	
Yasuo Nanbu	Kenji Akabane	
Yoshikazu Aihara	Masato Kokubun	
Yuria Misaki	Aya Uchida	
Dr. Sakezo Sado	Shigeru Chiba	Kenny Green
Makoto Harada	Rina Satou	
Analyzer Unit 09	Chō	
Kaoru Niimi	Aya Hisakawa	
Saburo Kato	Yoshimasa Hosoya	
Akira Yamamoto	Rie Tanaka	Jeannie Tirado
Hiroki Shinohara	Daisuke Hirakawa	
Susumu Yamazaki	Hiroshi Tsuchida	
Hajime Hirata	Fumihide Ise	
Isami Enomoto	Keiji Fujiwara	
Toru Hoshina	Motoki Takagi	Justin Briner
Shinya Ito	Toshihiko Seki	Justin Cook
Sukeharu Yabu	Chō	Ben Phillips
Koji Saeki	Masaaki Itatori	Orion Pitts
Miki Saijou	Satomi Moriya	

Garmilas

Characters	Japanese	English
Abelt Desler	Kōichi Yamadera	Chris Rager
Elk Domel	Akio Ohtsuka	J. Michael Tatum
Rydof Hyss	Yousuke Akimoto	Ray Gestaut
Garemund Goer	Masashi Hirose	Barry Yandell
Ghader Talan	Kōtarō Nakamura	Brad Jackson
Wielte Talan	Yutaka Aoyama	Chuck Huber
Mirenel Linke	Akemi Okamura	Lindsay Seidel, Ariel Graham (young)
Miezela Cerestella	Minori Chihara	Jennifer Green
Heydom Gimleh	Junpei Morita	John Gremillion
Herm Zoellick	Norio Wakamoto	Jim Johnson
Gul Ditz	Katsunosuke Hori	Ben Bryant
Melda Ditz	Shizuka Itou	Katelyn Barr
Wolf Flakken	Jouji Nakata	David Wald
Valke Shultz	Yū Shimaka	Mark Stoddard
Gelf Gantz	Chō	Tyson Rinehart
Wol Jarletora	Daisuke Egawa	Hunter Scott
Elisa Domel	Chiaki Takahashi	Kate Oxley
Norran Ortschett	Tetsuya Kakihara	Justin Pate
Vars Lang	Tohru Ohkawa	Jeremy Schwartz
Paren Nerge	Takashi Onozuka	Chris Patton
Saleluya Larleta	Hiro Yuuki	Wendy Powell

Iscandar

Characters	Japanese	English
Starsha Iscandar	Kikuko Inoue	Monica Rial
Yurisha Iscandar	Houko Kuwashima	Mallorie Rodak

U.N. Cosmo Force

Characters	Japanese	English
Heikurō Tōdō	Shinji Ogawa	Bradley Campbell
Kotetsu Serizawa	Tesshō Genda	Doug Jackson
Ryū Hijikata	Unshō Ishizuka	Bill Jenkins
Mamoru Kodai	Mitsuru Miyamoto	Z. Charles Bolton

== Production ==
The new series is a remake of the original Space Battleship Yamato television series from 1974, with some changes in the main story, new characters (including several female ones), a more modern tech design, and an animation style inspired by that of the original series. The original intro music theme from the first series composed by Hiroshi Miyagawa with vocals by Isao Sasaki has also been re-scored for this new production by Hiroshi's son Akira. The producers of the series worked with the public relations office for the Maritime Staff Office, part of the MSDF, which was listed as a "technical consultant" in closing credits, while pronunciation and speech used by characters was "based on MSDF vernacular."

Yutaka Izubuchi serves as supervising director, with character designs by Nobuteru Yuki, and Junichiro Tamamori and Makoto Kobayashi in charge of mecha and conceptual designs. The series is animated by Xebec (episodes 1 to 26) and AIC (episodes 1 to 10). Famous anime director and creator Hideaki Anno designed the new series' opening sequence, which is a homage to the one that appeared in the first television series.

The full anime series started airing on April 7, 2013, in the MBS/TBS' 5:00 p.m timeslot, replacing Magi: The Labyrinth of Magic.

The Yamato wreck in the 1974 series where the Space Battleship Yamato was built under was based on the general assumption in the 1970s that the warship sank intact. When the actual wreck was found in 1985, it was in a much more mangled shape than previously thought. In an April 2013 interview with Japanese online hobby shop Ami Ami, Bandai model developer Hirofumi Kishiyama said the emergence of the space battleship itself in 2199 was a plot device that needed to be resolved. Taking into account the 1985 discovery, he said the new Yamato "wreck" is simply camouflage for the warship being built underneath. Where the 1974 space battleship Yamato was conceptualized to be the same length as the original battleship at 263 meters, the spaceship in the new series was enlarged to 333m to address design discrepancies found in the first show.

Characters who appeared in the original series' second and third seasons are included in 2199 as well.

The first episode of the show has been dubbed into English by Bang Zoom! Entertainment, and was shown at both Anime Expo and San Diego Comic-Con in 2013.

In 2014, a feature-length compilation of the Space Battleship Yamato 2199 series titled Space Battleship Yamato 2199: A Voyage to Remember and an original movie based on the series, Space Battleship Yamato 2199: Odyssey of the Celestial Ark, were released.

On November 3, 2017, FUNimation announced that they had acquired streaming rights to the series and would stream the English dub on November 8.

== Marketing ==
=== Release ===
Episode 1 of the series was previewed on April 6, 2012, on Family Gekijo channel, although the remaining 25-minute episodes did not run on television until 2013.

Episodes 1 and 2 of the new series were released as a fifty-minute anime film called Dai-Isshō Harukanaru Tabidachi (Chapter 1: "The Long Journey") premiering in Japanese cinemas on April 7, 2012 (the sixty-seventh anniversary of the loss of the Yamato during the Battle of Okinawa). It was also released on May 25, 2012, as Blu-ray and DVD format volumes in Japan. Six more anime films, containing four episodes each, for a total of twenty-six, were released every few months in select theaters across Japan through 2013. The series commenced weekly broadcast on April 7, 2013.

The second film, Dai-nishō: Taiyōken no Shitō (Chapter 2: "Desperate Struggle in the Heliosphere"), featured episodes 3-6. It opened in ten theaters in Japan on June 30, 2012. The Blu-ray Disc and DVD volumes were released on July 27, 2012.

The third film, Dai-sanshō: Hateshinaki Kōkai (Chapter 3: "The Endless Voyage"), featuring Episodes 7-10, opened in twelve Japanese theaters from October 13 through October 26, 2012 (expanding from ten theaters for the previous films). The Blu-ray and DVD volumes were released on November 22, 2012.

The fourth film, Dai-yonshō: Ginga Henkyō no Kōbō (Chapter 4: "Defense of the Galactic March"), featured Episodes 11-14, and opened in twelve Japanese theaters from January 12 through January 26, 2013. The Blu-ray and DVD volumes were released on February 22, 2013.

The fifth film, Dai-goshō: Bōkyō no Gingakan Kukan (Chapter 5: "The Redolence of Intergalactic Space") featuring Episodes 15-18, was released in twelve Japanese theaters on April 13, 2013. The Blu-ray and DVD volumes were released on May 28, 2013.

The sixth film, Dai-rokushō: Tōtatsu! Dai Magellan (Chapter 6: "Arrival! Large Magellanic Cloud") featuring episodes 19-22 was released in sixteen Japanese theaters on June 15, 2013. The Blu-ray and DVD volumes were released on July 26, 2013.

The seventh and final film, Dai-nanashō: Soshite Kan wa Iku (Chapter 7: "And Now the Warship Comes") featuring episodes 23-26 was released in Japanese theaters on August 24, 2013. Unlike the previous episodes (other than the first one), they first aired on TV before the Blu-ray and DVD volumes were released on October 25, 2013.

=== Compilation film ===
Space Battleship Yamato 2199: A Voyage to Remember (宇宙戦艦ヤマト2199 追憶の航海, Uchū Senkan Yamato 2199: Tsuioku No Koukai), also known as Space Battleship Yamato 2199: Voyage of Remembrance, is a 2014 Japanese anime recap film that compiles the twenty-six episodes of the Space Battleship Yamato 2199 anime series, analogous to the 1977 film compilation of the original series. Writers have unofficially used the English translations Space Battleship Yamato 2199: Voyage of Remembrance and Space Battleship Yamato 2199: A Voyage to Remember. However, the distributor has yet to choose an official English language title.

=== Toys/models ===
Bandai started releasing kits based on the vehicles seen in the series in 2012.

As of January 2015, the company produced 1/1000 scale models of the Yamato, two sets of UNCN warships, four sets of Garmilas warships, the Gamilas Polmeria-class Assault Carrier, the Gelvades-class Assault Carrier "Darold", and the Guipellon-class multi-deck carriers Lambea, Balgray, and the Schderg. Some of these kits also contain bonus kits, including reissues of certain warship kits from the original series' Mecha Collection line. The line Garmillas warships are also available as online-exclusive Imperial Guard sets, sporting green blue colors. Test shots of a 1/1000 version of the Zelguud-class dreadnought Domelus III and the Deusula II dreadnought were made public in 2013. Bandai originally held back on a full release for the Domelus III, stating that the model's size – around two feet long – was too big for the average Japanese home. The 1/500 release of the Yamato, measuring at over two feet, two inches – eventually prompted the release. The Gatlantis Empire's ships also appeared in the main kit line and the Mecha Collection line in 2014.

Vehicles from the series are available in 1/72 scale. The line started with the α-1 and α-2 Cosmo Zeroes in 2012. The March 2013 issue of Dengeki Hobby magazine had a free 1/72 Cosmo Falcon fighter packaged and Bandai followed suit with recast of the Cosmo Falcon (in Saburo Kato and Akira Yamamoto's paint schemes) later in 2013. Some of the 1/1000 kits also have their own space fighter models, with the Polmeria including a free DWG229 Melanka flying-wing bomber, two FG14 Zedora fighters with the Balgray, a DWG262 Czvarke fighter with Garmillas Warship set III and the FG156 Sumaruhi recon plane with Garmillas Warship Set IV.

Taking off from previous efforts to produce specific paint sets for Gundam HGUC models, Gunze Sangyo is also producing special paint sets for the 2199 warship kits.

In January 2014, Bandai also released a Yamato 2199 version of the Battleship Yamato (number GX-64) in their Soul of Chogokin line of adult collector's toys, which is a total redesign from their previous release (number GX-57.)

== Differences from the original series ==
The series is markedly different from the original in many ways. Those include:

- The Yamato of 2199 is bigger than previous incarnations of the ship, because the anime design team now scaled the entire ship to be on proportion with the dimensions of the bridge, hence the Yamato becoming 333m long (the original is 263m long). Also, the entire ship has been internally reworked to make more sense and it is no longer built in the wreck of the original sunken battleship Yamato.
- In the original series, Queen Starsha had only one sister, Sasha (Astra in the English dub), who was sent to Earth with both Starsha's message and the plans for the Wave Motion Engine. In 2199, the queen has two sisters, Yurisha and Sasha. Yurisha was sent to Earth one year before Sasha with the message and the engine schematics. She was left comatose in an auto accident that left Mori with severe memory loss. Sasha was tasked with bringing the engine's "activation core" to Earth but died in a crash on Mars. Yurisha bears an uncanny resemblance to Yuki Mori, leading to a protracted case of mistaken identity between them (with Yuki even being taken prisoner by Garmilas operatives who mistook her for Yurisha).
- The Yamato departs Earth with a much larger crew of 999 crew on board. In the original series, Yamato had a crew of 114. This is quite possibly a nod to Galaxy Express 999, another series created by Leiji Matsumoto.
- While main weapons remain largely the same, the Yamato now has missile ports in the under keel to cover that previously assumed "blind" spot.
- Captain Okita is much more involved in the storyline. In the original Yamato series, his illness took him out much sooner and he spent more time laid up in bed. In the remake, he remains in command almost to the end.
- In the original series, Susumu Kodai assumed command of the Yamato when Okita was taken ill. In 2199, Shiro Sanada is the designated XO and takes over when Okita cannot command. Sanada is considerably fleshed out from the original series, with much more back story and complexity to his character.
- The Analyzer robot repeatedly sexually harassed Yuki in the original series, but it is much better behaved in the remake.
- In the original version, Sanada's limbs were cybernetic. There is no indication of that in 2199.
- The Yamato's main guns can fire projectile shells in addition to anti-electron pulses. In the first series, she never fired shells (which turn out to be critical to the ship's survival in more than one instance).
- Yuki is no longer needed in the medical bay, as Dr. Sado has three nurse-medics (and even a full operating theater among other medical facilities) at his disposal, with Warrant Officer Yuria Misaki (one of Yuki's relief persons at the bridge) acting as a fourth medic in emergencies with large numbers of injuries. There are many more women compared to the original series since now one third of the crew is female, including a pilot (Akira Yamamoto) and an intelligence officer (Kaoru Niimi).
- The character Akira Yamamoto is made into a woman, and has a much larger role in this part of the story.
- There is considerable cordial if tense interaction between Garmilans and humans, something that did not happen in the original series.
- We see much more of Garmilas society. Many of its leaders are shown sympathetically to be family men who are more worried about their children than war. People conquered by Garmilas serve as second-class citizens, and are often looked down upon by Garmilans.
- Abelt Desler's motivations are much more totalitarian here. In the original series, Earth was bombarded and its atmosphere changed due to his plans to move his people there from his dying homeworld. In 2199, despite him showing a tinge of his motives seen in the original, Earth's bombardment is simply a part of his policy: advanced intelligent species either join the Empire as second-class citizens or they will be destroyed. However, the sequel Star Blazers: Space Battleship Yamato 2202 shows that Garmilas homeworld is actually on verge of destruction like in the original series.
- The Garmilas military and Desler are much more obvious Nazi figures than before. On some of their uniforms, the higher ranks wear a logo on their neck that looks like the SS lightning bolts, and the names of all of the admirals and generals are distinctly German-sounding, like Ditz, Goer, Hiss, Domel and Shultz; most of whom are allegories of the top military officers of Nazi Germany. (Despite this, in one sense the Garmilans do still reflect Americans. The military platoon made up of Zaltzi volunteers, second class citizens of Garmilas, is still called the 442nd Special Operations platoon, a reference to the US Army's heavily decorated 442nd Infantry Regiment during World War II, made up of Japanese volunteers.) The official designations for many Garmilas assets, such as the Stuka Dive Bomber (which features the inverted gull wings of the Stuka) and DWG 262 fighter (which visually is similar to the Me 262), even the names of most of its vessels, bear similarities to their WW2 counterparts.
- The suicide run of Mamoru Kodai's command, the Yukikaze, occurs for a different motive – to cover the retreat of Okita rather than being unable to bear the shame of defeat as in the original. This was the motive given in the Star Blazers dub, and also used in the 2010 live action film.
- The Garmilas fleet has a new ship, the dimensional submarine UX-01, commanded by Captain Wolf Flakken, whom even his peers acknowledge is independent and difficult to control. The sub can hide in another dimension and fire torpedoes into regular space. This establishes the character and submarine in the series well before being seen in the third season 'Bolar Wars' of the original series.
- After surviving the Battle of Pluto and being taken prisoner, the Garmilan ship carrying Mamoru Kodai as a bio-sample crash-landed on Iscandar and was rescued by Starsha. In the original series, she nursed him back to health; the two fell in love, and he remained with her on Iscandar to rebuild its population. In 2199, he died before the Yamato arrived, leaving a recorded message and Starsha bearing a child (as discreetly implied at the end of Episode 24).
- While the Yamato has an all-Japanese crew, she flies as a United Nations ship. The United Nations logo is seen on the vessel and Okita talks to United Nations officials via long range communication, not officials serving Japan (Commanders Todo and Serizawa serve under UN). Furthermore, in 2199, the Yamato has no contact with Earth whatsoever beyond the heliosphere, even with hyperspace communication relays.
- In the early episodes of the original 1974 series, Garmilas characters had Caucasian skin tones. Desler also had a more yellowish skin tone in early appearances. This abruptly changed after episode ten when all Garmilas characters were given a blue skin tone to make them more alien in appearance. The discrepancy remains unexplained. In the 2199 series, the difference is justified by establishing Caucasian Garmilas characters such as Shultz, Gantz, Raleta, and Norran as Zaltzi, a subject race of Garmilas (blue skinned members being of the Imperial race). This also effectively establishes Garmilas as an interstellar empire that absorbs other races into its culture.
- The Garmilas Empire is shown using a number of robotic soldiers, possibly another nod to the Star Blazers dub, which needed to justify the enemy soldiers being shot at in order to make the original series less violent. But most likely they are simply an earlier introduction of the robot soldiers shown in the 1978 original series movie, "Farewell to Space Battleship Yamato."
- Starsha reveals in 2199 that the Iscandarians developed the technology used in, and were the first to use, weapons similar to the Yamato's Wave Motion Gun. No mention of this was made in the original.
- In the original, the Cosmo Reverser was assembled during its return voyage. In 2199, Starsha not only had the device assembled in Iscandar, but also reconfigured the Yamato to accommodate it (which involved plugging the Wave Motion Gun's barrel).
- Yuki's death at the end of both series were portrayed differently.
- Sukeharu Yabu was portrayed differently in 2199. In the original, Yabu was a deserter who, along with twelve others, perished on an unstable island in Iscandar. In 2199, Yabu is a mutineer, but most of his companions died during the final encounter with General Domel, and one of them died on a prison planet. Yabu, mistaken for a Zaltzi, ends up becoming a crew member of the submarine under Captain Flakken.

== Reception ==
Kotaku reviewer Richard Eisenbeis praised Yamato 2199, stating that "as a series, it succeeded on nearly every level. It took one of the classic 70s anime, Space Battleship Yamato (called Starblazers in the West), and brought it to a new generation by adding new characters, a deeper story, and stunning visuals"; however, he also gave the film A Voyage to Remember an unequivocally negative judgment. In his review, Eisenbeis noted that unlike many other recap anime movies, A Voyage to Remember added virtually no meaningful new content to the Yamato 2199 story. He went on to point out that the twenty-six episodes of the series had already been shown in cinemas and therefore did not benefit from an additional big screen showing, and with nine and a half hours of original story cut to two and a half for the recap film, backstory and character development were almost completely sacrificed.

The series generated ¥10 billion ($125 million) in merchandise sales.
