= Star Blazers: Space Battleship Yamato 2205 =

Japanese military science fiction animation film

- Star Blazers 2205
- Poster of the first film of the duology

宇宙戦艦ヤマト2205 新たなる旅立ち (Uchū Senkan Yamato 2205 Aratanaru Tabidachi)
- Genre: Adventure, military science fiction, space opera
- Created by: Leiji Matsumoto; Yoshinobu Nishizaki
- Anime film

Takeoff
- Directed by: Kenji Yasuda
- Produced by: Kumiko Nakagawa; Mizuki Amekawa
- Written by: Harutoshi Fukui (Note: Series composition and screenplay); Hideki Oka (Note: Screenplay)
- Music by: Akira Miyagawa; Hiroshi Miyagawa
- Studio: Satelight (Note: Animation production (アニメーション制作)); Staple Entertainment (Note: Main production (制作メイン))
- Released: October 8, 2021
- Runtime: 97 minutes
- Anime film

Stasha
- Directed by: Kenji Yasuda
- Produced by: Kumiko Nakagawa; Mizuki Amekawa
- Written by: Harutoshi Fukui; Hideki Oka
- Music by: Akira Miyagawa; Hiroshi Miyagawa
- Studio: Satelight; Staple Entertainment
- Released: February 4, 2022
- Runtime: 102 minutes
- Anime television series

TV Edition
- Directed by: Kenji Yasuda
- Produced by: Kumiko Nakagawa; Mizuki Amekawa
- Written by: Harutoshi Fukui; Hideki Oka
- Music by: Akira Miyagawa; Hiroshi Miyagawa
- Studio: Satelight; Staple Entertainment
- Licensed by: Crunchyroll
- Original network: BS11 and others
- Original run: May 2, 2022 – June 19, 2022
- Episodes: 8
- Related
- Star Blazers: Space Battleship Yamato 2199 (2012 film series); Star Blazers: Space Battleship Yamato 2202 (2017 film series); Star Blazers: Space Battleship Yamato 3199 (2024 film series)

Star Blazers 2205, known in Japan as Space Battleship Yamato 2205: The New Voyage (宇宙戦艦ヤマト2205 新たなる旅立ち, Uchū Senkan Yamato Ni-ni-zero-go Aratanaru Tabidachi), is a Japanese military science fiction animated film duology produced by Satelight and Staple Entertainment. It is the sequel to Star Blazers: Space Battleship Yamato 2202 and a remake to the 1979 film Space Battleship Yamato: The New Voyage, originally based on the Space Battleship Yamato television series created by Yoshinobu Nishizaki and Leiji Matsumoto. It is directed by Kenji Yasuda (Macross Delta) and written by Harutoshi Fukui (Mobile Suit Gundam Unicorn) with official character designs by Nobuteru Yuki. The first film, with the subtitle Part 1: Takeoff (前章 —TAKEOFF—, Zenshō Teikuofu; lit. "Opening Chapter: Takeoff") was released in Japanese theaters on October 8, 2021. The second film with the subtitle Part 2: Stasha (後章 —STASHA—, Kōshō Sutasha; lit. "Closing Chapter: Stasha") was released in Japanese theaters on February 4, 2022. Later that year the films were broadcast on TV as eight episodes.

== Story ==
Almost two years after the conclusion of the war with Gatlantis, Desler has discovered the world of Galman, whose conditions are an exact match with Gamilas and its natives are identical to Gamilans, suggesting Galman is their original homeworld. Desler overthrows the Bolar Federation's tyrannical rule over the planet and begins the process of transferring the population of Gamilas to Galman. However, an unknown force destroys Gamilas in the middle of the evacuation process and warps the entire planet of Iscandar away.

Meanwhile, Earth has rebuilt the Yamato with Kodai as its captain. The Yamato also leads its own fleet now, with the support ship Asuka commanded by Yuki and the carrier Hyuga commanded by Sanada. With much of the crews of all three ships composed of fresh recruits, the fleet heads out on a six month training mission and diplomatic visit to Gamilas. However, upon hearing of the destruction of Gamilas and the disappearance of Iscandar, Kodai disobeys orders from HQ and heads over to save Iscandar and the Gamilas refugees trapped on the planet.

Upon catching up with Iscandar and linking up with Desler's fleet, the Yamato fleet learns that an alien civilization called the Dezariam are attempting to steal Iscandar and the valuable knowledge it holds within. Starsha summons both Kodai and Desler and admits the truth about Iscandar and Gamilas. Iscandar at the height of its power decided to preserve civilizations by completely destroying them and saving their memories into crystals, though eventually the Iscandarians converted themselves into crystals to live eternally in their own memories. In order to keep Iscandar protected, they kidnapped people from Galman, transported them to Gamilas, and conditioned the entire race to worship them. Desler is shocked by the revelation, but remains committed to saving Starsha due to his love for her, heading out to engage in a final battle with the Dezariam. Kodai manages to convince Starsha and Yurisha to escape while planting a bomb in the Dezariam mothership, completely destroying it.

However, in order to keep Iscandar's memories out of Dezariam hands for good, and as penance for Iscandar's past sins, Starsha self destructs the entire planet. She then has a final farewell with Desler while Yurisha entrusts Starsha and Mamoru Kodai's child Sasha to Kodai and Yuki. Starsha and Yurisha then fade away due to their existence being tied to Iscandar. With newfound respect for each other, Desler and Kodai go their separate ways, with Desler leading the rescued refugees to Galman while the Yamato continues its journey.

Later, Sanada and Niimi analyze pictures of the interior of the Dezariam mothership and are shocked to find the wrecks of Andromeda-class warships that shouldn't exist until farther into the future, suggesting the Dezariam are capable of time travel.

== Production ==
The film was first announced on March 29, 2019, as revealed by Fukui himself and series former director Nobuyoshi Habara alongside Daisuke Ono. However they didn't reveal what format the sequel will be. Fukui revealed the title of the film following the Yamato concert event on January 10, 2020, alongside the compilation film detailing the events of Yamato 2202. The official website for Yamato 2202 was later updated regarding the upcoming film, revealing new staff to take the helm in the film's production. Kenji Yasuda replaces Nobuyishi Habara as director while returning staff from the previous movie were brought in with Hideki Oka for the scripts, Akira Miyagawa for the music and Junichirō Tamamori, Yasuchi Ishizu and Mika Akitaka were brought in for both ship designs and mechanical designs. On June 11, 2021, it was announced that the films will be a duology set after the events of 2202 and will be a remake of the 1979 film Space Battleship Yamato: The New Voyage. Alongside the first film's subtitle and its release date of October 8, 2021, info on the returning cast to reprise their roles in the film as well as introducing new characters and ship designs was also revealed. After the first film's premiere, it was announced that the second part of the film series will have a release date of February 4, 2022.
