= Space Battleship Yamato =

Anime series that started in 1974

- Cover of Leiji Matsumoto's manga adaptation

宇宙戦艦ヤマト (Uchū Senkan Yamato)
- Genre: Military sci-fi, space opera
- Created by: Leiji Matsumoto (Note: Original Work (原作)); Yoshinobu Nishizaki; Eiichi Yamamoto (Note: Original Plan (原案))
- Manga
- Written by: Leiji Matsumoto
- Published by: Akita Shoten
- English publisher: NA: Seven Seas Entertainment
- Magazine: Bōken Ō
- Original run: October 1, 1974 – November 1, 1979
- Volumes: 3
- Anime television series
- Directed by: Leiji Matsumoto
- Produced by: Yoshinobu Nishizaki
- Written by: Story; Yoshinobu Nishizaki; Screenplay; Eiichi Yamamoto; Keisuke Fujikawa; Maru Tamura
- Music by: Hiroshi Miyagawa
- Studio: Academy Productions
- Original network: NNS (YTV)
- Original run: October 6, 1974 – March 30, 1975
- Episodes: 26
- Sequels
- TV series: Space Battleship Yamato II (1978); Space Battleship Yamato III (1980); Animated films: Space Battleship Yamato (1977, compilation movie); Arrivederci Yamato (1978); Yamato: The New Voyage (1979); Be Forever Yamato (1980); Final Yamato (1983); Yamato Resurrection (2009)
- Spin-offs
- Yamato 2520 (1994, OVA series); Great Yamato No. Zero (2004, OVA series)
- Remakes
- Space Battleship Yamato (2010, live-action film); Yamato 2199 (2012, TV series); Odyssey of the Celestial Ark (2014, film); Yamato 2202 (2017, TV series); Yamato 2205 (2021, film duology); Yamato 3199 (2024, TV series)
- icon

UNCF Yamato (大和)
- Space Battleship Yamato vehicle
- First appearance: "SOS Earth! Revive Space Battleship Yamato!" (Japanese: SOS地球!!甦れ宇宙戦艦ヤマト); October 6, 1974
- Based on: Japanese battleship Yamato

Information
- Affiliation: Earth Defense Force (original series); UNSA Defense Force of Earth (live-action); United Nations Cosmo Force (remake series)
- Launched: 2199
- Decommissioned: 2199 (live-action)
- Captain: Juzo Okita
- Combat vehicles: Cosmo Tiger; Cosmo Zero; Cosmo Python (remake)
- Auxiliary vehicles: Live-action: At least 1 Armored transport aircraft C-2101 Leonne Type-Y; Remake: 2 SC97 Cosmo Seagulls; 2 Type 100 Space Reconnaissance Planes; 1 Ki-8 Prototype Air Boat; 2 Type 90 Motor Boats; 6 Special Type 2 Multi-purpose Conversion Vehicles; At least 2 repair barges; Cosmo Hound

General characteristics
- Registry: BBY-01
- Armaments: Original: 1x Wave Motion Gun; 5x Shock Cannon turrets (3x 46cm [2 fore, 1 aft], 2x 15.5cm [1 fore, 1 aft]); Pulse lasers; 8x dorsal SAM launch tubes; 8x ventral SAM launch tubes; 28x Torpedo Tubes (6x fore, 6x aft, 8x starboard, 8x port); Remake: 200 cm barrel wave motion gun; 3 triple-barreled 48 cm positron shock cannons; 2 triple-barreled 20 cm positron shock cannons; 6 forward torpedo launch tubes; 6 aft torpedo launch tubes; 16 torpedo launch tubes, 8 per side; 10 bottom missile launch tubes; 1 eight-barrel missile launcher; 2 Type 94 Depth Charge Launchers; 8 12.7cm quadruple high-angle rapid-fire pulse laser turrets; 2 8.8cm triple high-angle rapid-fire pulse laser turrets; 8 12.7cm twin high-angle rapid-fire pulse laser turrets; 18 7.5cm twin high-angle rapid-fire pulse laser turrets; 4 7.5cm triple rapid-fire machine pulse laser turret; 2 conning tower close-defense firearms
- Defenses: Wave Motion Shield
- Maximum speed: 30 "Space Knots" (conversion unknown)
- Propulsion: Sublight engines Wave Motion Engine

Space Battleship Yamato (Japanese: 宇宙戦艦ヤマト, Hepburn: Uchū Senkan Yamato; also called Cosmoship Yamato and Star Blazers) is a Japanese science fiction anime series written by Yoshinobu Nishizaki, directed by manga artist Leiji Matsumoto, and produced by Academy Productions. (Note: Run by Nishizaki, later bankrupt; now absorbed into Toei Animation.) The series aired in Yomiuri TV from October 6, 1974, to March 30, 1975, totaling up to 26 episodes. It revolves around the character Susumu Kodai (Derek Wildstar in the English version) and an international crew from Earth, tasked during an interstellar war to go into space aboard the space warship Yamato, derived from the World War II battleship of the same name, in response to a message of aid from the planet Iscandar in order to retrieve a device which is able to reverse the radiation infecting Earth after being bombed by the Gamilas (Gamilons).

Space Battleship Yamato is one of the most influential anime series in Japan. Its turn toward serious themes and complex storylines influenced later works in the medium, including Gundam, Macross, and Evangelion, in addition to influencing the style of video games such as Space Invaders.

== Development ==
The first ideas for what would eventually be Space Battleship Yamato began in 1973 by producer Yoshinobu Nishizaki, but the project underwent a number of revisions and overhauls before settling on the final design. The team responsible for the creation of Space Battleship Yamato consisted of Yoshinobu Nishizaki, Keisuke Fujikawa, Eiichi Yamamoto and Aritsune Toyota. It was initially planned to be a tokusatsu, and Nishizaki was inspired to create something set in space after reading Methuselah's Children. Aritsune Toyota offered his 1970 novel Desecrated Earth (地球の汚名, Chikyū no Omei) as a further source of inspiration for Nishizaki.

In 1973, works such as The Poseidon Adventure and Japan Sinks were enjoying considerable success. Eiichi Yamamoto believed this was because of the way in which they depicted people being able to survive in extreme circumstances, and this influenced the creation of Yamato. Additionally, he believed that, overall, industrialisation caused people to become more miserable, and Yamato was designed to show a triumph of humanity and love.

Originally intended to be an outer-space variation on Lord of the Flies, the project at first was titled "Asteroid Ship Icarus" and had a crew from all over the world journeying through space in a hollowed-out asteroid in search of the planet Iscandar. There was to be much discord among the crew with many of them acting purely out of self-interest and for personal gain. The enemy aliens were originally called Rajendora. The Rajendorians were robots whose exact form was unknown, and it was to be revealed towards the end of the story that the Rajendorians, along with the rest of the life on their home planet, had died over a hundred years ago.

The first rough draft of Yamato came towards the end of summer 1973, where the Yamato (named as such by Nishizaki) was a regular spaceship, that used a large rock as a shell, and the story was notably darker. Heavier emphasis was placed on the character's flaws, who were overall more misanthropic, and only one of them would survive until the end of the series.

The production of Yamato in its conceptual stage was overseen by Eiichi Yamamoto, until 1974, when he had to leave to work on a documentary film. As a replacement, Toshio Masuda, who had worked on Tora! Tora! Tora!, was considered, but had to decline as he had other projects of his own to focus on, though he would become involved in the production of the 1977 film. The role was given to Leiji Matsumoto, who had at an earlier stage declined an offer, due to his desire to have complete creative control. Matsumoto overhauled the story, designing the titular ship after the IJN Yamato, its crew, and the Wave Motion Gun, which came from Sexaroid, an erotic comedy manga written by Matsumoto in 1968.

In the earliest stages of production, Space Battleship Yamato was planned to be 52 episodes in length, before reducing this to 39, and ultimately, 26. The bulk of the cut content centered around Gamilas, who had more characters, and more complex motivations and goals. Additionally, in this earlier stage, the Yamato's battles were more closely tied to events in World War II – for example, the battle near Neptune in the first episode represented Germany circumventing the Maginot Line.

The first draft for Space Battleship Yamato was completed on May 21, 1974. In August, a ten-minute pilot episode was created, with at least nine copies being sent to the relevant organisations, and, after the pilot's success, pre-production of the anime began, with the first episode airing in October that year. The original series contained 26 episodes, following the Yamato's voyage out of the Milky Way and back again. A continuing story, it featured the declining health of Yamato's Captain Okita (Avatar in the Star Blazers dub), and the transformation of the brash young orphan Susumu Kodai (Derek Wildstar) into a mature officer, as well as his budding romance with female crewmember Yuki Mori (Nova Forrester). The foreign edits tend to play up the individual characters, while the Japanese original is often more focused on the ship itself. In a speech at the 1995 Anime Expo, series episode director Noboru Ishiguro said low ratings and high production expenses forced producer Yoshinobu Nishizaki to trim down the episode count from the original 39 episodes to only 26. The cut episodes would have introduced Captain Harlock as a new series character.

== Storyline ==
=== Original series ===
In the year 2199, Earth is threatened by the Gamilons, an alien race that has been bombing Earth for around five years. The last line of defense is at Pluto, where Captain Juzo Okita, alongside Mamoru Kodai, command the Earth Defense Force's remaining vessels. Gamilon forces ask the Earth Fleet to surrender and in the English version (Star Blazers) Okita tells the Gamilon fleet that they are "idiots". The Gamilons proceed to destroy the Earth fleet, except for the Yukikaze, commanded by Mamoru and the Kongou, commanded by Okita. Mamoru decides to stay behind so Okita can retreat to Earth.

During the battle, an unknown spacecraft, neither Terran nor Gamilon, is detected by the Kongou. The craft reaches Mars, where it jettisons a capsule prior to crashing to the surface. Earth Defense Force orders two space cadets commanding the Mars center, Susumu Kodai—Mamoru Kodai's younger brother—and Daisuke Shima, to investigate. The pair investigate the wreckage and discover a humanoid alien who apparently died after exiting the smaller capsule. The cadets also find a small capsule near the alien's body, which the two deliver to Earth Defense Force. The capsule contains a message from a distant planet known as "Iscandar", ruled by Queen Starsha. In the message, Starsha says that she has the means to restore Earth to normal using "Cosmo DNA", but that she is unable to send it to Earth herself. However, Starsha states that the capsule contains plans for the "Wave Motion Engine", which can propel a ship at faster-than-light speeds and allow Earth to come to Iscandar to get the Cosmo DNA. It would also be able to shoot heated up energy, at its front end, known as the "Wave Motion Cannon". By this point in the series, Earth's radiation was already seeping underground, and it would take an entire year to wipe out the underground cities all of earth were living in. To try to combat this, the EDF, alongside the entire world, started a plan to use an old WWII battleship as the last saving grace of the entire Earth population.

While the Yamato was being rebuilt underground, a scout jet from the Gamilon base on Pluto flew around the Yamato's "wreckage", alarms sounded throughout the EDF base, which led to Susumu Kodai and Daisuke Shima flying off to the wreckage without orders. They started fighting the scout plane, which was much faster and more agile than the fighter jet Kodai and Shima were in. Their fighter jet crashed into the ground near the Yamato, and they crossed over a hill and saw the Yamato's wreckage, which was hiding the Space Battleship under the rocks.

In episode three, the rebuilt Yamato, still hiding under the wreckage of the old battleship, has to do an emergency launch as the Gamilon base on Pluto sends a missile referred to in Star Blazers as the "Ultra Menace Missile". Susumu Kodai and Daisuke Shima are called to the Yamato to test out the systems before the eventual launch. When the crew of the Yamato learn of the danger headed towards the wreckage itself, the Yamato launches and Susumu Kodai, chief of the tactical unit, manages to fire the Yamato's shock cannons at the Ultra Menace Missile. It looked as if the Yamato had been destroyed, but to much of the EDF's surprise, the Yamato came out unscathed, flying through the clouds of the explosion that just happened. In the series, every episode, around 1–10 days are taken off the deadline to return home from Iscandar. At this point in time, the Yamato had 364 days left until the human population would die from the radiation.

After the Yamato took off from Earth, it had arrived at the Moon, where the first space warp would occur. In the series, the timing would have to be perfect enough that it hit the middle of going in between the third dimension and the fourth dimension. The warp goes almost perfectly as they arrive at Mars, completing the first of many warps along the mission to Iscandar.

After warping to Mars, it flew by, headed for planet Jupiter, which had a huge magnetic field. By the time it crossed the inter-planetary space between Mars and Jupiter, Jupiter's gravity started pulling the Yamato in. Then, the Yamato fell into a methane sea upon Jupiter's bands of gas and clouds. The Yamato detected a floating continent using infrared technology, but its video panel couldn't show it yet due to the dense clouds and gas on Jupiter. As it fought against the gravity of Jupiter, Susumu Kodai went to check out the floating continent, and was attacked by a Gamilon fighter pilot. After a while it was decided to use the Wave Motion Gun for the first time against the floating continent. The Yamato got into position in front of the floating continent. The gun charged up and fired at the floating continent, destroying it completely, and killing the gamilons on the base.

=== Original film edition ===
The series was condensed into a 130-minute-long movie by combining elements from a few key episodes of the first season. Additional animation was created for the movie (such as the scenes on Iscandar) or recycled from the series' test footage (such as the opening sequence). The movie, which was released in Japan on August 6, 1977, was edited down further and dubbed into English in 1978; entitled Space Cruiser Yamato or simply Space Cruiser, it was only given a limited theatrical release in Europe and Latin America, where it was called Patrulha Estelar (Star Patrol, in Brazilian Portuguese) or Astronave Intrepido (Starship Intrepid, in Spanish), though it was later released on video in most countries.

== Factions ==
=== Earth Federation ===
The Earth Federation or just Earth, is a nation which controls the entirety of planet Earth. It was founded in 2201, after Earth won once the Yamato returned to Earth in late August-early September 2200 (as shown in the original movie).

==== History ====
Before the Earth Federation, the United Nations was the main liberation force for Planet Earth during the Earth-Gamilas War, which lasted from 2191 to 2200, after the Battle of Gamilas occurred. It was founded in 1945 after the fall of the Japanese Empire, and lasted until 2201 when it was officially turned into the Earth Federation.

=== Great Gamilas Empire ===
the Great Gamilas Empire, or simply Gamilas (also known as Gamilon in the English dub), is an alien empire located mainly in the Large Magellanic Cloud alongside its twin planet, Iscandar. It is led by Supreme Leader Dessler (or Leader Desslok) and Deputy Leader Hyss (or General Krypt).

==== History ====
In Space Battleship Yamato III, it is revealed that the people of Gamilas, came from Planet Galman, from which they were brought by presumably Starsha of Iscandar to its sister planet, which became the home for the Gamilas people.

===== 2200 =====
In 2200, Gamilas was at threat of falling to earth, as around two months earlier, at the "Battle of the Rainbow Star Cluster" General Domel (Lysis) who was commanding the fleet that was meant to take out the Yamato, got defeated by self-destructing his ship below the Yamato.

===== Battle of Gamilas =====
After the Battle of the Rainbow Star Cluster, the Yamato was en route to Iscandar, but got caught in a magnetic radio jammer gas, which was beamed by the Gamilas.

== Sequels ==
=== Farewell to Space Battleship Yamato (1978) ===
The success of the Yamato movie in Japan led to the production of a second movie that would end the story. Also going by the name Arrivederci Yamato, Farewell to Space Battleship Yamato, set in the year 2201, shows the Yamato crew going up against the White Comet Empire, a mobile city fortress called Gatlantis, from the Andromeda Galaxy. A titanic space battle results in the crew going out on a suicide mission to save humanity. The film has been considered as a non-canonical, alternate timeline.

=== Space Battleship Yamato II (1978) ===
Viewer dissatisfaction with the ending of Arrivederci Yamato prompted the production of a second Yamato television season which retconned the film and presented a slightly different plot against Emperor Zwordar (Prince Zordar in the Star Blazers dub) and his Comet Empire, and ended without killing off the Yamato or its primary characters. Like Arrivederci, the story is set in the year 2201, and expands the film story to 26 episodes. This second season featured additional plots such as a love story between Teresa (Trelaina) and Yamato crew member Daisuke Shima (Mark Venture), and an onboard antagonism between Kodai and Saito (Knox), leader of a group of space marines.

Footage from Arrivederci Yamato was reused in the second season, particularly in the opening titles. The sequence of the Yamato launching from water was also reused in two of the subsequent movies.

=== Yamato: The New Voyage (1979) ===
The television movie Yamato: The New Voyage (aka Bon Voyage Yamato), came next, featuring a new enemy, the Black Nebula Empire. The story opens in late 2201. In the film, later modified into a theatrical movie, Dessler sees his home world, Gamilas, destroyed by the grey-skinned aliens, and its twin planet Iscandar next in line for invasion. He finds an eventual ally in the Yamato, then on a training mission under deputy captain Kodai.

=== Be Forever Yamato (1980) ===
The theatrical movie Be Forever Yamato, set in the year 2202, sees the Black Nebula Empire launch a powerful weapon at Earth, a hyperon bomb which will annihilate humanity if they resist a full-scale invasion. The Yamato, under new captain, Yamanami, travels to the aliens' home galaxy only to discover what appears to be a future Earth—defeated and ruled by the enemy. Appearing in this film is Sasha, the daughter of Queen Starsha of Iscandar and Mamoru Kodai (Susumu's older brother).

=== Space Battleship Yamato III (1980) ===
Following these movies, a third season of the television series was produced, broadcast on Japanese television in 1980. Its date was not mentioned in the broadcast, but design documents, as well as anime industry publications, cited the year 2205 as the time it takes place. In the story, the Sun is hit by a stray proton missile from a nearby battle between forces of the Galman Empire and Bolar Federation. This missile greatly accelerates nuclear fusion in the Sun, and humanity must either evacuate to a new home or find a means of preventing a supernova. During the course of the story, it is learned that the people of the Galman Empire are actually the forebears of Dessler and the Gamilas race. Dessler and the remnants of his space fleet have found and liberated Galman from the Bolar Federation. Originally conceived as a 52-episode story, funding cuts meant the season had to be truncated to 25 episodes, with a corresponding loss of overall story development. This third season was adapted into English several years after the original Star Blazers run and, to the dissatisfaction of fans, used different voice actors than the earlier seasons.

=== Final Yamato (1983) ===
Premiering in Japanese theaters on March 19, 1983, Final Yamato reunites the crew one more time to combat the threat of the Denguilu, a militaristic alien civilization that intends to use the water planet, Aquarius, to flood Earth and resettle there, having lost their home planet to a galactic collision. Captain Okita, who was found to be in cryogenic sleep since the first season, returns to command the Yamato and sacrifices himself to stop the Denguili's plan. Kodai and Yuki also get married.

The story is set in the year 2203, contradicting earlier assumptions that its predecessor, Yamato III, took place in 2205.

=== Yamato: Resurrection (2009) ===
Although New Space Battleship Yamato was abandoned, Nishizaki promptly began work on a new movie titled Yamato: Resurrection (宇宙戦艦ヤマト 復活篇, Uchū Senkan Yamato: Fukkatsu hen), set after the original series, while Matsumoto planned a new Yamato series. However, additional legal conflicts stalled both projects until August 2008, when Nishizaki announced plans for the release of his film on December 12, 2009.

Set 17 years after the events of Final Yamato, Resurrection brings together some members of the Yamato crew, who lead Earth's inhabitants to resettle in a far-flung star system after a black hole which will destroy the Solar System in three months is discovered.

== Spin-offs ==
=== Yamato 2520 (1994-1996) ===
In the mid-1990s, Nishizaki attempted to create a sequel to Yamato, set hundreds of years after the original. Yamato 2520 was to chronicle the adventures of the eighteenth starship to bear the name, and its battle against the Seiren Federation. Much of the continuity established in the original series (including the destruction of Earth's moon) is ignored in this sequel.

In place of Leiji Matsumoto, American artist Syd Mead, known for works such as ∀ Gundam, and Blade Runner, provided the conceptual art.

Due to the bankruptcy of Nishizaki's company West Cape Corp (former Academy Productions), and legal disputes with Matsumoto over the ownership of the Yamato copyrights, the series was never finished and only three episodes (out of ten) were produced and released on home video.

=== Great Yamato No. Zero (2004) ===
- Great Yamato No. Zero
- Great Yamato No. Zero poster

大ヤマト零号 (Dai Yamato Zero-go)
- Original video animation
- Directed by: Tomoharu Katsumata
- Produced by: Masamitsu Haga; Takahiro Kanamori
- Written by: Yasushi Arai
- Music by: Hiroshi Miyagawa
- Studio: JCF Studios
- Released: March 31, 2004 – June 15, 2007
- Runtime: 35–45 minutes (each)
- Episodes: 5

Great Yamato No. Zero (大ヤマト零号, Dai Yamato Zero-go) is the second original animated video based on Space Battleship Yamato. It was released in five episodes from 2004 to 2007. Its first episode was temporarily available for streaming online in 2007. Unable to continue his plans for the Great Yamato project after a copyright shift in March 2002, Leiji Matsumoto radically redesigned the ship and staffed it with a completely new crew starting with modified versions of his Great Yamato characters.

The story begins in 3199, when a mighty enemy attacks the Milky Way from a neighbouring galaxy, and defeats the Milky Way Alliance, reducing them to just six fleets. After the Alliance headquarters is destroyed, and when the collapse of the central Milky Way Alliance is imminent, the Great Yamato "Zero" embarks on a mission to assist the Milky Way Alliance in one last great battle.

=== New Space Battleship Yamato (2004, cancelled) ===
In March 2002, a Tokyo court ruled that Yoshinobu Nishizaki legally owned the Yamato copyrights. Nishizaki and Matsumoto eventually settled, and Nishizaki pushed ahead with developing a new Yamato television series. Project proposals for a 26-episode television series were drawn up in early 2004, but no further work was done with Tohoku Shinsha not backing the project. American series expert Tim Eldred was able to secure a complete package of art, mecha designs, and story outline at an auction over Japanese store Mandarake in April 2014.

Set 20 years after Final Yamato, the series would have shown Susumu Kodai leading a salvage operation for the remains of the Yamato. The ship is rebuilt as the Earth Defense Force builds a second Space Battleship Yamato to combat the Balbard Empire, an alien race that has erected a massive honeycombed cage called Ru Sak Gar over Earth, in a bid to stop the human race's spacefaring efforts. A feature film to be released after the series ended would have featured the original space battleship fighting the Balbards' attempt to launch a black hole at Earth. Kodai, Yuki, and Sanada are the only original series characters who would have returned in the series.

== Remakes ==
=== Live-action film (2010) ===
Released on December 1, 2010, Space Battleship Yamato is the franchise's first live-action film. Directed by Takashi Yamazaki, the movie stars Takuya Kimura as Susumu Kodai and Meisa Kuroki as Yuki. It was revealed originally that the plot would be based on that of the 1974 series. However, an official trailer released during June 2010 on Japanese television has also shown elements from the series' second season (1978). The film had a budget of over ¥2 billion, and was the fourth highest grossing Japanese live-action film of the year, and the 31st highest grossing Japanese film of all time at the time of release.

=== Yamato 2199 (2012) ===
Debuting in Japanese cinemas on April 7, 2012, 2199 is a remake of the 1974 series. Yutaka Izubuchi serves as supervising director, with character designs by Nobuteru Yuki, and Junichiro Tamamori and Makoto Kobayashi in charge of mecha and conceptual designs. The series is a joint project of Xebec and AIC. Hideaki Anno designed the new series' opening sequence.

=== Yamato 2202 (2017) ===
The sequel to the first remake heptalogy, and debuting in Japanese cinemas on February 25, 2017, 2202 is a remake of the second series, with Nobuyoshi Habara as director and Harutoshi Fukui as writer. Most of the staff and original cast from the first remake were brought back to the project. It is also the final animated project by then-defunct Xebec, returning to animate the series.

=== Yamato 2205 (2021) ===
The sequel to the second remake heptalogy, it debuted in Japanese cinemas on October 8, 2021. 2205 is a remake of the film Space Battleship Yamato: The New Voyage. Kenji Yasuda directed the film while Harutoshi Fukui returned as writer. It is the first Yamato work animated by Satelight.

=== Be Forever Yamato: Rebel 3199 (2024) ===
A sequel in the remake series, 3199 was announced in January 2022 and is a remake of both Be Forever Yamato and Space Battleship Yamato III. The series was released in theatres and on TV streaming simultaneously, with a total of seven films running for twenty-six episodes, beginning on July 19, 2024. Naomichi Yamato and Fukui directed, with Fukui also returning as writer. The series is animated by Studio Mother and Satelight.

== Timeline(s) ==
With the retelling of Arrivederci Yamato as the open-ended Yamato II television series (ending in late 2201), Arrivederci was redesignated as a discardable, alternate timeline. The follow-on film, Yamato: The New Voyage, took place in late 2201; and its successor, Be Forever Yamato, in early 2202. Yamato III was commonly believed to be set in 2205 (several printed publications used this date, although it was never stated in the show's broadcast). But the following film, Final Yamato, was set in 2203. The opening narration of Final mentioned the Bolar/Galman conflict, implying that the date for Yamato III was to be regarded as some time between 2202 and 2203 (making for an unrealistic and compressed timeline).

It is not known if this change was due to the lackluster response to Yamato III, the production staff's dissatisfaction with the truncated series (additionally, Nishizaki and Matsumoto had limited involvement with it), or a mere oversight.

In 2220, the ship is rebuilt following the events of Final Yamato. The new captain of the ship is Susumu Kodai, who was the main character in the previous movies. It is stated in Space Battleship Yamato: Resurrection that it is set 17 years after Final Yamato.

=== Original continuity ===
- 2199–2200: Space Battleship Yamato (1974–1975) / Yamato: The Movie (1977)
- 2201: Arrivederci Yamato (1978) / Space Battleship Yamato II (1978–1979), Yamato: The New Voyage (1979)
- 2202: Be Forever Yamato (1980)
- 2203: Space Battleship Yamato III (1980–1981), Final Yamato (1983)
- 2220: Yamato: Resurrection (2009)
- 2520: Yamato 2520 (1995–1996) (unfinished)
- 3199: Great Yamato No. 0 (2004–2007) (unofficial)

=== Remakes ===
- 2199: Space Battleship Yamato (2010, live action) / Yamato 2199 (2012–2013), Odyssey of the Celestial Ark (2014)
- 2202–2203: Space Battleship Yamato 2202 (2017–2019)
- 2205: Space Battleship Yamato 2205 (2021–2022)
- 2207: Be Forever Yamato: Rebel 3199 (2024–2026)

== Staff ==
Series / Film	Staff				Studio
Series / Film	Director	Producer	Story	Screenplay	Studio
Space Battleship Yamato (1974 series)	Leiji Matsumoto	Yoshinobu Nishizaki		Keisuke Fujikawa, Eiichi Yamamoto & Maru Tamura	Academy Productions
Space Battleship Yamato (1977 film)	Toshio Masuda	Yoshinobu Nishizaki		Keisuke Fujikawa & Eiichi Yamamoto	Academy Productions
Arrivederci Yamato	Toshio Masuda	Tooru Yoshida	Leiji Matsumoto	Keisuke Fujikawa & Eiichi Yamamoto	Academy Productions
Space Battleship Yamato II	Noboru Ishiguro	Osamu Hirooka	Leiji Matsumoto	Keisuke Fujikawa & Eiichi Yamamoto	Academy Productions
Yamato: The New Voyage	Yoshinobu Nishizaki	Tooru Yoshida	Leiji Matsumoto	Eiichi Yamamoto	Academy Productions
Be Forever Yamato	Tomoharu Katsumata	Tooru Yoshida	Leiji Matsumoto	Toshio Masuda	Academy Productions
Space Battleship Yamato III	Eiichi Yamamoto	Osamu Yamane & Motoo Fukuo	Eiichi Yamamoto	Keisuke Fujikawa & Eiichi Yamamoto	Academy Productions
Final Yamato	Takeshi Shirato	Masahisa Saeki	Eiichi Yamamoto	Kazuo Kasahara	Academy Productions
Yamato 2520	Takeshi Shirato	Yoshinobu Nishizaki		Eiichi Yamamoto & Yasushi Hirano	Studio Take-Off
Great Yamato No. Zero	Tomoharu Katsumata	Masamitsu Haga & Takahiro Kanamori	Leiji Matsumoto	Yasushi Arai	JCF Studios
Yamato Resurrection	Yoshinobu Nishizaki	Toshio Masuda & Takeshi Shirato	Yoshinobu Nishizaki	Bull Ishihara & Atsuhiro Tomioka	Enagio
Yamato 2199	Akihiro Enomoto	Atsushi Ariyoshii; Hideaki Matsumoto; Fumi Teranishi & Mikio Gunji	Yutaka Izubuchi	Yutaka Izubuchi, Hiroshi Ōnogi, Sadayuki Murai & Shigeru Morita	Xebec & AIC
Odyssey of the Celestial Ark	Makoto Bessho	Fumi Teranishi & Mikio Gunji	Yutaka Izubuchi	Yutaka Izubuchi & Hiroshi Ōnogi	Xebec
Yamato 2202	Nobuyoshi Habara	Hirotaka Furukawa	Harutoshi Fukui	Harutoshi Fukui & Hideki Oka	Xebec
Yamato 2205: Takeoff	Kenji Yasuda	Kumiko Nakagawa & Mizuki Amekawa	Harutoshi Fukui	Harutoshi Fukui & Hideki Oka	Satelight
Yamato 2205: Stasha	Kenji Yasuda	Kumiko Nakagawa & Mizuki Amekawa	Harutoshi Fukui	Harutoshi Fukui & Hideki Oka	Satelight
Yamato 3199	Harutoshi Fukui & Naomichi Yamato	Shōji Nishizaki	Harutoshi Fukui	Harutoshi Fukui & Hideki Oka	Studio Mother

== Manga ==
=== Space Battleship Yamato (1974) ===
Leiji Matsumoto had written adaptations of Space Battleship Yamato, published in Akita Shoten's Bōken Ō magazine from November 1974 issue (released on October 1) to May 1975 issue (published on April 1) and collected into one volume, and Farewell to Space Battleship Yamato, published from July 1978 issue (released on June 1) to December 1979 issue (published on November 1) and collected into two volumes. Also included in the third volume is the gaiden manga Eternal Story of Jura, originally published in 1976 in Akita Shoten's Playcomic periodical.

Seven Seas Entertainment licensed the manga in 2017 and released it in English as hardcover omnibus Space Battleship Yamato: The Classic Collection on April 9, 2019.

=== Great Yamato (2000) ===
Space Battleship Great Yamato (新宇宙戦艦ヤマト, Shin Uchū Senkan Yamato; lit. "New Space Battleship Yamato") is a manga created by Leiji Matsumoto during his tenure as a copyright holder for Space Battleship Yamato (1998–2002). It was published in Shogakukan's monthly magazine Gotta Comics from February 2000 to October 2001 and partially collected into two volumes. It was set in the year 3199 and brought together the distant descendants of the Yamato crew to lift off in a much bigger version of the original ship. In 2001 Matsumoto, Columbia Records, and composer Hiroshi Miyagawa released a music album Symphonic Suite Great Yamato. In early 2002 Matsumoto announced his intentions to create an anime titled The Great Galaxy Series: The Tale of Great Yamato 7vs7. But Great Yamato was cut short when a court order in Japan blocked Matsumoto's further use of the copyright in March 2002.

== Video games ==
=== Arcade game ===
Space Battleship Yamato was a 1985 Japanese exclusive LaserDisc video game designed by Taito which was based on the television series of the same name. Game Machine listed Space Battleship Yamato on their August 1, 1985 issue as being the second most-successful upright/cockpit arcade unit of the month.

=== Game Boy game ===
Released in 1992 for the Game Boy, Space Battleship Yamato is a turn-based strategy game, with the player fighting against Dessler. The player can move a few places on the battlefield at a time, and, if they encounter an enemy, it will start a shoot 'em up section that they must complete without losing all their Cosmo Tigers in order to advance.

=== The Distant Planet Iscandar ===
Released in 1999 for the PlayStation, the game's story is based on original Yamato series, but incorporates events from Leiji Matsumoto's manga. The game requires the player to manage the Yamato, and its crew, flying the ship, attacking enemies, and using individual crewmen to invade enemy territory.

=== Farewell to Space Battleship Yamato, Soldiers of Love ===
Released in May 2000 for the PlayStation, this game is based on the events of Farewell to Space Battleship Yamato and Space Battleship Yamato II. It features the same basic gameplay as The Faraway Planet Iscandar, but allows for a branching story, with events coming from either Farewell to Space Battleship Yamato or Space Battleship Yamato II.

=== The Tracks of Heroes ===
Released in September 2000 for the PlayStation, this game is an original series fan disc based on the Leiji Matsumoto's 1976 manga Eternal Story of Jura.

=== Reminiscences of Iscandar ===
The first PlayStation 2 Yamato game, released in 2004, Reminiscences of Iscandar is more action-oriented than previous titles, focusing more on combat between the Yamato and Gamilas, rather than micromanaging the crew, though it is heavy on dialogue and cutscenes, which make up the majority of the content of the game.

=== Counterattack of the Dark Nebula ===
A March 2005 game, and the first Yamato game to be a third-person shooter, but still offers a branching story like the other games. It is the second in the PS2 trilogy of Yamato games.

=== Collapse of the Double Galaxy ===
An April 2005 game, and the third in the PS2 trilogy of Yamato games.

=== Typing games ===
Three separate Yamato typing games have been released – Typing Wave-Motion Gun (2000), Typing Warp (2001), and Typing Dispersion Wave-Motion Gun (2001).

=== Pachinko games ===
Three pachinko games for Space Battleship Yamato have been created, released in 2007, 2009, and 2013.

=== Space Battleship Yamato: Voyagers of Tomorrow ===
Space Battleship Yamato: Voyagers of Tomorrow is a browser game on the G123 platform based on the remake series and released in 2023.

== Merchandise ==
Due to its extensive financial success, Space Battleship Yamato has since its release seen a long line of merchandise.

Starting in 1974, many Yamato-themed products have been sold, including clothing, tableware, stationery, and models of the characters, with the Cosmo Tigers and Yamato itself receiving particular attention. Additionally, models of Dessler's fleet were available, and at the time it was uncommon for the villain's ships or mecha to be sold. Bandai was responsible for most of the merchandising, and their choice to sponsor Space Battleship Yamato at such an early stage of its production is considered influential in the company's financial success.

Bandai produced an extensive number of models of the Yamato, in a variety of sizes, the largest, and most elaborate one being a 70 cm (27.5 inch) model released in 2007. The ship comes with a remote control, designed to look like the Wave-Motion Gun's pistol grip, with which the Yamato's shutters, main and auxiliary guns, pulse lasers, and Wave-Motion Gun can all be interacted with. The ship was sold for ¥47,250 ($450).

== Legacy and impact ==
Initially, Space Battleship Yamato was ignored to the extent that the original 1974 anime halved its episode count due to low ratings and viewership. The release of the 1977 film brought a surge of popularity, however, ultimately achieving a cult status. During the original broadcast, despite the general lack of interest, Leiji Matsumoto received a "very surprising" amount of fan mail from women who had watched the show, which came as a surprise due to the fact he had intended for it to be watched mostly by a male audience.

Two or three months after the broadcast started, fans began to make frequent appearances at the studio. There were enthusiastic girls who came by plane from Kyushu and we gave them cels and background paintings as souvenirs because they had taken such great pains. Those cels now have the same street value as drugs, but in those days they were just a waste of space.

— Noboru Ishiguro, 1980

Prior to the release of Yamato in 1974, anime was called terebi manga (TV manga). The success of Yamato, both because of its tone and themes that were ambitious for an anime at that time, and the fact it was an original work, made it influential in the move towards the term anime.

=== Cultural impact ===
Space Battleship Yamato is one of the most influential anime series in Japan. Its turn towards more serious themes and complex storylines influenced future works in the sci-fi and mecha genre, including Gundam, Evangelion, and Macross.

Yamato would go on to influence many later anime, including Mobile Suit Gundam and Neon Genesis Evangelion. Its popularity subsequently lead to various parodies and references, such as in Sgt. Frog, Haruhi Suzumiya and Space Battleship Tiramisu.

Hideaki Anno has ranked Yamato as his favorite anime and credited it with sparking his interest in anime. Yamato was also the first anime series or movie to win the Seiun Award, a feat not repeated until the film Nausicaä of the Valley of the Wind (1984).

The later 1977 film Star Wars bears a number of similarities to the original 1974 Yamato series. For example, both are space opera works with militant empires, star ships and space battles; the robot R2D2 bears a strong resemblance to Analyzer in Yamato, in terms of both design and narrative function; and both works involve ship design blue-prints which are delivered by the female leads. Several critics have suggested that Yamato may have influenced Star Wars, though George Lucas did not mention it among his Japanese influences (such as Akira Kurosawa's samurai films).

Yamato also had an impact on video games. It was cited as an inspiration behind the influential shoot 'em up game Space Invaders. Game designer Takashi Nishiyama also credits the Wave Motion Gun as the origin of the Hadouken move in the Street Fighter series.

The 1980 kaiju film Gamera: Super Monster utilized stock footage of Space Battleship Yamato.

== Characters and themes ==
The Space Battleship Yamato series generally involves themes of brave sacrifice, noble enemies, and respect for heroes lost in the line of duty. This can be seen as early as the second episode of the first season, which recounts the defeat of the original battleship Yamato while sailors and pilots from both sides salute her as she sinks (this scene was cut from the English dub, but later included on the Star Blazers DVD release). The movies spend much time showing the crew visiting monuments to previous missions and recalling the bravery of their fallen comrades. Dessler, the enemy defeated in the first season and left without a home or a people, recognizes that his foes are fighting for the same things he fought for and, eventually, becomes an important and loyal ally to Earth.

== English-language title ==
For many years, English-language releases of the anime bore the title Space Cruiser Yamato. This romanization has appeared in Japanese publications because Nishizaki, a sailing enthusiast who owned a cruiser yacht, ordered that this translation be used out of love for his boat. However, in reference to naval nomenclature, it is technically inaccurate, as senkan (戦艦) means "battleship" and not "cruiser" (which in Japanese would be jun'yōkan (巡洋艦)). Leiji Matsumoto's manga adaptation was usually referred to as Cosmoship Yamato.

Star Blazers (1979) is a heavily edited dubbed version for the United States market produced by Westchester Film Corporation. Voyager Entertainment released DVD volumes and comic adaptations of the anime years later.

Contemporary Yamato releases, including the Voyager Entertainment DVD and Seven Seas Entertainment release of the manga, are marketed either as Star Blazers or Space Battleship Yamato.
