= Motoki Takagi =

Japanese voice actor (born 1980)

- 高城 元気
- Born: October 4, 1980 (age 46); Kanagawa Prefecture, Japan
- Occupation: Voice actor
- Years active: 1999–present
- Agent: I'm Enterprise

Motoki Takagi (高城 元気, Takagi Motoki; born October 4, 1980) is a Japanese voice actor. He is managed by I'm Enterprise, along with several other significant Japanese voice actors.

== Filmography ==
Bold denotes leading roles.

=== Television animation ===
2003

- Princess Tutu as Umazurakoomorinosuke
- Inuyasha as Young Miroku

2004

- Futakoi as **Nozomu Futami**

2005

- The Law of Ueki as Hayao Adachi
- Gallery Fake as Haruo Kikushima
- Damekko Dōbutsu as **Uruno**
- Pokémon Advance as Koroku
- Loveless as Loveless

2006

- Doraemon as Moteo Mote
- Demashitaa! Powerpuff Girls Z as Pepper Monster

2007

- ef: a tale of memories as **Renji Asō**
- Claymore as Raki
- Souten no Ken as Guang-Lin Pan (Young)
- You're Under Arrest: Full Throttle as Yano
- Toward the Terra as Jonah Matsuka

2008

- Ef: a tale of melodies. as Renji Asō
- Birdy the Mighty: Decode as Masayuki Hazawa
- Neo Angelique Abyss as Kai
- Hayate the Combat Butler as Male Classmate
- Persona -trinity soul- as Sōtarō Senō
- One Outs as Kurumizawa

2009

- Sōten Kōro as Yuan Shao (young)
- Birdy the Mighty Decode:02 as Masayuki Hazawa

2010

- Tantei Opera Milky Holmes as Mori Arty
- Chu-Bra!! as Kōta
- Hetalia: World Series as Hong Kong
- Stitch! ~Best Friends Forever~ as Heat

2011

- Hunter × Hunter (2011) as Sedokan
- Penguindrum as Souya

2012

- From the New World as Mamoru Itō (14 years old)
- Tantei Opera Milky Holmes Dai-Ni-Maku as Mori Arty
- Brave10 as Yuri Kamanosuke

2013

- Star Blazers 2199 as Tōru Hoshina
- Saint Seiya Omega as Rhea
- Hunter × Hunter (2011) as Cheetu
- Devils and Realist as Isaac Morton
- Mushibugyō as Yuri Kamanosuke

=== Drama CDs ===
- Aijin Incubus (Romio Aira)
- News Center no Koibito (Yuzuki Kojima)
- Yurigaoka Gakuen series 1: Heart mo Ace mo Boku no Mono (Jin Houjou)
- Yurigaoka Gakuen series 2: Kimidake no Prince ni Naritai (Jin Houjou)

=== Video games ===
- Mario (series) as Hammer Bro.
- Dragon Ball Xenoverse as Time Patroller (Male 3)
- Touken Ranbu as Mouri Toshirou
- Tales of the Tempest as Caius Qualls
- The Thousand Musketeers as Furusato

=== Tokusatsu ===
2017

- Uchu Sentai Kyuranger as Wunjet (ep. 36)
