= Space Battleship Yamato 2199: Odyssey of the Celestial Ark =

2014 Japanese film directed by Yutaka Izubuchi

- Cover art of the DVD release
- Directed by: Yutaka Izubuchi; Makoto Bessho
- Screenplay by: Yutaka Izubuchi
- Produced by: Mikio Gunji; Nobuhiko Fujisawa; Shinobu Suzuki
- Starring: Daisuke Ono; Eriko Nakamura; Aya Hisakawa; Masato Kokubun; Yuuya Chikaki; Junichi Suwabe; Ryuzaburo Otomo; Saki Fujita; Junko Iwao; Kouji Ishii; Masahiko Tanaka; Yuko Kaida; Shinnosuke Tachibana; Mie Sonozaki; Hiroki Touchi
- Music by: Hiroshi Miyagawa; Akira Miyagawa
- Production company: Xebec
- Distributed by: Shochiku
- Release date: 6 December 2014
- Running time: 111 minutes
- Country: Japan
- Language: Japanese
- Box office: ¥269 million

Space Battleship Yamato 2199: Odyssey of the Celestial Ark (宇宙戦艦ヤマト2199 星巡る方舟, Uchū Senkan Yamato 2199: Hoshi-Meguru Hakobune), also known as Star Blazers 2199: Odyssey of the Celestial Ark, is a 2014 film based on the Space Battleship Yamato 2199 anime series. The movie is set during the events of the series, primarily as the eponymous spaceship Yamato makes its way back to Earth after a long voyage to the planet Iscandar.

== Marketing ==
Prior to advertising of the home video release of the movie, writers had used the English translations Space Battleship Yamato 2199: Star-Voyaging Ark and Space Battleship Yamato 2199: Ark of the Stars. Home video packaging announced in April 2015 revealed Xebec's choice of Space Battleship Yamato 2199: Odyssey of the Celestial Ark as the official English title.

== Reception ==
The film grossed ¥68.8 million at the Japanese box office in its first week of release, and ¥269 million in total.

Writing for the Kotaku blog, reviewer Richard Eisenbeis generally praised the movie, particularly the debut of Gatlantis as a potent threat, the portrayal of the Garmillon characters, the focus on two Yamato crew members who had received only minimal attention in the Yamato 2199 series, and Kodai's growth as a leader. However, the reviewer was less impressed with what felt "more like the first arc of a new series" rather than a completely self-contained story.
