= Farewell to Space Battleship Yamato =

1978 film by Toshio Masuda, Leiji Matsumoto

- Film poster
- Directed by: Toshio Masuda; Leiji Matsumoto; Tomoharu Katsumata (Note: Credited as Animation Director (アニメーションディレクター).)
- Screenplay by: Keisuke Fujikawa; Eimei Yamamoto; Toshio Masuda
- Story by: Leiji Matsumoto; Aritsune Toyota (Note: Uncredited)
- Produced by: Tooru Yoshida
- Starring: Kei Tomiyama; Yoko Asagami; Shusei Nakamura
- Edited by: Yutaka Chikura
- Music by: Hiroshi Miyagawa
- Production company: Academy Productions (Note: The studio went through numerous name changes, which are listed as follows for the sake of consistency with other articles listing the studio: Animation Staff Room (1972–1973); Academy Productions (1973–1980); Tokyo Animation (1980–1982); and West Cape Corporation (1982–1997).)
- Distributed by: Toei Company
- Release date: July 14, 1978
- Running time: 151 minutes
- Country: Japan
- Language: Japanese
- Budget: ¥360 million
- Box office: ¥4.3 billion ($43 million)

Farewell to Space Battleship Yamato: Warriors of Love (Japanese: さらば宇宙戦艦ヤマト 愛の戦士たち, Hepburn: Saraba Uchū Senkan Yamato Ai no Senshitachi), also called Arrivederci Yamato, is the second film based on the classic manga and anime series Space Battleship Yamato (known as Star Blazers in the United States) and the sequel to Space Battleship Yamato (1977).

Set three years after the events of the first film, Yamato must protect Earth from another tyrannical alien race in the form of the White Comet Empire, who prove to be a much graver threat. This same storyline would be reused and expanded on later in the same year on TV in Space Battleship Yamato II, albeit with a different ending.

== Plot ==
Three years after their destructive war with Gamilas, humanity has largely recovered. Meanwhile in the distant reaches of space, the tyrannical White Comet Empire led by the Emperor Zordar sets its sights on Earth to conquer and enslave mankind. Dessler, leader of the Gamilas, is revived by them and pledges his loyalty. He vows revenge on the Yamato under the supervision of Comet Empire officer Miru.

Susumu Kodai and Yuki Mori, former crewmates of the Yamato, have become engaged. Kodai commands a destroyer in a cargo escort fleet. While returning to Earth from patrol, his ship receives a mysterious message. Upon his arrival, Kodai, along with the rest of Yamato's crew, commemorate the anniversary of her arrival at a statue of their late Captain Okita. Kodai and the crew believe that the world has become too complacent with their newfound peace, feeling that people have taken for granted Yamato's sacrifices. This feeling is further bolstered by the christening of the Earth Defense Force's newest state-of-the-art flagship Andromeda, which will succeed Yamato.

With the help of science officer Sanada, the message is analyzed. It warns of a looming threat. Sanada further explains that a comet has been seen rapidly approaching Earth. Kodai believes the two are connected. He tries to warn the EDF defense council but is dismissed. When Yamato's crew is informed that it will decommissioned, Kodai inspires them to mutiny and seek the source of the message themselves. Kodai urges Yuki to stay on Earth for her safety, but she secretly boards. Shima initially declines, balking at disobeying orders. A group of rowdy space marines commanded by Hajime Saito join them. Kodai helms the ship himself as they launch, but Shima reveals himself and takes his station. Upon reaching space, Yamato is joined by the Black Tiger squadron. Encountering a distress signal, the crew rescues Captain Ryu Hijikata from the wreckage of a patrol fleet that had just been attacked by Comet Empire forces. Yamato and her crew are welcomed back into EDF command, and Hijikata is assigned captain.

Yamato receives another message and learn the one contacting them is an alien named Tereza. She is held captive on her home planet Telezart by the Empire. Yamato warps there and fights her way to free Teresa. She explains that she is the sole survivor of her kind who had been wiped out by the Empire, and that the Comet itself conceals a base inside. Kodai pleads Teresa to join them but she cannot. She is made of anti-matter; any contact between her and real matter would cause a massive explosion. She vanishes and prays for Earth's victory.

Yamato departs Telezart but is ambushed by Dessler. Yamato takes the upper hand in the fight. As Yuki secretly follows him, Kodai infiltrates Dessler's ship and confronts the dictator. Kodai asks him why he continues to fight even after Gamilas's destruction. Dessler replies that it is to avenge the humiliation he suffered from Yamato. In the ensuing standoff Dessler nearly succumbs to his wounds, Yuki is shot by Miru while saving Kodai, and Dessler shoots Miru dead in response. Dessler realizes that his spirit was closer to Yamato's than the Empire's and asks Kodai for forgiveness. He divulges the Comet's weakness: the spiral core. He urges Kodai to defeat them, then voids himself into space.

As Yamato races back, the Empire begins its attack on Earth. The EDF fleet led by Andromeda easily fends off the first wave. Yamato reaches Earth in time to see the EDF fleet decimated. Yamato takes aim and fires at the Comet's spiral core with the Wave Motion Gun, seemingly destroying it. However, the massive base Gatlantis is revealed. Yamato advances but sustains grievous losses. Most of her crew including Dr. Sado, Analyzer, Captain Hijikata and Yuki are killed. A grief-stricken Kodai assumes command.

Kodai, joined by Sanada and the space marines, pilots a fighter and leads the Black Tigers to infiltrate Gatlantis. They fight their way to Gatlantis's core, where Sanada and Saito sacrifice themselves to destroy it while Kodai escapes. Kodai orders Yamato to open fire on Gatlantis. The alien base cracks open, revealing a massive battleship hidden inside that dwarfs Yamato. Zordar boasts at Kodai, declaring himself the ruler of the universe. Crippled beyond repair and hopelessly outmatched, Kodai confers with the spirit of Captain Okita, who advises Kodai that he has one last weapon to fight with: his life.

Kodai orders the surviving crewmen to leave the ship. Shima and the others realize his intentions and protest but Kodai convinces them, stating that by sacrificing himself, he will not truly die as Earth will live. The crew disembarks and salutes as he steers Yamato into a collision course with Zordar's battleship. Teresa appears before Kodai and is inspired to sacrifice herself as well, amplifying Yamato with her anti-matter body. Kodai sees himself surrounded by the spirits of his crew, including Yuki. Yamato vanishes in a bright flash.

== Voice cast ==
- Kei Tomiyama as Susumu Kodai
- Youko Asagami as Yuki Mori
- Akira Kamiya as Saburou Katou
- Akira Kimura as Captain Hijikata Ryu
- Bin Shimada as Aide
- Chikao Ohtsuka as Balzey
- Eiji Shima as Pilot
- Eken Mine as Politician A
- Goro Naya as Jūzō Okita
- Shusei Nakamura as Daisuke Shima
- Ichirô Murakoshi as Goenitz / Politician B
- Ichirô Nagai as Hikozaemon Tokugawa / Sakezou Sado
- Isao Sasaki as Hajime Saito
- Kazue Komiya as Sabera
- Kazuo Hayashi as Yasuo Nanbu
- Kazuyuki Sogabe as Akira Yamamoto / Larzeler
- Kenichi Ogata as Announcer
- Kouji Yada as Science Director / Taran
- Kousei Tomita as Zavival
- Mahito Tsujimura as Andromeda Captain / Staff Officer
- Masato Ibu as Desler / Heikurou Todo
- Michihiro Ikemizu as Underling
- Miyuki Ueda as Teresa
- Osamu Ichikawa as Miru
- Osamu Kobayashi as Zordar
- Osamu Saka as Gorrand Staff Official / President
- Shinji Nomura as Yoshikazu Aihara
- Taichirou Hirokawa as Narrator
- Takeshi Aono as Shirou Sanada
- Tetsuya Kaji as Earth Commander in Chief
- Yoshito Yasuhara as Kenjirou Oota / Politician C

== Production ==
In 1977 the first film of the series, Space Battleship Yamato, outperformed Star Wars at the Japanese box office. This led to the production of Farewell to Space Battleship Yamato, which was released in 1978. It was originally intended to conclude the story, but a third film, Be Forever Yamato, was released two years later. Total 1,200 staff, Total 2300 Cuts, 65,000 sheets. Farewell to Space Battleship Yamato had a total budget of ¥510 million ($5.1 million), including ¥360 million ($3.6 million) for production and ¥150 million ($1.5 million) for advertising. it grossed approximately ¥4.3 billion, underlining its box office success.

Produced by Tooru Yoshida, with screenplay by Keisuke Fujikawa, Eiichi Yamamoto, and Toshio Masuda, based on a story by Leiji Matsumoto (with an uncredited contribution by Aritsune Toyota).
