= Yamato: The New Voyage =

1979 television film directed by Leiji Matsumoto

- Poster
- Created by: Leiji Matsumoto; Yoshinobu Nishizaki
- Screenplay by: Eimei Yamamoto
- Story by: Leiji Matsumoto
- Directed by: Yoshinobu Nishizaki (Note: Credited as Chief Director (総監督).); Takeshi Shirato (Note: Credited as Chief director (チーフディレクター).); Toshio Masuda
- Starring: Kei Tomiyama; Yoko Asagami; Shusei Nakamura
- Music by: Hiroshi Miyagawa
- Country of origin: Japan
- Original language: Japanese

Production
- Executive producer: Yoshinobu Nishizaki
- Running time: 95 minutes
- Production company: Academy Productions (Note: The studio went through numerous name changes, which are listed as follows for the sake of consistency with other articles listing the studio: Animation Staff Room (1972–1973); Academy Productions (1973–1980); Tokyo Animation (1980–1982); and West Cape Corporation (1982–1997).)

Original release
- Release: July 14, 1979

Yamato: The New Voyage (Japanese: 宇宙戦艦ヤマト 新たなる旅立ち, Hepburn: Uchū Senkan Yamato Aratanaru Tabidachi; lit. "Space Battleship Yamato: The New Journey"), also known as Bon Voyage Yamato, is a 1979 Japanese animated television movie that was first broadcast on Fuji TV. This was the third movie in the Space Battleship Yamato saga (however, Be Forever Yamato is the third theatrical movie) and the sequel to Space Battleship Yamato II. The Yamato crew must defeat the new Dark Nebula Empire. This film is the first in a two-part story arc that continues in Be Forever Yamato. It later got a remake in 2021 and 2022 as the two-part movie Space Battleship Yamato 2205.

== Plot ==
During a seemingly standard training mission a month after the war with the White Comet Empire, the crew of the Yamato face a new enemy: the mysterious Dark Nebula Empire. Kodai, Shima, Yuki, and the rest of the ship's crew have to ally with their former enemy turned ally Desslar in order to foil the evil Dark Nebula's plans of strip mining Iscandar, the home planet of old friend Queen Starsha, who helped the crew during their first voyage.

== Cast ==
- Kei Tomiyama as Susumu Kodai
- Shusei Nakamura as Daisuke Shima
- Yoko Asagami as Yuki Mori
- Akira Kimura as Great Emperor / Narrator
- Ichirô Nagai as Dr. Sakezo Sado
- Kazuo Hayashi as Yasuo Nanbu
- Kenichi Ogata as Analyzer
- Koji Nakata as Meldarz - [the film's main antagonist]
- Kouji Yada as Talan
- Kousei Tomita as Deda
- Makio Inoue as Tetsu Kitano
- Masatō Ibu as Desler/ Heikuro Todo
- Michiko Hirai as Starsha
- Mikio Terashima as Sho Yamazaki
- Miyuki Ueda as Starsha
- Shinji Nomura as Yoshikazu Aihara
- Taichirou Hirokawa as Mamoru Kodai
- Takeshi Aono as Shiro Sanada
- Tohru Furuya as Tasuke Tokugawa
- Toshio Furukawa as Shigeru Samamoto
- Yoshito Yasuhara as Kenjiro Ota
- Yū Mizushima as Jiro Shima (scenes deleted)
