= Be Forever Yamato =

1980 film by Leiji Matsumoto, Toshio Masuda

- Film poster
- Directed by: Tomoharu Katsumata (chief); Toshio Masuda; Leiji Matsumoto
- Screenplay by: Toshio Masuda; Keisuke Fujikawa; Eimei Yamamoto
- Story by: Leiji Matsumoto
- Produced by: Tooru Yoshida
- Starring: Kei Tomiyama; Yoko Asagami; Shusei Nakamura
- Edited by: Yutaka Chikura
- Music by: Hiroshi Miyagawa
- Production company: Tokyo Dōga (Note: The studio went through numerous name changes, which are listed as follows for the sake of consistency with other articles listing the studio: Animation Staff Room (1972–1973); Academy Productions (1973–1980); Tokyo Dōga (1980–1982); and West Cape Corporation (1982–1997).)
- Distributed by: Toei Company
- Release date: August 2, 1980
- Running time: 148 minutes
- Country: Japan
- Language: Japanese
- Box office: ¥2.5 billion

Be Forever Yamato (Japanese: ヤマトよ永遠に, Hepburn: Yamato yo Towa ni) is a 1980 Japanese science fiction anime film and the fourth film (third theatrical) based on the classic anime series Space Battleship Yamato (known as Star Blazers in the United States). The film is unique for switching from monaural VistaVision (1.85:1) to Quadraphonic CinemaScope (2.35:1) when the Yamato enters the Double Galaxy. The film was remade as the 2024–2026 series Be Forever Yamato: Rebel 3199.

== Plot ==
The Black Nebula Empire, last seen in Yamato: The New Voyage, lands a huge fortress on Earth and sends out an invasion force, while the Black Nebulan fleet wipes out Earth's space fleets. The Black Nebulans then announce that their fortress contains a bomb that can destroy all life on Earth and threaten to detonate it, forcing the Earth military to surrender. Meanwhile, Kodai and the rest of the Yamato crew discover that the Yamato has been secretly rebuilt and sets sail towards the Black Nebula to attack their home planet. However, Yuki is accidentally left behind and captured by Black Nebula intelligence officer Aphon, who grows infatuated with Yuki and tries to seduce her. However, after he realizes Yuki still believes Kodai is alive and will never reciprocate his feelings, Alphon lets Yuki go and she joins the human resistance forces.

The Yamato reaches the other side of the Black Nebula and finds a planet that heavily resembles Earth. Upon landing, they are greeted by Lord Scaldart, the leader of the Black Nebula Empire. He explains that the planet they are on is actually Earth 200 years in the future, and they sent their forces back in time to conquer Earth. He also shows the Yamato crew the history of Yamato from 2202 to 2402, culminating in the ship eventually being destroyed by Black Nebula fleet. Scaldart warns the Yamato crew that they cannot return to their own time otherwise they will meet their fated end, and offers to let them stay on the future Earth. The crew refuse Scaldart's offer and return to the Yamato. However, Sasha decides to stay behind, believing that she has a role to play as a human and Iscandarian hybrid.

As the Yamato leaves the planet, Scaldart orders his fleet to attack them. The crew is initially confused why the Black Nebulans would attack them if their fate is already decided, until Sanada deduces that the future Earth they saw was actually an elaborate ploy by Scaldart to trick the Yamato into surrendering. Realizing that the Black Nebulans aren't bluffing about their willingness to destroy Earth, they turn back to look for the bomb's control system. They decide to attack the false Earth with the Wave Motion Gun, which destroys its facade and reveals its true nature as the planet Dezarium. Sasha then contacts the crew and informs them that she can open a vent to allow the Yamato to attack Dezarium's core directly with the Wave Motion Gun, which will destroy the entire planet, but Scaldart threatens to detonate the bomb on Earth.

Back on Earth, Yuki leads the resistance into attacking the bomb. She encounters Alphon, and they both are reluctant to fight each other until another soldier mortally wounds Alphon. Yuki is shocked that Alphon has a robot body, and he admits the Black Nebulans are actually all cyborgs who lost their original bodies due to overdependence on automation, and invaded Earth with the intention of taking humans' bodies for themselves. With his dying breath, Alphon tells Yuki how to disarm the bomb, with both the trigger mechanism on the bomb itself and the control system on Dezarium needing to be disabled together. Yuki successfully disables the trigger right when Sasha sabotages the control system. The Yamato then charges into Dezarium's core, but the bridge takes a direct hit and Captain Yamanami is mortally wounded, designating Kodai as the new captain before dying. Kodai takes charges of the Wave Motion Gun, but hesitates since Sasha is still on the planet. Sasha urges Kodai to fire before she is killed by Scaldart, which finally pushes Kodai to fire the Wave Motion Gun, destroying Dezarium.

As the Yamato sets course back to Earth, they are contacted by Sasha's spirit, who bids the crew to continue protecting Earth as she ascends to the afterlife. The Yamato then returns to Earth, where Kodai and Yuki are finally reunited.

== Cast ==
- Kei Tomiyama as Susumu Kodai
- Shuusei Nakamura as Daisuke Shima
- Youko Asagami as Yuki Mori
- Akira Kamiya as Shiro Kato
- Banjou Ginga as Grotas
- Ichirô Nagai as Dr. Sakezo Sado
- Kazuo Hayashi as Yasuo Nanbu
- Keiko Han as Sasha(as the daughter of Mamoru Kodai and Starsha)/Mio Sanada(as the member of the family of Shiro Sanada)
- Kenichi Ogata as Analyzer
- Masatō Ibu as Heikuro Todo
- Michio Hazama as Narrator
- Mikio Terashima as Sho Yamazaki
- Miyuki Ueda as Starsha
- Mugihito as Kazan
- Nachi Nozawa as Alphon
- Osamu Kobayashi as Osamu Yamanami
- Shinji Nomura as Yoshikazu Aihara
- Taichirou Hirokawa as Mamoru Kodai
- Takeshi Aono as Shiro Sanada
- Tohru Furuya as Tasuke Tokugawa
- Tōru Ōhira as Skulldart
- Yoshito Yasuhara as Kenjiro Ota
- Yumi Nakatani as Sada

== Production ==
This movie was intended to be Space Battleship Yamato III. According to Yoshinobu Nishizaki, the purpose of creating a third Yamato was for the younger generation: "However, there are themes to be expressed and a lot of people hope to see it again, so I think Yamato should make another appearance. It is not only for the people who watched from the beginning, nor is it for my sake. It is also for the young generation that wants to know Yamato anew."

Nishizaki and Leiji Matsumoto, writer of the previous films, met on October 23, 1979, to discuss their goals and vision for the new film. After this, Matsumoto began developing the ideas into a story synopsis. His 'B' draft was completed on December 31, 1979, and the line 'Be Forever Yamato' appeared at the end of the script. At this point, it was not intended to be the title of the film. The overall plot beats and concepts of this draft were kept mostly intact in the final version, but the dialogue was changed.

Inspiration for the film was taken from The Black Hole and Star Trek: The Motion Picture. The film was initially meant to be shot in 70mm, but this would be scaled back due to time constraints. However, the film made use of other revolutionary techniques for an anime film. These included scanimation and animating part of the film in the Cinemascope aspect ratio. Storyboarding and scriptwriting for the film progressed in tandem; the actual script would only be completed in April 1980, four months before the target release date of the film (August). Messages from staff members working on the film were published in the Yamato Fan Club Magazine, issue #15. These included a message from Leiji Matsumoto, Hiroshi Miyagawa, the composer, and Toshio Masuda, the director.

Notably, Be Forever Yamato includes a shift from VistaVision size to Cinemascope in one of the scenes, as well as a change to stero sound. Nishizaki's aim with this was to capture the depth of outer space; however, only a few theatres throughout Japan could show it due to technical limitations.

== Reception ==
Helen McCarthy in 500 Essential Anime Movies called it a "flawed masterpiece" and stated that "this movie is epic in every way. But its length is a problem - the ending is rushed and there are some plot holes that another half hour or so could have plugged".
