= Final Yamato =

1983 film by Tomoharu Katsumata

- Film poster
- Directed by: Takeshi Shirato (chief); Tomoharu Katsumata; Yoshinobu Nishizaki
- Screenplay by: Kazuo Kasahara; Toshio Masuda; Yoshinobu Nishizaki; Eiichi Yamamoto; Eimei Yamamoto
- Story by: Eiichi Yamamoto
- Starring: Kei Tomiyama; Yoko Asagami; Goro Naya
- Music by: Kentarō Haneda; Hiroshi Miyagawa
- Production company: West Cape Corporation (Note: The studio went through numerous name changes, which are listed as follows for the sake of consistency with other articles listing the studio: Animation Staff Room (1972–1973); Academy Productions (1973–1980); Tokyo Animation (1980–1982); and West Cape Corporation (1982–1997).)
- Distributed by: Toei Company
- Release dates: March 19, 1983 (35mm); November 5, 1983 (70mm); August 10, 1985 (Special Edition)
- Running time: 152 minutes (35mm); 163 minutes (70mm)
- Country: Japan
- Language: Japanese
- Box office: ¥1.72 billion

Final Yamato (Japanese: 宇宙戦艦ヤマト・完結編, Hepburn: Uchuu Senkan Yamato Kanketsu Hen; lit. "Space Battleship Yamato: Final Saga") is a 1983 Japanese animated science fiction film and the fifth film (fourth theatrical) of the Space Battleship Yamato saga (known as Star Blazers in the United States). Its extended 70mm cut was the longest theatrical animated film in the world for 36 years, until it was surpassed by In This Corner (and Other Corners) of the World, the 2019 extended cut of 2016's In This Corner of the World, by five minutes.

== Synopsis ==
The water planet Aquarius is heading towards Earth after flooding the home planet of the warrior race of the Dinguil. The Dinguil use warp technology to make the planet move towards Earth faster than usual. The warrior race plans to flood Earth and make it their new home. When humans learns of this, they make plans to evacuate Earth. Unfortunately, the Dinguil destroy the evacuation fleets. The space battleship Yamato, under the newly revived Jyuzo Okita (who seemingly died in the first season of the original series) now has to fight the Dinguil and stop Aquarius from flooding Earth.

== Cast ==
- Kei Tomiyama as Susumu Kodai
- Yoko Asagami as Yuki Mori
- Goro Naya as Juzo Okita
- Chika Sakamoto as Jiro Shima
- Akira Kamiya as Shiro Kato
- Ichiro Nagai as Dr. Sakezo Sado
- Isao Sasaki as Daisuke Shima
- Jun Hazumi as EDF Officer
- Kazue Ikura as Dingir Boy
- Kazuo Hayashi as Yasuo Nanbu
- Kenichi Ogata as Analyzer
- Koji Yada as Talan
- Masane Tsukayama as Lugal II
- Masato Ibu as Desler / Heikuro Todo
- Mikio Terashima as Sho Yamazaki
- Osamu Kobayashi as Captain Mizutani
- Reiko Tajima as Queen of Aquarius
- Rokuro Naya as Dingir Officer
- Shinji Nomura as Giichi Aihara
- Takeshi Aono as Shiro Sanada
- Taro Ishida as Lugal I
- Toru Furuya as Tasuke Tokugawa
- Yoshito Yasuhara as Kenjiro Ota
- Tatsuya Nakadai as Narrator

== Reception ==
The film made ¥1.72 billion at the Japanese box office.

== Alternate endings ==
There are three alternate endings that were included in the theatrical and home video releases.
