= Space Battleship Yamato (1977 film) =

1977 film by Toshio Masuda

- Japanese theatrical release poster
- Directed by: Toshio Masuda; Noboru Ishiguro (Note: Credited as Animation Director (アニメーションディレクター).)
- Screenplay by: Keisuke Fujikawa; Eiichi Yamamoto; Maru Tamura
- Story by: Yoshinobu Nishizaki
- Starring: Kei Tomiyama; Yoko Asagami; Shusei Nakamura
- Edited by: Yoshihisa Tsurubuchi
- Music by: Hiroshi Miyagawa
- Production company: Academy Productions (Note: The studio went through numerous name changes, which are listed as follows for the sake of consistency with other articles listing the studio: Animation Staff Room (1972–1973); Academy Productions (1973–1980); Tokyo Animation (1980–1982); and West Cape Corporation (1982–1997).)
- Distributed by: Toei Company
- Release date: August 6, 1977
- Running time: 145 minutes
- Country: Japan
- Language: Japanese
- Budget: ¥200 million ($745,000)
- Box office: ¥2.1 billion ($23 million)

Space Battleship Yamato: The Movie (Japanese: 宇宙戦艦ヤマト 劇場版, Hepburn: Uchū Senkan Yamato: Gekijōban) is a 1977 Japanese anime film directed by Toshio Masuda and Noboru Ishiguro. The film consists of various television episodes edited from the "Iscandar" arc of the 1974 Space Battleship Yamato television series. It originally had a new ending created for the theatrical release. In English-speaking countries, it was known by the title Space Cruiser.

== Plot ==
In the distant future, the war between the human race and the aliens known as the Gamilons has destroyed the Earth. Radioactive asteroids have devastated the planet, making its atmosphere uninhabitable. In an effort to assist the Earth, Queen Starsha of the planet Iscandar offers the Earth Forces a device that can completely neutralize the radiation.

In order to get this device, the Space Battleship Yamato is launched from the remains of its World War II ancestor on a 148,000 light-year journey. The crew of the Space Battleship Yamato has only one Earth year to travel to Iscandar and back, or the human race will become extinct.

It originally had a new ending created for the theatrical release in which Starsha had died before the Yamato reaching Iscandar.

== Cast ==
| Character | Original | English |
|---|---|---|
| Jūzō Okita | Gorō Naya | Marvin Miller |
| Aruga Kōsaku | Gorō Naya | Unknown |
| Susumu Kodai | Kei Tomiyama | Rex Knowles |
| Shima Daisuke | Shūsei Nakamura | Paul Shively |
| Mori Yuki | Yōko Asagami | Marcy Goldman |
| Dr. Sado Sakezō | Ichirō Nagai | Unknown |
| Tokugawa Hikozaemon | Ichirō Nagai | Unknown |
| Mamoru Kodai | Taichirō Hirokawa | Unknown |
| Sanada Shirō | Takeshi Aono | Jerry Harland |
| Desler | Masatō Ibu | Unknown |
| Tōdō Heikurō | Masatō Ibu | Unknown |
| Domel | Osamu Kobayashi | Dudley Coleman |
| Starsha | Michiko Hirai | Marcy Goldman |
| Katō Saburō | Akira Kamiya | Unknown |
| Analyzer | Kenichi Ogata | Unknown |
| Yabu Sukeharu | Kenichi Ogata | Unknown |
| Hiss | Keisuke Yamashita | Jerry Harland |
| Sugiyama Kazuhiko | Keisuke Yamashita | Unknown |
| Jirō Nōmura | Keisuke Yamashita | Unknown |
| Schultz | Takeshi Ōbayashi | Unknown |
| Narration | Akira Kimura | Marvin Miller |

== Production ==
The film had a production budget of ¥200 million or $745,000 (equivalent to $6,900,000 in 2025), surpassing Isao Takahata's The Great Adventure of Horus, Prince of the Sun (1968) to become the most expensive anime film up until then. In turn, its production budget record was broken two years later by Hayao Miyazaki's Lupin III film Castle of Cagliostro (1979).

== Box office ==
The film was a commercial success in Japan, drawing an audience of 2.3 million viewers at the box office, and grossing ¥2.1 billion or $23,000,000 (equivalent to $122,000,000 in 2025).

== Reception ==
In contemporary reviews, Variety declared the film as "with a few exceptions, strictly Saturday morning tv fare" that "should bore adults silly and, owing to jargon saturated dialog, confuse the six-to-12-year-old audience that might have appreciated it." The review commented on the animation, describing it as "flat, static, often poorly- synched and divided into segments for easy commercial insertion."

The Monthly Film Bulletin stated that despite being "executed with considerable flair for piling disaster on ever more improbable disaster [the film] is mainly of interest as a cartoon that succeeds in capitalising on both Jaws and Star Wars, as well as conjuring memories of both Japanese glory and defeat in the Second War." The review concluded that the film "is so perfunctorily cobbled together and, on the whole, so indifferently animated [...] that expectations are almost immediately dashed."

== Bibliography ==
- Willis, Donald, ed. (1985). Variety's Complete Science Fiction Reviews. Garland Publishing Inc. ISBN 978-0-8240-6263-7.
