= Space Yamato =

Space Yamato is a group of Japanese anime television series, including:

- Space Battleship Yamato
- Space Battleship Yamato II
- Space Battleship Yamato III
- Space Battleship Yamato 2199
