= Space Battleship Yamato: Harukanaru Hoshi Iscandar =

1999 video game

Space Battleship Yamato
- Developer: Bandai
- Publisher: Bandai
- Platform: PlayStation
- Release: JP: February 4, 1999
- Genre: Action
- Modes: Single-player, Multiplayer

Space Battleship Yamato (宇宙戦艦ヤマト 遥かなる星イスカンダル, Uchū Senkan Yamato Harukanaru Hoshi Iscandar; Space Battleship Yamato: The Distant Planet Iscandar) this is the first game in the Leiji Matsumoto's PS1 trilogy of Space Battleship Yamato games.

== Plot ==
The basic plot is more or less the same as in the original Space Battleship Yamato and Star Blazers, with Earth being rendered barren by Gamilan planet bombs. However, certain characters (Sukeji Yabu and Talan) do not appear

== Reception ==
On release, Famitsu magazine scored the game a 33 out of 40.
