= Star Blazers =

Animated television series

- Based on: Space Battleship Yamato (1974–1980)
- Starring: Kenneth Meseroll; Amy Howard Wilson; Eddie Allen; Lydia Leeds; Gordon Ramsey; Tom Tweedy; Mike Czechopoulos; Michael Bertolini; Chris Latta; Jack Grimes; Corinne Orr; Dylan Ross
- Countries of origin: United States; Japan (o.v.)
- Original language: English
- No. of seasons: 3
- No. of episodes: 77 (list of episodes)

Production
- Animator: Academy Productions
- Production companies: Claster Television; Sunwagon Productions

Original release
- Network: First-run syndication
- Release: September 17, 1979 – December 4, 1984

Star Blazers is an American adaptation of the Japanese anime television series Space Battleship Yamato I (1974), II (1978), and III (1980) (宇宙戦艦ヤマト, Uchū Senkan Yamato). Star Blazers was first broadcast in the United States in 1979. It was the first popular English-translated anime that had an overarching plot and storyline that required the episodes to be viewed in order, which paved the way for future arc-based, plot-driven anime translations. It also dealt with somewhat more mature themes than other productions aimed at the same target audience at the time.

== Plot ==
Star Blazers consists of three television seasons. Each is an English-language adaptation of its Japanese counterpart Space Battleship Yamato. However, the Japanese saga entails more than just these three television seasons, and part of this missing portion of the saga occurs between Seasons Two and Three, in the movies Yamato: The New Voyage and Be Forever Yamato.

In the first season, Earth is attacked by Gamilon, a distant planet. The radiation from Gamilon's planet bombs forces everyone on Earth underground. With no way to remove the radiation, all life on Earth will be wiped out in one year. The Earth then receives unexpected help from Queen Starsha of the planet Iscandar, who offers a device called "Cosmo DNA" which will remove the radiation. However, since Iscandar is 148,000 light years away, Starsha also sends plans for the experimental Wave Motion Engine that, when constructed, will help whoever can travel to Iscandar by letting them travel at 27,569,736,000 miles per second (about 150,000 times the speed of light, permitting the journey to be made in one year). On Earth, a crew is recruited, headed by Captain Avatar, and an old sunken battleship (the World War II–era Japanese battleship Yamato) is transformed into a spaceship—renamed the Argo—outfitted with the Wave Motion Engine, and sent to Iscandar.

The second season takes place one year after the Argo returns to Earth with the Cosmo DNA and Earth's ecosystem is restored. It now faces a new, dangerous enemy, the Comet Empire, led by Prince Zordar. Unlike Gamilon, which was seeking to capture and colonize Earth, Zordar simply wants to conquer and annex Earth to his Empire. Desslok, the Gamilon leader, also joins forces with Zordar, mainly because he wants revenge on the Argo for having destroyed Gamilon. The series revolves around the Argo, now commanded by Deputy Captain Derek Wildstar, working with the Earth Defense Force to face Zordar.

In the third season, the Argo is caught in the middle of a war between the Galmans (the reformed Gamilon Empire) and the Bolar Federation. A stray missile fired during the war causes the sun's thermonuclear reactions to go out of control. Unless it can be stopped, the sun will destroy the Earth in one year and the entire solar system in three. Now officially in command of the Argo, Derek Wildstar is charged to help find a new home for Earth's population.

== Episodes ==
Season	Episodes	Originally released	
Season	Episodes	First released	Last released
1	26	September 17, 1979	March 3, 1980
2	26	September 13, 1980	March 7, 1981
3	25	1984	December 4, 1984

== Characters ==
=== First and second seasons ===
Major characters appearing in Seasons One and Two are listed below by their canonical (Westchester) names:

Character	Performer	Position	Origin
Captain Avatar	Gordon Ramsey	Captain of the Argo and Star Force Commander	Earth
Derek Wildstar	Kenneth Meseroll	Deputy Captain, Argo (season 1); Acting Captain and Star Force Commander (season 2)	Earth
Mark Venture	Tom Tweedy	Chief Navigator, Argo	Earth
Nova Forrester	Amy Howard Wilson	Radar Operator, Nurse, Argo	Earth
Sandor	Unknown	Science Officer, Argo	Earth
Homer	Michael Bertolini	Communications Chief, Argo	Earth
Eager	Patrick W. Lohn	Assistant Navigator, Argo	Earth
Dash	Eddie Allen	Artillery Unit, Argo	Earth
Orion	Gordon Ramsey	Chief Engineer, Argo	Earth
Conroy	Unknown	Black Tiger Leader	Earth
Hardy	Unknown	Black Tiger Pilot	Earth
Dr. Sane	Frank Pita	Doctor, Argo	Earth
IQ-9	Stephen James Pastor	Survey Robot, Argo	Earth
Sgt. Knox	Chris Latta	Space Marine Leader, Brumus	Earth
Captain Gideon	Unknown	Captain of Andromeda	Earth
Commander Singleton	Unknown	Commander, Earth Defense Force	Earth
Stone	Michael Bertolini	General, EDF	Earth
Miss Efficiency	Unknown	Medical Robot, EDF	Earth
Alex Wildstar	Unknown	Brother of Derek, EDF	Earth
Queen Starsha	Lydia Leeds	Ruler of Iscandar	Iscandar
Astra	No vocals	Sister of Starsha	Iscandar
Leader Desslok	Eddie Allen	Gamilon Leader	Gamilon
General Krypt	Unknown	Adjutant to Desslok	Gamilon
General Talan	Unknown	Adjutant to Desslok	Gamilon
General Lysis	Unknown	Commander of Balan Base	Gamilon
Volgar	Mike Czechopoulos	Adjutant to Lysis	Gamilon
Colonel Ganz	Unknown	Commander of Pluto Base	Gamilon
Major Bane	Unknown	Adjutant to Ganz	Gamilon
Prince Zordar	Unknown	Ruler of Comet Empire	Comet Empire
Princess Invidia	Morgan Lofting	Daughter of Zordar	Comet Empire
General Dire	Chris Latta	Imperial Command Staff	Comet Empire
General Gorse	Frank Pita	Imperial Command Staff	Comet Empire
General Turpis	Unknown	Combined Fleet Commander (script writers mistakenly turned Valsey into two characters)	Comet Empire
General Bleek	Chris Latta	Combined Fleet Commander (script writers mistakenly turned Valsey into two characters)	Comet Empire
General Torback	Unknown	Antimatter Missile Fleet Commander	Comet Empire
General Naska	Unknown	Advance Attack Unit Commander	Comet Empire
General Scorch	Unknown	Tank Battalion Commander	Comet Empire
Morta	Unknown	Advisor to Desslok	Comet Empire
Mazor	Unknown	Bomber Pilot	Comet Empire
Trelaina	Lydia Leeds	Sole survivor on Telezart	Telezart

=== Third season ===
Major characters appearing in Season Three are as follows:

Character	Performer	Position	Origin
Derek Wildstar	John Belucci	Captain, Argo	Earth
Mark Venture	Peter Fernandez	Chief Navigator, Argo	Earth
Nova Forrester	Corinne Orr	Radar Operator, Argo	Earth
Sandor	Unknown	Science Officer, Argo	Earth
Homer Glitchman (Note: Homer's last name, Glitchman, was added by Westchester for the third season. No last name was used in previous seasons.)	Unknown	Communications Chief, Argo	Earth
Eager	Unknown	Assistant Navigator, Argo	Earth
Lt. Dash	Unknown	Artillery Unit, Argo	Earth
Orion	Unknown	New Chief Engineer, Argo	Earth
Cory Conroy (Note: Cory is actually the younger brother of the Conroy from Seasons 1 and 2. That Conroy was never given a first name and was killed during the battle with the Comet Empire near Earth. Since this was not revealed in Star Blazers, the audience is allowed to assume that the two brothers are one and the same.)	Unknown	Black Tiger Leader	Earth
Dr. Sane	Unknown	Doctor, Argo	Earth
IQ-9	Unknown	Survey Robot, Argo	Earth
Jason Jetter	Lionel Wilson	Recruit Dish-Washer, Argo	Earth
Flash Contrail	Unknown	Recruit Pilot, Argo	Earth
Commander	Unknown	Commander, Earth Defense Force	Earth
Leader Desslok	Unknown	Galman Emperor	Galman
Sgt. Masterson (Talan)	Unknown	Adjutant to Desslok	Galman
Admiral Keeling	Unknown	Head of Staff	Galman
Admiral Smeerdom	Unknown	Commander of Eastern Task Force	Galman
Admiral Smellen	Unknown	Commander of Western Task Force	Galman
Admiral Gustaf	Jack Grimes	Commander of 3rd Local Fleet	Galman
General Dagon	Unknown	Commander of Carrier Fleet	Galman
Luchner von Feral	Unknown	Subspace Submarine Pack Commander	Galman
Major Cranshaw	Unknown	Technology Major	Galman
Bemlayze	Unknown	Bolar Prime Minister	Bolar Federation
Golsakof	Unknown	Adjutant to Bemlayze	Bolar Federation
Brozof	Unknown	Governor of Planet Berth	Bolar Federation
Ram	Unknown	Captain of Legendra	Bolar Federation
Queen Mariposa	Corinne Orr	Exiled Ruler of Guardiana	Guardiana
Queen Guardiana	Unknown	Goddess of Guardiana	Guardiana

== Production and release ==
In 1977, before the debut of the American Star Blazers series, the Japanese anime film Space Battleship Yamato (or Space Cruiser Yamato as it was known at the time) was dubbed into English and retitled Space Cruiser. This film was sold and released in several countries, including the United States, Britain and France. The American release was extremely limited, and eventually ended up airing on television in the Los Angeles area in 1978.

Following this, the Westchester Corporation identified the first Space Battleship Yamato anime series from 1974 as a potential "kids' property" and bought the rights to the first two seasons (season three had not been made yet). Dubbing and editing were done by Griffin-Bacal Advertising and production and syndication was handled by Claster Television. The Japanese language elements such as series title and scene captions were replaced or removed. New opening credit rolls were created featuring the "Star Blazers" logo. The series premiered in the San Francisco Bay Area on September 17, 1979, as part of the weekday show Captain Cosmic on KTVU 2. Star Blazers initial broadcasts received high ratings, and subsequent rebroadcasts contributed to the development of anime fandom in northern California.

Being marketed to a school-age audience, this animated space opera was bowdlerized by American editors in order to satisfy the broadcast standards and practices offices of American television stations. However, far fewer edits were made than were made to the episodes of another 1970s anime series, Battle of the Planets (an edited version of Science Ninja Team Gatchaman). Even in its edited American form Star Blazers retains practically all of its uniquely Japanese characteristics in terms of content, plot, character development, and philosophy.

Principal changes in the transformation to Star Blazers included westernization of character names, reduction of personal violence, toning down of offensive language and alcohol use (references to sake were changed to "spring water", and the Doctor's perpetually drunken state was portrayed as merely good humor), removal of sexual fan service, and reduction of references to World War II (though the sunken battleship ruins were still identified as the battleship Yamato in dialogue). The most significant reference removed—and the longest single edit in the series—was a section from episode two depicting the Battleship Yamato's final battle during World War II, including imagery of the captain tied to the helm as he went down with his ship.

Many fans regard Star Blazers as more "adult" than other cartoons shown in the United States at the time, as personal tragedy, funeral scenes for fallen comrades, and the extinction faced by humanity were left intact. The very Japanese theme of "the honorable enemy" was also a tremendously important aspect of character development; in particular, the major villain of the first series, Desslok, during the second and third seasons, as well as in the later movies.

The most significant change made by Griffin-Bacal was purely narrative: In the original series, the Yamato and its crew were regarded as a single entity, the narrator each week urging "Yamato, hurry to Iscandar!". In English, the significance of the name Yamato as a word the viewers would identify with, signifying the land, people, and spirit of Japan, is lost, so in Star Blazers the crew were named the Star Force and became the focus of the series. The ship is still the historical Yamato and it is referred to as such in early episodes (although the ship's backstory is edited out), but it is renamed the Argo (after the ship Argo of Jason and the Argonauts); the crew keep calling "it" (not "her") Star Force and the ship becomes merely the vessel in which they travel.

The first two seasons (The Quest for Iscandar and The Comet Empire) were broadcast in 1979 and 1980. By the time the third season of Yamato was released, the American production company could not reach the original voice actors. The third season (released as The Bolar Wars) played to a small test market and was not as widely seen until its release on video and DVD. It remains less popular than the first two seasons. Many of the original English voice actors have since been tracked down and interviewed for the more recent Star Blazers DVD releases.

The American dub version of Star Blazers series one and two aired in 1983 in Australia on the ABC National Television network. The series aired Monday through Friday at 5 pm.

== Reception ==
Christopher John reviewed Starblazers in Ares Magazine #8 and commented that "Starblazers is well worth more than one viewing, even if it is run at 6:30 in the morning. It may be the only chance you'll have to see a beautiful and exciting work of art."

== Remake ==
After four years of planning, a 26-episode animated remake of the 1974 story arc, Star Blazers: Space Battleship Yamato 2199 (Uchū Senkan Yamato 2199), debuted in Japan on April 7, 2012. The series began release in North America on limited-edition DVDs and Blu-rays via Voyager Entertainment USA and Bandai Visual on February 27, 2014, under the title Star Blazers 2199 in Japanese language with English Subtitles (created by Bang Zoom! Entertainment). The strong Japanese popularity of this remake, directed by Yutaka Izubuchi, has led to the production of an all-new animated feature film (set within the year 2199, during the return voyage to Earth), wherein our heroes encounter an advance fleet of the Comet Empire. Space Battleship Yamato 2199: Ark of the Stars (Uchū Senkan Yamato 2199: Hoshi-Meguru Hakobune) opened nationwide in Japan on December 6, 2014. A full series remake of the Comet Empire story arc started on February 25, 2017, as a sequel to the previous 26-episode remake under the title of Star Blazers: Space Battleship Yamato 2202 (Uchū Senkan Yamato 2202: Ai no Senshi-tachi) with the subtitle Warriors of Love. Funimation bought the rights to both remakes to create an English voiced dub.

Additionally, a feature film condensation of the 26-episode remake, Space Battleship Yamato 2199: Voyage of Remembrance (Uchū Senkan Yamato 2199: Tsuioku no Kokai), screened nationwide in Japan on October 11, 2014.

== Live-action adaptations ==
During the mid-1990s, Walt Disney Pictures optioned the rights with the intent to produce a Star Blazers live-action movie from producer Josh C. Kline. An early draft of the script by Oscar-nominated writer Tab Murphy was leaked on the Internet in the late 1990s. The story was a retelling of the Season One plot, and followed a ragtag crew of misfits (most of whom are not named after any of the original series' crew) aboard the rebuilt United States battleship Arizona on a mission to save Earth. The project was abandoned by Disney following the departure of David Vogel, Disney's President of Production. In April 2006, it was announced that another attempt at creating a live-action version of the story would be made, but no movie ever came out of it.

A Space Battleship Yamato live-action movie was released in Japan on December 1, 2010, produced by Toshiaki Nakazawa and Kazuya Hamana. The film was directed by Takashi Yamazaki.

In February 2011, it was announced that an English-language live-action version was in the works. David Ellison's Skydance Productions was in negotiations to acquire the rights. Christopher McQuarrie had been tapped to write the screenplay, but no dates have been announced. By October 2013, Deadline reported that McQuarrie was also attached as director of the film and as co-producer as well alongside Josh C. Kline, David Ellison and Dana Goldberg, with Shouji Nishizaki and Paul Schwake as executive producers for Skydance. By March 2017, Ellison stated in an interview with LRM (Latino Review Media) at South by Southwest that Skydance has hired Zach Dean to write the screenplay with McQuarrie still attached as director, aiming to have it done by the time McQuarrie finishes directing Mission: Impossible – Fallout.

== American comic adaptations ==
To date, four American comic adaptations have been published: a five-volume series retelling the original story, two comic book series, and, most recently, a webcomic.

=== West Cape Company Animation Comics ===
The first adaptation was a set of books presenting the original first season in five volumes using the original cel animation. It was published in 1983 by West Cape Co., Ltd. under their imprint, W.C.C. Animation Comics. The books use digest footage that was already laid out and published for the Japanese market as "film comics". The translations relied heavily on the English dialog of Star Blazers, with minor modifications. The English language editions were printed in Japan and distributed by Books Nippan of Los Angeles, the American branch of Nippon Shuppan Hanbai. The title of each book includes "Original Title: Space Cruiser Yamato" as a subtitle.

=== Comico ===
The second adaptation (actually two miniseries) was published by Comico Comics in the late 1980s and served as a postscript to the second season. The plot leveraged the fact that the Season Three script had misidentified the enemy in the New Voyage flashbacks as a remnant of the Comet Empire. The first series was printed in full process color instead of the hand separations used for printing most comic books. In this series, it was discovered that the White Comet Empire's rear fleet (comprising fully half of the empire's entire fleet) still existed and—with Earth's entire fleet (other than the Argo) having been wiped out—only the Argo stood between this massive enemy fleet and Earth. In this story, the Comet Empire took over the Yamato and used it against Earth. The second Comico miniseries dealt with the Star Force's battle against a renegade Earth General and his alien allies. Due to its weak artwork and story, this second miniseries was less well received than the first.

=== Voyager Entertainment print ===
From March 1995 to May 1997, Voyager Entertainment (under the Argo Press imprint) published twelve issues (#0–11) of Star Blazers: The Magazine of Space Battleship Yamato before publication was halted due to poor sales.

=== Voyager Entertainment webcomic ===
Star Blazers Rebirth is a webcomic formerly featured on the official Star Blazers site. Although similar in storyline, it is not to be confused with the newest Yamato film, Yamato: Rebirth. The art and story is by Tim Eldred, who was also responsible for the Voyager Entertainment series. The Earth is once again threatened by a menace from space headed for the Earth 25 years after the first series; this time in the shape of what appears to be a moving black hole. At first, Earth's government does not believe the information, on the basis that black holes aren't supposed to be able to move. However, they eventually agree to send Earth's newest and most powerful ship, Andromeda II, to investigate. Upon reaching its destination, Andromeda II is quickly destroyed with all hands on board, though not before transmitting data to Earth. Shocked by the disaster and the lack of response from Earth's government, Wildstar remains out of service. He is now in his 40s, with gray hair and a beard grown in deliberate homage to the late Captain Avatar. He is haunted by nightmares both of his past and alternate pasts- the nightmares come but different people die, or familiar faces have new names. Finally Wildstar and Sandor devote their wealth and energies to rebuilding the nearly shattered Argo. The ship had been encased in ice and left floating in Earth orbit at the end of Final Yamato. Since most of the old surviving bridge crew of Argo are now captains in command of their own ships, many of the new crew members are the children or grandchildren of the original Argo crew. Earth's evacuation to numerous colonies has left Earth's forces stretched far too thinly, with several colonies beginning to break away from Earth's control under command of Captain Nenezich. Short on supplies, Argo heads toward the center of the galaxy in an attempt to learn more about the mysterious black hole and a rash of attacks on Earth's colonies.

== Legacy ==
Television critic Matt Zoller Seitz of Vulture recommended the series in 2013 as one of eight great television series or miniseries people most likely have not seen before, stating that "this epic series about a refurbished battleship setting sail across the galaxy to save an apocalypse-ravaged Earth remains the reigning masterpiece of [the 1970s era of dubbed Japanese cartoons]—and its serialized storytelling was ahead of its time." In Seitz's 2016 book co-written with Alan Sepinwall titled TV (The Book), they wrote that this series or its original Japanese counterpart would have made their list of the top 100 greatest shows of all time had they not excluded foreign television from the list, citing their lack of sufficient knowledge for television outside the United States.

== Home video releases ==
DVDs of the three television seasons were released in 2002 by Voyager Entertainment, entitled The Quest for Iscandar, The Comet Empire and The Bolar Wars. Each season is contained on six discs, and each disc included bonus footage or material. The discs are available individually or as collections, in three separate boxed sets of six discs each.
