= Osamu Kobayashi (voice actor) =

Japanese voice actor (1934–2011)

- 小林 修
- Born: November 22, 1934; Tokyo City, Tokyo Prefecture, Japan
- Died: June 28, 2011 (aged 76); Bunkyō, Tokyo, Japan
- Occupation: voice actor
- Years active: 1950–2011
- Agent: Dojinsha Production

Osamu Kobayashi (小林修, Kobayashi Osamu; November 22, 1934 – June 28, 2011) was a Japanese voice actor.

== Biography ==
Kobayashi was the executive director of Dōjinsha Production. He was a baritone. He dubbed the voice of Yul Brynner in various movies.

On June 28, 2011, Kobayashi died of pancreatic cancer at age 76. His company closed after his death.

== Filmography ==
=== Live-action ===
- Ōgon Bat (1966) (Ōgon Bat) (voice)
- Kousoku Esper (1967) – Narrator
- Gamera: Super Monster (1980) – Captain (voice)
- Seiun Kamen Machineman (1984) – Narrator
- Kyodai Ken Byclosser (1985) Narrator
- Chouriki Sentai Ohranger (1995, Episode: 46) – Bara Guard (voice)
- Gekisou Sentai Carranger (1996, Episodes: 37-48) – Reckless Dash Emperor Exhaus / Exhaus Super-Strong (voice)

=== Television animation ===
- Ōgon Bat (1967) (Ōgon Bat)
- Space Battleship Yamato (1974) (Admiral Domel)
- Space Battleship Yamato II (1978) (Emperor Zwordar)
- Space Battleship Yamato III (1980) (Captain Jiro Dan)
- New Tetsujin-28 (1980) (Branch)
- Six God Combination Godmars (1981) (President Gyron)
- Story of the Alps: My Annette (1983) (Pierre)
- Panzer World Galient (1984) (Azbes)
- Space Legend Ulysses 31 (1991 NHK edition) (Ulysses)
- Noir (2001) (Salvatore)

=== Original video animation (OVA) ===
- Panzer World Galient: Tetsu no Monshō (1986) (Mādaru)
- Legend of the Galactic Heroes (1989) (Ottō Braunshweig)
- Mars (1994) (Chief Cabinet Secretary)

=== Theatrical animation ===
- Space Battleship Yamato (1977) – Domel
- Hokkyoku no Muushika Miishika (1979) (Muu)
- Phoenix 2772 (1980) – Boon
- Gamera: Super Monster (1980) – 'Zanon' Captain (voice)
- Be Forever Yamato (1980) – Osamu Yamanami
- Crusher Joe: The Movie (1983) – Bard
- Final Yamato (1983) – Captain Mizutani
- Silent Möbius 2 (1992) – Combined Apparition
- Legend of the Galactic Heroes: Overture to a New War (1993) – Otto Von Braunschweig
- Doraemon: Nobita and the Windmasters (2003) – Yaku
- Crayon Shin-chan: The Storm Called: The Kasukabe Boys of the Evening Sun (2004) – Chris
- Space Battleship Yamato: Resurrection (2009) – Blue Noah Captain

=== Video games ===
- Kingdom Hearts II (2005) (The Emperor of China)
- Toy Story 3: The Video Game (xxxx, Japanese dub) (Prospector)

=== Dubbing roles ===
==== Live-action ====
- Yul Brynner
  - Anastasia (General Bounine)
  - The Brothers Karamazov (Dmitri Karamazov)
  - The Magnificent Seven (Chris Adams)
  - Taras Bulba (Taras Bulba)
  - Invitation to a Gunfighter (Jules Gaspard d'Estaing)
  - Cast a Giant Shadow (Asher)
  - Return of the Seven (Chris Adams)
  - Triple Cross (Col. Baron von Grunen)
  - The Double Man (Dan Slater / Kalmar)
  - Villa Rides (Pancho Villa)
  - Battle of Neretva (Vlado)
  - The File of the Golden Goose (Peter Novak)
  - Adiós, Sabata (Sabata/Indio Black)
  - Catlow (Catlow)
  - Fuzz (The Deaf Man)
  - Night Flight from Moscow (Vlassov)
  - Westworld (Gunslinger)
  - The Ultimate Warrior (Carson)
- 12 Angry Men (1969 TV Asahi edition) (Juror #1 (Martin Balsam))
- Amadeus (1986 TV Asahi edition) (Leopold Mozart (Roy Dotrice))
- Big (MacMillan (Robert Loggia))
- Chain Reaction (1999 TV Asahi edition) (Dr. Paul Shannon (Morgan Freeman))
- Coming to America (1991 Fuji TV edition) (King Jaffe Joffer (James Earl Jones))
- The Crazies (1979 Fuji TV edition) (David (W.G. McMillan))
- Days of Thunder (Tim Daland (Randy Quaid))
- Deliverance (Lewis Medlock (Burt Reynolds))
- Die Hard (1990 TV Asahi edition) (Dwayne T. Robinson (Paul Gleason))
- The Distinguished Gentleman (Dick Dodge (Lane Smith))
- Dracula: Prince of Darkness (Alan Kent (Bud Tingwell))
- Dune (Padishah Emperor Shaddam IV (José Ferrer))
- El Dorado (Cole Thornton (John Wayne))
- First Blood (1999 Nippon TV edition) (Colonel Sam Trautman (Richard Crenna))
- The Full Monty (Gerald Arthur Cooper (Tom Wilkinson))
- The Glenn Miller Story (1968 TV Asahi edition) (Don Haynes (Charles Drake))
- Harry Potter and the Goblet of Fire (Alastor "Mad-Eye" Moody (Brendan Gleeson))
- Harry Potter and the Order of the Phoenix (Alastor "Mad-Eye" Moody (Brendan Gleeson))
- Harry Potter and the Deathly Hallows – Part 1 (Alastor "Mad-Eye" Moody (Brendan Gleeson))
- Hulk (Thaddeus "Thunderbolt" Ross (Sam Elliott))
- Iron Will (J.W. Harper (David Ogden Stiers))
- Jacob's Ladder (1993 Nippon TV edition) (Louis Denardo (Danny Aiello))
- Loaded Weapon 1 (General Curtis Mortars (William Shatner))
- The Longest Day (1997 TV Tokyo edition) (Benjamin H. Vandervoort (John Wayne))
- The Matrix Reloaded (2006 Fuji TV edition) (Captain Mifune (Nathaniel Lees))
- The Matrix Revolutions (2007 Fuji TV edition) (Captain Mifune (Nathaniel Lees))
- National Treasure (Patrick Henry Gates (Jon Voight))
- National Treasure: Book of Secrets (Patrick Henry Gates (Jon Voight))
- Pride and Glory (Francis Tierney, Sr. (Jon Voight))
- Raiders of the Lost Ark (1985 Nippon TV and 1993 DVD edition) (Sallah (John Rhys-Davies))
- Rawhide (Gil Favor (Eric Fleming))
- Remo Williams: The Adventure Begins (George Grove (Charles Cioffi))
- The Rookie (Jim Morris Sr. (Brian Cox))
- Scrooged (Preston Rhinelander (Robert Mitchum))
- Secondhand Lions (Garth McCann (Michael Caine))
- Sherlock Holmes (Sir Thomas Rotheram (James Fox))
- Top Gun (1989 Fuji TV edition) (CDR Tom "Stinger" Jordan (James Tolkan))
- The Towering Inferno (1989 TBS edition) (James Duncan (William Holden))

==== Animation ====
- The Fantastic Four (Mister Fantastic)
- Mulan (The Emperor of China)
- Mulan II (The Emperor of China)
- Toy Story 2 (Stinky Pete the Prospector)
- We're Back! A Dinosaur's Story (Rex)

== Successors ==
- Katsunosuke Hori — Hyouge Mono: Fujitaka Hosokawa
- Ikuya Sawaki — Second Super Robot Taisen Z Reunion: Branch
- Akimitsu Takase — Mission: Impossible: Willie Armitage
- Minoru Inaba — Under Siege 2: Dark Territory: Admiral Bates (TV Asahi version)
- Hideyuki Tanaka — Anpanman: Mr. Cherokee
- Jin Urayama — Amadeus: Leopold Mozart
- Ryokai Morita — Enter the Dragon: Han (TBS version)
- Kenyu Horiuchi — Monkey Business: Dr. Burnaby Fulton (Cary Grant)
