= Rokurō Naya =

Japanese actor and narrator (1932–2014)

- 納谷六朗
- Born: 20 October 1932; Tokyo City, Tokyo Prefecture, Empire of Japan
- Died: 17 November 2014 (aged 82); Ōta, Tokyo, Japan
- Occupations: Actor; voice actor; narrator
- Years active: 1954–2014
- Agent: Mausu Promotion
- Height: 165 cm (5 ft 5 in)
- Relatives: Gorō Naya (brother)

Rokurō Naya (納谷 六朗, Naya Rokurō; 20 October 1932 – 17 November 2014) was a Japanese actor, voice actor, narrator and the younger brother of voice actor Gorō Naya (1929–2013). He was a lifelong resident of Tokyo and was affiliated with Mausu Promotion at the time of his death.

== Filmography ==
=== Television animation ===
1970

- Akakichi no Eleven (Masada, Takeshi Kamioka)

1973

- Samurai Giants (Tarobei Hatsuma)

1974

- Urikupen Kyūjotai (Narrator)

1976

- Dokaben (Hikaru Yoshitsune)

1977

- Wakakusa no Charlotte (Night)

1978

- Space Battleship Yamato II (Yasuhiko Yamada)
- Galaxy Express 999 (Burudasu)
- Future Boy Conan (Territ)
- Lupin III: Part II (Aide, Kousuke Kindani, Stephan)

1979

- Toshi Gordian (Barry Hawk)

1980

- Tondemo Senshi Muteking (Sonny Yuki)
- The Wonderful Adventures of Nils (Marcos)
- Mū no Hakugei (Cold, Kaim)
- Ashita no Joe 2 (Wolf Kanagushi)

1981

- Urusei Yatsura (Hanawa)
- Rokushin Gattai God Mars (Gira)

1982

- Fairy Princess Minky Momo (Papa)

1984

- Saber Rider and the Star Sheriffs (Frantz)
- Chikkun Takkun (Papa)

1985

- Ninja Robots (Kegare Sanada)
- Magical Star Magical Emi (Junichi Kazuki)
- Lupin III Part III (Doron)

1986

- Saint Seiya (Aquarius Camus)
- Highschool! Kimengumi (Kyū Daima)
- Maison Ikkoku (Kozue's Father)

1987

- City Hunter (General)

1988

- City Hunter 2 (Ishikawa)
- Hello! Lady Lin (George)

1989

- The New Adventures of Kimba The White Lion (Lamp)
- Ranma ½ (Hyottoko/Ryuukichi)

1990

- Tanoshii Moomin Ikka (Fredrickson)

1991

- Anime Himitsu no Hanazono (Henry)
- Three Little Ghosts (Chokkiri-san)

1992

- Crayon Shin-chan (Enchou, Professor Gou)
- Lupin the 3rd: From Siberia with Love (Duke Brown)

1993

- Tico and Friends (Thomas LeConte)
- YuYu Hakusho (Shinobu Sensui)

1994

- Juuni Senshi Bakuretsu Eto Ranger (Nyorori)
- Street Fighter II V (Dorai)

1997

- Flame of Recca (Mori Kouran)

1998

- Super Doll Licca-chan (Dr. Scarecrow)
- The Mysterious Cities of Gold (Casper)
- Tokyo Pig (Old Man)

1999

- Kyoro-chan (Dr. Matsgeer, Inspector Nirami)

2000

- Hidamari no Ki (Ushikubo Tohbei)

2001

- Noir (Zellner)
- Hikaru no Go (Honinbou Kuwabara)
- Pokémon (Keith Basquiat)

2002

- Asobotto Senki Goku (Kyuzou)
- Jing: King of Bandits (King Cointreau)
- Patapata Hikōsen no Bōken (Agenore San Bellan)
- Mirage of Blaze (Ujimasa Hojo)

2003

- Astro Boy (Dr. Pavlos)
- Avenger (Metis)

2004

- Destiny of the Shrine Maiden (Orochi)
- Zatch Bell! (Dr. Riddles)

2005

- Gallery Fake (Jimi)
- Jinki:Extend (Genta Ogawara)
- Black Cat (Maison Ordrosso)

2006

- Black Jack (Old Man)
- Pokemon Advance (Teira)
- Ramen Fighter Miki (Toshiyuki)

2007

- Oh! Edo Rocket (Goinkyo)
- Emily of New Moon (Jimmy Murray)
- Reideen (Furuki)

2008

- Nogizaka Haruka no Himitsu (Ouki Nogizaka)
- Mokke (Skeleton)
- Lupin III: Sweet Lost Night – Magic Lamp's Nightmare Premonition – Jodan

2009

- Umi Monogatari ~Anata ga Ite Kureta Koto~ (Matsumoto)
- Guin Saga (Gajus)
- The Book of Bantorra (Ganbanzel Grof)
- Fullmetal Alchemist: Brotherhood (Grumman)
- One Piece (Haredas)

2010

- Psychic Detective Yakumo (Hideyoshi Hata)
- Durarara!! (Old Painter)
- The Legend of the Legendary Heroes (King of Nelpha)
- In Solitude Where We Are Least Alone (Akira's Grandfather)
- Rainbow - Nisha Rokubō no Shichinin (Hayakawa)

2011

- Digimon Xros Wars (Kotemon)

2012

- Eureka Seven AO (Christophe Blanc)

2014

- Knights of Sidonia (Old Man)

=== Theatrical animation ===
- Golgo 13 (1983) (Bishop Moretti)
- Nitaboh (2004) (Osyo)
- Crayon Shin-chan series (1993–2014) (Enchou)
- Professor Layton and the Eternal Diva (2009) (Dr. Andrew Schraeder)
- Fuse Teppō Musume no Torimonochō (2012) (Zanzo)

=== Original video animation (OVA) ===
- FAKE (1996) (Leonard Henry)
- Shamanic Princess (1996) (The Throne of Yord)
- Batman: Gotham Knight (2008) (James Gordon)

=== Video games ===
- Lunar: The Silver Star (1992) (Ghaleon)
- Lunar: Eternal Blue (1994) (Ghaleon)
- Grandia (1997) (Gadwin)
- Panzer Dragoon Saga (1998) (Zadoc)
- Jade Cocoon: Story of the Tamamayu (1998) (Kikinak, Wind Boss)
- Spyro 2: Ripto's Rage (1999) (Foreman Bud)
- Professor Layton and the Diabolical Box (2008) (Dr. Andrew Schraeder)
- Galaxy Angel (2002) (Luft Weizen)
- Way of the Samurai 4 (2011) (Kinugawa Onsen)
- Chaos Rings II (2012) (Death)
- Zero Escape: Virtue's Last Reward (2012) (Tenmyouji)
- Etrian Odyssey Untold 2: The Fafnir Knight (2014) (Reischutz)
- Fire Emblem Fates (2015) (Gunter, Anankos)
- Fire Emblem Heroes (2017) (Gunter)

=== Tokusatsu ===
- Jaguar-man (1967) (Taro Gingaker (Voice)/Jaguar-man)
- Kamen Rider (1971) (Takeshi Hongo (Voice)/Kamen Rider Ichigo in episodes #9 – 10)
- Robot Detective (1973) (Missileman (ep. 22))
- Chojin Bibyun (1976) (Haniwarn (ep. 13))
- Gekisou Sentai Carranger (1996) (XX Mileno (ep. 27))
- Seijuu Sentai Gingaman (1998) (Wisdom Tree Moak (eps. 3 – 48, 50))
- Juken Sentai Gekiranger (2007) (Sky Fist Demon Kata (eps. 1, 10 – 34))
- Samurai Sentai Shinkenger (2009) (Ayakashi Nakinakite (ep. 13))

=== Dubbing roles ===
==== Live-action ====
- William H. Macy
  - Homicide (Tim Sullivan)
  - ER (David Morganstern)
  - A Civil Action (James Gordon)
  - Psycho (Milton Arbogast)
  - Jurassic Park III (Paul Kirby)
  - In Enemy Hands (Nathan Travers)
  - Bobby (Paul Ebbers)
  - A Single Shot (Pitt)
- Brad Dourif
  - Child's Play 2 (Chucky)
  - Child's Play 3 (Chucky)
  - Bride of Chucky (Chucky)
  - Seed of Chucky (Chucky)
  - Curse of Chucky (Chucky)
- Ed Harris
  - The Firm (1999 Fuji TV edition) (Agent Wayne Terrance)
  - Milk Money (Tom Wheeler)
  - Apollo 13 (Gene Kranz)
  - The Truman Show (DVD edition) (Christof)
- Gary Oldman
  - Batman Begins (James Gordon)
  - The Dark Knight (James Gordon)
  - The Dark Knight Rises (James Gordon)
- 24 (Christopher Henderson (Peter Weller))
- The 36th Chamber of Shaolin (Hung Hsi-Kuan)
- Another Stakeout (Tony Castellano (Miguel Ferrer))
- Assault on Precinct 13 (1980 TV Tokyo edition) (Lawson (Martin West))
- Awakenings (DVD edition) (Dr. Kaufman (John Heard))
- Casualties of War (DVD edition) (Sergeant Tony Meserve (Sean Penn))
- Dave (Dave Kovic (Kevin Kline))
- Dead Again (Gray Baker (Andy García))
- Dick Tracy (Mumbles (Dustin Hoffman))
- Dragonheart (Lord Felton (Jason Isaacs))
- Dragons Forever (Hua Hsien-Wu (Yuen Wah))
- Explorers (1992 Fuji TV edition) (Mr. Müller (James Cromwell)) (Recorded on DVD)
- The Extraordinary Adventures of Adèle Blanc-Sec (Dieuleveult (Mathieu Amalric))
- From the Earth to the Moon (Georges Méliès (Tchéky Karyo))
- Garden State (Gideon Largeman (Ian Holm))
- Ghostbusters II (Egon Spengler (Harold Ramis))
- The Goonies (1988 TBS edition) (Francis Fratelli (Joe Pantoliano)) (Regular Version Recorded on 25th Anniversary DVD and Blu-ray, and Uncut Version recorded on 35th Anniversary Blu-ray)
- Goosebumps (Mr. Matthews (Maurice Godin)) (Attack of the Mutant Parts I & II)
- The Great Gatsby (1984 TBS edition) (George Wilson (Scott Wilson))
- Harlem Nights (Sugar Ray (Richard Pryor))
- Hawaii Five-0 (Elliott Connor (James Remar))
- The Hunt for Red October (DVD edition) (Commander Bart Mancuso (Scott Glenn))
- In The Heat of the Night (1983 TBS edition) (Harvey Oburst (Scott Wilson)) (Recorded on Blu-ray alongside the NET Dub)
- Invasion of the Body Snatchers (1986 TBS edition) (Jack Bellicec (Jeff Goldblum)) (Recorded on Blu-ray)
- Jurassic Park (Donald Gennaro (Martin Ferrero))
- The Killer (Fung Sei)
- The Lost World: Jurassic Park (Eddie Carr (Richard Schiff))
- Mad Max Beyond Thunderdome (1988 Fuji TV edition) (The Pig Killer (Robert Grubb))
- Major League (DVD edition) (Roger (Corbin Bernsen))
- Missing in Action 2: The Beginning (1988 TV Tokyo edition) (Lieutenant Anthony Mazilli) (Recorded on Blu-ray)
- The Mummy (DVD edition) (Dr. Allen Chamberlain (Jonathan Hyde))
- North by Northwest (1971 Tokyo Channel 12 edition) (Leonard (Martin Landau))
- Not a Penny More, Not a Penny Less (Robin Oakley (Nicholas Jones))
- The Peacemaker (Vlado Mirić (Rene Medvešek))
- The Pelican Brief (Thomas Callahan (Sam Shepard))
- Police Story (1987 Fuji TV edition) (Superintendent Raymond Li (Lam Kwok-Hung)) (Recorded on DVD and Blu-ray)
- Prometheus (Peter Weyland (Guy Pearce))
- The River Wild (Tom Hartman (David Strathairn))
- Scent of a Woman (Mr. Trask (James Rebhorn))
- Stormbreaker (Alan Blunt (Bill Nighy))
- Super Mario Bros. (1994 NTV edition) (Spike (Richard Edson)) (Recorded on Blu-ray)
- Switchback (Jack McGinnis (William Fichtner))
- Trouble with the Curve (Gus Lobel (Clint Eastwood))
- Vegas Vacation (Clark Griswold (Chevy Chase))
- West Side Story (1990 TBS edition) (Doc (Ned Glass))

==== Animation ====
- Animaniacs (Ferman Flaxseed)
- Batman: The Animated Series (Scarecrow)
- Darkwing Duck (The Liquidator/Bud Flud)
- Heathcliff and the Catillac Cats (Grandpa Nutmeg)
- Iron Man (Century, Justin Hammer)
- J.R.R. Tolkien's The Lord of the Rings (Gollum)
- Meet the Robinsons (Bud)
- One Hundred and One Dalmatians (Roger Radcliffe)
- Rango (Spoons)
- SpongeBob SquarePants (Squidward Tentacles, Mermaid Man, Patchy the Pirate, Flying Dutchman, Dirty Bubble, Man Ray, Painty the Pirate (season 1-2) Perch Perkins, Old Man Jenkins, King Neptune (seasons 1, 6), Bubble Bass (season 8) and Additional Voices (seasons 1-8))
- The New Batman Adventures (Scarecrow)
- Tarzan II (Zugor)
- Thomas the Tank Engine & Friends (Sir Topham Hatt (succeeding Takeshi Aono) and Sir Lowham Hatt)
- The Simpsons (Mayor Quimby (season 2, first appearance), J. Loren Pryor (seasons 1-2))
- Tugs (Captain Star, Bluenose, Izzy Gomez, The Pirates and The Fuel Depot Owner)
- X-Men: The Animated Series (Professor X)

==== Live-action and Animation ====
- Who Framed Roger Rabbit (Psycho, Mickey Mouse)
