= La Seine no Hoshi =

Japanese anime television series

ラ・セーヌの星 (Ra・Sēnu no Hoshi)
- Genre: Superhero
- Created by: Mitsuru Kaneko
- Anime television series
- Directed by: Masaaki Ōsumi (#1–26); Yoshiyuki Tomino (#27–39)
- Written by: Sōji Yoshikawa
- Music by: Shunsuke Kikuchi
- Studio: Soeisha
- Original network: Fuji TV
- Original run: April 4, 1975 – December 26, 1975
- Episodes: 39

La Seine no Hoshi (ラ・セーヌの星, Ra Sēnu no Hoshi) is a Japanese anime series by Soeisha (later renamed as Sunrise), which premiered in Japan on Fuji TV from April 4, 1975, and finished its run on December 26, 1975, spanning a total of 39 episodes. The title translates to English as "The Star of the Seine" or "The Seine's Star". It is based on Alain Delon's 1964 movie The Black Tulip (which, in spite of the title, is based on Alexandre Dumas, père's novel The Black Tulip in name only).

It was created by Mitsuru Kaneko, and directed by Masaaki Ōsumi (episodes 1-26) and Yoshiyuki Tomino (episodes 27-39). It was written by Sōji Yoshikawa, while the character designer was Akio Sugino. The music for the series was composed by Shunsuke Kikuchi.

== Plot ==
The story is set in Paris, on the eve of the French Revolution. The civilians have been suffering under the tyrannical rule of Louis XVI. In order to release the people from their suffering, Simone, a young florist girl whose parents were killed by the aristocrats, decides to challenge the corrupted aristocrats. Covering her face with a red mask and leaving a red carnation as a mark of her presence, Simone is "La Seine no Hoshi" ("The Star of the Seine" or "The Seine's Star").

Simone also seeks revenge for her deceased parents, who were killed by the henchmen of Marie Antoinette and Louis XVI. She is supported in this by Robert de Forge, who has long been active as the heroic outlaw "Black Tulip". Her adventures repeatedly lead her to the French court, and Simone eventually learns that Marie Antoinette is her half-sister. To conceal this, she and her foster parents were persecuted, while others wanted to uncover the secret. Then Simone was drawn into the turmoil of the French Revolution. She wanted to continue helping the oppressed people, but also took in Marie Antoinette's children to protect them. The Reign of Terror was about to begin in France. Simone, Robert, Danton, Louis XVII and Marie Therese left France as a new family.

== Staff ==
- Original Creator: Emukei (Mitsuru Kaneko)
- Chief Director: Masaaki Ōsumi (episodes 1-26)
- Assistant Director, Episode Director and Storyboards: Tetsu Dezaki
- Supervising Director: Masaaki Ōsumi (episodes 27-39)
- Director: Yoshiyuki Tomino (episodes 27-39)
- Screenplay: Sōji Yoshikawa
- Character Design: Akio Sugino
- Animation Directors: Mitsuo Shindō, Hisashi Sakaguchi
- Music: Shunsuke Kikuchi
- Music Performers: Mitsuko Horie, Otowa Yurikago Kai, Koorogi '73 and others

== Cast ==
- Simone/La Seine no Hoshi: Terumi Niki
- Robert de Forge/Black Tulip: Taichirō Hirokawa
- Danton: Masako Nozawa (a possible reference to Georges Danton)
- Zarar: Kiyoshi Kobayashi
- Duke de Forge: Mikio Terashima
- Marie-Antoinette, Queen of France: Reiko Mutō
- Louis XVI, King of France: Osamu Saka
- Prince Louis Charles: Yoneko Matsukane
- Princess Marie Therese: Kazue Komiya
- Burierre: Yūji Fujishiro
- Francis, Holy Roman Emperor: Kōhei Miyauchi
- Hans Kaunitz: Masashi Amenomori
- Michelle: Yōko Asagami
- Crojaille: Shigeyuki Hosokawa
- Catherine: Noriko Ohara
- Guibon: Mahito Tsujimura
- Duke of Orléans: Michihiro Ikemizu
- Milan: Kei Tomiyama
- François: Yumi Nakatani
- Riyon: Eken Mine
- Charlotte: Kazuko Sugiyama
- Angélique: Rihoko Yoshida
- Choureau: Sanji Hase
- Papa: Kōichi Kitamura
- Mama: Ayako Tsuboi
- Marquess de Moralle: Jōji Yanami
- Narrator: Taichirō Hirokawa
