= Captain Cosmic =

Local children's television series

Captain Cosmic was a late-afternoon weekday TV show aired in the San Francisco Bay Area on KTVU-2 from September 19, 1977 to January 18, 1980. The show was created, produced, and hosted by Bob Wilkins in the guise of Captain Cosmic, airing serials, primarily featuring Japanese superheroes.

== Background ==
The show was forced to kick off with the original Flash Gordon serials because of a delay in the shipment of The Space Giants from distributor Lakeside Television, but soon eased into its format with episodes of Ultraman, Johnny Sokko and his Flying Robot, Captain Scarlet and the Mysterons, Spectreman, Star Blazers and Star Trek: The Animated Series. Programming in the first year was also supplemented by serialized versions of Japanese monster movies such as Dogora, the Space Monster and Godzilla vs. The Thing, cut into five parts and run Monday through Friday. There was also one, two-hour Prime Time special, featuring the movie Godzilla vs. Megalon on November 8, 1978 at 8:00 pm.

The show was created after Wilkins and his family vacationed in Hawaii and experienced the explosion of live action Japanese superhero television series broadcast on Honolulu's KIKU TV-13, and was further spurred onto the airwaves in the wake of Star Wars, capitalizing on the popularity of science fiction. The character of Captain Cosmic flew around the galaxy in his spaceship with his sidekick "Wonder Robot 2T2", and was "faster than a speeding BART train" according to the opening sequence. Captain Cosmic would feature guests on the show, from local fans and celebrities, to actors from science fiction films and television series, such as Anthony Daniels and David Prowse. "Within three weeks of going on the air, Captain Cosmic was the number one children’s program in the Bay Area." The show had a fan club with decoder cards. A weekly message would be shown that only members with decoder cards would be able to decipher (the code consisted of a three-shift alpha replacement) on upcoming events and new shows being added to the line-up.

Despite its popularity, Wilkins decided to leave Captain Cosmic at the 11th Hour, instead of renewing his contract; he was transitioning out of television, in the wake of bowing out of hosting Creature Features after eight years (January 9, 1971 to February 24, 1979), and returning to concentrate on his own advertising agency. After more than 15 years as an on-air personality, he retired from television with the final broadcast of KTXL-40's The Bob Wilkins Double Horror Show on February 14, 1981. Captain Cosmic's trusty sidekick, Wonder Robot 2T2, currently resides at the comic book emporium Atlantis Fantasyworld in Santa Cruz, California.
