= Tomoharu Katsumata =

Japanese film director (born 1938)

Tomoharu Katsumata (勝間田 具治, Katsumata Tomoharu; born in February 4, 1938 in Shimoda, Shizuoka, Japan) is a Japanese film director best known for his work on various anime works. A leading director at the Toei Animation studio during the 1960s, 1970s, and 1980s, Katsumata worked as a director on several of Toei's anime television adaptations of manga by Go Nagai, including Devilman (1972), Mazinger Z (1972), Cutey Honey (1973), Great Mazinger (1974), UFO Robo Grendizer (1975) and Gaiking (1976) (both Grendizer and Gaiking became later part of Jim Terry's Force Five package on U.S. television). Katsumata also directed a TV adaptation of Silver Fang -The Shooting Star Gin- in 1986.

== Early life ==
Katsumata graduated from Nippon University's film school in 1960 and began working with the Kyoto division of the Toei Company that same year as an assistant director to Masahiro Makino, Eiichi Kudo, Tomotaka Tasaka on his samurai dramas. After a few years, Katsumata moved to Toei Doga (Toei Animation) in Tokyo, working as a director on some of Toei's early television series, including Wolf Boy Ken (1963), the original Cyborg 009 anime (1968) and Tiger Mask (1970).

Among Katsumata's other credits for Toei as a director include the TV series Captain Future (1978), Fist of the North Star (1984) and OVA series Saint Seiya: Hades (2005, episodes 14 to 31), and the feature films Mazinger Z vs. Devilman (1973), The Little Mermaid (Anderusen Douwa Ningyo Hime, 1975), and Arcadia of My Youth (1982). Katsumata also directed New Attacker You (続・アタッカーYOU 金メダルへの道 Zoku atakkā YOU- kin medaru e no michi?) for Knack Productions in 2008.

== List of works ==
=== TV Anime ===
- Ken the Wolf Boy (1964, Director)
- Shonen Ninja Kaze no Fujimaru (1964, Director)
- Rainbow Sentai Robin (1966, Director)
- Sally the Witch (1st series) (1966, Director)
- Pyunpyunmaru (1967, Director)
- Akane-chan (1968, Director)
- Cyborg 009 (1968, Director)
- Sabutora and Ichi's Detective Stories (1968, Director)
- GeGeGe no Kitaro (1st series) (1968, Director)
- Himitsu no Akko-chan (1st series) (1969, Director)
- Tiger Mask (1969, Director)
- Devilman (1972, Director)
- Mazinger Z (1972, Director)
- Cutie Honey (1973, Director)
- Great Mazinger (1974, Director)
- Getter Robo (1974, Director)
- Shonen Tokugawa Ieyasu (1975, Director)
- Getter Robo G (1975, Director)
- UFO Robot Grendizer (1975, Chief Director)
- Magnerobo Ga-Keen (1976, Director)
- Daikengo, the Guardian of the Universe (1976, Director)
- Planet Robot Danguard Ace (1977, Chief Director)
- Captain Future (1978, Chief Director)
- King Arthur: Prince of the Round Table (1979, Director)
- Space Carrier Blue Noah (1979, Director)
- Dr. Slump Arale-chan (1981, Director)
- Hello! Sandybell (1981, Director)
- Arcadia of My Youth: Endless Orbit SSX (1982, Chief Director)
- Dream Soldier Wingman (1984, Series Director)
- Video Warrior Laserion (1984, Storyboard)
- Fist of the North Star (1984, Director)
- Ginga: Nagareboshi Gin (1986, Series Director)
- Saint Seiya (1986, Director)
- GeGeGe no Kitaro (4th series) (1996, Director)
- Yu-Gi-Oh! (1998, Director)
- Mamotte Shugogetten! (1998, Director)
- Mushrambo (2000, Director)
- Salaryman Kintaro (2001, Director)
- Bōken Ō Beet (2004, Director)
- Play Ball (2005, Storyboard)
- Gaiking: Legend of Daikū-Maryū (2005, Storyboard)
- Ring ni Kakero 1: Nichibei Kessen Hen (2006, Director)
- Powerpuff Girls Z (2006, Director)
- Tai Chi Chasers (2007, Storyboard)
- GeGeGe no Kitaro (5th series) (2007, Director)
- HeartCatch PreCure! (2010, Director)
- Tanken Driland (2012, Director)
- Saint Seiya Omega (2012, Director)
- Tanken Driland -1000-nen no Maho- (2013, Director)
- Abarenbō Rikishi!! Matsutarō (2014, Director)
- Tiger Mask W (2016, Director)

=== Theatrical Anime ===
- Tiger Mask (1970, Director)
- The Three Musketeers in Boots (1972, Director)
- Mazinger Z vs. Devilman (1973, Director)
- Himitsu no Akko-chan (1973, Director)
- Andersen Douwa: Ningyo Hime (1975, Director)
- Farewell to Space Battleship Yamato: Warriors of Love (1978, Animation Director)
- Captain Future (1979, Director)
- Yamato Forever (1980, Chief Director)
- Hashire Melos! (1981, Director)
- Future War 198X (1982, Director)
- Arcadia of My Youth (1982, Director)
- Space Battleship Yamato: Final Chapter (1983, Director)
- The Prince of Snow Country (1985, Director)
- Odin: Photon Sail Starlight (1985, Producer)
- St. Elmo's Fire: The Visitor of Light (1986, Director)
- Romance of the Three Kingdoms Series (Director)
  - Part I: Dawn of the Heroes (1992)
  - Part II: Burning Yangtze! (1993)
  - Final Chapter: Faraway Land (1994)
- Rokudenashi Blues 1993 (1993, Director)
- GeGeGe no Kitaro: Daikaiju (1996, Director)

=== OVA ===
- Shika to Kanta (1991, Producer)
- Taiheiyō ni Kakeru Niji (1992, Producer)
- The Human Revolution (1995, Director)
- Futari no Ouji-sama (1996, Director)
- Light Kingdom of the Himalayas (1999, Director)
- Inochi Kagayaku Tomoshibi (1999, Director)
- Sango no Umi to Ouji (2000, Director)
- Daisōgen to Hakuba (2000, Director)
- Sabaku no Kuni no Ohjo-sama (2001, Director)
- Sabaku no Takara no Shiro (2002, Director)
- Ano Yama ni Noborou yo (2003, Director)
- Dai Yamato Zero-go (2004, Director)
- Hana to Shonen (2004, Producer)
- Saint Seiya: The Hades Chapter - Meikai Hen (2005, Series Director)
- Kagayake! Yūjō no V-Sign (2005, Producer, Director)
- Saint Seiya: The Hades Chapter - Elysion Hen (2008, Series Director)
