= Susumu Kodai =

Fictional character from the Space Battleship Yamato franchise

- Space Battleship Yamato character
- Created by: Yoshinobu Nishizaki
- Portrayed by: Takuya Kimura
- Voiced by: Kei Tomiyama; Takuya Kimura; Daisuke Ono; Kōichi Yamadera; Kenneth Meseroll

In-universe information
- Species: Human
- Gender: Male
- Title: Captain
- Family: Mamoru Kodai (brother); Miyuki Kodai (daughter); Sasha Kodai (niece)
- Spouse: Yuki Mori
- Nationality: Japanese

Susumu Kodai (古代進, Kodai Susumu) is a fictional character appearing in Space Battleship Yamato. In the Star Blazers localization, he is known as Derek Wildstar, also known as Jason Kodai in the English dub of the first Yamato movie.

== Character commentary ==
In the series, he is the leader of the Battle Group, and later serves as the deputy captain. In Farewell to Space Battleship Yamato, he is promoted to Captain following the death of Captain Okita. He is also the captain in Space Battleship Yamato III.

His older brother is Mamoru Kodai, captain of the Yukikaze.

According to Leiji Matsumoto's notes in the paperback edition of "Space Battleship Yamato," Kodai was originally supposed to resemble Nobotta Ooyama of "Otoko Oidon," or Futoshi Adachi of "Ganso dai Yojohan o Monogatari." He was redesigned at the sponsors' request to make him "cool like Hiromi Go."

His name comes from the hero of Matsumoto's earlier work, "Kousoku Esper," Susumu Kodai. Additionally, Matsumoto's younger brother is named Susumu Matsumoto.

== Appearance in the original series ==
Space Battleship Yamato
Kodai is 18 years old when the series begins. As a child, he had a gentle personality who liked insects and disliked fighting. His parents were killed in a Gamillas bomb attack on Kanagawa Prefecture in 2193. He swore revenge on the Gamillas and he developed a hot-headed personality.
He became the Yamato's Battle Group leader after graduating from Space Warrior Training School, either sitting on the bridge or piloting a Cosmo Zero. He initially blamed Captain Okita for his brother, Mamoru's death at Pluto, and he often clashed with his friend and training school classmate, Daisuke Shima, on whether to prioritize combat or exploration. However, as he continued the voyage to Iscandar with his friends, including Shima and Shiro Sanada, and got to know Okita better, his rash personality changed.
He was promoted to Acting Captain in Episode 20 after Okita's condition worsened. In Episode 25, he reunites with his presumed dead brother, Mamoru, who chose to stay with his love, Queen Starsha, rather than return to Earth. After the final battle with the Gamillas in episode 24, Kodai concluded that there were more important things than fighting. He and crewmate Yuki Mori become lovers during their voyage.
Farewell to Space Battleship Yamato
Twenty years old (the story begins on the anniversary of captain Okita, September 5 or 6). On the Earth of 2201 reconstructed and rebuilt, he was in the escort of the 15th Resource Transport Fleet as the captain, Destroyer. The relationship with snow has progressed, the wedding ceremony is coming up close but will receive a mysterious message on the way home returning to work. When we analyze with Sanada on the earth and ascertain that it is something of a relief message, including the relevance to the white comet approaching the Earth Earth Federation Government, but the ancients who were dismissed for reasons of incorrect content protested to this and traveled to Yamato for a source of the message. Eventually, arrived Terezart star is the message sender Teresa, receives the information of approaching the Earth White Comet Empire and challenges the decisive battle with the comet empire in the Earth sphere. Lastly, while holding the dead body of snow, antimatter To super huge battleship with Theresa who is the world Special Offer。
Space Battleship Yamato II
Appears from the first episode. The main story is similar to "Farewell", but the ancient task is not the escort of the resource ship but the commander of the outer fleet, and the ship is also not an escort ship but a Yamato.
White Comet In the fight with the empire, I will pretend to retire from Yamato with the surviving crew and remain intact, trying to specialize on a super huge battleship, but after persuading Teresa, I remembered a special thing and stayed alone for myself I will see her going to specialize. Lastly, we return to Earth with Yamato, along with the snow which Yamato also remained and the island entrusted by Theresa.
Yamato: The New Voyage
As a representative on behalf of the captain, while trusting hands, he trained new crew members and raised them as warriors of a single servant. Knowing the crisis of Iskandar with electric shock from Desler, head towards the rescue of Earth's benefactor Starsha and defense, and develop a joint front with Destler against Dark Star Clone Empire. As a result, although I was not able to stop the runaway of Iskandar it was to see the end of Starsha, but she is a daughter of a guardian and a brother and a couple Sasha.
Friendship with him who germinated during the joint fight with Dezzer leads to friendship with the Garman Gamiras Empire that he later rebuilt.
Be Forever Yamato
Appointed the captain of the 10th crewed patrol boat. After suddenly heading to the Mars base that became unsuspected, it gets involved in the battle between the Earth fleet and the enemy fleet in the Earth's surrounding airspace. Returning to the earth and returning to the earth and returning to the earth and former Yamato crew headed to Yakumo's hidden asteroid Icarus, but snow was injured in enemy attacks on the way, the earth was left behind, further brother / guardian also died I will know later. After that, as a crew member of Yamato, we are going on a voyage to the enemy mother star while holding the loneliness without
Space Battleship Yamato III
Appears from the first episode. It is appointed Captain Yamato. In the midst of the crisis of the destruction of the earth due to the promotion of fusion abnormality of sun which began to be involved in the interstellar war of Garman · Gamiras Empire and Bora Commonwealth, Start off searching the earth. In the battle, new crews such as Ryusuke Dumon and Yuto Takei are sacrificed While hurting my heart to the way it is, I will establish a friendly relationship with the Garman-Gamiras Empire and the Earth Federation, contribute to the prosperity of the Earth Federation and succeed in controlling the sun.
Final Yamato
Milky Way, when suddenly a red galaxy emerging from different dimension collides, when the disaster occurs, Yamato heads for investigation, but rescue acts in Dingill star I will repent and resign as captain by giving out many victims due to the attack of hyper radiation missile from the subsequent Dingil ship.
Although he wanders around the boundary of life and death in that battle, he barely took up his life and returned to Yamato before his departure. In Yamato, under the rebirthing Okita, he is reappointed as a battle group leader. After seeing Oita sinking with Yamato after being separated from the island which was the best friend from the trainee era, it is tied with snow in the last scene.
Space Battleship Yamato: Resurrection
Thirty-eight years old. Although he was given a snowfall of his only daughter with the snow, he was a captain of the deep space cargo ship Yuki while unfitting the peaceful Earth and growing a stubble unfit in the universe with the wife, he was almost separated. In 2220, when returning to Earth for the first time in three years, I learned about the immigration plan due to approaching black hole and the missing snow and took Captain Yamato again as commander of the 3rd Immigration Fleet Escort Fleet.
In the play, we are conducting not only command but also navigation, in the beginning we manipulated Brunoa in a wrecked state, thrust into the bosom of the SUS ship that attacks at high speed, and immediately after slipping the closest ship up and down In addition to showing the arrogance of turning 180 degrees back to 180 degrees, in the battle at the BH 199 Black Hall, she is responsible for the ship as himself, despite being captain, on behalf of Jun Kobayashi, who fights at a shipboard aircraft.

== Remake animation ==
In this series with the first work of Space Battleship Yamato 2199 [remake] work of "Space Battleship Yamato", the settings were reconstructed from the original animation series (hereinafter referred to as old works) The tactics department, the position was the tactical chief, the rank became lieutenant (first squad). Born in 2178 July 7

=== Appearance in the remake series ===
Space Battleship Yamato 2199
Initial appearance in scene waiting on Mars for the mission to contact with messenger from Iskandar in episode 1. Age is 20 years old。
The circumstances up to the Yamato ship has been changed, the war dead of the defense took place in the place where it was the 3rd lieutenant of the 7th club group space tactics department, the 2 nd special promotion and the tactical chief are lost and it rides to Yamato . Unlike the old work Sanada was in charge of substitution of Okita as deputy manager, he did not concurrently serve as captain.
Since the content has been crowd-dramatized due to the increase in characters, the original action of dictatorship is not to be abandoned In a hot-blooded person, the story does not progress well, so it has been changed to a calm personality
However, in the fourth episode, like discussing the future strategy behaviors in the same way as the old work, he insists on Gamiras' plan to attack the Pluto base and is contesting with the island that appeals to the Iskandar. Also, when the snow was kidnapped by Gamirasu in the seventh color star cluster battle of the 20th episode, leave it to anger and make a violent attack on the enemy lightning strike party, so as to be calm on the surface even in the 21st episode after the battlefield and 22nd episode Although it shows, in the place where there is no eye sight, he is stomping his anger with his own helplessness. On the other hand, in the final story, snow is behaving brightly as usual with enemy bullets even in heavy condition, and also when asked to conceal the death of snow, but also temporarily lamented when the snow died, like other crews There is a caring-looking depiction.
Cartoon version (Muruwa Michio)
The distrust of Okita was stronger than the animated version, and it was not able to resolve the crawl after the Yamato ship, Heard the interaction of Okita and Mamoru from the voice of the navigation diary of destroyer ship Yukikaze which had been crashing to Enceladus, the will of defense Knowing and eliminating the distrust of Okita
In addition, the hatred for Gamirasu is also stronger than the animation version, and in the No.2 operation, it was annihilated ruthlessly with Gamirasu, but it rushes to Yamato to escape the flagship Destreria class, I understand that the Gamirasu people are the same" people "as the earthlings
The novel version (Toyoda Tsutomu)
The opponent who exchanges alcohol with Okita at the Solar System Equator Festival is not an animated version of Tokugawa, but it is ancient as well as an old work. In addition, the action in anti-submarine fighter warfare has been changed from explicit command violation to dedicated dedicated to military aircraft. In addition, the coup d'état on the planet Bimera 4

Also involved in things that were not deeply involved in animation, such as:

Space Battleship Yamato 2199 Star Cruising Ark
When encountering with the Gatlantis fleet, both Okita and Sanada were absent, so they are temporarily responsible for combat command. When confined in the planet Shambreu, build a relationship of trust with Burger and Gamirasu people, formally given the command of Yamato at the decisive battle at the Gatlantis fleet, struggle with a joint front with Gamirasu.
In this work, turning is close to the captain's representation
On the launch of "2199", Ono who was in charge of the voice appealed "In the latter half of the series only says Snow! Snow!", so the spot can be hit hard in this work, from Okita to the ancient times, And it was given the role of telling from the ancient times to the future generation。
Star Blazers: Space Battleship Yamato 2202
The first appearance in the scene of the eighth floating continent recaptation strategy in episode 1. Age is 24 years old. After returning to the Earth, it is politically isolated around the pros and cons of "Wave artillery fleet plan", and at the beginning of this volume he is the captain of the battleship "Yuunagi" which is the 47th ship of the Earth Federation Defense Force 2nd escort destroyer fleet It was. I am engaged to snow.
Ambassador Gamiras Ambassador Loren Burrell told her about the circumstances of the earth government including "Time Fault" through secret meetings with Ambassador Gamirasu and respond to messages from Theresa Yamato Unnoticed start. In this work he is appointed acting as captain in the form delegated from Sanada.

== Live-action movie ==
In the live-action film Space Battleship Yamato, Kodai is 33 years old and was born on October 31, 2166. He was the Ace of the Cosmo Zero Corps. On one mission, he led his team to shoot down the Gamilas planetary bombs headed for Earth. He accidentally deflected a bomb into the path of an orbiting space station where his parents lived, which resulted in their deaths.

Kodai quit the Earth Defense Force after the incident and started living as a scavenger for rare metals on the radioactive Earth. One day, a space capsule with an artifact crashes nearby. The impact destroys his radiation suit but the artifact saves him. He is later picked up by the military for decontamination and debriefing.

He re-enlists in the military after hearing the call for volunteers for a mission to Iscandar to retrieve the terraforming device. He is assigned to the Yamato and is appointed the ship's tactical officer. Although initially reluctant and believing himself unworthy, Kodai would later take on the role of acting captain of the Yamato.
