= Space Battleship Yamato III =

Television anime

- Cover of the DVD Box

宇宙戦艦ヤマトIII (Uchū Senkan Yamato Surī)
- Genre: Military sci-fi, space opera
- Created by: Leiji Matsumoto; Yoshinobu Nishizaki
- Anime television series
- Directed by: Leiji Matsumoto; Eiichi Yamamoto; Kazunori Tanahashi
- Produced by: Motoo Fukuo; Osamu Yamane; Kazuo Yokoyama; Tetsuhisa Yamada
- Written by: Eiichi Yamamoto; Keisuke Fujikawa; Eimei Yamamoto; Shouji Nemoto
- Music by: Hiroshi Miyagawa
- Studio: Tokyo Dōga (Note: The studio went through numerous name changes, which are listed as follows for the sake of consistency with other articles listing the studio: Animation Staff Room (1972–1973); Academy Productions (1973–1980); Tokyo Dōga (1980–1982); and West Cape Corporation (1982–1997).)
- Original network: NNS (YTV)
- Original run: October 11, 1980 – April 4, 1981
- Episodes: 25

Space Battleship Yamato III (宇宙戦艦ヤマトIII, Uchū Senkan Yamato Surī), also known as Star Blazers: The Bolar Wars, is a Japanese military science fiction anime series produced by Academy Productions. It is the sequel to Be Forever Yamato created by Yoshinobu Nishizaki and Leiji Matsumoto. It aired on Yomiuri TV in Japan from October 11, 1980, to April 4, 1981. Elements of Yamato III were remade in the 2024–2026 series Space Battleship Yamato 3199.

== Plot ==
The plot centers about the drama which ensues when a stray proton missile, from a battle between the Galman Empire and the Bolar Federation, crashes into the Sun. It causes nuclear fusion to accelerate to unsafe levels. The Yamato and crew must then set out on a mission to look for a new world for the human race. They must do so in less than one year.

Over the course of the story, the Yamato and crew must complete their mission of finding a new home for Earthlings amidst the strife caused by the Galman-Bolar conflict. The Galmans, we learn, are the ancestral race from which the Gamilas came. After the battle with the Dark Nebula Empire ended, a battle which destroyed the planet Gamilas, Desler and his remaining forces set out to search for this ancestral homeland. They found Galman, enslaved by the cruel grey-skinned aliens known as the Bolars. They promptly liberated Galman, and a galaxy-wide war ensued.

The Yamato and crew eventually catch up with Desler, who is deeply remorseful that Earth has been dragged into this conflict. Desler dispatches a team of Gamilas-Galman scientists to attempt to restore the Sun. This effort ultimately fails.

During the course of the mission, the Yamato rescues Ruda, the exiled queen of the mysterious and hidden planet, Shalbart. It turns out that she is worshipped by peace-seeking factions within both the Galman and Bolar empires, and is wanted (preferably dead) by both governments which fear her influence. This puts a strain on the fragile alliance between Earth and the Galmans, and causes the Bolars to declare outright war against Earth.

Earth is finally saved when the Yamato brings Ruda to Shalbart, and she decides to give the Earthlings a device (the Hydro-Cosmogen Gun) that can restore the Sun's natural fusion balance. But even this only succeeds after some ultimate sacrifices on the part of some of Yamato's crew.

== Cast ==
- Noriko Ohara as Sabera
- Kei Tomiyama as Susumu Kodai
- Yōko Asagami as Yuki Mori
- Akira Kamiya as Shirou Katou
- Goro Naya as Gustav
- Eiji Kanie
- Takeshi Aono
- Masatō Ibu Desler, Heikurō Tōdō
- Kouji Yada (General Talon)
- Kenichi Ogata (Analyzer)
- Keiko Han (Ruda Sharubāto)
- Kazuo Hayashi (Yasuo Nanbu)
- Hirotaka Suzuoki (Kojirou Ohta)
- Hideyuki Tanaka (Ryuusuke Damon)
- Junpei Takiguchi
- Kaneto Shiozawa
- Kôhei Miyauchi (Shalibart Elder)
- Mugihito as (Dagon)
- Shigeru Chiba
- Sumi Shimamoto
- Shōzō Iizuka
- Tesshō Genda
- Tohru Furuya as Daisuke Tokugawa
- Tomomichi Nishimura
- Toshio Furukawa as Takeshi Ageha
