= Gorō Naya =

Japanese voice actor and narrator (1929–2013)

- 納谷悟朗
- Born: 17 November 1929; Hakodate, Hokkaidō, Japan
- Died: 5 March 2013 (aged 83); Chiba, Chiba, Japan
- Occupations: Actor, voice actor, narrator, theatre director
- Years active: 1951–2012
- Known for: Voice of Inspector Koichi Zenigata in the Lupin III franchise; Voicing Captain Jūzō Okita in the Space Battleship Yamato franchise
- Spouse: Kachiko Hino
- Relatives: Rokurō Naya (brother)

Gorō Naya (納谷悟朗, Naya Gorō; 17 November 1929 – 5 March 2013) was a Japanese actor, voice actor, narrator and theatre director from Hakodate, Hokkaidō. He was part of Theatre Echo all his career, and was the older brother of actor and voice actor Rokurō Naya.

== Biography ==
Gorō Naya was born on 17 November 1929 in Hokkaidō. At the age of 15, he joined the Kamikaze, believing "My life is to die for His Majesty the Emperor." Afterwards he thought he lost "things that take youth", and then attended Ritsumeikan University, becoming a dialect coach, specialising in that of Kyoto and finding himself interested in acting: "Eventually, I started thinking, "Hey, maybe you should do this." That's what started it. Until then, I had never thought about acting at all."

Before joining Theater Echo in 1959, he acted at the children's stage company Todo and at Ina no Kai, and performed in radio drama, gaining an affinity for narration. He also developed a love of the stage, saying "Even if the content is the same, the atmosphere, including the play, will differ depending on the reaction of the audience. It's only for one day." When he joined, new actors were selected for dubbing foreign-language films for TV. "There weren't many actors who could dub the voices, so I was really busy." The transition was easy for him, as "I felt the same as if I had been given a role on stage. The only difference was that there was no audience in front of me."

Naya became the official Japanese dubbing voice of actors Clark Gable, Charlton Heston, Lee Van Cleef and John Wayne after Akiji Kobayashi dropped out. On whether his voice would be better than Kobayashi's he said "I just did it because I was told to do it, and whether my performance was good or not is a matter for later.The evaluation was made by the audience, so there was no 'good' or bad." Despite his prolific voice work, he did not like being referred to as a voice actor (or ateshi), claiming "I'm not proud of using it, but it wasn't a word I didn't like that much." Naya got his younger brother Rokurō into voice acting while he was dubbing Conrad Philips in The Adventures of William Tell, requesting he, with a similar voice to his own, dubbed Tell's impostor.

In 1969 Naya began his association with Lupin the Third with the Pilot Film, voicing Goemon Ishikawa, a role subsequently taken by Makio Inoue. In 1971 he began voicing Koichi Zenigata, gaining a passion for his character. "I like the single-minded devotion to chasing after Lupin. This innocence (?) makes me very envious of someone like me, who has a lot of troubles in life." He was best friends with Yasuo Yamada, voice of Arsène Lupin III until his death in 1995, having lived in a rented beach house with him. Naya suggested to him "Let's keep chasing Lupin and Zenigata even if we both get old and wrinkled."

Also in 1971 he became the voice of the Great Leader in Kamen Rider. He would reprise the role many times over his career, saying "There are more jobs that are said to be, and I am doing it because I am grateful." In 1974 he became the voice of Juzo Okita in Space Battleship Yamato He was initially angry about being involved. "Why do I have to play such an old man?" Later he regretted the voice he chose for the character, believing "If you're an active captain, you're in your 50s, so I should have done it younger."

Naya was a fan of the Hanshin Tigers, once commentating on a game as "Hanshin Crazy Goro Naya", and supported the Japanese Communist Party. In 1985 he underwent surgery for a stomach ulcer, which hindered his physical and vocal ability. He lamented "I've been out of breath since the late 90s, and my physical condition has gotten worse. I was frustrated because people around me said, "I don't have a smooth tongue" behind my back." At Yamada's funeral he said "Hey, Lupin, who should I chase from now on? If you're dead, who will I chase now?"

He criticised the modern voice acting industry, claiming "There are too many voice actors who think that they should just give their voices. They don't think they have a customer in front of them." In 2010 he stepped down from voicing Zenigata, the reason being "Zenigata never gets old, but I get older year by year, so it's a little bit difficult to match." He died on 5 March 2013, at age 83, due to chronic respiratory failure.

== Filmography ==
=== Film ===
Year	Title	Role	Notes
1965	Invasion of Astro-Monster	Councilman	Voice only
1969	Lupin the Third: Pilot Film	Goemon Ishikawa	Voice only
1969	Flying Phantom Ship	Ghost Captain	Voice only
1970	30,000 Miles Under the Sea	King Magma VII	Voice only
1971	Ali Baba and the Forty Thieves	Goro	Voice only
1972	Kamen Rider vs. Ambassador Hell	Great Leader of Shocker	Voice only
1973	Kamen Rider V3 vs. Destron Mutants	Great Leader of Destron	Voice only
1974	Prophecies of Nostradamus	Kazuo Ota	
1978	Farewell to Space Battleship Yamato	Juzo Okita	Voice only
1978	The Mystery of Mamo	Koichi Zenigata	Voice only
1979	Galaxy Express 999	Dr. Pan	Voice only
1979	Aim for the Ace!	Chairman Ryuzaki	Voice only
1979	The Castle of Cagliostro	Koichi Zenigata	Voice only
1982	Future War 198X	Tono	Voice only
1983	Crusher Joe	Kowalsky	Voice only
1983	Final Yamato	Juzo Okita	Voice only
1983	Golgo 13: The Professional	Leonard Dawson	Voice only
1984	Nausicaä of the Valley of the Wind	Lord Yupa	Voice only
1985	Night on the Galactic Railroad	Dr. Bulganillo	Voice only
1985	Legend of the Gold of Babylon	Koichi Zenigata	Voice only
1985	Odin: Photon Sailer Starlight	Kuramoto and Narrator	Voice only
1986	Dragon Ball: Curse of the Blood Rubies	Bongo	Voice only
1995	Farewell to Nostradamus	Koichi Zenigata	Voice only
1996	Lupin III: Dead or Alive	Koichi Zenigata	Voice only
1997	Noiseman Sound Insect	Professor Franken	Voice only
2003	Kamen Rider 555: Paradise Lost	Wirepuller of Smart Brain	
2004	Casshern	Narrator	
2007	Kamen Rider: The Next	Great Leader	Voice only
2011	OOO, Den-O, All Riders: Let's Go Kamen Riders	Great Leader	Voice only

=== Television ===
Year	Title	Role	Notes
1965-1967	Kimba the White Lion	Clave	52 episodes
1966-1968	Yuusei Kamen	Hoihensu	39 episodes
1967-1968	Princess Knight	Sir Nylon	52 episodes
1968-1969	Dororo	Kagemitsu Daigo Tanosuke	26 episodes
1968	Star of the Giants	President Hidaka	Episode 7 "Ball of Vanity"
1968	Humanoid Monster Bem	Prison Director	Episode 4
1970	Akakichi no Eleven	Narrator	18 episodes
1971-1972	Ryu the Primitive Boy	Kiba	22 episodes
1971-1972	Lupin III	Koichi Zenigata	17 episodes
1971-1973	Kamen Rider	Great Leader of Shocker (voice)	98 episodes
1972	Mirrorman	Invaders	4 episodes
1972	Henshin Ninja Arashi	Majin Sai (voice)	23 episodes
1972-1973	Ultraman Ace	Ultraman Ace (voice)	52 episodes
1972-1973	Warrior of Love Rainbowman	Narrator	50 episodes
1973–1974	Kamen Rider V3	Great Leader of Destron	52 episodes
1973–1974	Karate Master	Tatsu Todd Wakamatsu	11 episodes
1973–1974	Casshan	Narrator	35 episodes
1974-1975	Kamen Rider Amazon	Narrator	24 episodes
1974-1975	Space Battleship Yamato	Juzo Okita	26 episodes
1975	Kamen Rider Stronger	Great Leader (voice)	6 episodes
1976	Combattler V	Dr. Nanbara	3 episodes
1976	The Kagestar	Dr. Satan (voice)	24 episodes
1976–1977	Ninja Captor	Narrator	43 episodes
1976–1977	Chojin Bibyun	Gulver (voice)	15 episodes
1977	Jetter Mars	Dr. Yamanoue	27 episodes
1977-1980	Lupin the 3rd Part II	Koichi Zenigata	155 episodes
1978	The Petit Prince	Grandpa	Episode 16 "Sea of Flying Gulls"
1978-1979	Uchū Majin Daikengo	Narrator	26 episodes
1979-1980	Kamen Rider (Skyrider)	Great Leader (voice)	7 episodes
1980-1981	Space Battleship Yamato III	Narrator	25 episodes
1981-1982	Six God Combination Godmars	Emperor Zuul	33 episodes
1982	White Fang Story	Weedon Scott	TV movie
1984	Birth of the 10th! Kamen Riders All Together!!	Generalissimo of Badan (voice)	TV special
1984-1985	Lupin III Part III	Koichi Zenigata	19 episodes
1989-2010	Lupin III TV specials	Koichi Zenigata	22 specials
1989	Kamen Rider Black RX	Emperor Crisis (voice)	3 episodes
1989-1990	Blue Blink	Haruhiko Shiki	11 episodes
1998	Master Keaton	Shou	Episode 11 "Special Menu"
2000-2003	The Big O	Gordon Rosewater	6 episodes
2001-2008	One Piece	Crocus	5 episodes
2004	Monster	Blind Old Man	Episode 5
