= Kei Tomiyama =

Japanese actor and narrator (1938–1995)

- 富山 敬
- Born: Kunichika Tomiyama (冨山 邦親); October 31, 1938; Anshan, Manchukuo
- Died: September 25, 1995 (aged 56); Shinjuku, Tokyo, Japan
- Occupations: Actor; voice actor; narrator
- Years active: 1960–1995
- Agent: Production Baobab

Kunichika Tomiyama (冨山 邦親, Tomiyama Kunichika; October 31, 1938 – September 25, 1995), better known professionally by his stage name Kei Tomiyama (富山 敬, Tomiyama Kei), was a Japanese actor, voice actor, and narrator.

He was affiliated with multiple talent agencies during his career, including Aoni Production and Production Baobab.

Tomiyama is best known for his roles in Tiger Mask as Naoto Date/Tiger Mask, Space Battleship Yamato as Susumu Kodai, UFO Robo Grendizer as Duke Fried/Daisuke Umon, the Time Bokan series as the Narrator, GeGeGe no Kitarō as Nezumi-Otoko, Chibi Maruko-chan as Tomozō Sakura and Shintarō Honami, and Legend of the Galactic Heroes as Yang Wen-li.

== Early life and education ==
Kunichika Tomiyama was born on October 13, 1938, in Anshan, a city that was then part of the Japanese puppet state of Manchukuo (its territory is now part of the modern-day People's Republic of China). He was the oldest of three brothers; but his siblings died in an accident and from malnutrition, respectively. After World War II, his family returned to Japan, first moving to Miyazaki Prefecture, and then to Setagaya ward in Tokyo.

He was a "theater boy" who had been a member of school drama clubs since he was in junior high, and was part of the drama club of Seisoku High School in Minato, Tokyo. He studied theater at the Nihon University College of Art, but after deciding that "studying at school and actually acting are different", he dropped out to become a trainee at the Ashi Theater Company.

== Career ==
He joined the Toho Children's Theatre Company in his second year of high school in 1955, making his stage debut as the pirate Kuroji in the Kusadao Mizusawa play Golden Nightingale. After about three years of activity, he left the company to focus on his university studies.

After the Ashi Theater Company, which he joined after dropping out of university, disbanded two years into his tenure, he took entrance exams for other theater companies, and worked a variety of menial jobs, including as a bartender, host, and a food hawker.

In 1957, he made his voice acting debut as Takemaru in the Tohoku Broadcasting Company radio drama Genkuro Monogatari. As voice acting was not considered a full-time occupation for actors like him to pursue yet, he initially worked in the field to earn money for his theater career and living expenses.

His first few voice acting roles in anime were secondary characters in shows such as Gigantor (1963), Prince Planet (1965), Astro Boy (1965), Oraa Guzura Dado (1967), Speed Racer (1967), Ōgon Bat (1967), Princess Knight (1967), Animal 1 (1968), and Dokachin the Primitive Boy (1968).

His first starring role was as Sabu in Sabu to Ichi Torimono Hikae in 1968. He became a popular voice actor with his distinctively tender voice, portraying numerous roles during his career, ranging from heroic to comedic, and young to old.

== Death ==
At 9:07 am on September 25, 1995, Tomiyama suddenly died of pancreatic cancer in Shinjuku, Tokyo at the age of 56.

In 2007, he was posthumously awarded the Special Achievement Award at the first Seiyu Awards.

== Successors ==
After Tomiyama's death, numerous voice actors took over his ongoing roles.

- Takeshi Aono (Chibi Maruko-chan as Tomozō Sakura)
- Nobuo Tobita (Chibi Maruko-chan as Shintarō Honami)
- Hideyuki Tanaka (SD Vierra as SD Istiono)
- Tomohiro Nishimura (Soreike! Anpanman as SL Man)
- Junpei Takiguchi (Time Bokan 2000: Kaitou Kiramekiman (Time Bokan series) as the Narrator)
- Toshihiko Nakajima (Time Bokan 2000: Kaitou Kiramekiman (Time Bokan series) as Odatebuta)
- Kōichi Yamadera (Space Battleship Yamato as Susumu Kodai, Idol Defense Force Hummingbird as President Yajima, Grendizer as Duke Fried (Super Robot Wars), Yatterman as the Narrator and Odatebuta)
- Kenyū Horiuchi (Grendizer as Duke Fleed (Super Robot Wars Complete Box))
- Yasunori Matsumoto (Bokan Desuyo as Ippatsuman and Odatebuta)
- Shigeru Ushiyama (Batman: The Animated Series as Mad Hatter)
- Hozumi Gōda (Legend of the Galactic Heroes as Yang Wen-li)
- Kappei Yamaguchi (Looney Tunes as Bugs Bunny)
- Chafurin (Barbapapa as Barbapapa)
- Naoki Tatsuta (Winnie-the-Pooh as Rabbit)
- Tomokazu Seki (Area 88 as Micky Simon, Space Emperor God Sigma as Toshiya Dan (Super Robot Wars)
- Masanobu Takashima (Honey, I Shrunk the Audience! as Dr. Wayne Szalinski)
- Seirou Ogino (Jojo's Bizarre Adventure as Vampire C)
- Takumi Yamazaki (Shima Spain Village Parque Espana as Don Quixote)
- Kenichi Suzumura (Legend of the Galactic Heroes: Die Neue These as Yang Wen-li)

In the Harlock Saga, in addition to replacing Tomiyama as Tochiro, Kōichi Yamadera also supplied the voice of Captain Harlock which up to that point was done by Makio Inoue.

== Filmography ==
=== Television animation ===
1960s

- Gigantor (1963)
- Prince Planet (1965) (Pike)
- Astro Boy (1965) (Saltan)
- Oraa Guzura Dado (1967) (Papa)
- Speed Racer (1967) (Sabu)
- Ōgon Bat (1967)
- Princess Knight (1967)
- Animal 1 (1968) (Tōjirō)
- Dokachin the Primitive Boy (1968) (Dr. Northenpunk)
- Sabu to Ichi Torimono Hikae (1968) (Sabu (#1-33))
- Star of the Giants (1968) (Haruhiko Makiba (Third), Kōji Ōta, newspaper reporter)
- Attack No.1 (1969)
- Otokoippiki Gakidaishō (1969) (Mankichi Togawa)
- Tiger Mask (1969) (Naoto Date/Tiger Mask)
- Kamui the Ninja: Stories Other Than the Legend (1969) (Shirō)
- Roppō Yabure-kun (1969) (Yabure Roppō)

1970s

- The Adventures of Hutch the Honeybee (1970) (Hutch's Noppo)
- Bakuhatsu Gorō (1969) (Hiroshi Kubota)
- Andersen Monogatari (1971) (Tom, Wong, Swallow)
- Mokku of the Oak Tree (1972) (Chikaro the Monkey)
- The One Who Loves Justice: Moonlight Mask (1972) (Jiro Saito)
- Science Ninja Team Gatchaman (1972) (Priest Alan, Michael)
- Samurai Giants (1973) (Ban Banba)
- Bôken Korobokkuru (1973) (Eji Sonta)
- Mazinger Z (1973) (Junichi)
- Little Wansa (1973) (Kuma)
- Space Battleship Yamato series (1974) (Susumu Kodai)
- Hurricane Polymar (1974) (Preview Narrator)
- Ganba no Bōken (1975) (Gakusha)
- La Seine no Hoshi (1975) (Milan)
- Time Bokan Series (1975) (Narration, Odatebuta, Sasayaki Reporter, Tommy Yama)
- Dog of Flanders (1975) (Claude)
- UFO Robo Grendizer (1975) (Daisuke Umon/Duke Fried, Fake Duke Fried)
- Candy Candy (1976) (Terrence Graham Grandchester)
- 3000 Leagues in Search of Mother (1976) (Mario)
- Blocker Gundan 4 Machine Blaster (1976) (Andrew Norton)
- Arrow Emblem: Hawk of the Grand Prix (1977) (Takaya Todoroki)
- Attack on Tomorrow (1977) (Fuwa, Narrator)
- Jetter Mars (1977) (Ham Egg)
- Yakyū-kyō no Uta (1977) (Tamaichiro Kunitachi)
- Wakusei Robo Danguard Ace (1977) (Jet Joe)
- Science Fiction Saiyuki Starzinger (1978) (Sir Djorgo)
- Animation Kikō: Marco Polo no Bōken (1979) (Marco Polo)
- The Ultraman (1979) (Chōichirō Hikari)
- Zenderman (1979) (Narrator, Odatebuta, Tommy Yama)
- Invincible Steel Man Daitarn 3 (1979) (Commander Anton)

1980s

- Astro Boy (1980) (Rainbow Parakeet)
- The Monster Kid (1980) (Bem)
- Space Emperor God Sigma (1980) (Dan Toushiya)
- The Wonderful Adventures of Nils (1980) (Rex)
- Bokura Mangaka: Tokiwa So Monogatari (1981) (Shotaro Ishimori)
- Ohayō! Spank (1981) (Fujinami)
- Sugata Sanshiro (1981) (Kinnosuke Natsume)
- Asari-chan (1982) (Iwashi Hamano/Papa)
- Acrobunch (1982) (Alta)
- Gyakuten! Ippatsuman (1982) (Sokkyu Go/Ippatsuman, Pig)
- Arcadia of My Youth: Endless Orbit SSX (1982) (Tochiro Oyama)
- Thunderbirds 2086 (1982) (Eric Jones)
- Miyuki (1983) (Yasujirō Kajima)
- Nine (1983) (Susumu Karasawa)
- Mīmu Iro Iro Yume no Tabi (1983) (Charles Darwin)
- Serendipity the Pink Dragon (1983) (Prime Minister Dolf)
- Once Upon a Time... Space (1984) (Professor Maestro)
- Yume Senshi Wingman (1984) (Shunichi Hokusou/Keytackler)
- GeGeGe no Kitarō (1985) (Nezumi Otoko)
- Sangokushi (1985) (Zhuge Liang)
- Urusei Yatsura (1985) (Invader (#167))
- Anmitsu Hime (1986) (Gennai Hiraga, delegation leader (#40))
- Maison Ikkoku (1986) (Iioka)
- Oh! Family (1986) (Papa)
- Around the World with Willy Fog (1987) (Rigodon)
- Kimagure Orange Road (1987) (Takashi Kasuga)
- Anpanman (1988) (SL Man)
- What's Michael? (1988) (Michael)
- Blue Blink (1989) (Henry)
- Kimba the White Lion (1989) (Ham Egg)

1990s

- Chibi Maruko-chan (1990) (Tomozou Sakura (First voice), Shintarō Honami (First voice))
- Kyatto Ninden Teyandee (1990) (Sontoku Emichi (#17))
- Musashi, the Samurai Lord (1990) (Bokuden)
- Obatarian (1990) (Yoshio)
- Tetsujin 28-Go FX (1993) (Doctor Mouse)
- Kyōfu no Kyō-chan (Downtown no Gottsu Ee Kanji) (1994) (Electricity shop assistant)
- Magic Adventures of Mumfie (1994) (Scarecrow)
- Fievel's American Tails (1995) (Chula)

=== OVA ===
- Area 88 (1985) (Micky Simon)
- Leda: The Fantastic Adventure of Yohko (1985) (Ringamu)
- Gall Force (1986) (Exenon)
- Yōtōden (1987) (Shinosuke Hayami)
- Legend of the Galactic Heroes (1988) (Yang Wen-li)
- The Fairy King (1988) (Cu Chulainn)
- Patlabor: The New Files (1992) (Zero)
- Final Fantasy: Legend of the Crystals (1994) (Gush Hassam)
- Barbapapa (1995) (Barbapapa, Narrator)

=== Theatrical animation ===
- Grendizer, Getter Robo G, Great Mazinger: Kessen! Daikaijuu (1976) (Daisuke Umon/Duke Fleed)
- UFO Robot Grendizer vs. Great Mazinger (1976) (Daisuke Umon/Duke Fleed)
- Space Battleship Yamato (1977) (Susumu Kodai)
- Farewell to Space Battleship Yamato (1978) (Susumu Kodai)
- Yamato: The New Voyage (1979) (Susumu Kodai)
- Be Forever Yamato (1980) (Susumu Kodai)
- Final Yamato (1983) (Susumu Kodai)
- Golgo 13 (1983) (Robert Dawson)
- Kimagure Orange Road (1989) (Takashi Kasuga)
- Time Bokan: Royal Revival (1993) (Narrator, Sasayaki Reporter, Tommy Yama)
- Crayon Shin-chan: Unkokusai's Ambition (1995) (Hieru-Jokoman)

=== Video games ===
- Space Battleship Yamato (1992) (Susumu Kodai)
- Mazinger Z (1994) (Duke Fleed)

=== Dubbing ===
==== Live-action ====
- Rick Moranis
  - Ghostbusters (1989 TV Asahi edition) (Louis Tully)
  - Spaceballs (1993 TBS edition) (Lord Dark Helmet)
  - Ghostbusters II (1992 Fuji TV edition) (Louis Tully)
  - Honey, I Shrunk the Kids (Wayne Szalinski)
  - The Flintstones (Barney Rubble)
- Martin Sheen
  - The California Kid (TV edition) (Michael McCord))
  - The Final Countdown (1989 TBS edition) (Warren Lasky)
  - The Dead Zone (1989 TV Asahi edition) (Greg Stillson)
  - The Believers (1991 TV Asahi edition) (Cal Jamison)
  - Wall Street (1992 TV Asahi edition) (Carl Fox)
- Woody Allen
  - Play It Again, Sam (Allan Felix)
  - Stardust Memories (Sandy Bates)
  - Broadway Danny Rose (Danny Rose)
  - Hannah and Her Sisters (1992 TV Asahi edition) (Mickey Sachs)
- Steve Martin
  - My Blue Heaven (Vincent 'Vinnie' Antonelli)
  - L.A. Story (Harris K. Telemacher)
  - Father of the Bride (George Banks)
  - A Simple Twist of Fate (Michael McCann)
- John Heard
  - Cat People (1985 Fuji TV edition) (Oliver Yates)
  - Home Alone (Peter McCallister)
  - Home Alone 2: Lost in New York (Peter McCallister)
- William Katt
  - The Greatest American Hero (Ralph Hinkley)
  - House (1988 TV Asahi edition) (Roger Cobb)
  - Baby: Secret of the Lost Legend (TV edition) (George Loomis)
- Roddy McDowall
  - Planet of the Apes (Cornelius)
  - The Legend of Hell House (Benjamin Franklin Fischer)
  - The Poseidon Adventure (1976 TBS edition) (Acres)
- Agatha Christie's Poirot (Captain Arthur Hastings (Hugh Fraser))
- Air America (1992 NTV edition) (Gene Ryack (Mel Gibson))
- Alien (1992 VHS/DVD edition) (Dallas (Tom Skerritt))
- The A-Team (Howling Mad Murdock (Dwight Schultz))
- Back to the Future (George McFly (Crispin Glover))
- Beverly Hills Cop (1988 TV Asahi edition) (Detective Axel Foley (Eddie Murphy))
- Dave (Alan Reed (Kevin Dunn))
- Enter the Dragon (1979 TV Asahi edition) (Lee (Bruce Lee))
- Family Ties (Steve Keaton (Michael Gross))
- Greystoke: The Legend of Tarzan, Lord of the Apes (1989 TBS edition) (Jake "John" Clayton (Paul Geoffrey))
- The Hunt for Red October (Jack Ryan (Alec Baldwin))
- The Jim Henson Hour (Jim Henson)
- Jurassic Park (Doctor Grant (Sam Neill))
- L.A. Law (Arnold Becker (Corbin Bernsen))
- Mad Max (1982 NTV edition) (Jim "Goose" Rains (Steve Bisley))
- Nineteen Eighty-Four (Winston Smith (John Hurt))
- Police Academy series (Lt. Proctor (Lance Kinsey))
- The Purple Rose of Cairo (Tom Baxter / Gil Shepherd (Jeff Daniels))
- Rain Man (1994 TBS edition) (Raymond Babbitt (Dustin Hoffman))
- Red Heat (1990 TV Asahi edition) (Detective Art Ridzik (James Belushi))
- The Poseidon Adventure (1991 TV Asahi edition) (James Martin (Red Buttons))
- Scrooged (Eliot Loudermilk (Bobcat Goldthwait))
- Starsky & Hutch (Huggy Bear (Antonio Fargas))
- Star Trek: The Original Series (Hikaru Sulu (George Takei))
- Throw Momma from the Train (Larry Donner (Billy Crystal))
- Trading Places (1986 NTV edition) (Billy Ray Valentine (Eddie Murphy))
- The Untouchables (1990 Fuji TV edition) (Oscar Wallace (Charles Martin Smith))
- West Side Story (1979 TBS edition) (Ice (Tucker Smith))
- The Empire Strikes Back (1992 TV Asahi edition) (C-3PO (Anthony Daniels))

==== Animation ====
- All Dogs Go to Heaven (Charlie B. Barkin)
- Batman: The Animated Series (Mad Hatter)
- DuckTales (Donald Duck)
- Looney Tunes (Bugs Bunny)
- The Rescuers Down Under (Jake)
- Spider-Man (Peter Parker/Spider-Man)
- Winnie-the-Pooh (Rabbit)
- Yellow Submarine (Ringo Starr)
