= Space Battleship Yamato II =

Anime that started in 1978

- Cover of the DVD-Memorial Box in Japan

宇宙戦艦ヤマト2 (Uchū Senkan Yamato Tsū)
- Genre: Military sci-fi, space opera
- Created by: Leiji Matsumoto; Yoshinobu Nishizaki; Toshio Masuda
- Anime television series
- Directed by: Leiji Matsumoto; Noboru Ishiguro (Note: Animation technical director (アニメーションディレクター).)
- Produced by: Osamu Hirooka
- Written by: Keisuke Fujikawa; Shunsuke Tate
- Music by: Hiroshi Miyagawa
- Studio: Academy Productions (Note: The studio went through numerous name changes, which are listed as follows for the sake of consistency with other articles listing the studio: Animation Staff Room (1972–1973); Academy Productions (1973–1980); Tokyo Animation (1980–1982); and West Cape Corporation (1982–1997).)
- Original network: NNS (YTV)
- Original run: October 14, 1978 – April 4, 1979
- Episodes: 26

Space Battleship Yamato II (Japanese: 宇宙戦艦ヤマト2, Hepburn: Uchū Senkan Yamato Tsū), also known as Star Blazers: The Comet Empire or Star Blazers II, is a Japanese military science fiction anime series produced by Academy Productions. It is the sequel to Space Battleship Yamato and an adaptation of the movie Arrivederci Yamato created by Yoshinobu Nishizaki and Leiji Matsumoto. It aired on Yomiuri TV in Japan from October 14, 1978, to April 4, 1979. It later got a remake in 2017 under the name Space Battleship Yamato 2202.

== Overview ==
As the popularity of the Space Battleship Yamato franchise became clear (largely because of the outcry from fans who saw the movie), a second season of the television series was produced, retconning the movie to present a different plot in which the Yamato and its primary characters were not killed off. Expanding the story to 26 episodes, the second season featured additional plot lines, such as a love story between Teresa (Trelaina) and Yamato crew member Daisuke Shima (Mark Venture), and an antagonism between Kodai and Saito (Knox), leader of a group of space marines. This season is considered the best by many fans on account of the strategic space fleet battles, the imaginative spaceship designs created by Studio Nue, and the character development of Gamilas leader Desler.

Footage from Arrivederci Yamato was reused in the second season, particularly in the opening titles; the sequence of the Yamato launching from water was also reused in two of the subsequent movies.

== Plot ==
The Year is 2201, two years after the defeat of the Gamillas Empire and the restoration of Earth, the planet is entering a new age of militarization with the completion of the new Intergalactic Ship, the Andromeda. However, the Gatlantis Empire (White Comet Empire), a new and even greater threat than the Gamilas, attacks Earth after the crew of the Yamato investigates an SOS signal from the mysterious Teresa of planet Telezart. At the same time Desler, leader of the Gamilas Empire, also seeks revenge for his defeat at the hands of the Yamato.

== Cast ==
- Kei Tomiyama as Susumu Kodai (Derek Wildstar)
- Yōko Asagami as Yuki Mori (Nova)
- Kazuo Hayashi as Yasuo Nanbu (Dash)
- Noriko Ohara as Savellah (Invidia)
- Isao Sasaki as Hajime Saito (Knox)
