= Miyuki Ueda =

Japanese actress and voice actress (born 1944)

- 上田 みゆき
- Born: June 2, 1944 (age 82); Tokyo, Japan
- Occupation: Actress
- Spouse: Isao Sasaki

Miyuki Ueda (上田 みゆき, Ueda Miyuki; born June 2, 1944 in Tokyo) is a Japanese actress and voice actress. She is married to singer Isao Sasaki and is a childhood friend of fellow voice actor Katsuji Mori.

== Notable voice work ==
=== Anime television series ===
- 8 Man (Sachiko Seki)
- City Hunter (Megumi Iwasaki)
- Chōdenji Robo Combattler V (Chizuru Nanbara)
- Chōdenji Machine Voltes V (Megumi Oka)
- Gatchaman II (Professor Pandora)
- Lady Georgie (Mary Buttman)
- Lupin III Part III (Sarah)
- Lupin III (2nd Series) (Cornelia, Patra Lawrence (fake))
- Miyuki (Miyuki Kashima's mother)
- The Rose of Versailles (Marie Antoinette)
- Tekkaman: The Space Knight (Hiromi Tenchi)
- Tōshō Daimos (Erika)
- Weiß Kreuz (Rex)

=== OVA ===
Year	Title	Role	Source
2003	The Galaxy Railways	Louie Fort Drake's mother	

=== Film ===
- Farewell Space Battleship Yamato (Teresa)
  - Be Forever Yamato (Starsha)
- Mobile Suit Gundam (Icelina Eschonbach)
- The Secret of NIMH (Mrs. Brisby)

=== Games ===
- Super Robot Wars Series (Chizuru Nanbara, Megumi Oka)

=== TV Drama ===
- Kamen Rider (Fumie Kawamoto, guest actress in episode 29)
- Barom One (Shizuka Shiratori)
- Ganbare!! Robokon (Yoshiko Ogawa)

=== Overseas dubbing ===
- Charlie's Angels – Kelly Garrett (Jaclyn Smith)
- The Concorde ... Airport '79 (1982 TV Asahi edition) – Isabelle (Sylvia Kristel)
- The Eiger Sanction – Jemima Brown (Vonetta McGee)
- Mac and Me – Janet Cruise (Christine Ebersole)
- Tourist Trap – Becky (Tanya Roberts)
