= Shūsei Nakamura =

Japanese actor and voice actor

- 仲村 秀生
- Born: Hideo Nakamura; March 9, 1935; Tokyo Prefecture, Japan
- Died: July 30, 2014 (aged 79); Tokyo, Japan
- Occupations: Actor; voice actor
- Years active: 1956–2012
- Height: 165 cm (5 ft 5 in)

Shūsei Nakamura (仲村 秀生,, Nakamura Shuusei; born Hideo Nakamura (仲村 秀男,, Nakamura Hideo); March 9, 1935 – July 30, 2014) was a Japanese actor and voice actor. Throughout his career he was represented by 81 Produce and later Production Baobab. He has referred to both Tokyo and Nagano Prefecture as his hometown.

He was most known for the roles of Tōru Rikiishi (Ashita no Joe) and Daisuke Shima (Space Battleship Yamato). After his retirement, Hideyuki Tanaka took up the role of Daisuke Shima for the PS2 Yamato game series. The role had previously been taken over for the film Final Yamato by Isao Sasaki, but this was before Nakamura's retirement.

Nakamura died on July 30, 2014, at a Tokyo hospital.

== Filmography ==
=== Anime television series ===
- Ashita no Joe (Tōru Rikiishi)
  - Ashita no Joe 2 (Tōru Rikiishi)
- Attack No. 1 (Coach Hongo)
- Ie Naki Ko (Inspector Aimes)
- Space Battleship Yamato series (Daisuke Shima)
- Gatchaman II (Narration)
- Gatchaman F (Sharam)
- Ginga Hyōryū Vifam (Fredrick Rodem)
- Princess Sarah (Tom Chrisford)
- Dancougar - Super Beast Machine God (Narration, Muge Zolbados)
- Dororo (Tahoumaru)

=== OVA ===
- Area 88 (Gou Mutsuki)
- Legend of the Galactic Heroes (Franchesk Romski)
- Dancougar - Super Beast Machine God (Narration, Muge Zolbados)

=== Anime films ===
- Attack No. 1 series (Coach Hongo)
- Space Battleship Yamato series (Daisuke Shima)

=== Dub work (TV) ===
- The Courtship of Eddie's Father (Tom Corbett: Bill Bixby)
- Ironside (Det. Sgt. Ed: Don Galloway)
- Combat! (Jack)
- ER (Kadalski: Paul Eiding)
- The Fugitive (Larry)
- UFO (Lew Waterman: Gary Myers)

=== Dub work (Film) ===
- Robert Wagner
  - Halls of Montezuma (1970 TBS edition) (Coffman)
  - Beneath the 12-Mile Reef (Tony Petrakis)
  - A Kiss Before Dying (Bud Corliss)
  - In Love and War (Frank "Frankie" O'Neill)
  - Harper (Allan Taggert)
- The Abyss (Virgil Brigman (Ed Harris))
- Alien (1980 Fuji TV edition) (Cain: John Hurt)
- Battle of the Bulge (DVD version) (Lt. Weaver: James MacArthur)
- Dirty Harry (Chico Gonzales: Reni Santoni)
- The Guns of Navarone (Pvt. Pappadimos: James Darren)
- Kramer vs. Kramer (Gressen: Bill Moor)
- Magnum Force (Neil Briggs: Hal Holbrook)
- The Passage (Perea: Marcel Bozzuffi)
- Tower of Death (Chin Ku: Hwang Jang-lee)

=== Tokusatsu ===
- Robotto Keiji (Voice of Detective Robot K)
