= Taichirō Hirokawa =

Japanese voice actor and narrator (1939–2008)

Taichirō Hirokawa 広川 太一郎
- Born: 広川 諶次郎 (Hirokawa Shinjirō); February 15, 1939; Tokyo, Japan
- Died: March 3, 2008 (aged 69); Shibuya, Tokyo, Japan
- Occupations: Voice actor, narrator
- Years active: 1962–2008

Taichirō Hirokawa (広川 太一郎, Hirokawa Taichirō; February 15, 1939 – March 3, 2008) was a Japanese voice actor and narrator. He was born in Tokyo on February 15, 1939, and died on March 3, 2008, in Shibuya from cancer. His death was announced at the beginning of the 2nd Seiyu Awards.

== Roles ==
=== Film ===
- Lupin the Third: Pilot Film (1969) (Arsène Lupin III)
- It's Tough Being a Man (1969) (Michio, Sakura's boyfriend)
- Warau Michael (2006) (Narrator)

=== Television dramas ===
- Phantom Agents (1964) (Tsukiaki)

=== Television animation ===
- Moomin (1969) (Snorken)
- Tomorrow's Joe (1970) (Carlos Rivera)
- Andersen Monogatari (1971) (Ib)
- Star of the Giants (1971) (Nishioka)
- Tensai Bakabon (1971)
- Space Battleship Yamato Series (1974) (Mamoru Kodai)
- Vicky the Viking (1974) (Snope)
- La Seine no Hoshi (1975) (The Black Tulip, Narrator)
- Captain Future (1978) (Captain Future)
- Sherlock Hound (1984) (Holmes)
- Miracle Girls (1993) (Narrator)
- Soreike! Anpanman (1998) (Hamled)
- Mezzo DSA (2004) (Kenichi Kurokawa)

=== OVA ===
- Yamato 2520 (1995) (Narrator)

=== Theatrical animation ===
- Saint Seiya: Legend of Crimson Youth (1988) (Abel)
- Pokémon Heroes (2002) (Announcer)

=== Dub Work ===
==== Live-action ====
- Roger Moore
  - Live and Let Die (James Bond)
  - The Man with the Golden Gun (James Bond)
  - Shout at the Devil (1985 TBS edition) (Sebastian Oldsmith)
  - The Spy Who Loved Me (James Bond)
  - Moonraker (James Bond)
  - For Your Eyes Only (James Bond)
  - The Cannonball Run (Seymour Goldfarb, Jr.)
  - Octopussy (James Bond)
  - A View to a Kill (James Bond)
- Tony Curtis
  - Sweet Smell of Success (first time dubbing Curtis)
  - The Defiant Ones
  - Some Like It Hot
  - Spartacus
  - The Great Race
  - The Persuaders!
  - Vega$
- Robert Redford
  - Butch Cassidy and the Sundance Kid (Sundance Kid)
  - The Great Gatsby (Jay Gatsby)
  - All the President's Men (1980 TBS version) (Bob Woodward)
  - A Bridge Too Far (NTV version) (Julian Cook)
  - Legal Eagles (TV Tokyo version) (Tom Logan)
  - Spy Game (TV Tokyo version) (Nathan D. Muir)
- Dan Aykroyd
  - Trading Places
  - Ghostbusters
  - Dragnet
  - Ghostbusters II
- Michael Hui
  - The Private Eyes (Wong Yeuk Sze)
  - Rob-B-Hood (The Landlord)
- Batman (Batman (Adam West))
- Bean (Mr. Bean (Rowan Atkinson))
- Dracula: Prince of Darkness (Charles Kent (Francis Matthews))
- Face to Face (1977 TV Asahi edition) (Professor Brad Fletcher (Gian Maria Volonté))
- Frankenstein Created Woman (1970 TV Asahi edition) (Hans Werner (Robert Morris))
- The Italian Job (Charlie Croker (Michael Caine))
- Little Nicky (The Deacon (Quentin Tarantino))
- Monty Python's Flying Circus and The Holy Grail (Eric Idle)
- On Her Majesty's Secret Service (1979 TBS edition (James Bond (George Lazenby)))
- The Plague of the Zombies (Dr. Peter Tompson (Brook Williams))
- Seven Golden Men Strike Again (1975 TV Asahi edition) (Albert the Professor (Philippe Leroy))
- Splash (Dr. Walter Kornbluth (Eugene Levy))
- UFO (Commander Straker (Ed Bishop))
- Wild Wild West (2002 NTV edition) (Dr. Arliss Loveless (Kenneth Branagh))
- Young Frankenstein (Frederick Frankenstein (Gene Wilder))

==== Animation ====
- The New Adventures of Superman (Superman)
- Rocket Robin Hood (Rocket Robin Hood)
- Wacky Races (Kizatoto-kun (Peter Perfect))

=== Tokusatsu ===
- Juken Sentai Gekiranger (2007) (Voice of Confrontation Beast Pig-Fist Tabu)

=== Radio ===
- Otoko-tachi no yoru kana
- Edogawa Ranpo Series as Kogoro Akechi
- Hoshi e Iku fune
