= Kazuo Hayashi =

Japanese actor and voice actor

- Born: Kazuo Sugita; October 17, 1945 (age 80); Tokyo, Japan
- Occupations: Actor, voice actor
- Years active: 1969–2012

Kazuo Hayashi (林 一夫, Hayashi Kazuo; born October 17, 1945) is a Japanese actor and voice actor from Tokyo. He is affiliated with Theater Echo, and is skilled in Buyō.

== Roles ==
=== Television animation ===
- Ippotsu Kanta-kun (Kōzan)
- Space Runaway Ideon (Gije Zaral)
- Pokémon (Russell)
- Space Battleship Yamato II (Yasuo Nanbu)
- Space Battleship Yamato III (Yasuo Nanbu)
- Stellvia of the Universe (Tamotsu Kazamatsuri)
- Cardcaptor Sakura (Clow Reed)
- Saint Seiya (Hound Asterion)

=== OVA ===
- Legend of the Galactic Heroes (Horst Sinzer)

=== Dubbing roles ===
- Armageddon (Rockhound (Steve Buscemi))
- Prison Break (Brad Bellick (Wade Williams))
- There Will Be Blood (Fletcher Hamilton (Ciarán Hinds))
- West Side Story (1979 TBS edition) (Loco (Jaime Rogers))

=== Tokusatsu ===
- Kamen Rider Amazon (Spider Beastman (ep. 1), Snake Beastman (ep. 7), Diving Beetle Beastman (ep. 16))
- Kamen Rider Stronger (Kikkaijin Hasamigani(ep. 24) )
- Choudenshi Bioman (Bio Hunter Silva (ep. 37 - 49))
- Gekisou Sentai Carranger (SS Pamaan (ep. 24)/Zoku Red (ep. 24))
- Seijuu Sentai Gingaman (Sword General Budoh (eps. 1 - 24))
- Kyuukyuu Sentai GoGo-V (Computer Psyma Beast Cybergildo (ep. 14) )

=== Japanese Voice-Over ===
- Peter Pan's Flight (Nana)
