= Yōko Asagami =

Japanese voice actress (born 1952)

Harumi Ichiryūsai
- 一龍斎春水
- Ichiryūsai in 2023
- Born: Yōko Asagami; July 10, 1952 (age 74); Otaru, Hokkaido, Japan
- Occupations: Voice actress, kōdanshi
- Years active: 1972–present
- Agent: Aksent
- Notable credit(s): Yuki Mori in Space Battleship Yamato; Saeko Nogami in City Hunter
- Website: https://yokoharumi.com

Harumi Ichiryūsai (一龍斎 春水, Ichirūsai Harumi), previously known as Yōko Asagami (麻上 洋子, Asagami Yōko; born July 10, 1952) is a Japanese voice actress and kōdanshi who is represented by Aksent. She is most known for the roles of Yuki Mori (Space Battleship Yamato) and Saeko Nogami (City Hunter). Her married name is Yōko Ōkubo (大久保 洋子, Ōkubo Yōko).

Asagmi was born in Otaru, Hokkaidō. In 1952, she began to study traditional Japanese storytelling kōdan under the master. By 2004, she had risen to become a star kōdanshi. When she performs as a storyteller, she goes by the art name Harumi Ichiryūsai (一龍斎 春水). As of 2012, she currently does voiceover work under that name.

In 2022, she won the Merit Award at the 16th Seiyu Awards.

== Filmography ==
=== Television animation ===
1970s

- Space Battleship Yamato (1974) – Yuki Mori
- La Seine no Hoshi (1975) – Michelle
- Blocker Gundan 4 Machine Blaster (1976) – Yuka Hōjō
- Galaxy Express 999 (1978) – Claire, Kasumi
- Majokko Tickle (1978) – Tiko

1980s

- The Littl' Bits (1980) – Belfy, or "Lillabit" in the U.S. version
- Space Runaway Ideon (1980) – Harulu Ajiba
- Urusei Yatsura (1981) – Miki (ep. 39)
- Igano Kabamaru (1983) – Kaoru Nonogusa
- Sherlock Hound (1984) – Marie Hudson
- City Hunter (1987–88) – Saeko Nogami
- City Hunter 2 (1988–89) – Saeko Nogami
- City Hunter 3 (1989–90) – Saeko Nogami

1990s

- City Hunter '91 (1991) – Saeko Nogami
- Pretty Soldier Sailor Moon (1992) – Fraw (ep. 1)
- Thumbelina: A Magical Story (1992) – Mama
- City Hunter: The Secret Service (1996) – Saeko Nogami
- City Hunter: Goodbye My Sweetheart (1997) – Saeko Nogami
- Detective Conan (1998) – Yōko Asanuma
- City Hunter: Death of Vicious Criminal Ryo Saeba (1999) – Saeko Nogami
- Omishi Magical Theater: Risky Safety (1999) – Narrator, Adachi

2000s

- PaRappa The Rapper (2001) – Miss Stew (Ep.11)
- The Galaxy Railways (2003) – Layla Destiny Shura, Kanna Yuuki
- Angel Heart (2005) – Saeko Nogami
- Blue Drop (2007) – Shivariel, Blue AI
- Koihime Musō (2008) – Shibaki Suikyō

2010s

- Star Twinkle PreCure (2019) – Yōko Hoshina

=== Original video animation (OVA) ===
- Urotsukidoji (1987) – Akemi Ito
- Teito Monogatari (1991) – Keiko Mekata
- Yamato 2520 (1995) – Amesis
- Queen Emeraldas (1998) – Baraluda
- Yukikaze (2002) – Rydia Cooley

=== Films ===
- Space Battleship Yamato (1977) – Yuki Mori
- Farewell to Space Battleship Yamato (1978) – Yuki Mori
- Galaxy Express 999 series (1979–1981) – Claire, Metalmena
- Space Runaway Ideon: A Contact & Be Invoked (1982) – Harulu Ajiba
- Final Yamato (1983) – Yuki Mori
- City Hunter: .357 Magnum (1989) – Saeko Nogami
- City Hunter: Bay City Wars (1990) – Saeko Nogami
- City Hunter: Million Dollar Conspiracy (1990) – Saeko Nogami
- Doraemon: Nobita's Great Adventure in the South Seas (1998) – Rufin
- Okko's Inn (2018) – Mineko
- City Hunter The Movie: Shinjuku Private Eyes (2019) – Saeko Nogami
- City Hunter The Movie: Angel Dust (2023) – Saeko Nogami

=== Video games ===
- Ogre Battle: The March of the Black Queen (1996) – Norn
- Syphon Filter (1999) – Lian Xing
- Super Robot Wars Alpha Gaiden (2001) – Machiko Valencia
- Super Robot Wars Alpha 3 (2005) – Ajiba Harulu
- Super Robot Wars NEO (2009) – Machiko Valencia
- World of Final Fantasy (2016) – Princess Sarah

=== Dubbing ===
- 1941 – Betty Douglas (Dianne Kay)
- The Amazing Spider-Man – Aunt May (Sally Field)
- The Amazing Spider-Man 2 – Aunt May (Sally Field)
- The Big Brawl – Nancy (Kristine DeBell)
- Cats & Dogs – Mrs. Caroline Brody (Elizabeth Perkins)
- Death on the Nile – Mrs. Bowers (Dawn French)
- Four Christmases – Marilyn (Mary Steenburgen)
- Legally Blonde 2: Red, White & Blonde – Representative Victoria Rudd (Sally Field)
- The Man from Hong Kong – Angelica Pearson (Rebecca Gilling)
- The Namesake – Ashima Ganguli (Tabu)
- Nicky Larson and Cupid's Perfume – Hélène Lamberti (Sophie Mousel)
- On Her Majesty's Secret Service (1979 TBS edition) – Olympe (Virginia North)
- Police Story 2 – May (Maggie Cheung)
- Pushing Daisies – Vivian Charles (Ellen Greene)
- The Reincarnation of Peter Proud – Ann Curtis (Jennifer O'Neill)
- West Side Story (1979 TBS edition) – Rosalia (Suzie Kaye)

== Accolades ==
- Merit Award at the 16th Seiyu Awards (2022)
