= Buona Sera, Mrs. Campbell =

1968 film by Melvin Frank

- Original poster
- Directed by: Melvin Frank
- Written by: Melvin Frank; Denis Norden; Sheldon Keller
- Produced by: Melvin Frank
- Starring: Gina Lollobrigida; Shelley Winters; Phil Silvers; Peter Lawford; Telly Savalas; Lee Grant; Janet Margolin; Marian Moses; Philippe Leroy
- Cinematography: Gabor Pogany
- Edited by: Bill Butler
- Music by: Riz Ortolani (music composed and conducted by)
- Production companies: A Melvin Frank Film; Connaught Productions, Inc.
- Distributed by: United Artists
- Release date: December 1968
- Running time: 108 minutes
- Country: United States
- Language: English
- Box office: $2.5 million (US/ Canada rentals)

Buona Sera, Mrs. Campbell is a 1968 American comedy film starring Gina Lollobrigida, Shelley Winters, Phil Silvers, Peter Lawford and Telly Savalas. It was produced and directed by Melvin Frank, who co-wrote the original screenplay with Denis Norden and Sheldon Keller.

The United Artists release was filmed at Cinecittà Studios in Rome. It served as the basis for the unsuccessful 1979 stage musical Carmelina. Some critics have also speculated that the 1999 stage musical Mamma Mia!—and, by extension, its 2008 film adaptation—are based on Buona Sera, Mrs. Campbell, although the musical's book writer, Catherine Johnson, has denied any connection. The Dutch hit song Als de zon schijnt by André van Duin is a cover version of the theme song of this film.

== Plot ==
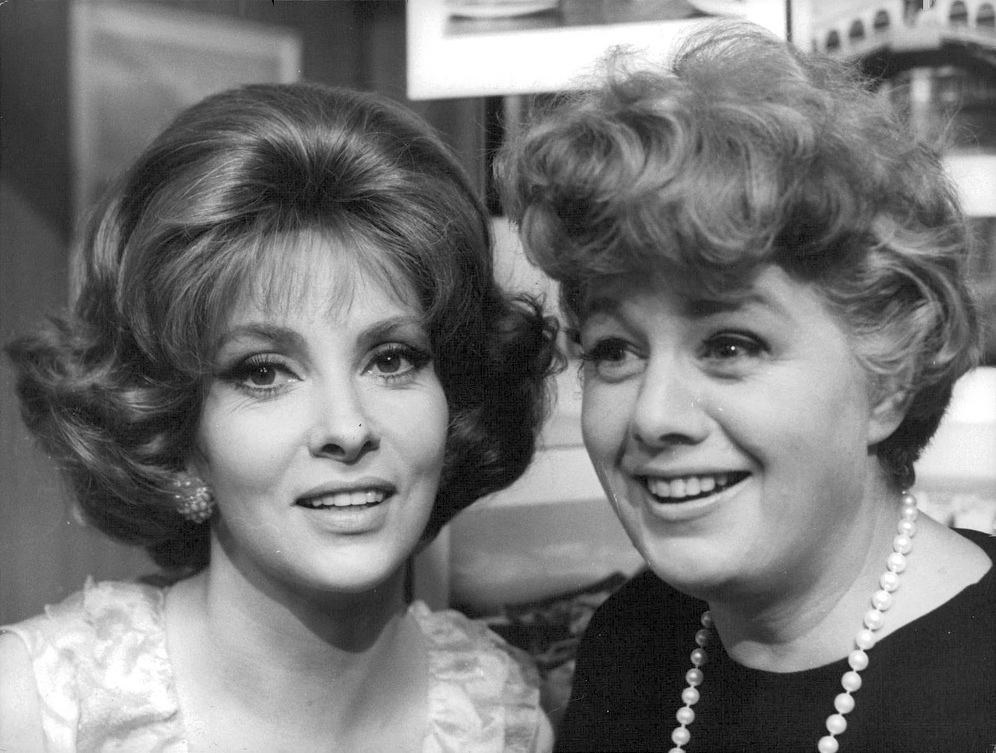
Gina Lollobrigida and Shelley Winters as Carla Campbell and Shirley Newman.

During the WWII American occupation of Italy, American GIs are quartered in the homes of town residents in the village of San Forino, and recently orphaned Carla "Campbell" quarters at her small home one airman at a time. The 16-year old Carla seeks comfort and sleeps with each of the three American GIs quartered alone with her in the course of 10 days: Cpl. Phil Newman, Lt. Justin Young, and Sgt. Walter Braddock. After each, in turn, moves on, Carla discovers herself pregnant. Uncertain of which is the father, Carla writes to each of the three, who are unaware of the existence of the other two, to support "his" daughter, Gia, with monthly financial payments. Over the next 20 years, Carla shrewdly invests the funds, buying a wine vineyard that she runs with the help of her handsome manager, Vittorio, and in time sends Gia to an American boarding school in Switzerland.

To protect her reputation, as well as the reputation of her child, Carla has raised the girl to believe her mother is the widow of a nonexistent army captain named Eddie Campbell, a name she borrowed from a can of soup (otherwise he would have been Captain Coca-Cola, the only other term in English she knew at the time). As the widow of Captain Campbell, Carla gains social prominence in the community that would have shunned her as an unwed mother. The only individual in the community who does not pay her deference is the Contessa, a social rival.

Twenty years after the end of World War II, the three ex-airmen who quartered with Carla attend a unit-wide reunion of the 293rd Squadron of the 15th Air Force in the village where they were stationed. The men are accompanied by their wives, and in the Newmans' case, three obnoxious children. Carla is forced into a series of comic situations as she tries to keep the "three fathers"—each one anxious to meet his daughter Gia for the first time—from discovering her secret. At the same time, Carla strives to convince Gia not to run off to Paris to be with a much older married man who will take her to Brazil. Vittorio, Carla's long-time companion, also must adjust to the unraveling situation, setting aside his ego to emotionally support Carla and Gia through the crisis.

Meanwhile, Gia is anxious to learn more from the veterans at the reunion about her nonexistent father, Captain Eddie Campbell, while Carla tries to assure her that people's memories are short. The wives of Newman, Young, and Braddock meet Carla and Gia at the local beauty parlor. Moved by Gia's account of her father's connection to the squadron, they advocate for a memorial chapel to be named after the gallant Capt. Campbell. Eventually the "three fathers" and their wives stumble on the truth when Carla's housekeeper inadvertently informs them, mistakenly assuming that the three men who come to see Carla together have learned the truth.

When confronted, Mrs. Campbell admits she does not know which of the three men is Gia's father. She challenges the men by asking them what kind of father each would have been, particularly because they have never been there for all the small but important life events of their daughter. Provoked by this, the potential fathers talk to Gia and insist that she cannot run off. Vittorio also helps Gia understand her mother's motivations for deception to protect her child and herself.

At the town's dedication ceremony for the chapel, Carla says that Eddie Campbell would have been too humble to accept the honor and insists that her social rival, the Contessa, accept the dedication of the chapel in the name of the people of San Fiorino.

The "fathers" cease the support payments, and the Braddocks, who cannot have children of their own, agree to have Gia stay with them while she attends college in the US. Vittorio stays on with Carla after she convinces him that he will be her sole romantic interest and business partner.

== Cast ==
- Gina Lollobrigida as Carla Campbell
- Shelley Winters as Shirley Newman
- Phil Silvers as Phil Newman
- Peter Lawford as Justin Young
- Telly Savalas as Walter Braddock
- Lee Grant as Fritzie Braddock
- Janet Margolin as Gia Campbell
- Philippe Leroy as Vittorio
- Marian Moses as Lauren Young
- Naomi Stevens as Rosa
- Renzo Palmer as the Mayor
- Giovanna Galletti as the Contessa
- James Mishler as Stubby
- Dale Cummings as Pete

== Musical score ==
A soundtrack album was released by United Artists Records.

- "Buona Sera" (title song)
  - Sung by Jimmy Roselli
  - Music by Riz Ortolani
  - Lyrics by Melvin Frank
- "San Forino March"
  - Music and lyrics by Andrew Frank
- "The Army Air Corps Song"
  - Music by Robert MacArthur Crawford
- "In the Mood"
  - Written by Joe Garland and Andy Razaf
- "Moonlight Serenade"
  - Music by Glenn Miller

=== Recordings ===
The title song was also later recorded by Jimmy Roselli, and in 1969 it charted #38 on the AC chart, where it stayed for 4 weeks. It was his last ever charting single.

== Critical response ==
In his review in the Chicago Sun-Times, Roger Ebert described the film as "a charming reminder of what movie comedies used to be like...It depends on the traditional strong points of movie comedy: well-defined situation, good dialog, emphasis on characters...director Melvin Frank holds the story together and makes it work. A lot of the credit goes to the real comic ability of Telly Savalas (the best of the three would-be fathers) and Shelley Winters, who plays Phil Silvers' wife. Miss Lollobrigida is good, too, projecting the kind of innocence that is necessary if the situation isn't going to seem vulgar."

In The New York Times, Howard Thompson wrote "This overcooked, hardbreathing frolic, which gets off to a bright start, eventually collapses in the category of impossible comedies, sniggeringly pegged to sex...the reasonable taste, the bounce and the logic all start floundering about midpoint, with everyone running wildly to catch up, including poor Miss Lollobrigida, who bears the brunt of the confusion and the redundant contrivances. Suddenly it's gags, gags and more gags, to no avail, until the plot peg of authentic paternity begins to sound like a tired, old burlesque joke. The finale is as dull as the opening chapter is sprightly."

== Awards and nominations ==
- Golden Globe Award for Best Actress in a Motion Picture – Musical or Comedy (Gina Lollobrigida) – nominated
- Golden Globe Award for Best Original Song ("Buona Sera, Mrs. Campbell") – nominated
- Writers Guild of America Award for Best Original Screenplay – nominated
- David di Donatello for Best Actress (Gina Lollobrigida), winner

== See also ==
- List of American films of 1968
