= Carmelina =

1979 musical

- Original Cast Recording
- Music: Burton Lane
- Lyrics: Alan Jay Lerner
- Book: Joseph Stein; Alan Jay Lerner
- Basis: Film Buona Sera, Mrs. Campbell
- Productions: 1979 Broadway

Carmelina is a musical with a book by Joseph Stein and Alan Jay Lerner, lyrics by Lerner, and music by Burton Lane.

== Synopsis ==
Based on the 1968 film Buona Sera, Mrs. Campbell, it focuses on an Italian woman who has raised her teenaged daughter Gia to believe her father was an American who died heroically in World War II. Supposedly she spurns the constant advances of local café owner Vittorio because her heart still belongs to the man she tragically lost. In reality, she had affairs with three different GIs and has no idea who fathered the girl. Trouble ensues when the three veterans decide to reunite in Carmelina's small hometown.

=== Similarity to Mamma Mia ===
Early reviewers of the jukebox musical Mamma Mia!, which opened twenty years after Carmelina in 1999, noted similarities of the plot to both Carmelina and Buona Sera, Mrs. Campbell (the film that was source material for Carmelina). Critic John Simon speculated that Mamma Mia! is set in Greece and not Italy (which might have fit in better with the musical's title) to make the connection to the film less obvious. However, the book-writer of Mamma Mia, Catherine Johnson, has denied being inspired by Buona Sera, Mrs. Campbell.

== Production history ==
After eleven previews, the Broadway production, directed by José Ferrer and choreographed by Peter Gennaro, opened on April 8, 1979 at the St. James Theatre, where it ran for only seventeen performances. The cast included Georgia Brown, Cesare Siepi, Grace Keagy, John Michael King, Gordon Ramsey, and Josie de Guzman.

A cast recording was released in 1980 on the Original Cast label, which specialises in preserving musicals that might not otherwise be recorded. Co-produced by Bruce and Doris Yeko, the LP was made with the participation of original Broadway cast members Georgia Brown, Josie de Guzman, Grace Keagy, Gordon Ramsey and Howard Ross. Original leading actor Cesare Siepi declined to participate in the project, so his role on the recording was filled by Paul Sorvino.

The York Theatre mounted a production of Carmelina in October 2006 for its Musicals in Mufti series. Marla Schaffel, who had recently been nominated for a Tony Award for her role in Jane Eyre, starred in the titular role. It was staged again in 2019 by the York Theatre Company for the Musicals in Mufti series with Andréa Burns as the lead.

== Critical reception ==
A nomination for Best Original Score was its sole recognition from the Tony Awards committee. In addition, Grace Keagy earned a Drama Desk Award nomination of Outstanding Featured Actress in a Musical.

== Song list ==
Act I

- It's Time for a Love Song
- Why Him?
- I Must Have Her
- Someone in April
- Signora Campbell
- Love Before Breakfast
- Yankee Doodles Are Coming to Town
- One More Walk Around the Garden
- All That He'd Want Me To Be
- It's Time for a Love Song (Reprise)

Act II

- Carmelina
- The Image of Me
- I'm a Woman
- The Image of You
- It's Time for a Love Song (Reprise)

== See also ==
- Mamma Mia, another Broadway musical about a woman with three potential fathers
