= Gordon Ramsey =

American actor and singer (1930–1993)

- Ramsey appearing on What's My Line?
- Born: June 19, 1930; Minneapolis, Minnesota, U.S.
- Died: November 5, 1993 (aged 63); Grymes Hill, Staten Island, U.S.
- Occupations: Actor, singer
- Years active: 1958–1993
- Spouse: Barbra Ramsey
- Children: 3
- Relatives: Anne Ramsey (Cousin)

Gordon Ramsey (June 19, 1930 – November 5, 1993) was an American actor and singer, who was based in New York City. He was in the original cast of the 1979 Broadway musical Carmelina and the 1978 film If Ever I See You Again.

== Early life and education ==
Ramsey was born in Minneapolis, Minnesota on June 19, 1930. He earned a Bachelor's Degree in Drama from Hamline University and served in the Army in the Korean War. While still in Minnesota, he joined the Minneapolis Theater Company.

== Career ==
After moving to New York in 1958, Ramsey made his acting debut in the Off-Broadway theater musical, The Man Who Never Died. In 1966, Ramsey played the role Lew in Autumn's Here at the Bert Wheeler Theatre, an off-Broadway play production.

Ramsey played the role of Bozo the Clown on television for two and a half years. In a 1969 episode of the TV show What's My Line?, Ramsey appeared as Bozo the Clown as a Mystery Guest. Later in the same episode, Ramsey appeared as himself without the clown makeup, requiring the panel to guess his line, which celebrity panelist Phyllis Newman did.

In 1976, Gordon and his wife Barbara were selected to emcee a benefit cruise for the Snug Harbor Cultural Center A few years later, he appeared in the 1979 Broadway musical Carmelina, which ran for 11 previews and 17 performances at the St. James Theatre in March and April 1979. He was also in the earlier pre-Broadway tryout of the show at the Kennedy Center in Washington, D.C. He reprised his role as Walter Braddock on the show's original cast recording.

Some of his other notable performances included hosting a local children's television show as "Bozo the Clown" and voicing characters in the animated series Star Blazers. He often performed in the "Lyrics and Lyricists" series in Manhattan.

== Personal life ==
He had four children – Elyssa, Gordon ("Gordie"), Joanna, and Donna – with his wife Barbara Ramsey (née Brown). Gordon, Barbara, and their eldest three children were all, at one point, working members of the Screen Actors Guild (SAG). Barbara, originally from Texas, was a dancer who appeared off Broadway, in television, and in films, in addition to frequent commercials. The family of five appeared in commercials as a group twice – once for Eastern Air Lines, and one for a milk product. The family lived on Grymes Hill close to Stapleton in Staten Island.

A 1973 feature in the Staten Island Advance described Ramsey as a "strong, handsome Iowa boy of hybrid ethnic origins."

== Death ==
Ramsey died at his home in Grymes Hill, Staten Island on November 5, 1993, of cancer, at the age of 63.

== Acting credits ==
=== Theater ===
| Year | Title | Role | Notes |
|---|---|---|---|
| 1958 | The Man Who Never Died | | Off-Broadway |
| 1966 | Autumn's Here | Lew | Off-Broadway |
| 1979 | Carmelina | Walter Braddock | Kennedy Center |
| 1979 | Carmelina | Walter Braddock | Broadway |

=== Film ===
| Year | Title | Role | Notes |
|---|---|---|---|
| 1978 | If Ever I See You Again | Larry Brookman | |
| 1987 | A Return to Salem's Lot | Allen | |

=== Television ===
| Year | Title | Role | Notes |
|---|---|---|---|
| 1969 | What's My Line? | Bozo the Clown / Himself | One episode |
| 1979 | Star Blazers | Orion Sr., Captain Avatar | 52 episodes |
| 1979 | 3 by Cheever | Joe Parminter | TV miniseries, episode "O Youth and Beauty!" |
