= List of Space Battleship Yamato characters =

This list of Space Battleship Yamato characters is a list, with biographical details, of major characters appearing in the anime series Space Battleship Yamato and its American dubbed version, Star Blazers, as well as the 2010 live-action film remake. Not all the American voice artists are known for the first two seasons (owing to their non-union status they were not credited in the shows' closing titles), and a different group of actors provided voices in the third season.

== Yamato crew ==
=== First season ===
- Captain Jūzō Okita (沖田 十三, Okita Jūzō) (Captain Abraham Avatar): The stern captain of the Yamato, utterly devoted to his mission to save Earth from the Garmillas threat, even at the cost of his own life. Before becoming a captain of the UNCF he was a famous captain, star of a popular fish brand called Findus, but, after the declaration of war against the Garmillas he joined the United Nation Space Fleet. He is in fact dying, and becomes increasingly ill during the course of the first season, but remains convinced that he will live to see his home world again. He regards Susumu Kodai almost as a replacement for the son he lost in battle, and sorely regrets his son's death in battle at Pluto, along with the apparent death of Kodai's older brother, Mamoru. Even when his illness leaves him bedridden, he remains a source of advice to the crew, and to Kodai in particular. In the movie Final Yamato, it is revealed that he was kept in cryogenic suspension for some time until the Earth physicians could revive him and cure his sickness. He then went on to lead the Star Force again in its fight against the Deingillians. In the English edition, it was revealed that he was revived from death by residual energy from the Cosmo DNA's cleansing of Earth, but was bereft of nearly all of his memories as a result. He was kept in hiding by Doctor Sane until later in the series. In Final Yamato it became partially true, as he was shown to be held into a cryogenic sleep to be cured from his otherwise fatal disease.

In Space Battleship Yamato 2199 Admiral Okita is revealed to have been a senior naval commander for some time having led a United Nations fleet in a war with human colonists of Mars before headquarters got him suspended from his command after he refused an order to fire upon the Garmillans at their first encounter at Pluto, and ordered forward commander Commander Daigo Shima instead to do it. This results in the Garmillans fighting until near Mars, where Okita engineers a costly victory which included the death of his son who was also a naval officer. Garmillas pulls back to their base on Pluto and intensify their bombardment of Earth with irradiated asteroids. Okita leads an assault on the Pluto base, where his fleet was decimated by a far superior force, but managed to distract the Garmillans from noticing the arrival of a ship from the distant planet of Iscandar piloted by Princess Sasha, who perished while delivering the warp core that powered up Okita's new battleship, the Yamato. Okita is known for his aggressive head-on tactics, and it saw the Yamato through several battles. He also uses terrain with his ferocity to his advantage, frequently upsetting opponents with unexpected tactics. He would also be diplomatic when called for, making alliances more than once with Garmillans when necessary. He formed a bond with Susumu Kodai, reminding him strongly of his elder brother Mamoru whom he had mentored. He encouraged Kodai to think independently, giving Kodai the confidence to disobey orders. During the course of the series he had to contend with his illness, which caused him to collapse a few times, one of which required emergency surgery while battling the dimensional submarine at a protoplanet; but he even overrode the objections of his friend and immediate superior Admiral Hijikata before the voyage, just to be on it. He led the ship all the way to the Garmillan homeworld (revealed to be Iscandar's twin planet), smashing their way to the heart of the empire at Dessler's palace. Okita then chose to use the Wave Motion Gun to save the people of the Garmillan capital Baleras when Dessler attempted to sacrifice it just to destroy the Yamato. Okita was unable to leave the ship upon arriving at Iscandar, and became increasingly bedridden on the return journey, even during their encounter with the Celestial Ark and a Gatlantean expeditionary force and a final confrontation with Dessler within the warp gate dimension. Okita died as the Yamato came into Earth orbit having achieved his mission and seeing his home planet again, his spirit being captured by the Cosmo Reverse System, left vacant by Mamoru Kodai's spirit when he prematurely activated the system. Thus it was Okita's spirit and memories that directed the Cosmo Reverse System's restoration of Earth to a healthy world.

The character is modelled on Leiji Matsumoto's father. and the characters names is based on the Japanese science fiction writer Unno Juza and Okita Sōji.

- Japanese voice artist: Gorō Naya (original), Takayuki Sugō (2199)
- American voice artist: Gordon Ramsey (original), Brian Mathis (2199)
- Live-action actor: Tsutomu Yamazaki

- Susumu Kodai (古代 進, Kodai Susumu) (Derek Wildstar, also known as Jason Kodai in the English dub of the first Yamato movie): A young orphan, it was the death of his parents during a Garmillas planet bomb attack on the Miura Peninsula that drove him to follow in his older brother Mamoru's footsteps and join the Earth Defense Force. He is initially hot-headed and prone to bursts of anger, and at first blames Captain Okita for the death of his brother in battle. However, he matures during the first season thanks to his responsibility as the Yamato's battle chief, and ultimately Okita nominates him acting captain when he is unable to continue. Kodai continues commanding the Yamato and its crew for most of the rest of the franchise (although he is not formally promoted to captain until Yamato III), only relinquishing command twice: to Yamanami in Be Forever Yamato, and to a revived Okita during Final Yamato. He is also a talented pilot, flying his own Cosmo Zero fighter as the leader of the Black Tigers, and in the second season frequently joining the Cosmo Tigers in battle. His Japanese given name means "to go forward, to improve". He remains the lead character throughout the original timeline serving as the Yamato's commander until Final Yamato when a revived Okita retakes command. He retires from the military afterwards, joining the merchant fleet raising a daughter with Yuki Mori although the relationships become estranged as he spend more time away from Earth. Sanada recalls Kodai to command a rebuilt Yamato in Resurrection after Mori's ship goes missing. In the 2010 live-action film, his story begins as a scavenger who left the Earth Defense Force five years prior. He blamed himself for redirecting a Garmillas bomb toward a space station, killing his parents and Daisuke Shima's wife. He re-enlists prior to the launching of the Yamato as the ship's gunner before eventually being promoted by Okita as acting captain. Though the Yamato succeeds in retrieving the means to restore Earth's surface, the remaining Garmillas ship cripples it before preparing a missile to destroy the planet. After ordering all surviving crew to abandon ship, Kodai sacrifices himself and the ship to destroy the missile and save Earth.

In the 2199 series Kodai is depicted as a young, freshly graduated cadet officer and is promoted suddenly to command the tactical division of the Yamato when most of the junior officers are killed by Garmillas aircraft bombs immediately prior to boarding the Yamato. He matures quickly as one of the bridge crew on the Yamato and is the first to fire the Wave Motion Gun. After an initial confrontation with Okita over his brother's death, he forms a bond with him, who was his brother Mamoru's former mentor. Okita encourages Kodai's independent streak and he takes on Okita's aggressive tendencies in battle tactics, most notably disobeying Sanada's orders and developing anti-submarine tactics during their first confrontation with the Garmillan dimensional submarine. He and Operations Officer Yuki Mori become romantic partners over the course of the series and become engaged before the start of the 2202: Warriors of Love series. After the Yamato crew are summoned to Telezart by Teresa, Kodai gather the crew to rebel against the Cosmo Navy and steal the Yamato from dry dock where the ship had been rebuilt. Sanada gives Kodai command of the Yamato, noting that Kodai is a leader where he is not. Kodai struggles with command as he is still in his mid-twenties and placed under great strain which is only relieved when Admiral Hijikata accepts Kodai's offer of command as the ship approaches Telezart. Later when Yamato crashes onto Zemuria, Kodai is one of the few left behind when the crew abandons ship and is devastated when Mori loses her memories of their time together. Kodai offers his life to end the conflict during a confrontation with Dessler and Mir but Mori takes the shot intended for Kodai. After the Yamato is rebuilt it becomes the spearhead of the final assault on the Comet Empire. Hijikata is killed during the assault and Kodai takes command, storming Emperor Zworder's throne room with Yamamato and the Marines. Surviving this personal encounter with Zworder, Yamato is abandoned once again. Kodai and Mori use the Yamato's failing wave motion engine to destroy the Ark of Destruction and Zworder. Months later the Yamato reappears within the time-displaced Time Vault. The missing Yamato is found on board revealing Kodai and Mori are alive within the higher dimensions. Kodai feels no desire to rejoin humanity and is seemingly willing to walk aimlessly in eternity and Mori is unable to convince him to return until, the potential future of having a child with Mori is revealed. As Kodai and Mori reconcile by having regained a sense of responsibility to life, a refurbished Yamato arrives, penetrating this dimension and retrieving Kodai and Mori and returning them to Earth.
- Japanese voice artist: Kei Tomiyama, Kōichi Yamadera (PlayStation 2 games, Rebirth), Daisuke Ono (2199)
- American voice artist: Kenneth Meseroll (seasons 1 & 2), John Bellucci (season 3), Christopher Wehkamp (2199)
- Live-action actor: Takuya Kimura

- Mamoru Kodai (古代 守, Kodai Mamoru) (Alex Wildstar, also known as Alex Kodai in the English dub of the first Yamato movie): The older Kodai/Wildstar brother and captain of Missile Ship 17, the Yukikaze (Paladin in Star Blazers), Mamoru appears to die in the first episode while holding off enemies so Okita's stricken flagship may escape the battlefield. In the original, Mamoru was insisting he could not face the souls of his dead comrades if he fled whereas in Star Blazers he dies for the sole purpose of providing cover for Okita's ship. In fact, it emerged his ship had crash-landed—in one piece—on Titan, and he had been captured alive by the Garmillans, but the ship in which he was a prisoner crashed on Iscandar, where Queen Starsha healed him. He fell in love with his rescuer and decided to stay on Iscandar, fathering a daughter named Sasha. His Japanese given name means "to protect". He sacrificed his life in Be Forever, Yamato in order to save Admiral Heikuro Todo from execution.
  The character of Mamoru Kodai was originally planned to have appeared midway through the series as a scarred space pirate under the guise of Captain Harlock. When the series' episode count was cut, these plans had to be scrapped and his storyline was quickly wrapped up with his appearance on Iscandar. However, this space pirate angle still remains in Leiji Matsumoto's Space Battleship Yamato manga.

In 2199 Kodai is best friends with Shiro Sanada in college and is in a relationship with Sanada's research partner Kaoru Niimi in the early stages of the war. By 2199 Mamoru Kodai has risen to rank of Lieutenant Commander and captains the missile destroyer Yukikaze when as the only other ship surviving the battle of Pluto he sacrifices himself and his ship to cover the retreat of the Kirishima, Earth's last battleship. He survives the ship's crash into the Saturnian moon Enceladus and is captured by Garmillan forces and sent as a biological sample of Earth to the homeworld when the destroyer crashes at Iscandar. Queen Starsha hides him from the Garmillans who recover the wrecked warship. He lives on for a few months with Starsha developing a close friendship while being the only two people on the planet but eventually succumbs to his wounds, leaving behind a message for the Earth ship approaching Iscandar and his brother Susumu. Starsha recovers Mamoru's spirit within the Cosmo Reverse Device which will restore the Earth. Mamoru, watching his brother's grief over the death of Yuki Mori and sensing Captain Okita's death, charges the Cosmo Reverse Device and revives Mori, leaving the Device dead until it captures Okita's departing spirit, re-initialising the system for use in restoring Earth.
- Japanese voice artist: Taichirō Hirokawa (Original), Mitsuru Miyamoto (2199)
- American voice artist: Z Charles Bolton (2199)
- Live-action actor: Shinichi Tsutsumi

- Yuki Mori (森 雪, Mori Yuki) (Nova Forrester): Initially Dr. Sado's nurse, Yuki gained the additional responsibilities aboard Yamato such as operating the radar, performing computer calculations, taking care of the crew's morale and, along with Kaoru Niimi, searching planets for food sources. She is from the outset attracted to Susumu, but conceals her true feelings with girlish glee. As the only significant female crew member, she was occasionally the subject of fan service in the form of skirt-flippings by Analyzer, though only in early episodes before the tone of the series becomes generally more serious. Her Japanese name means "forest snow", creator Matsumoto being fond of female characters with "Yuki" (snow) as part of their name. She serves faithfully aboard the Yamato throughout the series run and finally is married to Susumu Kodai at the conclusion of Final Yamato. She and Kodai raise a daughter Miyuki who becomes a vet nurse working with Dr. Sado. Mori rises to the rank of Captain and is commander of a vessel supporting the Earth Federation battleship Blue Noah when the ship goes missing at the start of Resurrection. It is implied that she survive but, with the two planned sequel films cancelled, her ultimate fate is uncertain. In the 2010 live-action film, Yuki is an Earth Defense Force ace pilot who initially is at odds with Susumu, even after he saves her when debris from a destroyed Garmillas ship cripples her Cosmo Tiger fighter and ruptures her oxygen supply. Upon arriving at Iscandar/Garmillas, her body becomes the host of Iscandar's power to restore Earth's atmosphere.

In 2199 Mori is a staff officer at UN Cosmo Force headquarters serving under Admiral Hijikata, who has been her guardian since her parents were killed in a car crash which also gave her amnesia. It is later revealed she had been acting as a guide to Princess Yurisha of Iscandar, who had brought plans for the faster-than-light Wave Motion Engine. She was assigned to the Yamato as the Operations Officer and is in charge of the radar on the ship's bridge. She often clashes with Kodai, though the two develop a mutual attraction as Kodai quickly adjusts to his role as Tactical Officer. She, mistaken for Yurisha, is kidnapped from the Yamato by Garmillan operatives and brought to the heart of the Garmillan empire by Dessler, who uses her as a hostage against Queen Starsha. She plays along although Dessler knows who she really is. She eventually manages to sabotage the engine of Dessler's ship before being ejected from the ship by her Zaltzi guard, eventually reuniting her with Kodai and the Yamato. Dessler's personal guards shot her when he boarded the Yamato, and despite Dr. Sado's efforts, dies just as the Earth ship reaches the solar system a few weeks later; but is restored to life by the Cosmo Reverse Device.

By the start of 2202: Warriors of Love Mori and Kodai are engaged and she is again working at UNCF headquarters. Mori breaks off her engagement to Kodai when he insists she remain behind on Earth when the Yamato veterans re-unite to steal the ship for the journey to Telezart. She embarks with the crew in hiding and becomes a nurse until Kodai encounters her. She then returns to her former role as Operations Officer and radar operator and reconciles with Kodai. Mori receives a head injury attempting to save Toko Katsuragi/Sabera during Yamato's crash onto Zemuria and regains her lost pre-2199 memories at the cost of all memories since, losing all connection with Kodai. Despite losing memories of Kodai she takes a bullet intended for Kodai fired by Mir during Kodai and Keyman's confrontation with Dessler and Mir. Subsequently Mori stays behind on the Yamato when it is abandoned a second time, joining Kodai on the bridge, sensing a connection with him and a purpose that Earth can still be saved. When the wave motion engine chambers fails the Yamato falls into another dimension. Mori regains all her memories in this new space and seeks out Kodai, finding him having lost all will to live. A vision of a child Kodai and Mori might have together rekindles their commitment to life and each other as the Yamato with all her crew on board arrives to rescue them.

- Japanese voice artist: Yōko Asagami, Noriko Yume (Yamato Rebirth), Houko Kuwashima (2199)
- American voice artist: Amy Howard Wilson (seasons 1 & 2), Corinne Orr (season 3), Mallorie Rodak (2199)
- Live-action actress: Meisa Kuroki

- Daisuke Shima (島 大介, Shima Daisuke) (Mark Venture, also known as Shane O'Toole in the English dub of the first Yamato movie): A quieter and more level-headed complement to his best friend Kodai, Shima becomes chief navigator and helmsman of the Yamato. He suffers from a lack of self-confidence in his ability to control the mighty vessel, despite skillfully saving it on many occasions. Shima and Kodai have frequent arguments in the first series, some of which escalated into physical brawls, but the end results only made their friendship stronger. In the second season, he falls in love with Teresa (Trelaina) of Telezart by interstellar radio, and is heartbroken when she elects to remain on her world in the face of the Comet Empire, though he vows to carry on the fight in her name. He was blown into space by Garmillas troops but was rescued and revived by Teresa. He loses his life in the line of duty in Final Yamato. In the 2010 live-action film, Shima is a widower, having lost his pregnant wife in the first year of the war after a Garmillas missile destroyed the space station where she had lived. Their son was saved, but was rendered mute.

In 2199, like Kodai, he begins the series as a freshly graduated cadet officer and is suddenly promoted to command the Navigation division aboard the Yamato and acts as the ship's helmsman. He and Kodai remain close friends despite several disputes. Shima is recruited by Kaoru Niimi and Shinya Ito, members of a faction whose plans were scrapped by the Yamato's launch, to mutiny and return home with the plan to abandon Earth and resettle the human population on Beemela 4. Ito installs Shima as commander with the intention of killing Okita and Sanada and leaving Kodai behind on Beemela 4. Shima is instrumental in dismantling that mutiny as he is recruited by Ito's deputy Toru Hoshina, who himself was planted aboard the ship by Director Todo as an undercover investigator, aware that there might be rebels aboard the ship planning to sabotage the mission to Iscandar.

In the sequel series 2202: Warriors of Love Shima has left the military and is captain of a transport ship when he receives the call from Teresa of Telezart. He is reluctant to commit to Kodai's plan to steal the Yamato and only boards the ship as it appears the plan will succeed. Shima is restored to the helm and pilots the Yamato to Telezart and back, abandoning the ship after the engine failed during the Battle of Saturn and it crashes into Zemuria. Shima joins the rescued crew aboard the Ginga, taking the helm again. Shima with Sanada and the other Yamato survivors convinces Captain Todo to abandon plans for Ginga to flee Earth as a gene bank to re-establish humanity on another world and recommit to the battle to save Earth. Shima reboards the repaired Yamato for the final battle against the Ark of Destruction and subsequently is forced to abandon Yamato again and is distressed to see Kodai still on the bridge as the shuttles depart. With the war over, Shima, with Sanada and Captains Yamanami and Todo seek to convince military command to use Yamato to rescue Kodai and Mori.

- Japanese voice artist: Shūsei Nakamura, Isao Sasaki (Final Yamato), Hideyuki Tanaka (PlayStation 2 games), Kenichi Suzumura (2199)
- American voice artist: Tom Tweedy (seasons 1 & 2), Peter Fernandez (season 3), Ricco Fajardo (2199)
- Live-action actor: Naoto Ogata

- Jiro Shima (島 次郎, Shima Jirō) (Jordy Venture): Shima's pre-pubescent younger brother who remains on Earth during the series. He remains confident in the ability of Yamato to save the world, particularly with his older brother at the helm, and even in the face of public doubt. His Japanese given name means "second son". He re-appears in Resurrection as a Cosmo Navy officer working as adjutant to Admiral Sanada.
  - Japanese voice artist: Junko Sakata (season 1), Noriko Ohara (season 2), Chika Sakamoto (Final), Ryōtarō Okiayu (Rebirth)
- Shiro Sanada (真田志郎, Sanada Shirō) (Stephen Sandor): The science officer aboard Yamato, Sanada is earnest and dedicated, his ideas frequently saving the ship from destruction. His limbs are bionic, the result of a childhood accident which claimed the life of his sister and left him bitterly resentful of science's arrogance. He was a classmate of Mamoru Kodai, and blames himself for not having repaired the Yukikaze properly before it went into battle. When Susumu Kodai becomes acting captain, Sanada is frequently a source of advice. Sanada is the elder spokesperson for the crew after the deaths of Okita and Engineer Tokugawa. Along with Kodai, Mori and Sado he is a rare survivor all the way to the end of the original series in Resurrection where he has risen to a command rank in the military. In the 2010 live-action film, Sanada sacrifices his life while detonating a bomb that destroys the Garmillas power supply on the planet Iscandar/Garmillas.

In 2199, Sanada is often seen with an anthology of Chūya Nakahara's poems, a gift from Mamoru. The "bionic limbs" subplot was removed, and is depicted as having been Mamoru Kodai's closest friend from school. He is a scientist having been pivotal in adapting Wave Motion Energy to the Yamato and developing the Wave Motion Gun independently from Iscandarian science. He is older than most of the bridge officers and serves as the Yamato's executive officer as leader of the Technology division, taking command during Okita's bouts of illness. He eventually confides to Kodai his guilt over not warning Mamoru Kodai of the dangers of the battle of Pluto and how it was only being fought to cover the secret arrival of Princess Sasha's arrival on earth with the Yamato's warp core. Sanada was intending at the time to sacrifice his life to activate the warp gateway allowing Yamato to take over a month off their journey to Iscandar, but survives after finding a way to hide from the neutrino radiation bombardment that would have killed him. Out of that a friendship is formed between Sanada and Kodai and a mutual respect. In Odyssey of the Celestial Ark, Sanada's increasing trust on Kodai allows him to give Kodai command during the first encounter with Gatlantean warships. When the rebellion to steal the Yamato begins Sanada gives Kodai command of the Yamato noting he is much better suited to the role and remains the ship's Executive Officer. Sanada joins Kodai and Hajime Saito on Telezart to meet Teresa.
- Japanese voice artist: Takeshi Aono (Original), Hōchū Ōtsuka (2199)
- American Voice Artist: Phil Parsons (2199)
- Live-action actor: Toshirō Yanagiba

- Dr. Sakezo Sado (佐渡酒造, Sado Sakezō) (Dr. Zacharie Sane): The most humorously drawn character in the series, Dr. Sado is frequently a source of comic relief, usually through pratfalls resulting from his love of Japanese wine (sake). Though originally a vet (albeit an unsuccessful one), he becomes the ship's surgeon. He is good humored and always willing to give advice, but he can become deadly earnest when chiding others' behavior. His Japanese given name is written with the same kanji as the word shuzo ("sake brewing"), though his drinking habits were significantly toned down for Star Blazers, his sake given as spring water or soy milk. Along with Kodai, Mori and Sanada, he survives through to the series end in Resurrection where he has returned to veterinary science running an animal sanctuary with Kodai and Mori's daughter Miyuki Kodai. For the 2010 live-action film, Dr. Sado is rewritten as a female character who only occasionally drinks sake.

In 2199 Sado, despite his sake-swilling ways retained, is portrayed as a respected surgeon whose part of his resume is being involved with treating Yuki Mori and Princess Yurisha of Iscandar after a car crash. He is assigned to the Yamato as Medical Officer, as a warship on such a journey is likely to need a surgeon. In addition Sado goes on orders as additional safeguard against Captain Okita's failing health. He is both a cheerful and irascible presence aboard the Yamato and is seen on numerous occasions berating Sanada for exposing Okita to stressful situations as the two are among the very few onboard who is aware of Okita's health. Along with Hikozaemon Tokugawa, he is one of Okita's confidants and friends and is the last to see Okita alive when the Captain asks he to step outside his cabin so he can die having accomplished his goal of seeing the Yamato return to Earth. He has been retired from military service in 2202 when he gathers the crew together on the third anniversary of Okita's death at a statue erected in his honor. It is at this gathering that the crew discussing the summoning from Teresa and begin to plan their response. Sado joins the crew in stealing the Yamato. He helps Yuki Mori in hiding from Kodai after he prevented her from joining the crew. He spends time with the wounded Admiral Hijikata after the rescue of the Planet 11 survivors and the two discuss with Mori how best to support Kodai's command.
- Japanese voice artist: Ichirō Nagai (original), Shigeru Chiba (2199)
- American voice artist: Frank Pita (original), Kenny Green (2199)
- Live-action actress: Reiko Takashima

- Mi-kun (ミーくん, Mī-kun) (Mimi): Dr. Sado's pet cat, apparently the closest he has to family. Left behind on Earth during the first season, he is brought aboard the Yamato in the second season. He is based on Leiji Matsumoto's own cat Mī-kun. Note that in Star Blazers Mimi is female. Mi-kun has also appeared in other Leijiverse stories such as Captain Harlock where he was Doctor Zero's cat.
  - Japanese voice artist: Kōichi Yamadera (PlayStation games)
- Analyzer AU-09 (アナライザー, Anaraizā) (IQ-9, also known as Tobor in the English dub of the first Yamato movie): A squat, human-sized robot who originally worked in the EDF's hospital, Analyzer joins the Yamato crew on his own request, believing it to be the only place he can truly prove himself. He is capable of extending his arms, separating into independently moving pieces, lifting and throwing enemy tanks, withstanding force fields and sensing various forms of energy, but is unable to restrain himself from sexually harassing Yuki on several occasions (not shown in Star Blazers). He is in fact in love with her, but when she proves unable to return his affections, he settles for friendship. Something of a wisecracker, he frequently forms a double-act with Dr. Sado. He is also capable of becoming intoxicated, narrowly avoiding disaster on one occasion (though in Star Blazers he states that he has programmed himself to emulate human hiccups). In the 2010 live-action film, Analyzer is Susumu's robot assistant in a smartphone-like device carried by the latter. His physical body is stored in Susumu's Cosmo Zero unit, and is deployed in combat during the raid of Iscandar/Garmillas. Analyzer is ultimately destroyed by the overwhelming number of Garmillan troops. In 2199, Analyzer is illustrated just like the original, but the robot is portrayed as the purpose built autonomous sub-computer of the Yamato, and is more behaved and a bit of a deadpan. Analyzer is equipped with a "suit" that expands his capabilities, though used only once in Beemela-4. He is later often seen with Dr. Sado pouring sake for him.
  - Japanese voice artist: Ken'ichi Ogata (original), Chō (2199)
  - American voice artist: Sonny Strait (2199)
- Chief Hikozaemon Tokugawa (徳川彦左衛門, Tokugawa Hikozaemon) (Chief Patrick Orion): The middle-aged, balding chief engineer aboard Yamato and an old comrade of Okita. He left behind a grandchild on Earth of whom he is extremely fond. Determined to remain at his post no matter what happens, he suffocates in the last episode of the second season as the engine room fills with fumes. His death was not shown in Star Blazers. In the 2010 live-action film, he is killed during the attack by Dessler's ship upon the Yamato's arrival near Earth. He made it to the end in 2199, him being the man Okita can trust with the Yamato's engine. He, owing to their seniority (he is actually two months away from retirement when he was called to the Yamato), is also one of a few people aboard the Yamato with strong influential power other than Captain Okita, the others being XO Sanada, Dr. Sado, and Engineer Yamazaki.
  - Japanese voice artist: Ichirō Nagai (original), Mugihito (2199)
  - American voice artist: Gordon Ramsay (original), R Bruce Elliot (2199)
  - Live-action actor: Toshiyuki Nishida
- Sukeharu Yabu (薮助治, Yabu Sukeharu) (Travis Sparks): Tokugawa's portly assistant engineer. He believes the Yamato is doomed to fail in its mission to save Earth, and thus decides that humanity should make a new home on Iscandar; hence he and nine other mutineers kidnapping Yuki (their "Eve") to a crystal island, where a tsunami and volcanic eruption killed them, though Yuki is rescued. His death and the deaths of the other mutineers is not shown in Star Blazers, but indicated from later dialogue. In 2199 the mutiny occurs much earlier at Beemela 4, as he is part of a faction that supports their stay on Beemela, though they were overcome and arrested. Yabu is one of two mutineers to survive after the brig is damaged in a subsequent battle and is accidentally left behind on the Garmillas prison planet Leptapoda. Assumed to be of the Zaltzi race, he joins Captain Flakken's ragtag crew aboard the Garmillas dimensional submarine UX-01, who later helped sink General Goer's fleet.
  - Japanese voice artist: Michihiro Ikemizu (episode 14), Ken'ichi Ogata (episode 25), Chō (2199)
  - American voice artist: Ben Phillips (2199)
- Yoshikazu/Giichi Aihara (相原義一, Aihara Yoshikazu/Giichi) (Homer Glitchman): Chief communications officer, Aihara becomes homesick for his native Kitakami, Iwate during the journey to Iscandar after discovering his father on Earth was dying. In his madness, he steals a spacesuit and attempts to float home before being rescued by his comrades. Note that in Japanese, the kanji for his given name can be read in two ways; the reading "Yoshikazu" is used in episode 10 of the first season, but (owing to an error) he gives his name as "Giichi" in the third season. For the 2010 live-action film, Aihara is rewritten as a female character. In 2199 he is a cheerful character and serves as Mori's deputy as communications officer. In 2202 he has joined Kodai and Nanbu.
  - Japanese voice artist: Shinji Nomura (original), Masato Kokubun (2199)
  - American voice artist: Michael Bertolini (original), Aaron Roberts (2199)
  - Live-action actress: Maiko
- Yasuo Nanbu (南部康雄, Nanbu Yasuo) (Dashell "Dash" Johnson): Bespectacled sub-chief of ship's defenses, operating the gun turrets in Kodai's absence, in 2199 he falls in love with Yuki, however is disappointed when he finds Kodai speaking to her instead.
  - Japanese voice artist: Kazuo Hayashi (original), Kenji Akabane (2199)
  - American voice artist: Eddie Allen (original), Stephen Fu (2199)
  - Live-action actor: Toshihiro Yashiba
- Kenjiro Ohta (太田健二郎, Ōta Kenjirō) (Christopher Eager): Portly, freckled radar operator, frequently heard identifying missile attacks on the Yamato.
  - Japanese voice artist: Yoshito Yasuhara, Hirotaka Suzuoki (season 3), Yūki Chiba (2199)
  - Live-action actor: Kensuke Ōwada
- Saburo Kato (加藤三郎, Katō Saburō) (Peter 'Pete' Conroy): The leader of the Black Tiger fighter squadron (second in authority to Kodai), Kato is a gifted though level-headed pilot, often putting his life on the line for his comrades. In the second season he is leader of the first squadron of the Cosmo Tigers, piloting a later model of fighter craft and stationed on the Moon; he and his men volunteer to join the Yamato under Kodai's command. He dies flying Kodai and Sanada back to the Yamato safely; however, this was covered up in Star Blazers, and indeed the original Japanese makers appeared to regret killing the character, as they later introduced his identical twin. In 2199, Kodai and Shima ran afoul of him when he punched them for stealing and crashing his personal Cosmo Zero. The beef between him and Kodai went as so far as warning Kodai that, even if he is his commanding officer, he will never forgive him if he sends any of his men to a needless death. Kato's disdain for Kodai slowly disappeared as Kodai gradually earned his respect throughout the course of the series. He is portrayed as the son of a priest, and he is sometimes heard chanting whenever he is aboard his plane or playing darts in their waiting room. He is also portrayed as a traditional guy, preferring that he and Makoto wear traditional clothing during their wedding (which she vetoed).
  - Japanese voice actor: Akira Kamiya, Keaton Yamada (eps 8-10 only), Yoshimasa Hosoya (2199)
  - American voice actor: Mike McFarland (2199)
  - Live-action actor: Kazuki Namioka
- Akira Yamamoto (山本明, Yamamoto Akira) (Jefferson Davis Hardy): One of the Black Tiger pilots, recognizable by the lock of hair covering his eyes, Yamamoto has only one appearance in the first season, in which his fighter is shot down just before the Yamato undergoes a major warp speed test. Almost left behind, he is waved into the hangar by Kodai, and is injured in a crash-landing. He has a more significant presence in the second season, as commander of the Cosmo Tigers' second squadron; his plane is also stolen by the space marine Saito, who towers over him. He is killed in the final attack on the Comet Empire when his plane is shot down and crashes (not shown in Star Blazers). In 2199, Yamamoto is seen as a female fighter pilot with a brother who was KIA. Yamamoto has more appearances fighting alongside Kodai in a Cosmo Zero (Alpha 2). In Star Blazers he was given a southern United States accent, and in his single first season appearance, he was mistakenly referred to as Conroy.
  - Japanese voice artist: Kazuyuki Sogabe, Rie Tanaka (2199)
  - American voice artist: Jeannie Tirado (2199)
  - Live-action actor: Takumi Saito
- Commander-in-Chief Heikuro Todo (藤堂平九郎, Tōdō Heikurō) (Earth Commander Charles Singleton): Mustached leader of the Earth Defense Force, who in the first season sends the Yamato on its voyage to Iscandar to save the world, and reports to it via long-distance communication (though, in 2199, the Yamato only communicated with him whenever the ship is within the heliosphere). In the second season, he attempts to stop Kodai and the other crew from stealing the Yamato, but becomes convinced by their faith that he must let them go, as they are "Okita's children". His Japanese name is believed to come either from Tōdō Heisuke of the Shinsengumi, or Admiral Heihachiro Togo.
  - Japanese voice artist: Masatō Ibu (original), Shinji Ogawa (2199)
  - American voice artist: Bradley Campbell (2199)
  - Live-action actor: Isao Hashizume
- Cook Kaoru Shintani (新谷かおる, Shintani Kaoru) (Mel "Slops" Mulligan): Chief cook of the Yamato galley. He tells Captain Okita to get out of the kitchen in episode 10. Based on Leiji Matsumoto's assistant Kaoru Shintani who eventually became a manga artist and creator of Area 88. Matsumoto would more directly base another character on Shintani in the form of Yattaran from the Captain Harlock series.
  - Japanese voice artist: Akira Kimura
- Akira Nemoto (根本明, Nemoto Akira) (Frederick Lance): One of the Yamato's Commandos, he accompanies Kodai on the mission to destroy the Reflection Satellite Gun on Pluto. He is electrocuted when he steps into an electrified corridor. His death was covered up in Star Blazers, and his survival is further implied by an off-hand reference to "Lance" in a subsequent episode.
- Kazuhiko Sugiyama (杉山和彦, Sugiyama Kazuhiko) (Harold Cato, /ˈkeɪ.toʊ/ "Kate-oh"): Another commando on the mission to destroy the Reflection Satellite Gun on Pluto, he is shot by guards protecting the gun. His death was edited out of Star Blazers.
- Shigeru Hayashi (林繁, Hayashi Shigeru) (Merrill Ryder): A member of the Navigation Division. He is seen on the 2nd Bridge during the coffee break in episode 15.
- Haruki Ando (安藤春樹, Andō Haruki) (James Anders): Yet another member of the Navigation Division. Ando seems to look up to Kodai as an older brother. He serves on the 3rd bridge, and is killed when a Garmillan ship attaches to said bridge and self-destructs.

=== Second season ===
- Captain Ryu Hijikata (土方竜, Hijikata Ryū) (Captain Draco Gideon): A famous captain whose battle tactics are legendary, and is given command of the new super-battleship Andromeda. Kodai comes to his attention when the Yamato refuses to give way to the larger ship; initially dismissing the acting captain as an upstart, he is charged with preventing Kodai from stealing the Yamato, but the younger man's confidence inspires him to let him leave. Hijikata later leads the EDF's battle against the Comet Empire's fleet, and it is only his inspired thinking that defeats them. He is ultimately killed battling against the Comet Empire's space station, Gatlantis, when he rams the Andromeda into it in order to give the Yamato time to escape. Before he does so, he tells Kodai Gatlantis' weak point is its lower hemisphere. In the alternate version of the story presented in Farewell to Space Battleship Yamato, Hijikata is the captain of a crippled spaceship at the edge of the Solar System who assumes command of the Yamato when rescued, but dies during the battle against the Comet Empire. He appears earlier in 2199 as Yuki Mori's guardian and a comrade of Captain Okita, who tried convincing him that he should go in his place, given his condition.
  - Japanese voice artist: Akira Kimura (original), Unshō Ishizuka (2199)
  - American voice actor: Bill Jenkins (2199)
- Kotetsu Serizawa (芹沢虎鉄, Serizawa Kotetsu) (General Thomas Stone): Staff officer at EDF HQ under the command of Heikuro Todo. He is enraged by the Yamato crew's insubordination and uses every tool at his disposal to stop the Yamato from leaving Earth for Telezart. This includes using magnetic missiles and the Battle Satellite. In the DVD extras for Star Blazers: The Comet Empire extras his full name is revealed as Thomas Stone.
  - Japanese voice artist: Mahito Tsumura
- Company Commander Hajime Saito (斎藤始, Saitō Hajime) (Sergeant Webb Knox): The commander of the Space Cavalry (空間騎兵隊 Kūkan Kiheitai) 1st Armored Division stationed on Planet 11, rescued by the Yamato after a fierce Comet Empire attack. Uncouth and belligerent, he and his men refuse to respect the crew of their new home and frequently get into fights, frustrated at their reduced role as "passengers". However, on the surface of planet Telezart, inside Dessler's flagship and within the Comet Empire's own space station, Saito and his men prove their worth in ground combat. Saito is the last surviving member of the team, and sacrifices himself to detonate explosives in the Comet Empire's power centre (though in Star Blazers it was indicated that he escaped). In the 2010 live-action film, Saito is briefly possessed by Dessler, who uses his body to tell the Yamato crew of Garmillas' true motives of bombarding Earth. Saito wears a Hachiman amulet, as his mother believes it will shield him from physical harm. Ultimately, he is killed while covering for Sanada during the raid of Iscandar/Garmillas.
  - Japanese voice artist: Isao Sasaki
  - American voice artist: Chris Latta
  - Live-action actor: Hiroyuki Ikeuchi
- Hyōgo Tōdō (藤堂兵吾, Tōdō Hyōgo) (Corporal Kane): Second-in-Command of the Space Marines. He was likely killed inside the White Comet Gatlantis in the final battle.
  - Japanese voice artist: Toshihiko Kojima
- (Mac Tapper): Radio operator on Planet 11. In the Japanese version, he dies within seconds of being introduced, and as such is unnamed; however, in the Star Blazers dub, Nox calls him "Mac" and in the script's cast list he is referred to as Tapper, and his spoken lines are written under "Radioman." Later, a second soldier with a different voice is given the name "Tapper," though the script refers to him as "Marine B." Later on in episode 7, Marine H is referred to as "Mac."
  - Japanese voice artist: (Unknown)
  - American voice artist: (Unknown)
- Jirō Tsurumi (鶴見二郎, Tsurumi Jirō) (Buzz): Cosmo Tiger 3rd Squadron commander. Tsurumi got little screen time. His fate is unknown, but he was likely killed in the final battle with the Comet Empire with the other Cosmo Tigers.
  - Japanese voice artist: Shigeru Chiba
- Yasuhiko Yamada (山田安彦, Yamada Yasuhiko) (William Peale): Yamato's interrogator. He tortured Mazer in a futile attempt at extracting intelligence from him.
  - Japanese voice artist: Rokurō Naya
- Hyota Arakome (新米俵太, Arakome Hyōta) (Neville Q. Royster): An extremely nerdy (and comically drawn) scientist cadet, addressed by all but Kodai—including his superior officer and senpai Sanada—as shinmai (meaning "newbie" or "boot", but also being a different reading of the kanji in his family name). Despite his clumsiness, he proves his worth as a scientist and engineer, and in one episode comes up with an idea to use the wave motion gun as propulsion to save the ship that even Sanada did not think of. He is killed in the final battle against the Comet Empire shortly after locating Gatlantis's power centre (not shown in Star Blazers).
  - Japanese voice artist: Yūji Mitsuya
- Dr. Kurata (山田安彦, Kurata-hakase) (Dr. Skyler): Astronomer at the Central Observatory who realizes the White Comet is behaving irregularly for a comet.
  - Japanese voice artist:
- Momo (もも, Momo) (Serena): Daughter of Dr. Kurata, getting married when she is introduced. Tells a guy at the airport about the White Comet. Because she gets married within a minute of being introduced as a character, her name is not listed here as "Momo Kurata," but simply "Momo," as it is not said what her new last name is.
  - Japanese voice artist:
- (Alan Slate): Captain of a Dreadnought-class battleship and commander of a small fleet which engages General Valsey in episode 21. Unnamed in the original Japanese version, but named Captain Slate in the dub. In the DVD extras, his first name is revealed to be Alan.
  - Japanese voice artist:

=== Yamato: The New Voyage ===
- Tasuke Tokugawa (徳川太助, Tokugawa Tasuke) (Patrick Orion Jr.): Son of the late Chief Tokugawa, he is a cadet training to follow in his father's footsteps. He later becomes Yamazaki's assistant engineer aboard the Yamato and is the chief engineer in Yamato Rebirth.
  - Japanese voice artist: Tōru Furuya
- Chief Sho Yamazaki (山崎奨, Yamazaki Shō): Chief engineer aboard the Yamato from Yamato: The New Voyage until Final Yamato.
  - Japanese voice artist: Mikio Terashima
- Shigeru Sakamoto (坂本茂, Sakamoto Shigeru): An ace fighter pilot who joins the training mission. A born hot-dogger, his stunts earn him a slap in the face from acting captain Kodai. He is not seen again after The New Voyage, although he does appear in the PlayStation 2 games.
  - Japanese voice artist: Toshio Furukawa
- Tetsuya Kitano (北野哲也, Kitano Tetsuya): A trainee navigator, he is put in charge of ship's weapons during a battle simulation, but when he panics and fires too soon, he nearly destroys the fighter squadron. He is later punished along with Sakamoto to run a lap in the ship with only underwear on. He is not seen again after The New Voyage, although he does appear in the PlayStation 2 games.
  - Japanese voice artist: Makio Inoue

=== Be Forever, Yamato ===
- Captain Osamu Yamanami (山南修, Yamanami Osamu): 2nd captain of the Yamato, and a former colleague of Okita and Hijikata.
  - Japanese voice artist: Osamu Kobayashi
- Shiro Kato (加藤四郎, Katō Shirō) (Cory Conroy): Cosmo Tiger pilot and younger brother of the late Saburo Kato. When he appears in the English translation of Space Battleship Yamato III (Season 3 of Star Blazers), Saburo and Shiro, who look identical, are for all intents and purposes regarded as the same "Conroy" character since Saburo's death was edited out of the preceding Comet Empire series of Star Blazers.
  - Japanese voice actor: Akira Kamiya
- Sasha Kodai (古代サーシャ, Kodai Sāsha) (Sasha Wildstar): Introduced as Sanada's niece Mio Sanada (真田澪, Sanada Mio), she substitutes for Yuki aboard the Yamato. It emerges that she is actually the half-human daughter of Mamoru Kodai and Starsha, and like all Iscandarians has grown into the equivalent of a human teenager in the space of a year.
  - Japanese voice artist: Keiko Han

=== Argo Press' Comic Series ===
- Sasha Wildstar:
- Deke Wakefield: Black Tiger pilot and self-insert of Star Blazers lore expert Derek Wakefield.
- Stephen Sandor:
- Tetsuya Kitano:
- Abraham Avatar: Now with severe amnesia,
- Commander-in-Chief Charles Singleton:
- President:
- Captain Osamu Yamanami:
- Minister Aziz: Similar to Shino Todo from 3199
- Senator Mandella:
- Dr. Simon Probe:
- Dr. Karl Ryder:

=== Third season ===
- Ryusuke Domon (土門竜介, Domon Ryūsuke) (Jason Jetter): A new recruit assigned to the Kitchen. Originally resentful of his position, he quickly learns to accept it. A focal character in Series 3, he often becomes involved in missions outside of his kitchen duty.
  - Japanese voice artist: Hideyuki Tanaka
- Takeshi Ageha (揚羽武, Ageha Takeshi) (Michael "Flash" Contrail): A new member of the Cosmo Tigers. His father did not support his decision to become a pilot, but allowed him to remain with the Yamato at his wife's insistence.
  - Japanese voice artist: Toshio Furukawa
- Hajime Hirata (平田一, Hirata Hajime) (Alan Hardy): A veteran member of the Kitchen crew, he serves as a mentor to new recruit Domon. He is killed in the Yamato's first battle against the Galmans when the ship is infiltrated by enemy soldiers.
  - Japanese voice artist: Kazuyuki Sogabe
- Namio Sakamaki (坂巻浪夫, Sakamaki Namio) (Greg): Yamato 1st Cannon Gunner; very short.
  - Japanese voice artist: Shigeru Chiba
- Goro Raiden (雷電五郎, Raiden Gorō) (Buster Block): A very tall, hulking member of the Navigation group.
  - Japanese voice artist: Shingo Kanemoto
- Heiji Bando (坂東平次, Bandō Heiji) (Heiji "Beaver" Bando): A new recruit assigned to the Science group.
  - Japanese voice artist: Kaneto Shiozawa
- Dairoku Akagi (赤城大六, Akagi Dairoku) (Ace "Toughy" Diamond): Works in Engine Room. Former space trucker.
  - Japanese voice artist: Daiki Takayama
- Haruo Nishina (仁科春夫, Nishina Haruo) (Ben "String" Bean): A 1st Cannon gunner. He is a friend of fellow gunner Sakamaki.
  - Japanese voice artist: Akira Murayama
- Tsutomu Makunouchi (幕之内勉, Makunouchi Tsutomu) (Tsutumu "Whizzer" Makunouchi): A husky, bespectacled member of the Kitchen crew.
  - Japanese voice artist: Satoru Inagaki
- Akiko Todo (藤堂晶子, Tōdō Akiko) (Wendy Singleton): Granddaughter of Heikuro Todo and works as his secretary. Has a mutual attraction with Aihara.
  - Japanese voice artist: Kazuko Sugiyama

=== Space Battleship Yamato: Resurrection ===
- Susumu Kodai (古代 進, Kodai Susumu): After retiring form the military, Kodai becomes the captain of a cargo vessel as a means of escaping Earth after the destruction of the original Yamato. When two Emigration Fleets are destroyed and his wife Yuki is presumed killed by an unknown new enemy, he takes command of the Third Emigration Fleet, and becomes captain of its lead ship, the newly rebuilt Yamato.
  - Japanese voice artist: Kōichi Yamadera
- Yuki Mori (森 雪, Mori Yuki): Years after the sinking of the Yamato on Aquarius, Yuki becomes the captain of an escort battleship with the First Emigration Fleet, presumed lost in action.
  - Japanese voice artist: Noriko Yume
- Miyuki Kodai (古代美雪, Kodai Miyuki): Daughter of Susumu Kodai and Yuki Mori. She is Dr. Sado's veterinary assistant, and has grown distant from her father due to his never being home, as well as his attachment to the Yamato.
  - Japanese voice artist: Ayumi Fujimura
- Shiro Sanada (真田志郎, Sanada Shirō): In this movie, the former Science officer of the Yamato is now Secretary of Science for the Earth Federation. He especially wanted Kodai to lead the Third Emigration Fleet.
  - Japanese voice artist: Takeshi Aono
- Jiro Shima (島 次郎, Shima Jirō): Head of the Earth Federation's Migration Fleet.
  - Japanese voice artist: Ryōtarō Okiayu
- Dr. Sakezo Sado (佐渡酒造, Sado Sakezō): Head of a Safari Park in Africa. Stays on Earth rather than joining the crew, and even stays behind when the Yamato sent a rescue craft to evacuate him and Miyuki.
  - Japanese voice artist: Ichirō Nagai
- Analyzer (アナライザー, Anaraizā): Dr. Sado's assistant at the Safari Park.
  - Japanese voice artist: Ken'ichi Ogata
- Kosaku Ohmura (大村耕作, Ōmura Kōsaku): Executive officer, killed on a suicide mission aboard the auxiliary space battleship Shinano against the SUS mothership. He is one of Captain Kodai's crew aboard the freighter he captained.
  - Japanese voice artist: Chafurin
- Ryo Kamijo (上条了, Kamijō Ryō): Battle chief. He survived the SUS attack on the Blue Noah and was rescued by Captain Kodai's crew.
  - Japanese voice artist: Kentarō Itō
- Maho Orihara (折原真帆, Orihara Maho): Chief Navigator and in-charge of the Yamato's onboard computer. She is known as "The Child of the ECI."
  - Japanese voice artist: Ryōka Yuzuki
- Miharu Sasaki (佐々木美晴, Sasaki Miharu): She is the Yamato's doctor, but she prefers flying a Cosmo Pulsar.
  - Japanese voice artist: Fuyuka Oura
- Jun Kobayashi (小林淳, Kobayashi Jun): Chief Pilot. Hot-headed and at first, he came into conflict with a few personnel, notably Ryo. Spends most of his time trying to impress Miharu-sensei.
  - Japanese voice artist: Daisuke Namikawa
- Yoichi Sakurai (桜井洋一, Sakurai Yōichi): Radar Operator.
  - Japanese voice artist: Kenji Nojima
- Ryohei Nakanishi (中西良平, Nakanishi Ryōhei): Communications Officer.
  - Japanese voice artist: Kappei Yamaguchi
- Saburo Kinoshita (木下三郎, Kinoshita Saburō): Science Officer.
  - Japanese voice artist: Kōsuke Toriumi
- Minoru Goda (郷田実, Gōda Minoru): Chief Gunner.
  - Japanese voice artist: Akimitsu Takase
- Tasuke Tokugawa: Former Engineer of the Yamato, leaves his position as a commanding officer at the Earth Defense Force's Moonbase to become Chief Engineer of the Yamato. He is the son of the Yamato's first chief engineer, Hikozaemon Tokugawa, whom he briefly mentioned in the 2199 series.
  - Japanese voice artist: Tōru Furuya
- So Tenma (天馬走, Tenma Sō): Engineering Maintenance.
- Sho Tenma (天馬翔, Tenma Shō): Engineering Maintenance.
  - These twins are also responsible for rebuilding the Yamato's engine room.
  - Japanese voice artist: Daisuke Sakaguchi

=== Space Battleship Yamato 2199 and 2202 ===
- Master Chief Petty Officer Isami Enomoto (榎本勇, Enomoto Isami): Boatswain. He is revealed to be Susumu Kodai's naval academy trainor.
  - Japanese voice artist: Keiji Fujiwara
  - American voice artist: Bryan Massey
- Lieutenant Kaoru Niimi (新見薫, Niimi Kaoru): Technology Department, Information Chief. She is also part of the faction that attempted to mutiny aboard the Yamato; however she was later pardoned after some time in the brig. Also, Mamoru Kodai broke up with her before heading for Pluto into battle.
  - Japanese voice artist: Aya Hisakawa
  - American voice artist: Mikaela Krantz
- Ensign Akira Yamamoto (山本玲, Yamamoto Akira): Assigned to Accounting, but she desires to be a pilot to avenge her brother, a pilot (and a former comrade of Saburo) who was KIA against the Garmillans. Because of this, she was, at first, at odds with the Garmillan pilot named Melda Ditz; but would later become good friends. She is a Marsinoid, a human born on the planet Mars.
  - Japanese voice artist: Rie Tanaka
  - American voice artist: Jeannie Tirado
- Makoto Harada (原田真琴, Harada Makoto): Civilian Health Officer, and is Saburo Kato's love interest.
  - Japanese voice artist: Rina Satō
  - American voice artist: Felecia Angelle
- Warrant Officer Yuria Misaki (岬百合亜, Misaki Yuria): Operations Specialist Cadet. Born with minor psychic abilities, she sensed something special in the Yamato's automatic navigation system. Drawn to investigating the central core, she allowed within her the consciousness of Yurisha Iscandar, whose body was being transported home in cold sleep due to Yurisha's comatose state as a result of a traffic accident on Earth. When necessary, Yurisha's personality dominates, then allows Yuria to resurface. The two personalities can be distinguished both by behavior and by hair style. Yuria wears her hear bound in twin pig-tails, Yurisha wears her hair loose. The association proves to be anywhere from useful to life-saving starting from episode 14. She is in charge of running the onboard radio station.
  - Japanese voice artist: Aya Uchida
  - American voice artist: Sarah Wiedenheft
- Second Lieutenant Hiroki Shinohara (篠原弘樹, Shinohara Hiroki): Pilot of a Cosmo Falcon, he flies a captured Garmillas interceptor into the heart of the gathering at the base at Balun. He is a friend of Akira Yamamoto and names the captured interceptor "sword 3" in favor of Yamamoto's brother who was killed in action.
  - Japanese voice artist: Daisuke Hirakawa
  - American voice artist: Eric Vale
- Lieutenant J.G. Shinya Ito (伊東真也, Itō Shin'ya): Security Chief. He is actually the leader of the pro-Izumo faction that infiltrated and then mutinied aboard the Yamato in favor of staying on Beemela-4. Killed on the prison planet Leptapoda.
  - Japanese voice artist: Toshihiko Seki
- Warrant Officer Toru Hoshina (星名透, Hoshina Tōru): Security Officer. Working under orders from Director Todo, He alerted a few personnel aboard the Yamato of a few pro-Izumo faction members infiltrating the Yamato crew, and helped quell the mutiny. He becomes Yuria's love interest.
  - Japanese voice artist: Motoki Takagi
  - American voice artist: Justin Briner
- Petty Officer 1st Class Miki Saijo (西条未来): Radar operator who occasionally fills in for Yuki Mori.
  - Japanese voice artist: Satomi Moriya
- Petty Officer 3rd Class Shinpei Iwata (岩田新平, Iwata Shinpei): Third Deck operator
  - Japanese voice artist: Kōki Harasawa
- Leading Seaman Kiyoshi Toyama (遠山清, Tōyama Kiyoshi): Third Deck operator
  - Japanese voice artist: Kōji Yusa
- Engineer Susumu Yamazaki: Assistant Engine Room Chief Engineer. He revealed to Daisuke Shima who really fired the first shot in the war between the humans and the Garmillans.
  - Japanese voice artist: Hiroshi Tsuchida
  - American voice artist: Robert McCollum

=== Space Battleship Yamato 2205 and 3199 ===
- add later. ryusuke domon looks like deku and there are 2 kitanos now

== Allies of humanity ==
- Starsha (スターシャ, Sutāsha): Queen of the dying planet Iscandar, and one of its last survivors, Starsha reaches out to the endangered people of Earth in the first season, offering a device called Cosmo-Cleaner-D (Cosmo-DNA in Star Blazers, and Cosmo Reverse System in 2199), which would cleanse the planet of deadly radiation. She sends her sister Sasha to the Solar System bearing this message, together with plans for a faster-than-light space drive. However, when the Yamato arrives, she confesses that she had actually possessed the means to send the device to Earth, but had wanted to test humanity's worthiness to survive, an action she regrets. Though willing to help Earth, she chooses to remain on her homeworld and face its ultimate fate with dignity. She has also rescued and healed Mamoru Kodai, who chooses to remain with her. In Yamato: The New Journey she sends her husband and child (also named Sasha) away from Iscandar before detonating the planet's doomsday bomb in order to defeat the plans of the Black Nebula and prevent Dessler from sacrificing himself. Her spirit appears to her daughter in Be Forever, Yamato. She and Sasha are nearly identical in appearance to Yuki (albeit longer-haired), though this is a coincidence. In 2199, she did not only give the Cosmo-Cleaner-D/Cosmo Reverse System, but also reworked the Yamato to be the device itself (which involved sealing the Wave Motion Gun port). It is also implied that before Mamoru Kodai died, they may have fallen in love with each other and left Starsha with a child (episode 24). The character of Starsha does not appear in the 2010 live-action film, but Miyuki Ueda does the voice of the spiritual embodiment of Iscandar.
  - Japanese voice artist: Michiko Hirai (season 1), Miyuki Ueda (New Voyage and Be Forever), Kikuko Inoue (2199)
  - American voice artist: Lydia Leeds (original), Monica Rial (2199)
- Sasha (サーシャ, Sāsha) (Astra): Starsha's identical sister, also of royal blood. Sasha travels to the Solar System to deliver Starsha's message to Earth, but her ship is shot down and crashes on Mars. After leaving her escape pod she suffocates in the Martian atmosphere before being found by Kodai and Shima. In 2199, the last active earth fleet distracted the Garmillans from noticing the arrival of her ship (codenamed Amaterasu). Her ship encounters engine failure just before landing on Mars and, despite using an escape pod, she perished when Kodai and Shima found her.
- Yurisha: In the 2199 series, she is the second Iscandarian princess who went ahead of Sasha to deliver the blueprints for the Wave Motion Engine. She met an accident on Earth which involved Yuki Mori and became comatose. She was loaded on board the Yamato in that state in a capsule as the core of the ship's Automatic Navigation System, as they need her memories as the humans even don't know where Iscandar is despite having maps supplied to them—a kept secret until Captain Okita revealed it to the crew. She possessed Yuria Misaki at first to manifest her presence and her consciousness until she awakens from her coma, and remained as an observer who reported to Queen Starsha later. She reveals to Yuki that the Yamato actually making it to Iscandar is a requirement for the Cosmo Reverse System to work. She stayed on Iscandar with Melda Dietz as her aide in helping the people of Garmillas. She considers Yuki as her "one-time other self," as they are nearly identical in looks.
  - Japanese voice artist: Houko Kuwashima (2199)
  - American voice artist: Mallorie Rodak (2199)
- Teresa (テレサ, Teresa) (Trelaina): A telepathic young woman living on the planet Telezart (also romanized as Teresart or Terezart) in a hovering palace, who has mastered anti-matter (according to the English dub) and whose prayers generate a powerful energy. She watched her world, an interstellar hub, degenerate into all-out war, but prayed so fervently that she destroyed all life forms. When the Comet Empire threatens our Galaxy, she sends messages to Earth attempting to warn them of the danger, bringing the Yamato to her world; during the Earth ship's journey she falls in love with Shima over radio. However, though she refuses to leave her world and become a part of Earth, her love for Shima overcomes her pacifism and she uses her psionic power to transform Telezart into pure energy and detonates it directly in the path of the Comet Empire in an attempt to destroy it. While the Comet Empire's plasma shield keeps them from being destroyed, Teresa's efforts blow it off its flight path and causes it heavy damage, enabling the Yamato to arrive in the Milky Way ahead of it. She survives in her spacecraft and travels to the Solar System, where she discovers Shima's corpse floating in space and resuscitates him using her own blood. With her last remaining power, she then destroys Zworder's dreadnaught and saves Earth from destruction. What becomes of her after this is unclear. While some fans believe Teresa sacrificed her life to destroy Zworder, others believe she is still alive somewhere in the universe, given that she easily survived the destruction of Telezart. In the alternate version of the story told in the movie Farewell to Space Battleship Yamato, Teresa plays a similar role, but she is composed entirely of anti-matter (and naked), and does not fall in love with Shima. Moreover, at the end of the movie she does not destroy Zworder's ship, but instead her spirit urges Kodai to do so using the Yamato.
  - Japanese voice artist: Mari Okamoto, (Miyuki Ueda (Arrivederci, Yamato)
  - American voice artist: Lydia Leeds (original)
- Princess Luda (ルダ王女, Ruda Ōjo) (Mariposa)
  - Japanese voice artist: Keiko Han
  - American voice artist: Corinne Orr
- Leader Dessler: See below.

== Garmillas ==
The Garmillans (originally romanized as Gamilas, Gamilons in the Star Blazers dub) are a race of humanoids from the planet Garmillas in the Large Magellanic Cloud, 50 kiloparsecs (≈160,000 light-years) from Earth. They are biologically indistinguishable from humans aside from their blue skin (although, owing to early series production decisions, they were given human-colored skin for the first ten episodes of the original series). Many of those who appear in the series are named after high-ranking members of the Nazi party. Garmillan civilians seldom appear in the original series implying that it is a highly militarized society, and the few female Garmillans who appear in the series are almost invariably concubines. In the remake, the Garmillan society is shown with more detail, depicting most Garmillan soldiers as family men, and some women are featured as part of the military as well.

In the 2010 live-action film, the Garmillans are depicted as a more alien-like race with a hive mind.

- Leader (Lord) Dessler (デスラー 総統, Desurā Sōtō) (Leader Desslok): Leader of the militant people of the dying planet Garmillas, Dessler intends to wipe out the human "barbarians" and migrate his people to Earth. Initially contemptuous of humanity and its struggles to survive, he comes to respect the Yamato as it surpasses endless trials on its journey to Iscandar. He even attempts to use his dying, volcanically active planet as a weapon against the Earth ship, but the ensuing battle results in the near-total destruction of his civilization, and he swears revenge. Apparently killed at the end of the first season when his own Dessler cannon backfires and destroys his flagship, he re-emerges in the second season having been resuscitated by the advanced medicine of the Comet Empire. Emperor Zworder grants him the chance to destroy the Yamato, but ultimately he comes to realize that his desire for revenge has made him no better than the Comet Empire, who live solely for conquest; it is Yuki's attempt to protect a wounded Kodai that convinces him that humans are capable of the same love he feels for his people, and he withdraws from battle, aiming to rebuild his civilization (which becomes known as the Galman-Garmillas Empire). Before departing, in the Comet Empire series, he shares an important detail about a potential weakness in the White Comet fortress.

Although initially an enemy to Earth, he informs Earth Defense Force of the dire situation planet Iscandar was in when he returned to Garmillas to find the Black Nebula Force mining for resources to fuel their war machine. He later becomes an ally of the Yamato when Iscandar was plunged into deep space after Garmillas exploded, and the Black Nebula forces pursued the planet and threatened Starsha. Working together with the crew of Yamato, his bitterness lifted and he acclaimed his love for Starsha. Starsha however sacrifices herself and her planet to stop the giant Black Nebulan battle fortress sent to secure the planet's resources for war purposes. Because of her sacrifice, Dessler had a renewed sensation of love and peace which he had never realized was inside his heart. He departs at the end of the battle on good terms with Earth and Yamato.

A couple of years after the destruction of Garmillas, Dessler wanders the Milky Way Galaxy, and finds his ancestral home planet Galman which is occupied by the Bolar Federation. He quickly mounts a counter-attack to free his people, and in doing so proclaims himself as the new Emperor, set on ridding the galaxy of the cruel Bolars. However, because of his quick quest to secure the entire Milky Way Galaxy, his officers become war-mongers who would use planet-destroying hyperion missiles to eliminate any enemy or resistance. One such missile had gone astray and struck Earth's Sun causing accelerated nuclear fusion to the point that the Sun was to explode in less than a year. In response to Earth's dire situation, and unaware that Dessler's empire is responsible for it, Yamato was sent to search for a new planet suitable for human habitation. The Yamato was attacked by Galman forces when they intervened in a conflict in a neighboring system, Berth. Because of the intervention, Galman officers and generals made it a top priority to destroy or capture the ship. Yamato was trapped inside the hangar of a mobile super fortress of the Galman Eastern Task Force fortress, and taken to be presented to Dessler. Upon presentation, Dessler flew into a rage at his generals' failure to obey his order to stay far from Earth's solar system, and apologized to the crew of Yamato. He then learned that his empire was the cause of Earth's plight. He offered to help Earth by dispatching a fleet of the empire's best scientists to restore the proper nuclear fusion to the Sun. This however proved to be futile, and the Sun worsened from their manipulation. Out of scientific ideas, he provides coordinates to a planet like Earth called Phantom. Phantom however turned out to be an unsuitable planet, as it was a living organism able to telepathically camouflage itself as a planet to protect Queen Mariposa from the Bolars. Upon Yamato's discovery of this fact, Queen Mariposa is escorted and protected by the crew of Yamato to her home planet, Guardiana, where she offers the Hydro-Cosmogen cannon to correct the Sun's erratic nuclear fusion. Dessler, following Yamato, learns of the Queen's home planet, and decides to peacefully add planet Guardiana to his empire so as to sway all people of the galaxy (Galman and Bolar) towards peace as her people's culture are pacifists and peace-talkers. Stability and peace is spread throughout the Milky Way Galaxy.

It is, however, not until the film, Final Yamato, when the people of Dinguil try to conquer Earth by using Aquarius to bring massive floods, that Dessler performs one last act of assistance for Earth. The Denguilan fleet surrounds the Yamato which, having been converted into an H-bomb to block the column of water hurling towards Earth, was unable to fight. Dessler launches a surprise attack on the fleet, and destroys its capital ship using his Dessler cannon. The attack comes as a surprise to the Yamato's crew as well, as they had assumed that Dessler had been killed when Galman had collided with another planet earlier in the film. In the last scene, when Yamato detonates to stop the 10-trillion-ton water column from hitting Earth, Dessler is seen atop his ship silently watching the Yamato settle in an ocean in space.

For the live-action film, Dessler has no physical form; instead, he appears as one or more multiple crystals and initially possesses Hajime Saito's body to tell the Yamato crew the true motive of his race's attack on Earth.

His Japanese name is believed to come from Nazi Germany's Adolf Hitler, and Dessler's title Sōtō (総統) is the Japanese translation of führer. Leiji Matsumoto has claimed this similarity is in fact a coincidence, and that Dessler comes from "Death-Ra" (also written as デスラー in Japanese).
- Japanese voice artist: Masato Ibu (Season 1), Kouichi Yamadera (2199)
- American voice artist: Eddie Allen (seasons 1 & 2), Chris Rager (2199)

- Viceroy Hyss (副総統ヒス, Fukusousaitou Hisu)/General Hyss (ヒス将軍, Hisu Shougun) (General Krypt): Dessler's toadying right-hand man, Hyss tries his best to please his leader, apologizing for every embarrassing mistake and passing his anger on to his underlings. However, during the climactic battle on Garmillas he implores Dessler to make peace with the humans, earning him a bullet in the chest (not shown in Star Blazers, in its place is a reuse of dialogue footage between Dessler and Hyss where Desslok now merely reprimands Krypt for engaging in defeatist talk). In the first ten episodes, Hyss has the title of Vice Leader (副総統). With episode eleven, his title changes to General (将軍).
  - Japanese voice artist: Keisuke Yamashita (Season 1), Yousuke Akimoto (2199)
  - American voice artist: Ray Gestaut (2199)
- Commanders Schultz (シュルツ, Shurutsu) and Ganz (ガンツ, Gantsu) (Colonel Ganz and Major Bane): The leaders of the Garmillans' frontline base on Pluto, Valke Shultz and Gelf Gantz are among the first to encounter the dangerous new Earth ship Yamato. However, even armed with a powerful weapon, the Reflection Satellite Cannon (Reflex Gun in Star Blazers), the bumbling duo are unable to stop the Earth ship and are forced to abandon their base. Recognizing that they can never return home in disgrace, Shultz orders the entire fleet to launch an all-out attack on the Yamato, but they are destroyed; Shultz's command ship attempts a kamikaze run (though in Star Blazers this was toned down to an accidental near-collision) before being deflected into an asteroid.
  - Japanese voice artists: Takeshi Obayashi (Shultz) and Kenichi Ogata (Gantz); Yu Shimaka (Shultz) and Chō (Gantz) (2199)
  - American voice artists: Mike Czechopoulos (original); Mark Stoddard (Shultz) and Tyson Rinehart (Ganz) (2199)
- General Talan (タラン, Taran) (General Talon): One of Dessler's most loyal generals, Talan appears only twice in the first season; however, in the second season he has a more significant presence, as commander of the scattered remnants of the Garmillan empire. He is more level-headed than his leader and is able to convince Dessler to abandon his flagship when all is lost. He is also an extremely skillful pilot, rescuing Dessler from the Comet Empire's pursuing ships. He was mistakenly renamed "Sergeant Masterson" in season 3 of Star Blazers. Talan is also the most repeatedly redesigned character in Space Battleship Yamato. Originally, he was skinny, had a pencil-thin mustache, and a tall, soft face; but in Farewell he was given a little more muscle, a lot more mustache, his hair was made brown, and he looked a few years older and much more tired. Then, in Yamato 2 (or Star Blazers: The Comet Empire) he was completely redesigned—given much more muscle, a sharp jaw and butt chin, a medium-sized mustache, and red-brown hair. In addition, he was made younger again. Then, in the Comico comic, his skin was turned green and he was otherwise given his Farewell design, while Masterson was made into a different character altogether, with grey hair and no mustache.
  - Japanese voice artist: Kōji Yada (original), Yutaka Aoyama (as "Welte Talan," 2199), Koutarou Nakamura (as "Ghader Talan," 2199)
  - American voice artist: Chuck Huber (as "Welte Talan," 2199), Brad Jackson (as "Ghader Talan," 2199)
- General Domel (ドメル, Domeru Shougun) (General Lysis): A famed general with many victories under his belt, and a powerful physique to match his ego, Domel is put in charge of the campaign against Earth and offers to destroy the Yamato in his leader's name. However, despite using both outright force and psychological warfare, he too is defeated in battle time and again, culminating in a scheme to destroy the Earth ship on planet Balun which succeeds only in the destruction of the Garmillan base there. Offered one last battle for honor, he challenges the Yamato to meet him at the Rainbow Cluster; so meticulous is his planning that he very nearly succeeds, and it is only quick thinking (and luck) on the part of the Yamato crew that destroys his fleet. He then attaches his command ship to the underside of the Yamato and self-destructs in a vain attempt to complete his mission (though in Star Blazers it was indicated he planted a bomb on the Argo's underside and detached. This was followed by a reuse of dialogue footage between Lysis and Vulgar now indicating that because the bomb's blast didn't destroy the Argo they were returning to Garmillas in disgrace). He is credited with the invention of a device called the Instant Matter Transporter (Space Matter Instant Transforming Equipment, or SMITE, in Star Blazers), capable of teleporting whole battle fleets into the vicinity of an enemy vessel, which is used later by Dessler himself.
  - Japanese voice artist: Osamu Kobayashi (Season 1), Akio Ohtsuka (2199)
  - American voice artist: J. Michael Tatum (2199)
- Goer (ゲール, Gēru) (Volgar): Garamond Goer is one-time commander of the Garmillans' waypoint base on planet Balun, he reacts to his replacement by Domel angrily, getting drunk and trashing his decadently decorated room (this scene was cut from Star Blazers). Desperate to prove himself to Dessler, he attempts to fight the Yamato on his own terms, but is defeated resoundingly; he also informs Dessler of Domel's plan to sacrifice the base in an attempt to destroy the Yamato, leading to a critical delay which enables the Earth ship to escape. However, he comes to admire Domel's loyalty to the Garmillan cause, and assists him in his battle for honor. In 2199, he served under General Herm Zoellick, and then under General Domel; and is once the superior to everyone in Pluto Base. He himself killed General Zoellick upon knowing that he plotted to assassinate Dessler. He and his fleet was destroyed by Captain Flakken's dimensional submarine as he tried lure the Yamato into the hyperspace gate.
  - Japanese voice artist: Osamu Saka (Season 1), Masashi Hirose (2199)
  - American voice artist: Mike Czechopoulos (original), Barry Yandell (2199)
- Captains Getto (ゲットー, Gettō), Berger (バーガー, Bāgā), Kreuze (クロイツ, Kuroitsu) and Heidern (ハイデルン, Haiderun) (Captains Skarp, Ranker, Zadik, and Borka): Captains who serve under Domel in the battle at the Rainbow Cluster, having earned great acclaim at, respectively, the Ruby, Sapphire, Diamond and Omega war fronts. The first three command space carriers and their respective fighter, dive-bomber, and torpedo plane air groups, while the last commands a battle carrier launching a single heavy bomber which carries a drill missile designed by Domel. All four captains fly into battle themselves alongside their men, though Kreuz is not shown (due to an oversight by the animators).
  - Japanese voice artists: Kōji Yada (Heidern), Takeshi Aono (Berger), Ichirō Nagai (Getto), Isao Sakuma (Kreuz)
- Commodore Vandeval (バンデベル, Bandeberu) (Garrat): Commander of a Garmillan battle carrier in season 2, he sends a fleet of dive-bombers to attack the Yamato when it is paralyzed by a swarm of corrosive bacteria. However, before he can destroy the Earth ship, his own vessel is similarly rendered powerless, and he is forced to retreat in disgrace. His humiliation earns him a bullet from Dessler (not shown in Star Blazers).
  - Japanese voice artist: Hidekatsu Shibata
- Generals Barreled Action (バレルド・アクション, Barerudo Akushon), Sea Frage (シー・フラーゲ, Shī Furāge), Das Lugens (ダス・ルーゲンス, Dasu Rūgensu), Meiser nom Drum (マイゼル・ノム・ドラム, Maizeru Nomu Doramu): Dessler's remaining generals in Season 2.
  - Japanese voice artists: Eken Mine (Action), Yoshito Yasuhara (Frage), Kazuo Hayashi (Lugens), Kenichi Ogata (Meiser)

=== Galman Empire ===
- General Geidel (ガイデル, Gaideru) (Admiral Smeerdom) (v.a. Hidekatsu Shibata): Eastern District Army Commander.
- Commander Dagon (ダゴン, Dagon) (v.a. Mugihito): A very skilled Galman fleet commander.
- General Histenberger (ヒステンバーガー, Hisutenbāgā) (Smellen) (v.a. Mikio Terashima)
- Keeling (キーリング, Kīringu) (v.a. Yoshito Miyamura): Imperial Army Chief of Staff.
- Flakken (フラーケン, Furāken) (Luchner von Ferrell) (v.a. Tamio Ōki). The Galman Empire's top submarine commander, nicknamed "The Galman Wolf". He appears earlier in 2199 as a redesigned character.
- Helmeyer (ヘルマイヤー, Herumaiyā) (Nayzmayo) (v.a. Masaru Ikeda): Scientist who works with Frauski.
- Gustav (グスタフ, Gusutafu) (v.a. Eiji Kanie): Honorable warmonger who loves nothing more than the glory of battle. Attacks Yamato, then dies defending it. He dies lamenting never getting to fight them properly, whilst saluting Kodai.
- Dr. Frauski (フラウスキー, Furausukī) (Major Cranshaw) (v.a. Shojiro Kihara): Frauski is one of the more likable Galmans. He is scholarly and reserved. He is commissioned by Dessler to find a way to restore the normal conditions of Earth's Sun. Failing in this, he cannot return to Dessler honorably, and so crashes his ship into the Sun.
- Heigel (ハイゲル, Haigeru) (v.a. Shingo Kanemoto)
- Gehlen (ゲーレン, Gēren) (v.a. Hajime Koseki)

=== Space Battleship Yamato 2199 ===
- Abelt Dessler
  - Voice actors: Kouichi Yamadera (Japanese), Chris Rager (English)
- Redof Hyss: Otherwise Dessler's accommodating right-hand, he was outraged by his actions when Dessler tried to sacrifice the people of its capital by plunging part of his orbiting "new capital" in an effort to destroy the Yamato. He eventually ordered a stop to all Garmillan resistance against the Yamato when Dessler was presumed dead. He also vouched for the Yamato when Queen Starsha evaluated its performance because of its use of the Wave Motion Gun.
  - Voice actors: Yōsuke Akimoto (Japanese), Ray Gestaut (English)
- Miezela Celestella: Last survivor of the Jirel race, and Dessler's minister of propaganda. She is fiercely loyal to him, but he accidentally killed her when he infiltrated the Yamato.
  - Voice actor: Minori Chihara (Japanese)
- Melda Dietz: A Garmillan fighter pilot (rank: Lower Storm Leader) who is held in custody aboard the Yamato for a short time; to the crew's dismay, she reveals that Earth drew first blood in the conflict. After a period of animosity, she befriends Akira Yamamoto. She is later released and returns to the homeworld to take part in an uprising. She later becomes a liaison for the rebel Garmillan forces aboard the Yamato until she stayed on Iscandar to help Princess Yurisha with the Garmillans.
  - Voice actors: Shizuka Itou (Japanese), Katelyn Barr (English)
- Elk Domel: In this series, he is depicted just like in the original, but he is much more serious and was realistically close to defeating the Yamato. However, despite openly avoiding it, he is eventually dragged into Garmillan politics when, just as he's about to finish the Yamato, he lets them go because he and his fleet were recalled to their homeworld so that he could stand trial for the attempted assassination of Dessler. He is also depicted in the series as a soldier who praises his opponents, and just as tenacious as Captain Okita.
  - Voice actors: Akio Otsuka (Japanese), J. Michael Tatum (English)
- Elisa Domel: In the series, Elk is married to her, who is part of an anti-government group and got herself incarcerated on a prison planet, only to join Admiral Dietz's rebel forces later.
  - Voice actors: Chiaki Takahashi (Japanese), Kate Oxley (English)
- Wolf Flakken: Captain of the extra-dimensional submarine UX-01. A skilled hunter and a loose cannon, he stalks the Yamato extensively even after it detects and damages his ship. He is even considered by his peers as an uncontrollable captain loyal only to Dessler. He joined the rebels when Dessler was presumed dead when Second Baleras was destroyed.
  - Voice actors: Nakata Jouji (Japanese), David Wald (English)
- Herm "Sideburns" Zoellick: Loudmouthed Inspector-General of the Garmillas Central Army, who plotted to assassinate Dessler and take control of the Empire. An enraged General Goer shot him in the back.
  - Voice actors: Norio Wakamoto (Japanese), Jim Johnson (English)
- Saleluya Larleta: Commander of the Garmillas base on the floating continent above Jupiter; dies when the Yamato destroys the continent during a test of the Wave Motion Gun.
  - Voice actor: Hiro Yuuki (Japanese)
- Wals Lang: The commander of a Garmillas ship that was lost in the fourth dimension. His ship was destroyed by General Goer.
  - Voice actor: Tooru Ookawa (Japanese)
- Paren Nelge: An Imperial Guard officer who is posted to Wals Lang's ship. He tried to interfere with the rescue mission involving the Yamato, causing momentary confusion and even led Melda and Akira into a scuffle. He was killed before he could proceed any further.
  - Voice actor: Takashi Onozuka (Japanese)
- Hilde Schultz: Commander Walke Schultz's daughter. A full Garmillan citizen (her status is a reward due to her father's death), she ends up as a servant girl in Dessler's palace.
  - Voice Actor: Ayano Miura (Japanese)
- Walke Schultz: Commander of the Pluto Forward Base that sends the planet bombs. He is portrayed in the series as a more competent commander who actually nearly defeated the Yamato, though he and the rest of his Zaltzi crew are also preoccupied with their place in Garmillan society, to a point that they bypassed regular channels (that is, by avoiding to mention anything to General Goer) just to report their "victory" to Dessler. He and his remaining crew were killed trying to pursue the Yamato out of revenge.
  - Voice actors: Yu Shimaka (Japanese), Mark Stoddard (English)
- Guelph Ganz: Shultz's assistant.
  - Voice actors: Chō (Japanese), Tyson Rinehart (English)
- Wol Jarletora: Another of Schultz's men who was with Schultz since his days under General Domel's command. He covered Schultz's retreat after the destruction of Pluto Base, only for him to be killed after the Yamato destroyed his ship.
  - Voice actors: Daisuke Egawa (Japanese), Hunter Scott (English)
- Welte Talan: Chief of General Staff and head of weapons research. His design is based on General Talan's design from Yamato I.
  - Voice actors: Yutaka Aoyama (Japanese), Chuck Huber (English)
- Ghader Talan: Vice Chief of General Staff and younger brother of Welte Talan. His design is based on General Talan's design from Yamato II onward.
  - Voice actors: Koutarou Nakamura (Japanese), Brad Jackson (English)
- Mirenel Linke: Along with Celestella, a survivor of the telepathic Jirels until she is rendered braindead in an attempt to stop the Yamato.
  - Voice actor: Akemi Okamura (Japanese)
- Liber Droppe: Governor of Alteria, he is killed by Gimleh after failing to stop a rebellion.
  - Voice actor: Akira Harada (Japanese)
- Hydom Gimleh: Information officer of the Imperial Guard. He is just as ruthless in implementing Dessler's policies, ranging from sending dissidents to prison planets to wiping out a rebelling civilization.
  - Voice actors: Junpei Morita (Japanese), John Gremillion (English)
- Gul Dietz: Supreme Commander of Astrofleets, and Melda's father. He is incarcerated on Leptapoda for being a co-accused in the attempted assassination of Dessler, only to be freed by his daughter Melda and eventually becoming the leader of the Garmillan rebels and taking over the prison planet.
  - Voice actors: Katsunosuke Hori (Japanese), Ben Bryant (English)
- Garamond Goer: A loudmouthed yet cowardly Garmillan general who is fond of Garmillan politics and trying to impress Dessler. He is the commander of the Milky Way Theater of Operations (thus the commander of Pluto Base) until General Domel replaced him for failing to stop the Yamato. Despite his behavior, he is still a capable commander and soldier, even shooting General Zoellick upon knowing of his treachery. He was killed when, while on a mission to lure the Yamato into the hyperspace corridor, General Flakken's submarine sunk his and his fleet's ships.
  - Voice actors: Masashi Hirose (Japanese), Barry Yandell (English)
- Nolan Oschett: A Zaltzi Corporal in charge of escorting Yuki while under the custody of the Garmillans. He develops a crush on her.
  - Voice actors: Tetsuya Kakihara (Japanese), Justin Pate (English)

== White Comet Empire Gatlantis ==
The people of the White Comet Empire Gatlantis (白色彗星帝国ガトランティス Hakushoku Suisei Teikoku Gatorantisu) appear in the second season; like the Gamilons they are identical to humans aside from their green skin.

- Great Emperor Zworder (ズォーダー 大帝, Zwōdā taitei) (Prince Zordar): Zworder the Great of Gatlantis the undisputed leader of the Comet Empire, Zworder's sole aim in life is to conquer and subjugate the Universe. To this aim, he travels space in an enormous city-planet, Gatlantis, surrounded by a powerful plasma shield which resembles a gigantic comet, capable of annihilating planets in its path, and launching fleets of warships to conquer any useful worlds—or destroy them if they resist. Having subjugated the entire Andromeda Galaxy, his next target is Earth. Frustrated time and again by the incompetence of his minions—and interference from the mysterious Teresa of Telezart—he takes matters into his own hands at the end of the second season, launching a massive dreadnaught from the shattered remains of Gatlantis with the intent of destroying all life on Earth. His Japanese name is based on the English word "sword".
  - Japanese voice artist: Osamu Kobayashi
  - Italian Voice Artist: Ivano Staccioli
- Lady Sabera (サーベラー, Sāberā) (Princess Invidia): Zworder's mistress (his daughter in Star Blazers), though unlike other citizens of the Comet Empire she has pink skin. She has great ambition and is jealous of the favor Dessler has in Zworder's eyes; In which she works on plotting against him and Zworder to keep her place in the Empire. It is her treachery that ruins the Garmillan leader's plan to destroy the Yamato and the main reason the Comet Empire falls. In turn the Emperor never forgives his mistress:
- in the Japanese version Zworder leaves her behind in the destruction with Goenitz and Razela, while in the English version he only threatens to leave them behind.
  - Japanese voice artists: Noriko Ohara (Kazue Komiya in Arrivederci, Yamato)
  - American voice artist: Morgan Lofting, Melanie McQueen (Farewell Yamato: Voyager Entertainment Dub)
- Goenitz (ゲーニッツ, Gēnittsu) (General Dyre) and Larzeler (ラーゼラー, Rāzerā) (General Razlar Gorse): Members of Zworder's court and co-conspirators with Sabera to destroy Dessler's reputation, a plan which earns their Emperor's anger. When their plans enable the Yamato crew to cripple Gatlantis, Zworder abandons them to destruction aboard the doomed space station (not shown in Star Blazers).
  - Japanese voice artists: Ichiro Murakoshi and Kazuyuki Sogabe
- Mill (ミル) (Security Bureau Major Morta): A political commissar placed aboard Dessler's flagship, he reports to Sabera and her conspirators.
  - Japanese voice artist: Osamu Ichikawa
- Admiral Cosmodart Nazca (コズモダード・ナスカ, Kozumodāto Nasuka) (General Naska): Young leader of the Comet Empire's vanguard force to conquer the Solar System; initially scornful of the aging Earth ship Yamato, when defeated he begs Dessler for help, only to be turned away. Likely named after the Nazca Lines.
  - Japanese voice artist: Hiroya Ishimaru
- Admiral Gorland (ゴーランド, Gōrando) (General Torbak): Sadistic leader of the Comet Empire's missile fleet and famous hunter of dinosaurs. Despite being placed under Dessler's command at Telezart, he violates orders and engages the Yamato head-on, but his arrogance leaves him at the mercy of the Earth ship's wave motion gun.
  - Japanese voice artist: Shōzō Iizuka (Osamu Saka in Arrivederci, Yamato)
- General Zurvival (ザバイバル, Zabaibaru) (General Skorge): Scar-faced commander of a tank contingent stationed on planet Telezart to meet the Yamato, he faces Saito's space marines in intense ground combat. Fighting to the last man, he is killed in a pistol fight with Saito himself (toned down to simply being knocked out in Star Blazers). His Japanese name is based on the word "survival".
  - Japanese voice artist: Kosei Tomita
- Mazer (メーザー, Mēzā): A pilot captured by the Yamato, he refuses to answer questions—even under torture—but loosens up when Dr. Sado introduces him to sake. However, it is but a ruse to enable him to escape and return to his fleet, but they spurn him as a former captive. Such is his loyalty to the Comet Empire that he makes a kamikaze run into the Yamato, killing himself, rather than join the Earth crew.
  - Japanese voice artist: Ikuo Nishikawa
- Captain Destal (デスタール, Desutāru) (Major Hyrax): A sub-commander in Gorland's missile fleet, he refuses to allow the former captive Mazer to return and orders him to his death. This provokes a deadly attack from the Yamato which destroys him and his ships. Destal himself is killed when Mazer crashes into the bridge of his flagship.
  - Japanese voice artist: Masaru Ikeda
- Gerun (ゲルン, Gerun) (General Manic): Commander of the Comet Empire's carrier fleet. In the final assault on the Solar System he is stationed too far away from Valsey's battle fleet and is caught unawares by a full-scale attack by Earth fighter-bomber squadrons; unable to devise a strategy to resist the assault, he commits suicide in shame shortly before his ship explodes (the act of suicide is not shown in Star Blazers).
- Admiral Valsey (バルゼー, Baruzē) (General Turpis / General Bleek): In charge of the Comet Empire's main warfleet, stationed at Procyon and Sirius and thus missed by the Yamato during its journey to planet Telezart. As Gatlantis approaches our Galaxy, Valsey's fleet begins its advance on the Solar System, routing Earth's defences and very nearly driving home the invasion thanks to the main weapon of Valsey's flagship, the Flame Direct-Strike Gun ("Magma-Flame Gun" in Star Blazers), a wave motion gun which fires into a teleportation field. However, Hijikata leads them into the rings of Saturn, where the weapon proves to be a liability, and Valsey and his fleet are destroyed. In the dub he is accidentally split into two characters— Supreme Commander of a large fleet and Naska's commanding officer (Turpis), and the commander of the fleet that attacks Saturn (Bleek). He is named after "Bull" Halsey. Thanks to translation inconsistencies, Valsey is the most renamed character in all of Star Blazers. He has been called Valsey, Turpis, Razlar, Bulzur, Bleek, and even Naska in the Voyager dub of Farewell to Space Battleship Yamato, which calls the "Wave Motion Gun" the "Undulation Gun" among numerous other mistakes.
  - Japanese voice artist: Chikao Ohtsuka

=== Comico Comic Series ===
In the 80s, two volumes of a Star Blazers comic were published by the company Comico which were meant to bridge the gap between Star Blazers: The Comet Empire (Yamato II) and Star Blazers: The Bolar Wars (Yamato III), aligning with the explanation from the latter that planet Gamilon had been destroyed by "a remnant of the Comet Empire" rather than the Black Nebula Empire. The first of these two volumes including the following new characters:

- General Radnar
- Captain Tendor

=== Space Battleship Yamato 2202: Warriors of Love ===
- Gairen (ガイレン, Gairen): Zworder's clone predecessor and founder of the Comet Empire.
  - Japanese voice artist:
  - American Voice Artist:
- Emperor Zworder (ズォーダー 大帝, Zwōdā taitei):
  - Japanese voice artist:
  - American Voice Artist: Lady Sifar Sabera (サーベラ, Sābera): Pilot of the Ark of Destruction.
  - Japanese voice artist:
  - American voice artist:
- Gönitz (ゲーニッツ, Gēnittsu) and Larzeler (ラーゼラー, Rāzerā): High ranking members of Zworder's court.
  - Japanese voice artists:
  - American voice artists:
- Great Archivist Gairen (ミル, Gairen): Zworder's clone progenitor and chief intel archivist.
- Mill (ミル, Miru): Zworder's eyes and ears aboard Neu Dehuslar, later revealed to be Zworder's clone son.
  - Japanese voice artist:
  - American voice artist:
- Commander Cosmodart (コズモダード, Kozumodāto): Sub-Commander in the Eighth Mobile Fleet under Admiral Mazer.
  - Japanese voice artist: Tomoya Kawai
  - American voice artist:
- Admiral Mazer (メーザー, Mēzā): Commander of the Eighth Mobile Fleet. Following his exceedingly humiliating defeat in the Battle of Planet 11, he strayed from the Gatlantean way of suppressing emotions, chasing after the battleship Yamato to exact revenge. He and his fleet were deemed "contaminated" by Zworder, who ordered that they be exterminated by Abelt Dessler. His appearance is based on Destal and the original Mazer combined.
  - Japanese voice artist: Shigeo Kiyama
  - American voice artist:
- Admiral Gorland (ゴーランド, Gōrando): Commander of the Gorland Missile Fleet guarding Telezart. He is a fighter who considers contribution to the whole of Gatlantis to be the highest virtue, and considers familiar love to be egoic and even narcissistic.
  - Japanese voice artist: Kazuhiro Yamaji
  - American voice artist:
- Noll (ja:ノール, Nōru): Gorland's clone and intended successor.
  - Japanese voice artist: Takahiro Higami
  - American voice artist:
- General Zantz Zurvival (ja:ザンツ・ザバイバル, Zantsu Zabaibaru):
  - Japanese voice artist:
  - American voice artist:
- Admiral Valsey (バルゼー, Baruzē): Valsey is an officer in the Gatlantis Space Fleet, and commander of the Seventh Mobile Fleet under Emperor Zworder.
  - Japanese voice artist:
  - American voice artist:

== Black Nebula Empire ==
The people of the Black Nebula Empire, or Dark Nebula Empire (暗黒星団帝国 Ankoku Seidan Teikoku, lit. Dark Star Cluster Empire) live on the metal planet Dezarium in the Double Galaxy, a spiral galaxy 200,000 light years from Earth which is black on one side and white on the other. Although humanoid, they are in fact mostly bionic, having given up the pleasures of human flesh in exchange for longevity. They appear in the movies Yamato: The New Voyage and Be Forever, Yamato.

- Daeder (デーダー, Dēdā): commander of the flagship Pleiades (Great Pleiades in Space Battleship Yamato 2205). When the Garmillas fleet attacks the Black Nebula forces mining their homeworld and cause the planet's destruction, Deider in turn attacks them and pins them down in the seas of Iscandar. When the Yamato attacks, he attempts to position his ship between the Earth vessel and Iscandar to discourage use of the Wave Motion Gun, but is destroyed when Iscandar moves to safety due to volcanic eruptions.
  - Japanese voice artist: Kōsei Tomita
- Mœlders (メルダーズ, Merudāzu): Supreme commander of the Black Nebula Empire's forces in the Large Magellanic Cloud, leading from his massive space fortress, the Autoplanet Gorba, which fights off both the Yamato and Dessler's fleet.
  - Japanese voice artist: Kōji Nakata
- 2nd Lt. Alphon (アルフォン少尉, Arufon shōi): An intelligence and technology officer in the Dark Star Cluster Empire's invasion of Earth, he gains his own quarters on the conquered planet, and saves the life of a wounded Yuki, with whom he falls in love. When she proves unable to return his affections, he releases her to join a human resistance movement, and vows that if she defeats him next time they meet, he will help her to stop the invasion. In the end, he is mortally wounded by another soldier, but he dies in Yuki's arms, confessing to her that life has been empty and meaningless for his people since their conversion to bionics.
  - Japanese voice artist: Nachi Nozawa
- Divine Leader Skulldart (聖総統スカルダート, Seisōtō Sukarudāto): Leader of the Black Nebula Empire.
  - Japanese voice artist: Tōru Ōhira (Series), Banjō Ginga (PS2 games)
- Sada (サーダ, Sāda) Ally of Skulldart who, similarly to Sabera, resembles a white Earthling—even after Skulldart's façade is burned away.
  - Japanese voice artist: Yumi Nakatani
- Kazan (カザン, Kazan) Threatens the Earth Government with the Hyperon Bomb.
  - Japanese voice artist: Mugihito
- Commodore Grotus (グロータス准将, Gurōtasu junshō): Commander of the Gorba fleet.
  - Japanese voice artist: Banjō Ginga

=== Argo Press Comic Series ===
It's worth noting that, according to the character Karl Ryder, this version of Dezarium's behaviors and cultural patterns "bear a startling similarity to pattern's we've seen before...From the Gamilons. Language analysis so far confirms this..."

- 2nd Lt. Alphon Kihman:
- Lieutenant Commander Kazan da Prosht: Commander of the Earth invasion and Patriarch of the Prosht Clan, which includes Alphon.
- Sergeant Vlohm: Member of Alex Wildstar's Execution Detail.
- Holy Emperor Skaldart: Apparent ruler of Dezarium, superior to Kazan and Mœlders. Refers to himself as "Your Steward" when speaking to Dezaria, Queen of the Dead.
- Dezaria, Queen of the Dead: True ruler of the Dark Nebula Empire. Almost certainly based on the face that appears when the false Earth is destroyed, revealing the true Dezarium.

=== Space Battleship Yamato 2205 ===
- Daeder (デーダー, Dēdā): Commander of the flagship Great Pleiades. When the Garmillas fleet attacks the Black Nebula forces mining their homeworld and cause the planet's destruction, Deider in turn attacks them and pins them down in the seas of Iscandar. When the Yamato attacks, he attempts to position his ship between the Earth vessel and Iscandar to discourage use of the Wave Motion Gun, but is destroyed when Iscandar moves to safety due to volcanic eruptions.
  - Japanese voice artist: Kōsei Tomita
- Mœlders (メルダーズ, Merudāzu): Supreme commander of the Black Nebula Empire's forces in the Large Magellanic Cloud, leading from his massive space fortress, the autoplanet Gorba.
- "Voice in Heaven": Spooky voice from the red light, replacing Skulldart from the original series.

=== Be Forever Yamato: Rebel 3199 ===
- Mother Dezarium (マザー・デザリアム, Mazā Dezariamu): The true supreme authority of Dezarium, a supposed strategic AI. Her voice actor is the same one who played Sasha Kodai in the original.
- Divine Leader Skulldart (スカルダート聖総統, Seisōtō Sukarudāto): Leader of the Black Nebula Empire, which is actually Earth nearly a thousand years in the future, under Mother Dezarium.
- 2nd. Lt. Alphon (アルフォン少尉, Arufon shōi): Intelligence officer, a somber and melancholy personality. As a "non-standard" Dezarian, he feels deeper and truer emotion than the rest of his kin, including love and dread, and he has dreams and nightmares. He is fond of Yuki Mori.
  - Japanese voice artist: Makoto Furukawa
- Isidore (イジドール, Ijidōru): Alphon's servant. Small of stature and boyish, stern and unfriendly to Yuki (but obedient), and sort of reverent of Alphon.
  - Japanese voice artist: Shun Horie
- Lambell (ランベル少佐, Ranberu): Captain of the Giant Battleship Glodez. An energetic personality, one of three surviving "non-standard" Dezarians, alongside Alphon.
  - Japanese voice artist: Takuya Eguchi
- Kazan: Dickwad
- Saada:
- Bressol:
- Maxim: Scientist, guardian of Fleur, and one of three surviving "non-standards." He, Alphon, and Lambell all share a close bond.
- Fleur: Young Dezarian posthuman classmate of Tsubasa Kato, and child/ward of Maxim. She seems to be coming to understand emotion...

== Bolar Federation ==
The people of the Bolar Federation appear in the third season.

- Premier Bemlarzze (ベムラーゼ, Bemurāze) (Prime Minister Bemlayze): Prime Minister of the Bolar Federation.
- General Golsakof (ゴルサコフ, Gorusakofu): High ranking officer who reports directly to Bemlayze. Likely named for Sergey Gorshkov.
  - Japanese voice artist: Tesshō Genda (or Junpei Takiguchi?)
- General Balcom (バルコム, Barukomu):
  - Japanese voice artist: Shōzō Iizuka
- General Harkins (ハーキンス, Hākinsu) (Major-General Barphin Balsiky)
  - (v.a. Masaru Tanaka)
- Governor-General Borroughs (ボローズ, Borōzu) (Brozof/Lobo): Governor of planet Berth. In 2205, he is the governor of planet Galman.
  - Japanese voice artist: Masaru Ikeda
- Captain Levars (レバルス, Rebarusu) (Justin Liberatus): Commander of Berth's defenses.
  - Japanese voice artist: Tomomichi Nishimura
- Captain Ram (ラム, Ramu): Bolar commander who seeks aid from the Yamato- though only to recuperate before resuming his hopeless battle.
  - Japanese voice artist: Akira Kimura

=== Space Battleship Yamato 3199 ===
- Grand High Commissioner Belm von Bemlarzze (ベルム・フォン・ベムラーゼ, Bemurāze): New leader, ever since the revolutionary struggle which overthrew the Bolar Empire.

== Dingir ==
The people of the planet Dingir (also romanized as Dinguil), who appear in the movie Final Yamato, are descendants of Sumerians rescued from Earth by unknown aliens (whom they now regard as gods) during The Great Flood 10,000 years ago. They developed an advanced empire (as well as grey skin) on their new homeworld they named Dingir and have become extremely arrogant and militant. Most of them were wiped out when their homeworld was flooded by the planet Aquarius.

- Divine Emperor Lugāl (ルガール大神官大総統, Rugāru Daishinkan Daisōtō): Supreme leader of the Dingirians, he escapes his drowning homeworld aboard the enormous space station Uruk. He is impassive when told his wife and younger son perished, believing that only the strong should survive, and decides that Earth should become the new home of his people, planning to use Aquarius to flood it. Spurning the very idea of "charity", he sets about exterminating the human race, ensuring it cannot even leave Earth before flooding. He kills his own elder son when the latter fails to destroy the Yamato, shows no concern when he accidentally shoots his younger son, and self-destructs Uruk—killing all living within its city—when its purpose has been served. He is also seen to ride into battle (aboard a mechanical horse) alongside his troops. The word Lugal is Sumerian for "king".
  - Japanese voice artist: Taro Ishida
- Lugāl du Zāl (ルガール・ド・ザール, Rugāru Do Zāru): Elder son of the Dingirian leader, a young military commander who shows no mercy to his enemies, and has no qualms about firing on unarmed civilian transports, or even rescue ships tending to the wounded. However, when defeated by the Yamato (as well as a fleet of Earth warships) he is humiliated before his father, and becomes ever more determined to destroy the Earth ship, but when the rest of his fleet is destroyed, he turns tail and flees the battlefield, only to crash into the Neutrino Beam Shield of Uruk. It is possible that "Lugal de Zahl" is meant to translate as "Lugal II"—while it more closely translates to "Lugal the Number" or "Lugal of Number".
  - Japanese voice artist: Masane Tsukayama
- Dingir Boy (ディンギルの少年, Dingiru no Shōnen): The younger son of the Dingirian leader, and the only survivor of the drowned homeworld rescued by the Yamato crew. He stows away aboard the Earth ship when it sets off to fight de Zahl's fleet, hoping to learn more about humanity. He learns the alien concept of self-sacrifice when he sees another warship take a deadly missile hit for the Yamato; he is so impressed that he jumps in front of Kodai and is shot by his own father. His real name is never given and is just called Bōya.
  - Japanese voice artist: Kazue Ikura

== Great Urup United Star Systems ==
Great Urup United Star Systems (大ウルップ星間国家連合軍 Dai Uruppu Seikan Kokka Renpō Gun)

=== SUS ===
The Spacemen United Systems (異星人連合 Iseijin Rengō) are the antagonists in Space Battleship Yamato: Resurrection.

- Admiral Metzler (メッツラー提督, Mettsuraa Teitoku): Metzler is at the head of the SUS, which is technically the leader of the Interstellar Alliance. He systematically deceived all members of the Interstellar Alliance into thinking the Earth is into invading their territories. One member sees through his deception, and, with help from members, the Yamato found a way to defeat the SUS. He later appears to the crew of Yamato as an interdimensional being responsible for the black hole that threatened Earth.

- Voice actor: Hiroshi Yanaka

- President Ballsman (バルスマン総司令官, Barusuman Sōshireikan): Officially the Commander-in-Chief of SUS, though he acts more as Metzler's second-in-command.
  - Voice actor: Shōzō Iizuka

=== Amarl ===
アマール星 (Amaaru-sei)

- Queen Iliya (イリヤ女王, Iriya Joō): Queen Iliya is the reigning monarch of the planet Amarl, the planet that gave the fleeing citizens of Earth refuge. They were caught in double jeopardy since they are a member of the Interstellar Alliance, but only because of the protection the Interstellar Alliance offers in exchange for resources only available on their planet. Inspired by the Yamato, they declared themselves independent, triggering a war against the SUS-led Interstellar Alliance.
  - Voice actor: Atsuko Tanaka
- Admiral Pascal (パスカル将軍, Pasukaru Shōgun): Admiral Pascal is the leader of Amarl's space naval forces. After advising Captain Kodai and the Yamato to leave in order to avoid angering the Interstellar Alliance under the SUS, he was inspired to support Queen Iliya and the Yamato in open revolt against them.
  - Voice actor: Kazuhiko Inoue

=== Etos ===
エトス星 (Etos)

- Admiral Gorui (ゴルイ将軍, Gorui Shōgun): Admiral Gorui is the leader of the space naval forces of the planet Ethos, a member-planet of the Interstellar Alliance. Seeing the senseless massacre of the First and Second Earth Emigration Fleets on orders of the SUS, he began to doubt the motives of Metzler. His suspicions are confirmed during his first encounter with Captain Kodai and the Yamato, and, despite threats of wiping out the entire planet Ethos, helped them and the kingdom of the planet Amarl in open revolt against the SUS. He used his flagship in a kamikaze attack on Metzler's own flagship in an attempt to kill him.
  - Voice actor: Masatō Ibu
- Captain Seagull (シーガル艦長, Shiigaru Kanchō): He is captain of Gorui's flagship.
  - Voice actor: Takehito Koyasu

== Cancelled Disney Script ==
In the mid-1990s, Walt Disney Pictures optioned the rights with the intent to produce a Star Blazers live-action movie from producer Josh C. Kline. An early draft of the script by Oscar-nominated writer Tab Murphy was leaked on the Internet in the late 1990s, and was widely regarded by fans as a disappointment. The story was a retelling of the Season One plot, and followed a ragtag crew of misfits (most of whom are not named after any of the original series' crew) aboard the rebuilt United States battleship Arizona on a mission to save Earth. The project was abandoned by Disney following the departure of David Vogel, Disney's President of Production.

=== Earth ===
- Major-General Rafe Kogen: Charismatic Commander-in-Chief of the Star Force, a term which now applies to the entire defense force rather than the branch sent into interstellar space. They are also described as "resistance fighters," despite the fact that the Gamelons are not occupying the Earth, only bombarding it with planet bombs. Kogen himself is more than likely based on Heikuro Todo, and is depicted mostly the same as him in the script.
- Colonel Stone: Similarly to the original General Stone (Kotetsu Serizawa), Murphy's Colonel Stone, is a Star Force staff officer under the command of General Kogen. Unlike the original Serizawa/Stone, he is described as an Englishman and is actually the one to suggest stealing Arizona, rather than being infuriated by such insubordination. This course of action is also apparently counter to his own treasonous interests, as he is actually a spy working with the Gamelons. Fans have described him as a "vessel for contrivance."
- Derrick Wilder: Based roughly on the personality of Derek Wildstar/Susumu Kodai. Derrick was at least 20 years old when his parents were killed, rather than a child in early adolescence. He and Alex are only two years apart, rather than the roughly ten year age difference of the original. Unlike in the original, where Susumu felt he was alone in the world, and that no one would miss him if he died in battle, he now has a little sister named Erika, whom he is responsible for. Derrick also never outgrows his collective hatred of the Gamelons, nor does he come into his own as a leader because he is an effective one from the start of the voyage, which begins a little after halfway into the script.
- Erika Wilder: The younger sister of Derrick Wilder. Wild and hotheaded, she is a miniature version of her older brother from the original. When the Arizona takes off, she stows away aboard it.
- Alex Wilder: The older brother of Derrick Wilder—only two years older than him at 27. While his personality is well portrayed in the script, his death is delayed until page 39 of 127—roughly a third of the way into the script. Notably, his death is not a sacrifice like the original Alex Wildstar/Mamoru Kodai, instead he is lured into a trap and outmaneuvered by an opponent. His last words
- Jo Ashton:
- Lance: Alex's co-pilot, named after Frederick Lance (Akira Nemoto). A southerner.
- Knox:
- Kato:
- Orion:
- Rodriguez: Communications Officer. In the script, he is the only member of the Defiant crew who receives no proper description aside from his job of "Communications Officer." Notably, he is the human who aggravates the Thrid by murdering one of them, and is killed by them.

=== Peaceful Race ===
The Female Alien from Iskandar describes her people as "technologically capable of warfare," but "by nature a passive, non-aggressive race."

=== The Thrid ===
Besides the Gamelons, the "peaceful race" of Iskandar, and the humans, another alien race appeared in the script, called the Thrid. The Thrid inhabit a planet called Sega, where the Arizona stops for repairs. They are described as insectoid and potentially aggravated if they sensed fear or aggression.

Although the Thrid required minimal persuasion to help them, and asked nothing in return, Rodriguez was frightened by them and shot one of them dead, prompting them to kill him in retaliation. The Thrid continued to watch their new alien occupiers carefully, still on edge from the sudden murder. After the humans were certain the Thrid were going to attack, they opened fire and massacred most of them.

After making it back to the ship, Dash cracked a one liner, and the Thrid were never mentioned again.

=== Gamelon ===
Gamelon is a planet in the galaxy of Iskandar, a distant galaxy so far away it has not yet been named by human science. It is only 148,000 light years, the same distance that the Large Magellanic Cloud is described as being in the original series, which is actually much closer than the real Large Magellanic Cloud. Despite lacking "lightspeed travel," Rafe Kogen says that "Our capacity for intergalactic travel is greatly limited. It could take years to reach your galaxy."

The Gamelons are described as an "aggressive race of humanoids," which is never refuted in any capacity. There are very few named Gamilon characters, and none of them are "good," as aggression and war are stated to be in their nature. This is in direct contradiction with the main themes of the original series, and is regarded by fans as an insult to the original work.

- Desslock: This character speaks similarly to Desslok, and is presumably based on him, but shares nothing else in common with him. He is the only pure Gamelon whom the script refers to properly and consistently by name.
- Volgar: The guard outside the DNA vaults, and the only Gamelon other than Desslock and Nova who is referred to by name.
- Nova: Referred to only as "Female Alien" for half of the script, often eroticized as "exotic." She is the only Gamelon depicted as "good" in the whole screenplay. This is due to her hybrid nature, as her mother belonged to a "peaceful, non-aggressive race" which was unable to fight back against the Gamelons despite superior technology. This is in direct contrast to the original series, which made a point of having Earthlings and the people of Gamilas being more or less the same, despite alien appearances, environments, and needs. This tied into the broader anti-war themes of the original, where the eventual destruction of planet Gamilas is framed as a tragedy, one that Kodai gives a long grieving monologue about.
