= Angry Sun =

Angry Sun may refer to:

- "The Angry Sun", an episode of Battleship Yamato III, an animated Japanese TV show
- "The Angry Sun", an episode of Star Blazers, the English-language adaptation of Space Battleship Yamato

== See also ==
- Angry Son, a Japanese film at the 21st New York Asian Film Festival
- Angry Son (band), signed to Skene! Records
- "Angry Sons", a 2015 song written by Sterling Fox
