= List of Star Blazers episodes =

Star Blazers consists of three television seasons. Each is an English-language adaptation of its Japanese Space Battleship Yamato counterpart. However, the Japanese saga entails more than just these three television seasons, and part of this missing portion of the saga occurs between Seasons 2 and 3.

== Series overview ==
Season	Episodes	Originally released	
Season	Episodes	First released	Last released
1	26	September 17, 1979	March 3, 1980
2	26	September 13, 1980	March 7, 1981
3	25	1984	December 4, 1984

== Episodes ==
=== Season 1 (1979–80) ===
Star Blazers Season 1 is a straightforward English language adaptation of the first Japanese Space Battleship Yamato television season. The plot opens in 2199, with planet Earth facing extinction within one year due to radioactive pollution caused by "planet bombs", the weapon of a blue-skinned, humanoid alien race known as the Gamilons. A message arrives from Queen Starsha of planet Iscandar, providing Earth with plans to build a superluminal engine and the promise that, if Earthlings can reach Iscandar, enduring what obstacles the Gamilons might put in their way, the Queen will give them a machine—the Cosmo DNA—that can neutralize the deadly radioactivity and restore the Earth's ecosystem. The challenge borne by the crew of the Yamato is to travel 148,000 light years to Iscandar and back to Earth in one Earth year.

List of Star Blazers season 1 episodes
No. overall	No. in season	Title	Original release date
1	1	"The Battle at Pluto"	September 17, 1979
In the late 22nd century, an alien race known as the Gamilons have attacked the Earth, bombarding it with radioactive bombs and forcing the population underground. However, the radiation is seeping into the planet; unless it's removed, Earth will become uninhabitable in one year. War with the Gamilons has also destroyed the Earth's space forces except for two ships – the Paladin, commanded by Alex Wildstar, and another ship, commanded by Captain Avatar. During a battle at Pluto, Avatar's ship is damaged. The Paladin gives Avatar's ship enough time to escape, but is destroyed in the process. This event becomes a major motivator for Derek Wildstar throughout the series. Meanwhile, a non-Gamilon alien ship is hit in the crossfire and crashes on Mars. Cadets Derek Wildstar, Alex's younger brother, and Mark Venture investigate and discover a beautiful, dead woman, ejected from the escape pod and clutching a message capsule. They return to Earth in Avatar's battleship, and Derek notices the absence of any other ships. On the way back, they learn of Alex's fate. After they return, Derek confronts Avatar about Alex, but Avatar says it was Alex's decision to remain. When the message capsule is decoded, it contains a message from Queen Starsha of planet Iscandar. Starsha says the messenger was her sister, Astra, and offers Earth the Cosmo DNA, a device which can remove the radioactivity. The message also contains plans for an advanced propulsion technology, dubbed the Wave Motion Engine, capable of faster-than-light travel. As the Earth Defense Command deliberates, a Gamilon recon plane is detected sniffing around the ruins of the sunken World War II battleship, the Yamato. Out of sheer boredom, Wildstar and Venture take a plane out (unauthorized) to investigate. However, the Yamato appears to be nothing more than a hunk of ruins, leaving the cadets puzzled as to why Gamilon would be interested in it.
2	2	"Carrier Attacks the Sleeping Yamato"	TBA
Cadets Wildstar and Venture return from their trip and are summoned to the Yamato, noticing that it looks brand new from underneath. When they board, they find themselves inside a newly modernized spaceship, commanded by Captain Avatar. Wildstar is eager to fight the Gamilons, but Avatar says that the ship's primary mission is to travel to Iscandar and return with the Cosmo DNA. However, Wildstar and Venture have little time to look around, as Gamilon planes attack the ship. Even though the ship is not prepared for an attack, Avatar orders it powered up, telling Wildstar to take over the weapons system and Venture to take helm control. As the ship breaks free of the Earth's surface, Wildstar aims the ship's main guns at the carrier. Avatar fires the guns, destroying the carrier. On Gamilon, Leader Desslok chastises his generals for their inability to distinguish an underground city from a space battleship. There are 364 days remaining before life on Earth is extinct.
3	3	"Ultra-Menace Missile"	TBA
To make the journey from Earth to Iscandar, Captain Avatar speaks before the assembled Star Force inductees asking for those willing to make the daring journey to come aboard. In response to his request, a number of volunteers elect to sign on for the trip, including cadets Wildstar and Venture; Nova, a nurse and radar operator; Sandor, an engineer and chief mechanic; Dr. Sane, ship's doctor; IQ-9, a robot with a sense of humour; and others. Meanwhile, Colonel Ganz, the Gamilon commander on Pluto, receives permission to test out the new Ultra-Menace Missile against the new Earth battleship. The newly formed Star Force crew manages to shoot down the missile and avoid the devastation left in its wake. With the fate of the Earth dependent on the success of the mission, the newly operational battleship is rechristened Argo, and departs on her first mission. Meanwhile, Wildstar, who harbours a grudge against Captain Avatar for his brother's failure to return safely from the Battle of Pluto, learns a shocking revelation about the Captain's own family life. Earth has 363 days left.
4	4	"Test Warp to Mars"	TBA
After escaping the Ultra-Menace Missile, the Star Force takes off from Earth and passes the Moon orbit. A Gamilon aircraft carrier is dispatched to intercept Earth's newest space battleship. In order to provide time for the Star Force prepare for their first-ever space warp, Wildstar takes a detachment of Black Tiger space fighters out to intercept the Gamilon carrier. Wildstar's efforts provide the needed time, and once the fighters are back onboard, the warp is initiated just as Gamilon missiles nearly reach it. The warp takes the Star Force from the Moon to Mars, however some damage is sustained during the transition. Avatar orders the Argo to land on Mars for repairs, while the crew takes the opportunity to play in a Martian snowstorm. On Gamilon, Leader Desslok praises the Star Force's determination to get to Iscandar even by such dangerous means as warp travel. Earth has 362 days left.
5	5	"Jupiter's Floating Continent"	TBA
On its way through the Solar System, the Star Force falls victim to Jupiter's gravity as the Argo is pulled down toward the planet. The Star Force manages to land the ship on a floating continent hidden in the thick methane sea of the gas giant. After repairing its energy storage unit, the Star Force crew gets the Argo flying again. Meanwhile, a Gamilon base on the floating continent attempts to attack the battleship. The missiles miss the Argo, but serve to alert the Star Force to the base's presence. Avatar orders the Star Force to fire the ship's Wave Motion Gun at the Gamilon base. However, the weapon is so powerful that it wipes out the entire floating continent! Gamilon's commander on Pluto, Colonel Ganz, reports on this unexpected development to General Krypt, only to be rebuffed by Krypt who does not believe that Earth possesses the technology to build such a weapon. Earth has 361 days left.
6	6	"Paladin"	TBA
An engine issue resulting from the use of the Wave Motion Gun results in a partial failure of the artificial gravity aboard the Argo. To address the problem, Avatar orders the ship to sail for Titan, where the mineral – titanite – needed to repair the energy-transmission unit can be found. Two teams are sent out on the surface of Titan, one to collect environmental samples, and the other to obtain the titanite. While the Argo holds orbit over Titan, the Gamilons take the opportunity to scan the battleship, and dispatch a local patrol to the surface of Titan in the hopes of capturing some of the titanite team crew – Wildstar, Nova and IQ-9. Wildstar and IQ-9 fend off two Gamilon tanks, and take out the Gamilon patrol team sent to capture them. In the process of doing so, Wildstar discovers his brother's ship, the Paladin, as well as his side-arm. Although initially hopeful that his brother Alex may have survived the crash landing, Wildstar soon accepts that he is dead. Back aboard the Argo, Avatar questions Wildstar as to the find, then informs the younger Wildstar that his brother will live on in him. Earth has 359 days left.
7	7	"The Reflex Gun, Part 1"	TBA
As the Argo approaches Pluto, Colonel Ganz, the Gamilon commander stationed at the base on the planet decides to lure in the Star Force to Pluto so he can destroy it and claim the glory of the kill. To execute the attack, the Gamilons launch a barrage of planet bombs toward Earth, and dispatch the fleet on Pluto to coax the Star Force towards the planet where Ganz hopes to strike the killing blow with the Gamilon's new Reflex Gun, a gun he believes is more powerful than the Wave Motion Gun. The plan works, as the Star Force sets sail for Pluto in hopes of stopping the missile bombardments against the Earth. Unfortunately, this places the Argo within the range of the Reflex Gun, and the weapon's first shot hits the Argo. Navigator Mark Venture manages to stabilize the Argo by using the rocket anchor and side thrusters to stop the battleship in the orbit of Pluto's moon. Thinking they are hidden from the Reflex Gun by the moon, the Star Force takes a moment to rest. But the Gamilons make use of reflector satellites in orbit around Pluto to strike at the battleship from the far side of the planet. They hit the Argo again, this time forcing it into Pluto's equatorial sea. The Star Force notices that the Reflex Gun's beam can not penetrate the water surface, but they cannot stay submerged forever. So a plan is devised to send out a strike force to destroy the gun, and Wildstar is put in charge of it. Earth has 356 days left.
8	8	"The Reflex Gun, Part 2"	TBA
Wildstar's strike force is dispatched to locate and destroy the Gamilon Reflex Gun. The team deduces that the gun must be located under the ice since it does not appear on their radar, which leads to the suggestion that team look for cooling towers to locate the gun. To aid in this effort, Avatar orders the Argo to repeatedly surface and submerge to lure the Gamilon commander into firing the gun. Eventually, Avatar and his crew locate the general area of the gun, and launch missiles in its direction to help the strike force find it. This works, and the team enters the Reflex Gun's cooling tower. With IQ-9's help, the strike force manages to bypass the booby traps and plant explosives on the gun. The explosion destroys not only the gun, but most of the Gamilon base. With the Reflex Gun now out of commission, Avatar orders the Argo to surface and prepare to finish off the Gamilon base. Shaken, Gamilon Colonel Ganz elects to retreat from the planet instead of staying to fight. Unsurprised at this development, Gamilon Leader Desslok orders Pluto's commander to engage the Star Force knowing that this will mean certain death for the Colonel and his men. Avatar's victory against the Pluto base provides some relief for the Earth by eliminating further planet bombing. Earth has 354 days left.
9	9	"The Asteroid Ring"	TBA
To make the needed repairs to the Argo, Avatar orders the battleship to sail for the asteroid belt remains of Minerva, the 10th planet in the Solar System – the first to have been destroyed by the Gamilons. To hide the battleship from Gamilon radar detection, Sandor devises a plan to cover the hull with asteroid fragments. Meanwhile, Colonel Ganz orders his fleet to locate and destroy the Argo. When the Gamilon fleet loses track of the Star Force, Ganz initially suspects the Earthlings of performing a space warp. But when his crew locate the Argo in the asteroid field, he seizes the opportunity to attack. To repel the Gamilon fleet, Sandor advises Avatar to reverse the polarity of the magnetized asteroid fragments covering the ship. This results in the creation of a defensive asteroid ring that blocks incoming Gamilon fire. When the Gamilon fleet closes in on the Argo, the battleship releases the revolving asteroid fragments, causing them to scatter in all directions. In their attempt to avoid being struck by the fragments, most of the Gamilon ships end up colliding with each other, resulting in the destruction of the fleet. Although its escorts are destroyed, Ganz's flagship is undamaged, and lurches directly toward the Argo on a collision course. To prevent the two ships from colliding, the Argo fires a rocket anchor into the Gamilon commander's ship, knocking it off course just enough to narrowly avoid impact. Ganz's flagship then careens into an asteroid and explodes. Earth has 338 days left.
10	10	"We will Return"	TBA
The Star Force are contacted by the Commander of the Earth Defence Force, who requests an update on the mission. Aware that this will be the last chance the crew will have to speak with anyone on Earth for quite some time, Avatar arranges for five minutes for each crewman to say farewell to his/her family before the Argo makes a warp out of Earth's solar system. One by one, the crew says their last good-byes, leaving both the crew and the families on Earth emotional. Although the crew has been given the opportunity to speak with their family members one last time, both Wildstar and Avatar are without a family to bid good-bye. Eventually, Wildstar ends up in Avatar's quarters, at which point Avatar invites Wildstar to share a drink with him before they depart the solar system. Earth has 315 days left.
11	11	"Desslok Mines"	TBA
Now that the Star Force have left the Solar System, Gamilon central command begins to take greater interest in them. We see Gamilons in their true, blue, skin colour for the first time as Leader Desslok strides into his court chamber. For his evening entertainment, Desslok's top generals have arranged a trap for the Star Force, littering the space into which they are flying with hundreds of the newly developed Desslok Space Mines. These Gamilon mines are motive, and quickly draw in upon the Argo, thwarting any attempt to evade. They are sensitive to electromagnetic waves, and will explode if they get too close to the ship. Pinned, the Star Force is brought to a complete stop. Will they escape? Earth has 311 days left.
12	12	"The Sea of Fire"	TBA
Desslok, getting some satisfaction out of seeing his inferior officers fail at their attempt to stop the Star Force with space mines, now offers his own solution: a matter-eating Ecto Gas. Desslok plans to use the gas, and an electromagnetic force net, to chase the Star Force into the corona of a red giant star, Voltan – The Sea of Fire. He is so confident of his new invention that he tells General Krypt not to bother reporting on the success, and strides off to his bedroom to dream of the conquest of other worlds. The Gamilons begin their offensive by ensnaring the Argo in a powerful electromagnetic space net, and then sending a volley of missiles. Captain Avatar suffers a black-out, which he attributes to an earlier battle wound, and fails to order their interception. Wildstar initiates it instead, without the order, leading to a later reprimand. The ship barely manages to pull out of the space net and evade the Gamilon missiles. Dr. Sane knows the real reason for Avatar's collapse – radiation poisoning. Privately, he urges Avatar to consider hospitalisation, a suggestion which Avatar adamantly rejects. With the Star Force's flight path restricted by the space net, the Gamilons then loose Desslok's Ecto Gas upon the Star Force from behind, forcing them to flee toward the Red Star of Voltan. There is no choice but to fly dangerously close to the corona, and the ship and crew are on the verge of melting. But the plan backfires when the Ecto Gas is drawn into the Sea of Fire, and the Star Force clears a safe path through the fire with a blast of the Wave Motion Gun. On Gamilon, Desslok rebuffs his aide General Krypt's suggestion that they send out interceptors, and instead suggests sending congratulations. He muses to himself, "How could the Star Force have escaped? It was a perfect trap!". Earth has 308 days left.
13	13	"The Gamilon Pilot"	TBA
On Gamilon, Leader Desslok interrupts his daily treasure pool bath to commission one of his best generals, Lysis, to defeat the Star Force before it gets too far out into space. Lysis welcomes the chance for some sport. Meanwhile, Derek Wildstar and Conroy, his second-in-command, capture a Gamilon pilot during a routine patrol mission. When Dr. Sane removes the pilot's uniform, the Star Force discovers that the Gamilons are just like humans, but with blue skin. The revelation is too much for Wildstar, who bursts in the examination room to confront the Gamilon. Derek has a series of flashbacks from his childhood, starting from the Gamilons bombing his home and continuing with his older brother Alex returning from school. When Alex is stationed at a space station on Great Island, Derek visits him. However, during their visit, their parents are killed by one of the Gamilon bombs. In the Argo's examination room, Derek struggles to avoid exacting his revenge on the pilot. Captain Avatar questions the pilot but learns nothing and orders the pilot released. In a goodwill gesture, Wildstar offers the pilot some food as he departs. Earth has 305 days left.
14	14	"Octopus Star Storm"	TBA
The Star Force has been standing still in space for several weeks, waiting for a huge space storm to subside, in hopes of finding a short-cut channel through the vast Octopus Star system which fuels the storm. The Argo's crew grows anxious, with everybody on edge, and several scuffles break out, including one between Derek Wildstar and Mark Venture. Nova voices her concerns about the fights to Captain Avatar, who says the ship is running low on food and that it's better for the crew to be fighting instead of wondering where their next meal is coming from. Meanwhile, Assistant Engineer Sparks begins to question the feasibility of the mission, and asks Orion to present a case to Avatar for simply finding a nice, quiet planet on which to settle. When the storm momentarily quiets down, Wildstar takes a fighter plane into the system. He finds a channel, gets halfway through, and prematurely concludes that the channel goes all the way through. Wildstar reports his findings, but after Venture chides him for not verifying whether the channel actually exists, they get into an argument and then a fist fight, which Nova breaks up. Meanwhile, Captain Avatar decides to act, ordering that a course be set through Wildstar's channel. After a very rough ride through the vortex, during which Wildstar helps Venture pilot the Argo, the Star Force appears on the other side of the storm. Wildstar and Venture stop fighting and congratulate each other on their successful teamwork. As the year 2200 dawns, Earth has 280 days left.
15	15	"Galactic Whirlpool"	TBA
General Lysis arrives at the Gamilon base on planet Balan, the half-way point between Iscandar and Earth. He is greeted with resentment by Balan's current, jealous commander, General Volgar, whom Lysis is to replace. Insult is added to injury when Lysis derides Volgar's taste in decoration. Meanwhile, the Star Force experiences a sudden loss of engine output, and soon determines that they have stumbled into the gravitational effects of a Galactic Whirlpool, a precursor to a black hole. Therein, amidst the wreckage of many other ships unable to escape the gravity pull, they spot a Gamilon destroyer. Lysis, who has set out from planet Balan in a 3000-ship armada to attack the Star Force, is disappointed to learn that the whirlpool will rob him of his prey. Wildstar is also disappointed when Captain Avatar overrules his suggestion to fight the Gamilon destroyer, and orders that they find a way to escape. The Captain's wisdom soon proves itself when the Star Force detects Lysis's armada. Lysis chases the Star Force into the dead zone of the whirlpool, where all ship energy is lost. From outside the zone, Lysis's fleet launches salvos at the helpless Star Force. There seems no hope until a miraculous infusion of energy is sent to the Argo by none other than Queen Starsha herself. The ship's instruments come to life once more, and the Wave Motion Engine builds up enough energy to perform a space warp. Later, back on Balan, General Lysis notes in his journal that the Star Force is a worthy adversary. Earth has 273 days left.
16	16	"Stop at Beeland"	TBA
The Star Force's food reserves begin running low, so the navigation crew locates an Earth-like planet nearby where foraging might be possible. Survey crews are dispatched to the planet, including a plane carrying Nova and IQ-9. IQ-9, it seems, is beginning to develop romantic feelings, and has fallen in love with Nova. An inappropriate confession of his feelings startles Nova, who ends up soft-crashing the plane in a jungle. They set out on foot to explore the area, and are soon captured by insectoid beings which resemble bees. The Bee People take the two to a holding cell while they deliberate what to do with them. IQ-9 seems to understand the local buzz, and informs Nova that there is civil unrest brewing, and that they have been captured by the rebel faction. The rebel Bees think that Nova and IQ-9 are Gamilons, and plan to use them in a plot against the Bee Queen whom they suspect is in league with the Gamilons. In fact, the Queen is supplying the Gamilons with Royal Bee Jelly in return for letting her stay in power. A Gamilon tanker ship arrives to pick up the jelly, and the rebels insist she disprove her alleged Gamilon loyalty by firing a cannon at the tanker, or else they will kill the captive "Gamilons". The Queen instead has her guards rush the rebels, and chaos breaks out. IQ-9 pledges to defend Nova unto destruction, and Nova begins to realise the depth of the robot's selflessness. Fortunately, it does not come to that, as Star Force commandos arrive and rescue Nova and IQ-9. Once back on the Argo, IQ-9 confronts Nova, and explains that even though he knows she does not return his love, that it is not wrong for a robot to love. Nova concedes that this is so. Earth has 267 days left.
17	17	"Balanosaurus"	TBA
After leaving the planet of the Bee People, the Star Force is on its way to Balan, the half-way point between Earth and Iscandar. The jealous Volgar, now demoted to being General Lysis's aide, decides to see if he can curry favour with Leader Desslok by defeating the Star Force on his own. Volgar employs a biological weapon which he had been developing prior to Lysis's arrival – the Balanosaurus. Using a mental telepathy device, Volgar forms a neural link between himself and billions of microscopic organisms collected from Balan. Under his control, they join into a giant super-organism, shaped like a salamander swimming through space. Meanwhile, the Star Force is cruising toward planet Balan. Captain Avatar is undergoing an operation to treat the effects of his radiation poisoning, and the remaining bridge crew are left to run the ship in his absence. Volgar and his support squadron fly out to the Star Force, and bring the Balanosaurus to bear. Without the Captain, Derek Wildstar is forced to make decisions on his own. He fires the Argo's main shock cannons at the beast, but they merely blast it temporarily into bits – the fragments rejoin! Finally, Wildstar resorts to the Wave Motion Gun, which incinerates enough of the creature's mass to destroy it. On Balan, Lysis goads Vulgar for his failure. Meanwhile, on board the Argo, a recovering Captain Avatar commends Wildstar for his actions and for taking the initiative to lead the crew when Avatar was unable to do so. Earth has 263 days left.
18	18	"Magnetron Wave"	TBA
The Star Force encounters an unmanned Gamilon fortress floating in space, which moves toward them. Sandor takes a plane to investigate, but the magnetron waves the fortress is emitting shake it to pieces. Realizing this is what could also happen to the Argo, Sandor and Wildstar approach the fortress with a special plane unaffected by the waves. Once inside, Sandor tells Derek about his brother Alex. Sandor and Alex were good friends at the academy, and Sandor admits he felt responsible for Alex's death because he was in charge of maintaining Alex's ship. When a robot nearly surprises the two, Sandor says that as a child, he discovered the consequences of acting foolishly when he got into an accident on an amusement park ride. Meanwhile, the Argo, suffering damage from the magnetron waves, prepares for a space warp which will take it out of danger, but leave Sandor and Wildstar behind. When Sandor and Wildstar reach the central computer, it injures Wildstar and captures Sandor. Sandor then tells Wildstar his arms and legs are bionic – a result of the accident – and can be removed. When they get to the entrance, Sandor says his bionic arms and legs are also bombs, but he can not trigger them any further than the entrance. Sandor orders Wildstar to get to a safe distance, then detonates the bombs, destroying the computer and stopping the magnetron waves. The Argo cancels the warp and Wildstar heads back to find Sandor. On Balan, General Lysis clenches a Gamilon cigar in his mouth, which Volgar is unable to light. He chides Volgar for the uselessness of his lighter and his space fortress. Back on the Argo, Sandor, sporting new arms and legs, greets Wildstar. Derek says that Sandor's resilience gives him hope that Alex is still alive. Sandor says that if so, it will mean just as much to him as it does to Derek. Earth has 260 days left.
19	19	"Communication Satellite"	TBA
While the Star Force is still on its way to planet Balan, Communications Officer Homer visits the Holography Room to view images of his hometown, but has an emotional breakdown, declaring, "It's all a lie!". Shortly thereafter, the bridge crew sees Captain Avatar communicate with the Earth Defense Command. The Earth Defense Command says that conditions on Earth are tough, but that they are getting by. However, once the transmission ends, Homer blurts out that they are all being deceived, saying that the Star Force has no idea where they are going. He then collapses and is whisked away to the infirmary. Venture says that Homer's actions may have been puzzling, but his concern is a valid one that is on everyone's minds. Captain Avatar replies that even though there is no guarantee of mission success, the Star Force is Earth's only hope of survival, and they owe it to Earth to believe in their mission. On Balan, General Lysis muses on the effectiveness of the communications relay satellite which he has planted to enable the Star Force to talk to Earth. The plan is to weaken the Star Force by allowing bad news from Earth to destroy their morale. Back on the Argo, Wildstar discovers Homer secretly making a call to Earth, during which Homer learned his father was very sick. Upset and homesick, Homer bolts, finds a space suit, and jumps out an airlock intent on floating back to Earth. What he floats to is, instead, the Gamilon relay satellite. His depression and delusion melt away as he realizes the danger this presents. Before long, Wildstar, leading a search party, locates Homer and rescues him. Wildstar hands Homer the firing controls and lets him blow the satellite to bits. Earth has 255 days left.
20	20	"The Artificial Sun"	TBA
The Star Force finally arrives at planet Balan, the half-way point to Iscandar, unaware that the Gamilons have a base there. Derek Wildstar and the Black Tiger squadron scout the area, noticing that Balan's sun seems to orbit the planet, and not the other way around. They then encounter missile fire from Balan, and discover the Gamilon base. When they return to the Argo, Wildstar suggests they destroy the base now, so they do not have to worry about it on the way back. As the Star Force begins to attack the Balan base, Wildstar asks one of the other bridge members to keep an eye on the sun, saying he has a hunch about it but will explain later. Meanwhile, General Lysis, who is with his fleet far out in space away from the planet, shoots an activation beam at what turns out to be an artificial sun. Lysis says he wants to trap the Argo between the sun and the base, even if it means sacrificing the base. Horrified, Volgar reports this to Desslok. As the sun forces the Argo closer to the Gamilons' Balan base, Wildstar points the ship toward the sun. Suddenly, the sun stops. Having heard of Lysis' plan, Desslok has ordered him to call off the attack. The delay gives the Star Force the time it needs to use the Argo's Wave Motion Gun to destroy the sun, fragments of which rain down on the Balan base and also destroy it. Lysis and his fleet retreat into space. Back on board the Argo, Wildstar explains how he suspected that the sun was not real. Captain Avatar then formally designates him the Argo's Deputy Captain, ceding some of the responsibilities of running the ship to him. Earth has 253 days left.
21	21	"Challenge of the Rainbow Galaxy"	TBA
After the disaster at planet Balan, General Lysis is summoned to Gamilon to stand trial for his failed operations. General Krypt, presiding over the hearing, delivers a unanimous verdict: a death sentence. But when he delivers the paperwork to Leader Desslok, Desslok refuses to sign them, and issues a pardon along with new orders. He knows that Lysis, reckless or not, is the only general capable of stopping the Star Force before it enters the Magellanic Cloud – the galaxy where Iscandar lies. Lysis assembles a special task force of three triple-deck fighter carriers, one battleship/carrier combo, and a command ship. Each carrier sports a specialised kind of plane: fighters, precision-bombers, torpedo planes, and one heavy bomber bearing a missile, called the Drill Missile, designed to be fired into the Argo's Wave Motion Gun muzzle. Lysis's command ship has a device called S.M.I.T.E (Space/Matter Instant Transforming Equipment), capable of causing fighter planes to undergo a space warp for a surprise attack. On the Argo, the Star Force receives an audio message from General Lysis proposing that they meet for a decisive battle at a nebula called the Rainbow Galaxy, just outside the Magellanic Cloud. This nebula contains several stars, each of which shine with a different colour, as well as a black gas cloud which is impenetrable to radar. After much deliberation, the Star Force decides to take up the challenge. Captain Avatar delivers a rousing speech, as the entire Star Force crew drinks a toast to the occasion using bottled spring water (saké, in the Japanese version). Preparations for the battle begin. Earth has 215 days left.
22	22	"The Battle of the Rainbow Galaxy"	TBA
The Star Force has arrived at the Rainbow Galaxy nebula. General Lysis's task force begins its attack by deploying fighter planes to lure the Star Force's Black Tiger squadron away from the Argo. The plan works, and once the squadron is away, the Gamilons launch precision bombers, and use S.M.I.T.E to teleport them into close range of the Star Force. The attack cripples the Argo's radar. The Black Tigers are recalled, and drive off the bombers, but not before the Argo suffers significant damage. Not relenting, Lysis next sends torpedo planes, warping them to the opposite side of the Argo. They inflict severe damage to the ship before being driven off, and nearly all of the Argo's gun turrets are destroyed. The Black Tigers then return to the ship for refuelling. Striking the final blow, Lysis teleports the Drill Missile bomber right in front of the Argo. The gigantic missile is dropped, and plows into the Wave Motion Gun, rendering the gun useless. The drill head penetrates into the gun's control room. With the Argo defenseless, the Gamilon fleet moves in close for the kill, and begins a close-range, ship-to-ship bombardment. The Argo's last remaining gun turret explodes, and the ship is utterly defenseless. But Sandor and IQ-9 manage to break into the missile, and with 30 seconds to detonation, switch some wires and make it back itself out. The Drill Missile flies backward, right into the Gamilon fleet, striking the very battle carrier from whence it came. The debris from the exploding ship strikes the other three carriers, wiping them all out. Only Lysis's command ship remains. Stunned at this turn of events, Lysis attempts to ram the Argo, chasing the Star Force into the black gas cloud. With the Star Force unable to see his ship, Lysis maneuvers beneath the Argo and grapples onto the lower hull. He contacts the Star Force by video to inform them that the battle is now over – he has placed a bomb against their hull. Captain Avatar tries to convince Lysis that the Star Force is no threat to Gamilon, but just wants complete its mission to Iscandar. For a moment, Lysis considers the matter, but he refuses to relent and starts the bomb timer. His ship ungrapples and moves away, but is heavily damaged in the ensuing explosion. As for the Argo, half of the underside is utterly destroyed, but still the lucky ship survives. Lysis's own ship is too damaged to continue the fight, and he returns to Gamilon in disgrace, knowing that unpleasantness awaits him. After holding a burial in space for those lost during the battle, the Star Force pushes on toward Iscandar. Earth has 214 days left. Note: The ending of this episode differs from the original Japanese version. In the Japanese, Lysis's ship itself is the bomb placed against the Argo's hull, and Lysis and his ship are destroyed in the explosion.
23	23	"Dragged to Gamilon"	TBA
As the Star Force enters the Great Magellanic Cloud, the galaxy in which Iscandar resides, they receive a strong radio signal which affects all of the navigation instruments. It turns out to be a transmission from Queen Starsha herself. She congratulates the Star Force on its brave journey, and instructs them to follow her guide signal to Iscandar. But once they enter visual range of Iscandar, the signal is cut off, and navigator Mark Venture makes an even more startling discovery. The video data indicates that there are two planets at Iscandar's location. Radar detects a group of missiles coming from Iscandar. The missiles detonate around the Argo, releasing a magnetic ferrite cloud which hovers around the ship. Analysis reveals that the missile fragments are of Gamilon origin. Wildstar then realises that one of the two planets must be Iscandar, but the other is Gamilon! On Gamilon, Leader Desslok's treasure pool massage is interrupted by a call from Queen Starsha. She chides the Gamilon leader for his unprovoked attack on Earth, but he explains that the Gamilons need to find a new home, and that Earthlings are not a sufficiently civilised race to worry about preserving. A short time later, Desslok addresses the Gamilon senate. He explains the plight of Gamilon, a semi-hollow planet which is volcanically unstable, with seas poisoned with sulphuric acid from the lava. Gamilon can no longer support humanoid life, so a new home is needed – Earth. Desslok's plan is to use a magnetic ray to drag the ferrite cloud, and the Star Force, to Gamilon, and into the sulphuric acid sea. On the Argo, shock waves are felt as Gamilon's magnetic ray is put to use. As planned, the ship is dragged helplessly into the seas on Gamilon. When the Star Force realises the danger of the sea, they take off, but not before the acid manages to melt the third bridge strut. The entire third bridge falls off and into the sea! The Gamilons then begin dropping depth charges on the Star Force, trapping them above the deadly seas below. Earth has 164 days left.
24	24	"The Battle of Gamilon"	TBA
Trapped between depth charge bombardment and the sulphuric acid seas of Gamilon, the Star Force desperately tries to find a way out. At his command centre, a building suspended from the ceiling of Gamilon's upper shelf, Leader Desslok monitors the battle's progress. He lashes out at General Krypt's offer to relax and have a drink. On the Argo, out of ideas, Wildstar seeks advice from Captain Avatar who suggests that they actually submerge the ship for 10 minutes in the acid sea, and seek out a volcano to disrupt using the Wave Motion Gun. After a few minor pieces of the ship have fallen off, IQ-9 spots the desired volcano. One hit from the Wave Motion Gun sends Gamilon into seismic upheaval. Desslok momentarily loses his sanity, exploding into a fit of uncontrollable hysteria at the irony of having drawn the Star Force to Gamilon to destroy them, only to have them turn the tables and destroy Gamilon instead. The Star Force ascends from the Gamilon sea. Leader Desslok orders the ceiling missiles above the central Gamilon city to be dropped upon the Argo. His aide, General Krypt, wigs out at this suggestion, knowing that it will destroy the city as well, and begs Desslok to end the battle and seek a truce. This earns Krypt a snide comment from the Leader (though in the Japanese version, it's a shot in the chest). Missile fire rains down on the Star Force, and so Wildstar orders the Argo to fly directly above the central city in hopes of discouraging further attacks. But this does not dissuade the Gamilons, and ceiling missiles drop like stones, wrecking the city and causing further volcanic eruptions. Gamilon's tectonic structure becomes unstable, and huge sections of the upper shelf collapse and fall upon the cities below. A shot from the Argo's main guns strikes Desslok's command centre, which plummets to the ground below. Desslok himself is covered in rubble, but falls through a trap door, his fate uncertain. Gamilon falls still and silent. Wildstar finds Nova weeping on the main gun deck, and declares that he believes that this was their last battle. The Argo, badly damaged, lifts off. As Captain Avatar delivers a message of congratulations to the crew over the public address, planet Iscandar comes into view. Earth has 161 days left.
25	25	"Iscandar"	March 3, 1980
After defeating the Gamilons, the Star Force lands at Iscandar, where Queen Starsha welcomes them. At first, she mistakes Nova for Astra, her sister, but Wildstar says that Astra did not survive her trip to Earth. He adds that Earth owes both Astra and Starsha a great debt for their help. As the Cosmo DNA is loaded onto the Argo, Starsha mentions that she has been taking care of a wounded Earthling who is now ready to travel, and she wants to send him back to Earth. The Earthling turns out to be Derek Wildstar's older brother Alex, and upon seeing his brother actually alive, Derek breaks down and embraces him. Meanwhile, Assistant Engineer Sparks kidnaps Nova and leaves with several others to settle on Iscandar. Trouble is, the island Sparks picks could, according to Starsha, be destroyed any minute. Derek Wildstar tries to reason with Sparks, then warn him of the danger, but Sparks blows off the warning. Immediately after, an earthquake and the resulting tsunami kill everyone on the island except for Nova. As the Argo prepares to depart, Starsha, who wants to remain on Iscandar because it's her home, tells Alex she loves him and runs off. At the last minute, Alex runs to Starsha, asking Derek to forgive him. Derek and Nova wave goodbye to Alex and Starsha, and the Argo blasts off for the return voyage to Earth, which has 131 days left.
26	26	"The Journey Home"	March 3, 1980
Having obtained the Cosmo DNA from Queen Starsha, the Argo begins the return trip to Earth. The trip is mostly uneventful, but when the Argo initiates one final space warp to bring it into the Earth's solar system, it narrowly misses a shot from the Desslok Cannon, a weapon similar to the Argo's Wave Motion Gun. Desslok orders an immediate warp to follow the Argo, but without time to calibrate, both ships collide. Desslok releases a radioactive sleeping gas, then leads a boarding party onto the Argo. Derek Wildstar leads a team to confront Desslok and finally meets the Gamilon leader face to face, but is partly subdued by the gas. Meanwhile, Nova, with Sandor's help, activates the Cosmo DNA to neutralize the gas, but the gas overcomes her and she collapses, comatose. Desslok retreats but promises Wildstar they will see each other again. His ship warps away before the Argo can fire. When Wildstar asks Sandor what cleared the gas so quickly, Sandor tells him what happened to Nova. However, when Nova does not wake up, Wildstar becomes despondent and goes to Captain Avatar for advice. Avatar consoles him, commending Nova's bravery and emphasizing the importance of hope. He then shakes Wildstar's hand one last time. As the Earth comes into view, Wildstar carries a still-unconscious Nova to the bridge. Just then, Desslok fires his cannon at the Argo. With the Argo unable to escape the shot, Sandor activates his latest invention – a reflector force field based on the Gamilons' Reflex Gun – which sends the energy from the cannon back to Desslok's ship. Desslok's flagship is destroyed, and his face disappears, engulfed in flames. In his cabin, Captain Avatar holds an old photograph of his wife and son as he views Earth with his own eyes. Seeing it, he is satisfied, and dies. Dr. Sane finds him dead, and is at first shocked, but quickly salutes. As Dr. Sane comes down to the main bridge to deliver the news, Nova begins to stir, and Wildstar takes her in his arms and dances with her on the bridge. The Star Force returns to Earth in 2200, with just over a month to spare.

=== Season 2 (1980–81) ===
Like its predecessor, Star Blazers Season 2 is an adaptation of the Japanese Space Battleship Yamato II television season. The plot opens in 2201, one year after the Star Force's successful mission to Iscandar. At peace and complacent, Earth receives a mysterious, extraterrestrial radio signal from Trelaina of planet Telezart which turns out to be desperate warning of a new enemy, the Comet Empire. The Comet Empire happens to be a race of green-skinned humanoids led by the evil Prince Zordar and his daughter, Princess Invidia. Their center of operations is a huge, mechanized fortress designed to resemble a giant comet. Cloaked in an enormous plasma field, the fortress is capable of obliterating entire planets by means of head-on collision, and it is quickly approaching Earth. Unknown to Earth, the Star Force's old enemy, Desslok of Gamilon, has joined forces with the Comet Empire, and is plotting his revenge. The Earth Defence Council (EDC) dismisses Trelaina's radio transmission, and the Star Force members, now assigned to other posts, are the only ones who believe there is a danger, and face the prospect of committing mutiny in order to defend Earth.

List of Star Blazers season 2 episodes
No. overall	No. in season	Title	Original release date
27	1	"Ambush at Jupiter"	September 13, 1980
The year is 2201, one year after the Star Force returned to Earth bringing the Cosmo DNA device which rid it of the radioactive pollution caused by Gamilon's planet bombs. Since that time, no longer threatened by outside forces, Earth has recovered and expanded its naval power and territory to the periphery of the Solar System. Most of the Star Force crew are assigned to various posts on Earth, although the Argo is currently on assignment as the flagship of the Solar System's peripheral defence patrol fleet. Commanding it is Deputy Captain Derek Wildstar. Unknown to Earth, a new threat lurks in outer space. In the palace of the Comet Empire – a huge mobile city fortress shrouded in a plasma field which makes it resemble a white comet – its green-skinned ruler, Prince Zordar, plans for his next conquest – Earth. His minions, daughter Princess Invidia, and Generals Dire and Gorse, gather to review the plans for the Earth, the defenses of which are deemed vastly inferior. An easy victory is predicted. But suddenly, a surprising voice pierces the air. Gamilon Leader Desslok steps out of the shadows of the throne room to chide the court for its overconfidence. They have failed to consider the Star Force. Invidia, immediately showing her disdain for the former Gamilon ruler, scoffs at this, asking whether this is the same Star Force which single-handedly wrecked Gamilon. Desslok scoffs at her arrogance, and insists that unless the Star Force is dealt with, the Comet Empire will be unsuccessful. He convinces Emperor Zordar to allow him to personally take care of the Star Force. Meanwhile, Comet Empire strike planes begin stealth attacks on Earth's defence patrol fleet. Wildstar takes his Superstar flighter out on a solo mission to chase the mysterious enemy, only to be called back to the ship which has been crippled by an enormous EMF surge which has passed through the Solar System. The surge burns up many of the Argo's electrical circuits, but the communication system holds out long enough to record a garbled radio message from an unknown source. Could it be related to this new enemy, they wonder. As the damaged Argo returns to Earth, it crosses flight paths with Earth's new flagship, Andromeda, commanded by Captain Gideon, on its maiden flight. Each captain masks pride with principle, and refuses to yield airspace. The two ships come within mere meters of collision. The Argo descends to Earth.
28	2	"Blackout"	TBA
As the Star Force reunites to honor Captain Avatar's memory, Derek Wildstar says that he scouted what he thinks is a new and potentially very powerful and dangerous enemy. He then goes to the Andromeda and confronts Captain Gideon, who turns out to be one of his former instructors, about the near-miss in space. Gideon says that even though the Argo had landing priority as a returning spaceship, it still would have had to yield to the Andromeda because the latter was Earth's highest-ranking starship. Despite Wildstar's protests, Gideon simply tells him he will "learn the hard way". Wildstar leaves Gideon's quarters along with former crewmate Sandor, who gives him a tour of the Andromeda, saying how computerized the ship is. When Wildstar asks about the radio message, Sandor plays it back; although mostly garbled, it appears to contain a woman's voice. Wildstar asks about the improvements to the Argo, and Sandor mentions that the Earth Defense Force wants the Argo just as computerized as the Andromeda. The news upsets Wildstar, who confronts the Earth Defense Council's commander, just as a massive blackout occurs. On board the Comet Empire, which was responsible for the blackout, Desslok tells Zordar that the Star Force will head to Telezart once they decipher Trelaina's message. Zordar puts Desslok in charge of handling Trelaina and the Star Force.
29	3	"Underground City"	TBA
Sandor and Wildstar try to decode the message Wildstar received, but the best either of them can determine is that it appears to be a jammed distress call vaguely warning the Earth of some sort of danger. Believing the message and the blackout may be related, Wildstar unsuccessfully tries to get the Earth Defense Force to listen. He then decides to take the Argo – unauthorized – out into space, even though he is not fully sure there is a threat to Earth. Wildstar sends a message to the old Star Force crew, emphasizing that their participation in this mission is strictly voluntary since the mission is not authorized. Sandor agrees to go, but Venture wants time to think it over. Nova is torn between letting Wildstar go and asking him to stay. Desslok meets with his former battle staff and has the Gamilon fleet go to Telezart to wait for the Star Force. Wildstar boards the Argo and is surprised when it powers up, then discovers Sandor and Orion on board. The rest of the old bridge crew, minus Venture and Nova, also join Wildstar on the Argo as it prepares to depart Earth.
30	4	"Battle Satellite"	TBA
The Earth Defense Force learns that the Star Force's personnel have abandoned their posts and are boarding the Argo. It sends a message to the Argo ordering those on board to leave the ship and return to their posts immediately. Derek Wildstar acknowledges the message, but says the Star Force is made up of volunteers, so the crew might not obey. Meanwhile, Mark Venture meets with Dr. Sane and Nova at Captain Avatar's memorial and discusses his concerns about whether or not to go. Sane replies that the Star Force itself is special – the crew is willing to take risks even if it's not sure of the outcome. The EDF's commander contacts the Argo one last time asking the Star Force to abandon its mission or risk being branded as mutineers, but Wildstar says they are taking off anyway. As the Argo begins to move, Venture appears on the bridge and handles the ship's departure. Meanwhile, the EDF, on its commander's orders, launches unarmed magnet missiles, two of which attach to the Argo. The ship starts its Wave Motion Engine and breaks free of the missiles. Using one of its battle satellites, the EDF tries to stop the Star Force, but the Argo destroys the satellite. The EDF's commander allows the Argo to enter space, secretly wishing its crew luck even though they are now considered rebels.
31	5	"Crossing the Andromeda"	TBA
As the Argo continues its journey to space, the trip is uneventful until the ship encounters three fighters from the moon's base station. Wildstar orders the bridge crew to their combat stations, then realizes that the fighter group is the Black Tiger squadron, led by his old crewmate Conroy. The Black Tigers have abandoned the moon base to join the Argo. Wildstar then discovers Nova on the ship. He admits he wanted her to stay on Earth for her own safety. Nova replies that she is also a Star Force member, and she wanted to go on the mission regardless of the danger. In the distance, Conroy sees the Andromeda and alerts Wildstar. Realizing the Argo is no match for the Andromeda, Wildstar heads for an asteroid belt near Jupiter. The Argo loses the Andromeda in the belt, but Gideon maneuvers his ship around the belt and meets the Argo on the other side. Gideon orders Wildstar to return, but he refuses. The Argo and the Andromeda approach each other on a collision course, but when Gideon sees the Star Force's determination to continue its mission, he holds his fire. Similar to their first encounter, the two ships narrowly pass each other, and the Andromeda lets the Argo continue. Gideon sends a message to the Argo complimenting Wildstar and the rest of the Star Force on their courage and dedication.
32	6	"At Planet Brumus"	TBA
Just outside the Earth's solar system, the Argo receives a distress call from nearby planet Brumus. Derek Wildstar recognizes the planes attacking the planet as the same ones that flew over Earth during the blackout. The Argo attacks the planes in outer space while Space Marines stationed on the planet make their stand. After defeating the enemy planes, Wildstar sends the Argo's Astro Fighters to the surface, where they destroy the enemy tanks and take the Space Marines on board. Sandor analyzes the tank remnants and verifies that the metal alloy comprising them is not that of Earth or Gamilon, thus Earth is facing a new enemy. Wildstar reports this to the Earth Defense Force commander, who pardons the Star Force and places them under his command.
33	7	"Sub-space Submarines"	TBA
The Space Marines cause a flurry of problems for the crew of the Argo, including disrespecting Nova's authority and literally creating a mess in the mess hall. Two sub-space submarines from the Comet Empire then attack the Argo. The Star Force destroys the submarines, but they still do not know what kind of enemy they are facing. Sandor has the ship land on a planet so the damage can be repaired. Meanwhile, the Argo's crew and the Space Marines get into a brawl and Wildstar and Sergeant Knox, the Space Marines' leader, get into a fist fight, which Dr. Sane breaks up. Dr. Sane says that Knox has to adjust to not only having been defeated at Brumus, but also to having had to relinquish command to Wildstar. On the Argo's bridge, the crew receive a garbled message from Telezart, but they are able to at least extract navigational coordinates from the message. The Star Force sets course for Telezart.
34	8	"Time Trap"	TBA
As the Star Force reaches the coordinates from Trelaina's last message, it receives a new message. The Argo warps to the new coordinates, but finds itself in the middle of a space cyclone. However, when the ship reaches the middle of the space cyclone, the Star Force finds the remnants of several ships that never made it out. The Space Marines grow restless. Dr. Sane prescribes the holography room as treatment for them. Meanwhile, the crew discovers that the center of the cyclone accelerates time, aging everyone's uniforms – and the ship – to where they are disintegrating. To make matters worse, a Comet Empire fleet has launched an attack on the Argo. Trelaina then radios new coordinates to the Argo, allowing it to exit the cyclone – and the time trap – and counterattack.
35	9	"Mazor"	TBA
Wildstar makes contact with the Earth Defense Force but reports he has not been able to find out more about the Comet Empire. The EDF says that so far, nobody on Earth knows that the Comet Empire is more than just a comet. The Star Force then sees a Comet Empire ship, and Wildstar orders that the pilot be taken prisoner. When Dr. Sane runs some tests on the captured pilot, he discovers that the data are nearly identical to one of the Argo's crew members. The Star Force tries to interrogate the pilot, but he refuses to talk. The pilot then escapes, but Wildstar orders the crew to let him go, then tracks the pilot to the Comet Empire's fleet. The Comet Empire refuses to allow the pilot to return. Wildstar radios the pilot, offering him asylum. Unsure of what to do, the pilot identifies himself as "Mazor" but crashes his plane into the side of the Argo, leaving the crew wondering if he had intended to land or attack. Wildstar then orders the Argo into the midst of the Comet Empire's fleet, and the ships destroy each other attempting to fire on the Argo.
36	10	"Asteroid Ring Defense Revisited"	TBA
As the Argo continues to Telezart, it receives another message from Trelaina warning them of a meteor swarm. The crew verifies the swarm, which proves that Trelaina intends to help them. Back on Earth, the large comet is expected to arrive in one hundred days, prompting Captain Gideon to request five more ships similar to the Andromeda. Earth's population also begins to get suspicious when all non-defense space flights are grounded. The Argo encounters the meteor swarm, discovering that the meteors are absorbing the ship's speed and slowing it down. It then encounters enemy fire and uses the meteors to create a defensive shield around the ship. However, the meteors form a whirlpool that drains the Argo's energy. Believing the ship defenseless, the Comet Empire fleet attacks again, but – thanks to Sandor – the Argo is able to use its Wave Motion Gun to defeat the fleet. The Star Force then receives a message from an old enemy – Gamilon Leader Desslok.
37	11	"Starflies"	TBA
While undertaking repairs, the Star Force come across glowing "starflies" outside the Argo. The crew bring many of them aboard in lanterns. Sandor discovers the starflies are actually a metal-eating bacteria released by the Gamilon fleet. The ship suddenly loses all gravity as a result of the bacteria. After a brief flashback where Desslok remembers his escape from the reflected shot of the Desslok Cannon in the previous season and rescue by the Comet Empire, he orders his carrier to launch fighters and attack the Argo. The Star Force are unable to launch fighters and are ineffective at shooting at the attacking ships. Desslok calls and taunts the Star Force during the attack. The Star Force restore gravity, but accidentally add too much, further paralyzing themselves during the Gamilon attack.
38	12	"The Tunnel Satellite"	TBA
Amidst the attack, Sandor and Royster repair the gravity control unit of the Argo. The Gamilon carrier prepares to fire upon the Argo, but they discover that the starfly bacteria damaged their weapons, and they retreat. Back at the Comet Empire, Prince Zordar expresses satisfaction at working with Desslok, while Princess Invidia is unconvinced. Invidia suggests to her generals that it may be in the interest of the Comet Empire to stop working with Desslok, despite Zordar's enthusiasm. The Argo approaches a tunnel satellite, with the crew thinking it is an ideal place to stop for repairs. After the Argo enters, the Gamilon fleet surrounds the satellite and turns on an electromagnetic field, trapping the ship. Royster suggests to Sandor that firing the wave motion gun will generate a recoil that pushes the Argo out. As Desslok prepares to fire upon the Argo, he is distracted by a call from Princess Invidia, falsely claiming Prince Zordar orders him to return immediately. Desslok refuses and fires upon the Argo, but the delay gives the Argo just enough time to escape. Desslok blames the Star Force's escape on Invidia's call. As the episode ends, the Star Force see Telezart for the first time.
39	13	"The Conspirators Meet"	TBA
As the Star Force approach Telezart, they find that the planet is hollow, and Trelaina says she is in a cave. Missiles from the surface fire upon the Argo. Wildstar dispatches the space marines to explore the surface and clear the way. When the space marines land, they find a large, deserted, mostly destroyed city. Desslok returns to the Comet Empire's ship with his fleet. When Prince Zordar asks Invidia why Desslok has returned, she lies and claims he gave up fighting the Star Force, and volunteers to speak with Desslok to get the full story. She meets with General Dire, who worries about what will happen if Zordar or Desslok discover their deception but agrees it is in the best interest of the Comet Empire. Invidia reports that she sent a tank battalion to Telezart. General Dire worries that Trelaina will help the Star Force defeat the battalion and their leader, General Scorch. Invidia suggests that Scorch is expendable, and his sacrifice was necessary to get Desslok away from the Star Force and Trelaina – otherwise Desslok could wreck their grand plan to take over the universe. The episode ends with the robot tank battalion attacking the space marines on Telezart.
40	14	"Second Day at Telezart"	TBA
Wildstar, Sandor and IQ-9 arrive to help the space marines fight against the Comet Empire tank battalion on Telezart. After an extended battle, the Star Force are victorious, and go in search of Trelaina. Back at the Comet Empire, Desslok figures out that Princess Invidia, and not Prince Zordar, ordered him back. Desslok attempts to leave, but Invidia arrests and imprisons him, denying him access to Prince Zordar. A general tells Prince Zordar of the defeat of General Scorch and his tank battalion and blames the defeat on Desslok's departure from Telezart. Princess Invidia adds that Desslok retreated out of fear of Trelaina. When Wildstar, Sandor, IQ-9 and Knox enter Trelaina's cave, they encounter laser fire from robots guarding a large gate. They defeat the robots and find Trelaina living in an elevated capsule behind the gate.
41	15	"Third Day at Telezart"	TBA
Trelaina insists on waiting for Mark Venture before talking to the Star Force visitors. When Venture arrives, she shows the visitors that the approaching white comet is a huge war machine that will destroy Telezart in four days and the Earth in 46 days. When the Star Force ask for more details or help, Trelaina refuses to elaborate and tells all of them to leave except Venture. She then explains to Venture how her planet was engaged in a war, but she accidentally used her mind power and caused a huge quake that destroyed more of the planet than the war itself. She is thus afraid to use her power again. Venture tries unsuccessfully to convince her to use it against the Comet Empire, but Trelaina refuses, so Venture leaves. The Star Force are frustrated at her lack of help. Upon receiving the news, the Earth Defense Fleet begins construction of multiple Andromeda-class ships and orders the Star Force to return to Earth.
42	16	"Leaving Telezart"	TBA
Mark Venture returns to Telezart because the Star Force thought Trelaina tried to contact them. Venture pleads with Trelaina to come with them, and she eventually agrees. After returning to the Argo, though, she tells Wildstar that she must return, that she will be safe on Telezart, and that she will use her mind energy to try to bring peace. She then floats back down to the planet's surface. Venture sees her and is very upset but calms after listening to a message she left him. They communicate telepathically promising to see each other again, and Trelaina watches from the surface as the Argo departs.
43	17	"A Show of Force"	TBA
The Comet Empire accelerates its approach to Telezart, and appears that it may even overtake the Argo with its increased speed. Princess Invidia insists that Trelaina is no match for the Comet Empire, but Prince Zordar is more hesitant about confronting her directly. Trelaina contacts Zordar directly and warns him to stop. Zordar argues that the Comet Empire engenders respect from its subjects, while Trelaina insists that he is blinded by greed and arrogance. When the Comet Empire reaches Telezart, Trelaina converts the planet into pure energy and brings heavy damage to the Comet Empire ship, greatly slowing its movement towards the Argo and Earth. Trelaina's fate is uncertain.
44	18	"Desslok's Escape"	TBA
After briefly changing course following damage from the destruction of Telezart, the Comet Empire resumes its course to Earth. Mark Venture pushes the Star Force crew excessively hard for getting to Earth more quickly, in hopes of validating Trelaina's apparent sacrifice. An armada from the Comet Empire advances on the Milky Way, and Captain Gideon gathers the Earth's fleet at Saturn without seeking permission from the Earth Defense Force command. General Stone worries that the Earth is left defenseless if Gideon's plan is unsuccessful. On the Comet Empire flagship, Desslok grabs a guard's gun and takes Princess Invidia prisoner. He and Gamilon General Talan escape from the Comet Empire ship (leaving Invidia behind) and return to the Gamilon fleet. Prince Zordar figures out that Invidia and General Dire lied to him, so he returns Desslok's flagship to him. Desslok orders the Gamilon fleet to pursue the Star Force.
45	19	"Memorial"	TBA
As the Argo passes planet Brumus, Sgt. Knox goes down to say goodbye to his fallen comrades, along with IQ-9. Unbeknownst to them, a Comet Empire ordnance base had been set up there, and it shoots missiles at the Argo. A small Comet Empire fleet of spaceships appears and attacks as well. The laser-fire makes it difficult for Knox's ship to return, but he eventually gets back in the Argo, and they use the wave motion gun to destroy both the enemy fleet and Comet Empire base. The Star Force then warps to meet Captain Gideon and the Earth Defense Force fleet at Saturn to help fight the large Comet Empire advance fleet.
46	20	"The Carrier Fleet Battle"	TBA
Captain Gideon meets with the Earth Defense Force's fleet, saying he has a plan to force the Comet Empire to meet them at Jupiter. Afterward, he meets privately with Wildstar, telling him to attack the Empire's carrier fleet from the rear. Gideon says that the EDF's fleet does not stand a chance unless the carriers are destroyed. In addition, Gideon asks Wildstar to ensure that any retreating ships flee toward Saturn, since that is where the rest of the force will be waiting. Wildstar acknowledges the plan and briefs his crew, stressing the importance of radio – and even radar – silence so they do not give themselves away. Once the Argo is in position, and after it locates the enemy, Wildstar leads the Argo's Black Tigers in an attack on the Empire's carriers. The attack catches the enemy by surprise, and the Star Force manages to destroy the entire carrier fleet. Wildstar then has the Argo head to Saturn to join the other EDF ships against the Comet Empire's main fleet.
47	21	"The Main Fleet Battle"	TBA
The Earth Defense Fleet battles the Comet Empire's advanced fleet, taking heavy damage before Captain Gideon takes the Andromeda and the rest of the fleet into the rings of Saturn. There, the tide turns and the EDF forces the Comet Empire's fleet to retreat. Suddenly, the Comet Empire appears next to the Argo, inflicting heavy damage and causing a fire in the engine room. Sandor and Orion work to contain the fire while Derek Wildstar orders the crew to abandon ship. However, when Wildstar goes to check on Sandor and Orion, he is seriously injured. Meanwhile, the Andromeda's fleet battles the Comet Empire and bombards it with multiple Wave Motion Gun blasts, successfully destroying its destructive plasma shield. The core complex is revealed to have an impervious secondary protective shield over the structure above, an impenetrable hemisphere of planetoid mass below, and at the equator a titanic rotating-belt battery of energy cannons. The Comet Empire then erases the Earth Defense Fleet. With the Andromeda heavily damaged, Captain Gideon radios a final message to the Star Force suggesting that they attack the Empire from below. The Andromeda is then destroyed.
48	22	"Stop-over at Ganymede"	TBA
With the Argo the only ship in the Earth Defense Force remaining, the Star Force returns to the ship and hurries to make repairs. Sandor has the Argo land at the Ganymede base on Jupiter. Wildstar, who is recovering from his injuries, wakes up in a bed in the infirmary. When IQ-9 tells him about what happened to the Andromeda and how the repairs are going, he tries to get up, but Nova has IQ-9 forcibly return the captain to his bed. Dr. Sane also orders him to get some rest. On Earth, news of the Earth Defense Force's defeat at Saturn, as well as the Argo's disappearance, causes mass panic among the population. Zordar demands the Earth's unconditional surrender and, in a show of force, uses his primary battery ring of cannons to reduce the Moon to a molten mass. To avoid being annihilated, the Earth is forced to comply. Upon hearing of the Earth's decision, Wildstar pulls himself out of bed and addresses his crew, rallying them to fight. With all repairs completed, the Argo blasts off for Earth.
49	23	"Desslok's Victory"	TBA
Wildstar orders a warp to take the Argo to the Comet Empire. However, when the Argo reaches the coordinates, the Star Force discovers that the Comet Empire is headed to Earth, while they find themselves quickly surrounded by Gamilons, led by Desslok. Wildstar tries to convince Desslok not to attack, but Desslok sends his entire fleet after the Argo, heavily damaging the Argo's landing dock and surrounding the ship. Wildstar points the Argo at Desslok's ship, intending to use the Wave Motion Gun against it. However, just as the gun reaches full charge, Desslok transports several space mines directly in front of it, preventing the Star Force from using the gun. Wildstar then has the Argo do a small space warp, causing his ship to ram Desslok's. He then leads a boarding party onto Desslok's ship. Meanwhile, Nova is nearly hit by gunfire outside the Argo. Venture rescues Nova but is knocked off the ship and into space, possibly hit and presumably dead. The episode ends with Wildstar, having been injured by falling debris, holding Desslok and his aide at gunpoint.
50	24	"Desslok's Turning"	TBA
Although badly wounded and bleeding, Wildstar confronts Desslok on his ship. Desslok prepares for a duel, but Wildstar collapses from the loss of blood before he can fire. Having followed Wildstar, Nova rushes to his side, confessing her love for him and for the Earth. Realizing that Nova and Wildstar love Earth as much as he loves Gamilon, Desslok lowers his weapon, giving them a piece of advice as he leaves: the Star Force attacked Gamilon at its weakest point, from underneath. He suggests they attack the Comet Empire the same way. Wildstar learns of Venture's fate but is given little time to mourn the loss of his longtime friend when he finds out about the Earth's capitulation and imminent official surrender. Since the Comet Empire is in the water, Wildstar decides to submerge and attack it from below, using the suggestion from both Desslok and Gideon. However, the Argo only has torpedoes, as the attack on Desslok's ship rendered the main guns and the Wave Motion Gun unusable. Meanwhile, in space, Trelaina recovers Venture's body and discovers that although he is unconscious, he remains just barely alive. A surrender party launches from the shoreline to meet the Comet Empire. Wildstar sends a message to the surrender party advising them of the Argo's attack and to clear the area around the Empire.
51	25	"The Final Battle"	TBA
As the Argo launches torpedoes against the Comet Empire, Zordar orders the Empire to be launched. The Argo pursues the Empire, positioning itself out of range of its guns, and maneuvers itself below the Empire. Sandor discovers the Empire's weak spot: an opening in the base from where the Empire's planes are being launched. Wildstar leads an attack team through the opening, but Sandor is hit and unable to walk. Knox, the leader of the Space Marines, says he will finish the mission himself as a way of thanking the Star Force for rescuing them. He attaches bombs to the Empire's energy source, then detonates them, rendering the Empire unable to move. Meanwhile, Zordar escapes with Invidia, Dire and Gorse in a new space fortress.
52	26	"Argo, Make Us Proud!"	March 7, 1981
Zordar's space fortress launches an assault on the Argo, heavily damaging it and injuring several of its crew. As the Star Force watches helplessly, Zordar attacks the Earth. Meanwhile, Trelaina uses her life force to bring Mark Venture back to life. Derek Wildstar orders the crew evacuated from the Argo. He boards the last remaining evacuation ship, but activates its autopilot and jumps off at the last minute. On board the Argo, he prepares it for its final trip – a collision course with Zordar's ship. Suddenly, he sees Nova, who decided to remain to help him. As Wildstar and Nova steer the Argo toward Zordar's ship, they receive a communication from Trelaina, who is holding an unconscious – but alive – Venture. Trelaina returns Venture to the Argo, then says that Wildstar does not need to sacrifice the ship; she will fight Zordar. When Trelaina appears, Zordar stops his attack and tries to retreat, but Trelaina destroys his ship, apparently sacrificing herself in the process. Wildstar and Nova salute Trelaina, and the Argo returns to Earth.

=== Season 3 (1984) ===
Star Blazers Season 3 is an adaptation of the Japanese Space Battleship Yamato III television season. The plot of Season 3 opens at an undisclosed date, but presumably in 2203 or later. It concerns the travails of Earth and its Star Force as they get drawn into a galaxy-wide war between two enormous empires—the Galmans (the reformed Gamilon Empire) and the Bolar Federation.

The plot was altered slightly from original Japanese script to account for flashback footage from the Japanese films, Yamato: The New Voyage. New Voyage and its sequel, Be Forever Yamato, which occur between Seasons 2 and 3, but were not aired in America, nor seen by most American fans. The films deal with the Gamilons and the Earthlings as they combine forces to fight the Dark Nebula Empire. The script of Season 3 was altered in those scenes to state (incorrectly) that the enemy was a remnant of the Comet Empire.

Season 3 was adapted into English several years after the first two seasons, and uses a different voice cast. It also saw a very limited release, airing in syndication in handful of markets. As such, it did not receive a wide release until the early 90s when it was released on VHS as "Starblazers: The Lost Episodes".

List of Star Blazers season 3 episodes
No. overall	No. in season	Title	Original release date
53	1	"Solar System Faces Destruction"	TBA
As a war rages on between two factions outside of Earth's solar system, Cadet Jason Jetter sees his parents off on a sightseeing tour of space. However, a stray missile from the war strikes and destroys the space tour bus and also hits the sun. On Earth, Jason learns that he will be assigned to the rebuilt Argo. He meets Captain Derek Wildstar, who assigns him to KP duty, much to his chagrin. Wildstar learns that he will be in command of the rebuilt Argo and is reunited with former shipmates Sandor and Mark Venture. He is also given an assignment: the activity on the sun has ramped up so much that, left unchecked, it will destroy the Earth in one year and the entire solar system in three. The Star Force is charged with finding a new planet for Earth's inhabitants. Knowing Jason is unhappy with the assignment, Derek goads the cadet into sparring with him to vent his frustrations. He then consoles Jason on the loss of his parents, saying he too lost his family a long time ago. Derek also says he assigned Jason to such a lowly position so the cadet could prove himself to him and the rest of the crew. Jason accepts the assignment and the challenge, and he and Derek become like brothers.
54	2	"Great Battle in the Silver Stream (Milky Way)"	TBA
On board the Argo, Commander Wildstar meets former shipmate Cory Conroy. Derek shows Conroy the new Cosmo Tiger fighter, being piloted by Cadet Flash Contrail. In the mess hall, they meet Flash briefly before Derek receives orders to send Flash back home. Mark Venture briefs the crew on where they plan to look for a new planet, but Derek says that beyond a certain point they do not know what to expect. The ongoing war between the two factions intrudes into Earth's solar system, prompting the Earth Defense Force commander to order the Argo to launch sooner than the six days Wildstar said he needed to prepare for departure. Meanwhile, the increasing solar activity creates more havoc on the Earth. When Flash gets home, he argues with his father, who wants him to take over the family business. Flash's sick mother implores his father to let him return to the Star Force so he can be happy.
55	3	"Star Force Embarks at Dawn"	TBA
During the ongoing war outside of Earth's solar system, one of the ships mistakenly warps to Earth's atmosphere, heading directly for the Argo's location. The Earth Defense Force alerts Commander Wildstar, who sends the Cosmo Tigers to investigate. The ship attacks the Tigers, but they dispatch it. Wildstar briefs his crew on the mission, offering those who wish to remain on Earth a chance to leave. Chief Communications Officer Homer Glitchman is the only one who does so, wanting to find a girl who had given him a flower, but whose name he did not get. Derek discovers that the girl in question is Wendy, the EDF's commander's granddaughter, and sends out the Cosmo Tigers to bring Homer back. Just then, he finds Homer still on board and brings him back to meet Wendy, who wishes him luck. As the Argo launches into space, 329 days remain before the sun destroys Earth.
56	4	"Shoot for Planet Mars"	TBA
Commander Wildstar orders a warp to the planet Mars to test the crew. As soon as the ship comes out of warp, he has the crew go through sixteen hours of drills, including a simulated attack on Mars and the Argo taking damage and casualties. While the exhausted cadets rest, Jason discovers that the section commanders continue to train even after drills are completed. He also learns that Wildstar trains harder than anyone else, even in his spare time. Just then, the crew are summoned to their battle stations when the ship's radar picks up enemy missiles approaching. The Argo destroys all the missiles and continues on its journey. 328 days remain before the sun destroys Earth.
57	5	"S O S Legendra!"	TBA
When the Argo picks up an unidentified spaceship, Commander Wildstar orders all hands to their battle stations. He makes radio contact with the spaceship, which identifies itself as the Legendra, says it is heavily damaged, and requests time to make repairs. After consulting with the Earth Defense Force's commander, Wildstar gives the Legendra 24 hours to make repairs and offers to provide any necessary supplies. He meets with the Legendra's captain, Captain Ram of the planet Berth, who tells him about their war with the Galman Empire. Just then, one fleet of the Galman's Eastern Task Force appears. Sandor recognizes the ships as the same type they fought just before the Argo left Earth. General Dagon, the Galman commander in command of the fleet, demands the Legendra, but Ram negotiates more time with Dagon and completes repairs. However, just as Ram leaves the Argo, Dagon orders an attack on both ships. Wildstar launches a counterattack, plunging the Argo into the middle of the war. 326 days remain before the sun destroys Earth.
58	6	"Great Battle Near Planet Brumus"	TBA
Dagon continues his attack on the Argo and the Legendra near planet Brumus. The Cosmo Tigers destroy several Galman ships, and Dagon ramps up the attack. Ram sends one final message thanking the Argo for its help before the Legendra is destroyed. Commander Wildstar orders the Cosmo Tigers back before continuing the counterattack on the Galman fleet. Dagon orders his flagship and two others to warp while the remaining ships continue to engage the Argo. One ship crashes into the Argo, inflicting heavy damage. A Galman boarding party engages the Argo's KP crew, mortally wounding Jason's supervisor. Jason grabs several weapons and helps hold off the boarding party. Wildstar leads a team to help, and Jason kills his first combatant – a Galman robot. The Argo pulls free from the Galman ship before the latter explodes. On the Argo's main deck, Wildstar offers a space burial to those who died in the attack, including Jason's supervisor and several non-robotic Galmanians. 325 days remain before the sun destroys Earth.
59	7	"The Rough Seas of Alpha Centauri"	TBA
On the Argo's main deck, the bridge crew tosses coins into space as a custom for luck. The Argo then receives a distress call from the planet Alpha. After arguing over whether to land or continue their mission, Derek and Sandor finally convince Mark to take the ship down. Meanwhile, on the Galman's repair base near Neptune, Dagon orders his fleet to find the Argo. As half the crew repairs the Argo, the other half is given shore leave. When Derek sees some of the new crew members getting into a brawl, he asks Mark, who is watching, why he isn't stopping the fighting. Mark says it's better they blow off steam there than on the ship. Just then, Galman missiles attack the planet, and Sandor has Jason and Flash man the Argo's guns until the rest of the crew can return. On the Argo's bridge, Mark apologizes to Derek, saying he was jealous of him having been made skipper, but now appreciates his judgment because he supported Mark's decision on the planet. Derek says he would be nothing without Mark's ability and knowledge, and the two reaffirm their friendship. Meanwhile, Dagon waits to ambush the Argo as it approaches. 310 days remain before the sun destroys Earth.
60	8	"The Last Pioneer"	TBA
As the Argo approaches one of Neptune's moons, which is similar to Earth, an attempt on Earth to use the sun's energy to cool it off fails. Meanwhile, Commander Wildstar heads a landing party to locate the source of several radio transmissions coming from the planet. Just then, the party encounters fire from a lone gunman, and they pursue the man, who appears to be from Earth. They find the man, his daughter, and her husband, the latter of whom is seriously sick and eventually dies. When the man collapses, the team transports him and his daughter back to the Argo. On the other side of the planet, Dagon prepares to attack the Star Force with an array of ships designed to reflect lasers fired from the planet's surface at their target. He activates the weapon, attacking the Argo from all sides. Wildstar heads off to locate the base and destroy it. 308 days remain before the sun destroys Earth..
61	9	"Battle at Barnard's Star"	TBA
As Dagon continues his attack on the Argo, Derek Wildstar tries to locate the Galman base. He discovers that Galman ships, not satellites, are reflecting the lasers toward the Argo, and launches an attack on them. The Cosmo Tigers provide additional support, destroying the ships. Derek locates the relay stations and orders a surprise attack. Dagon launches a proton missile at the Argo, but the Star Force fires the Wave Motion Gun, destroying both the missile and the base. Dr. Sane tries his best to save the old man rescued from the planet, but is unsuccessful. Derek then learns that the woman he rescued from the planet is four months pregnant and decides to send all the women on the ship, except for Nova, back to Earth. 306 days remain before the sun destroys Earth.
62	10	"Dagon's New Fleet Counter-attacks"	TBA
Commander Wildstar answers a distress call from Captain Hammer, a stranded meteorologist, who says he spotted a large fleet of Galman vessels and requests an escort to a nearby space station. Derek consults with his staff and offers to escort Hammer halfway, but having heard of the Star Force's mission, Hammer refuses the escort, saying the mission is far more important. As Dagon's fleet attacks the space station, Hammer sends a warning message to the Argo advising it to leave the area immediately. Hammer leaves the station in a ship which is attacked, causing him to crash on a nearby planet. Derek sends Flash to investigate. Flash finds Hammer, who again warns him of the danger, then dies. Dagon's fleet attacks the Argo, and a direct hit to the ship's port engine causes the Argo to drift toward the planet Cygnus and a space current. There, it encounters several space tornadoes, any of which could destroy it. 285 days remain before the sun destroys Earth.
63	11	"Star Force Faces Danger at Cygnus"	TBA
Near the planet Cygnus, the Argo is caught in a space current containing several space tornadoes, and its port engine is malfunctioning. Engineer Orion suggests that IQ-9 help with diagnosing the problem. The engineers repair the engine, but too late for the ship to avoid going through the tornadoes. As soon as the Argo emerges from the space current, Galman forces drop out of warp, surrounding the ship. Commander Wildstar orders a counterattack, but the main guns are jammed, while Galman ships disable the fighter launch deck. Derek orders that the main guns be operated manually. To buy some time to complete repairs, Mark takes the Argo behind an asteroid. Dagon contacts the Star Force, demanding unconditional surrender. The Argo responds by firing on the Galman ships, destroying most of them. Dagon has his flagship and one other do a space warp, and the Argo warps in pursuit. Upon leaving warp, the Galman ships catch the Argo in tractor beams and pull it toward a black hole. To escape, the Argo fires the Wave Motion Gun, causing both Galman ships to be pulled into the black hole and destroyed. 283 days remain before the sun destroys Earth.
64	12	"Stellar Prison Camp"	TBA
As the Argo approaches a planet, two ships drop out of warp and begin attacking it. Commander Wildstar radios one of the ships, identifying his vessel. The ships immediately cease their attack, saying they are from Berth and had heard of the Argo's helping the Legendra. Derek asks for permission to land to make repairs and collect food. While gathering supplies, Nova and Jason see what appears to be a penal colony but are unable to investigate further. The Star Force attends a reception given by Brozof, Berth's governor general. Brozof says Berth is part of the Bolar Federation, which wants to extend an offer of protection to the Earth, although many of the crew are suspicious of Brozof's words. Meanwhile, Jason and Flash go back to look at the prison camp. Suddenly, a group of prisoners breaks out of the prison camp and boards the Argo. The prisoners demand the Argo blast off or they will kill the engine crew. 228 days remain before the sun destroys Earth.
65	13	"Dreadful Bolar Federation"	TBA
As the hijackers take over the Argo's engine room, Jason and Flash discover they are carrying stun rifles and report this to Commander Wildstar. The hijackers demand to be taken to the planet Guardiana and its Queen, who is said to be a legendary space goddess. Leading a team into the engine room, Derek overpowers the hijackers, turning them over to the Bolars. Bemlayze, the Bolar Prime Minister, arranges for Derek to meet him on Berth. En route, Derek discovers the hijackers are being executed. He then learns that Bemlayze had ordered their execution. When Derek says he will rescue the prisoners, the meeting turns sour, forcing Derek and his crew to fight their way out of the meeting and off the planet. In space, Bemlayze's ships attack the Argo but miss and end up destroying Berth. Derek vows to never forget Bemlayze's cruelty. 227 days remain before the sun destroys Earth.
66	14	"Subspace Submarine Captain: Galman Wolf"	TBA
Commander Wildstar makes a report to Earth, saying the Argo has investigated several planets, but all are uninhabitable. Meanwhile, Galman Eastern Task Force commander Admiral Smeardom summons Commander Lugna von Feral, who is in charge of the "Wolf Pack", a fleet of space submarines. Smeardom tells Feral what happened to Dagon and charges him with destroying the Argo. Feral locates the Argo and launches an attack with space torpedoes, but the Argo is unable to locate the Galman ships. From an observation window, Jason sees a periscope. He reports this to Derek, saying he thinks the rest of the ship could be hiding in subspace. Impressed with the cadet's knowledge, Derek reassigns him to the bridge. The Argo warps at the same time the Galman ships enter normal space. Feral orders his ships to again submerge into subspace. Sandor works on a subspace sonar to help locate the Galmans while the Argo damages some of the Galman ships. Feral then launches another attack that injures Derek. 207 days remain before the sun destroys Earth.
67	15	"Star Force becomes a Prisoner"	TBA
On board the Argo, Dr. Sane operates on Commander Wildstar to remove shrapnel from his arm. When Derek wakes up, he tries to go to the bridge, but Nova orders him to rest, saying she will take care of him. Meanwhile, Sandor finishes the subspace sonar and installs it on the ship. In space, Feral has two of his ships move into position so they can be detected. The Argo destroys both ships, but the rest of the fleet then lures it to Admiral Smeardom's fortress. With Derek incapacitated, Jason orders an attack, but Smeardom captures the Argo. Upset at the result, Jason visits Derek in the infirmary to apologize. However, Derek consoles the cadet, telling him not to be discouraged. He then asks Jason to help him to the bridge. Smeardom reports the ship's capture to Galman Emperor Desslok, but when Desslok hears the ship's name for the first time, he berates Smeardom for disobeying orders. Desslok radios the Argo and apologizes for Smeardom's actions. He invites the Star Force to visit him at the center of the Galman Empire, not as a prisoner, but as a guest. 207 days remain before the sun destroys Earth.
68	16	"Festive Day for Desslok"	TBA
Released from Smeardom's ship, the Argo warps directly into the center of the Galman Empire. The arrival brings back memories for Commander Wildstar, who recalls the Argo's first journey to Iscandar to help save Earth. En route, the Star Force battled and defeated Desslok. However, when the Comet Empire attacked, Desslok sided with the Argo. Heavily damaged from the earlier war, Gamilon exploded. Queen Starsha of Iscandar also sacrificed her planet to save both Desslok and the Star Force. When the Star Force meets Desslok, they notice twin planets, one looking like Gamilon and the other like Iscandar. Desslok says he named the Iscandar-like planet after Starsha in memory of her sacrifice and also because he loved her. Desslok had also built the Galman Empire by liberating Galman, the ancestral planet of Gamilon, and several other planets from the Bolar Federation. He then built up a powerful armed force and amassed great wealth to ensure the planets would remain liberated. The news leaves Derek puzzled and worrying about whether Desslok plans to conquer Earth. If so, it means the end of their friendship. 183 days remain before the sun destroys Earth.
69	17	"Desslok's Empire in the Moment of Crisis"	TBA
Desslok visits the Argo, where he pays his respects to the late Captain Avatar, who had commanded the ship on her first voyage. Commander Wildstar explains what happened to Earth's sun and the Argo's mission. Desslok offers his help to help make amends for the Galmans' part of the tragedy. Desslok's scientists offer a plan, which the Earth Defense Force agrees to use. Desslok then says that he built his weapons to maintain peace, and his ultimate goal is to unify all the planets to ensure peace. Just then the Bolar Federation attacks. Galman activates its defenses, and all but one missile is destroyed. The Argo launches to destroy the last missile. Unable to fire the Wave Gun himself as his arm is still healing, Derek has Jason fire the weapon. Jason does so, destroying the missile, and Derek cautions Desslok about the danger of relying so heavily on weaponry. 182 days remain before the sun destroys Earth.
70	18	"The Angry Sun"	TBA
Sandor and Homer travel to Earth with Major Cranshaw, one of Desslok's scientists. After meeting the Earth Defense Force's commander, Cranshaw takes one ship to Saturn while Sandor and Homer follow in a second ship. Sandor explains the plan: first, Cranshaw will launch specially designed missiles to form a magnetic shield around the sun. Then Sandor's group will launch special missiles to gather asteroid fragments and send them into the sun. Finally, Cranshaw will launch proton missiles, and the resulting reaction will return the sun to normal. At first, the plan appears to succeed, with the sun's temperature falling, but it then rapidly rises, forcing both ships to immediately retreat. Humiliated by the failure, Cranshaw orders his men to abandon his ship, then commits suicide by flying it into the sun. Derek and Nova offer their condolences to Desslok on the loss of Major Cranshaw. Desslok wishes Derek and Nova success on their mission. As Derek and Nova leave, they see several of Queen Guardiana's worshippers. Derek asks Desslok about the worshippers, and Desslok simply says Galman does not need two gods. He then tells the Star Force about another planet – Phantom – which is similar to Earth and supposedly uninhabited. 153 days remain before the sun destroys Earth.
71	19	"On the Way to Planet Phantom"	TBA
The Argo begins the first of three warps to planet Phantom, a distant planet of which little is known other than that it resembles Earth. At Bolar Headquarters, Belmayze orders a fleet to attack and destroy the Argo. Meanwhile, the Star Force receives a distress call from a small planet. Commander Wildstar sends Jason, Flash and IQ-9 to investigate, but just as they leave the Argo, the transmission stops. Derek decides to allow the mission to continue. On the planet, Jason and Flash discover several followers of Queen Guardiana who were on a pilgrimage when their ship became disabled and they had to land. Derek has a team repair the pilgrims' ship, but Bolar ships appear just after the pilgrims take off. Derek tries to negotiate with the Bolar fleet, but the fleet attacks both the Argo and the pilgrims' ship. Derek has the Cosmo Tigers launch to protect the pilgrims' ship. Just then, Queen Guardiana appears before the Argo in the direction of Phantom. The Star Force wonders if she might perhaps be guiding them toward the planet. 139 days remain before the sun destroys Earth.
72	20	"Planet Phantom"	TBA
Approaching planet Phantom, the Star Force notices that it looks just like Earth. The ship erupts into near-chaos as the crew celebrates. Initial surveys indicate the planet is almost exactly like Earth in every way. Commander Wildstar relays the discovery of Phantom to Earth and Desslok, intending to send a landing party to investigate further. Suddenly, IQ-9 tells Derek that there is danger on Phantom, but can not pinpoint exactly what it is. Without any details, Derek orders the landing party to proceed. Meanwhile, Desslok contacts Belmayze and warns him to leave the Argo alone, but Belmayze refuses. On Phantom's surface, the Argo's crew suddenly see people that either died or they had left behind. Jason, Flash and Nova see their parents, Derek sees Captain Avatar, and Sandor sees Derek's brother Alex and Queen Starsha of Iscandar. Just then the entire crew sees Avatar's memorial, and they wonder if what they are seeing are real or merely illusions. 118 days remain before the sun destroys Earth.
73	21	"Lost Hope"	TBA
On planet Phantom, the Argo's crew see Avatar's monument and run to it, only to have it disappear in front of their eyes. Derek reports his findings to Desslok, who is just as puzzled and sends a survey team to the planet. Meanwhile, a Bolar Federation ship warps to Phantom with intent to engage and destroy the Argo. Derek and Sandor have IQ-9 reanalyze the planet. Meanwhile, Desslok's survey ship reports that Phantom looks like Galmania. Derek meets with the Galman ship's crew and discovers that the planet appears to each person differently, depending on their experiences. IQ-9 and Sandor conclude that the planet is a living entity and could be creating the illusions to protect itself. When Desslok hears about the planet, he orders his men to destroy it as soon as the Argo is clear. On the planet, Jason and Flash are trapped in what appears to be a tunnel. 113 days remain before the sun destroys Earth.
74	22	"Farewell Planet Phantom"	TBA
On board the Argo, Derek, Nova and Sandor are unable to locate Flash and Jason, who are trapped in a tunnel on the planet. Suddenly, Flash and Jason meet the planet's life center, who asks them to take care of Queen Mariposa. Phantom says that Mariposa has the secret to the planet Guardiana and must be taken somewhere safe. Phantom then returns Flash, Jason and Mariposa to the planet's surface, where a rescue ship from the Argo picks them up. They describe their findings to Derek, who assigns Flash to be Mariposa's escort. After the Star Force leaves, they see Galmanian ships materialize. Mariposa says that the Galmans will attack Phantom. Flash warns Derek, who sends an urgent message to the Galmans asking them not to attack. However, the message is ignored and the Galmans destroy Phantom. Derek asks Desslok why he ordered Phantom destroyed. Desslok says that he punished Phantom for embarrassing him and Derek by deceiving them. Having lost much time, the Star Force resumes its search for a new Earth. Meanwhile, Belmayze and Desslok learn that Mariposa is now on board the Argo and dispatch war fleets after the ship. 111 days remain before the sun destroys Earth.
75	23	"Battle at the Scalageck Star Cluster"	TBA
The Star Force approaches Beta in the Scalageck Star Cluster, the last possible planet the Argo is scheduled to survey. Although the planet is uninhabitable, the crew discovers the remains of the United States spaceship Arizona, which was apparently attacked by the Bolar Federation. Just then, both a Galman and a Bolar fleet materialize and both demand Queen Mariposa. Derek refuses, ordering Flash to look after Mariposa. Meanwhile, Desslok orders the Galmans to defend the Argo. The Bolar fleet attacks the Argo, which – along with the Galmans – returns fire. Several ships are destroyed, along with that of the Galmans' fleet commander, Admiral Gustaf. The Bolar main fleet radios the Argo, again demanding Mariposa. Derek refuses, and the Bolars attack. Using asteroids for cover, the Argo launches a counterattack with its wave cartridges, finally ending the battle. Flash begs Queen Guardiana for help, prompting Mariposa to help by inviting the Argo to Guardiana. Even though the Star Force did not find a second Earth, Derek decides on one final mission – to take Mariposa to Guardiana. 51 days remain before the sun destroys Earth.
76	24	"The Secret of Planet Guardiana"	TBA
The Star Force approaches a planet, which Mariposa says is the gateway to a different dimension. As Mariposa opens the gateway, Desslok's fleet materializes behind the Argo. As the ship approaches Guardiana, the sensors indicate that it is just like Earth. Jason suggests that they take Guardiana for a second Earth, but Derek says that if they did, they would be no better than the Galmans or the Bolars. Meanwhile, both Galman and Bolar ships follow the Argo. Derek orders the Star Force to defend Guardiana. While Desslok destroys the Bolar fleet in space, the Argo's crew defeats the troops on Guardiana. Derek learns that Guardiana had a powerful array of weapons, but swore them off long ago, only wishing for peace. He tells Desslok, who decides not to conquer Guardiana. Meanwhile, Mariposa offers an extremely powerful cannon that she says can restore the sun. She bids the Star Force goodbye, then becomes the new Queen Guardiana. The Star Force returns to Earth with a renewed hope. 46 days remain before the sun destroys Earth.
77	25	"Star Force, Shoot that Sun!"	December 4, 1984
Earth is one month from the end when the Argo arrives with the cannon from Guardiana. Just as the Star Force is about to fire the cannon into the sun, the Bolar Federation launches a surprise attack which damages the cannon. As Desslok joins the fight, Jason runs out to repair the cannon and is hit. Flash avenges him by crashing his fighter into the Bolar fortress, heavily damaging it. To ensure that Flash's sacrifice is not in vain, Desslok fires his cannon, destroying the fortress. Although critically wounded, Jason manages to repair the gun so Derek and Nova can fire it. Their attempt succeeds, and the sun – and Earth – are saved. Jason thanks Derek and Nova, wishing them happiness. He then dies from his injuries. As the bridge crew holds a memorial for Jason, Queen Guardiana appears carrying Flash's body and declares that war leaves no winners. She also says the Star Force should never fight to obtain peace, for it could be worse than fighting an enemy. Desslok congratulates Wildstar, wishing him luck in rebuilding. As they again part ways, the series ends.
