= List of Space Battleship Yamato III episodes =

This article is a list of episodes from the television show Space Battleship Yamato III in order by production number.

== Episodes ==
No.	Title	Original release date
1	"The Solar System is Destroyed"; Transliteration: "Tayōkei no Hametsu" (Japanese: 太陽系の破滅)	11 October 1980
2	"Great Battle on the Milky Way"; Transliteration: "Gingakei Taisen" (Japanese: 銀河系大戦)	18 October 1980
3	"Star Forces Embarks at Dawn"; Transliteration: "Yamato Akatsuki no Hasshin" (Japanese: ヤマト暁の発進)	25 October 1980
4	"Shoot for Planet Mars"; Transliteration: "Ano Kasei o Ute" (Japanese: あの火星を撃て)	1 November 1980
5	"S.O.S Legendra!"; Transliteration: "SOS! Rejendora-gō" (Japanese: SOS! ラジェンドラ号)	8 November 1980
6	"Great Battle Near Planet Brumas"; Transliteration: "Gekitō! 11-Ban Wakusei Kūiki" (Japanese: 激闘! 11番惑星空域)	15 November 1980
7	"The Rough Seas of Alpha Centauri"; Transliteration: "Arufa Hoshi Nami Takashi" (Japanese: アルファ星波高し)	22 November 1980
8	"The Last Pioneer"; Transliteration: "Saigo no Kaitaku-sha" (Japanese: 最後の開拓者)	29 November 1980
9	"Battle at Barnard Star"; Transliteration: "Bānādo-boshi no Kettō" (Japanese: バーナード星の決闘)	6 December 1980
10	"Dagon's New Fleet Counter-Attacks"; Transliteration: "Dagon Shin'ei Kantai no Hangeki" (Japanese: ダゴン新鋭艦隊の反撃)	13 December 1980
11	"Yamato Faces Danger at Cygnus"; Transliteration: "Yamato Wēi Shi! Ma no Hakuchō Za Hoshi Iki" (Japanese: ヤマト危し! 魔の白鳥座星域)	20 December 1980
12	"Stellar Prison Camp"; Transliteration: "Uchū no Ryūkeichi" (Japanese: 宇宙の流刑地)	27 December 1980
13	"Dreadful Bolar Federation"; Transliteration: "Osorubeshi! Borā Renpō" (Japanese: 恐るべし! ボラー連邦)	10 January 1981
14	"Subspace Submarine Captain Galman Wolf"; Transliteration: "Jigensen Kōtei Garuman Urufu" (Japanese: 次元潜航艇ガルマンウルフ)	17 January 1981
15	"Yamato's Captured!!"; Transliteration: "Yamato to Waru!!" (Japanese: ヤマト捕わる!!)	24 January 1981
16	"Festive Day for Desslok"; Transliteration: "Desurā no Shukujitsu" (Japanese: デスラーの祝日)	31 January 1981
17	"Desslok's Empire in a Crisis"; Transliteration: "Desurā Teikoku Kiki Ippatsu" (Japanese: デスラー帝国危機一髪)	7 February 1981
18	"The Angry Sun"; Transliteration: "Okoru Taiyō" (Japanese: 怒る太陽)	14 February 1981
19	"On the Way to Planet Phantom"; Transliteration: "Wakusei Fantamu e no Michi" (Japanese: 惑星ファンタムへの道)	21 February 1981
20	"The Planet of Illusions"; Transliteration: "Maboroshi no Wakusei" (Japanese: 幻の惑星)	28 February 1981
21	"Lost Hope"; Transliteration: "Uchikudaka Reta Kibō" (Japanese: 打ち砕かれた希望)	7 March 1981
22	"Farewell Planet Phantom"; Transliteration: "Saraba Yume no Hoshiyo" (Japanese: さらば 夢の星よ)	14 March 1981
23	"Battle at the Scalageck Star Cluster"; Transliteration: "Gekisen! Surakagekku Kaikyō Seidan" (Japanese: 激戦! スカラゲック海峡星団)	21 March 1981
24	"Secret of Planet Guardiana"; Transliteration: "Sharubāto-boshi no Himitsu" (Japanese: シャルバート星の秘密)	28 March 1981
25	"Yamato, Shoot That Sun!"; Transliteration: "Yamato Ano Taiyō o Ute!" (Japanese: ヤマト あの太陽を撃て!)	4 April 1981
